= Neponsit, Queens =

Neighborhood in New York City

Neponsit
- Neighborhood of Queens
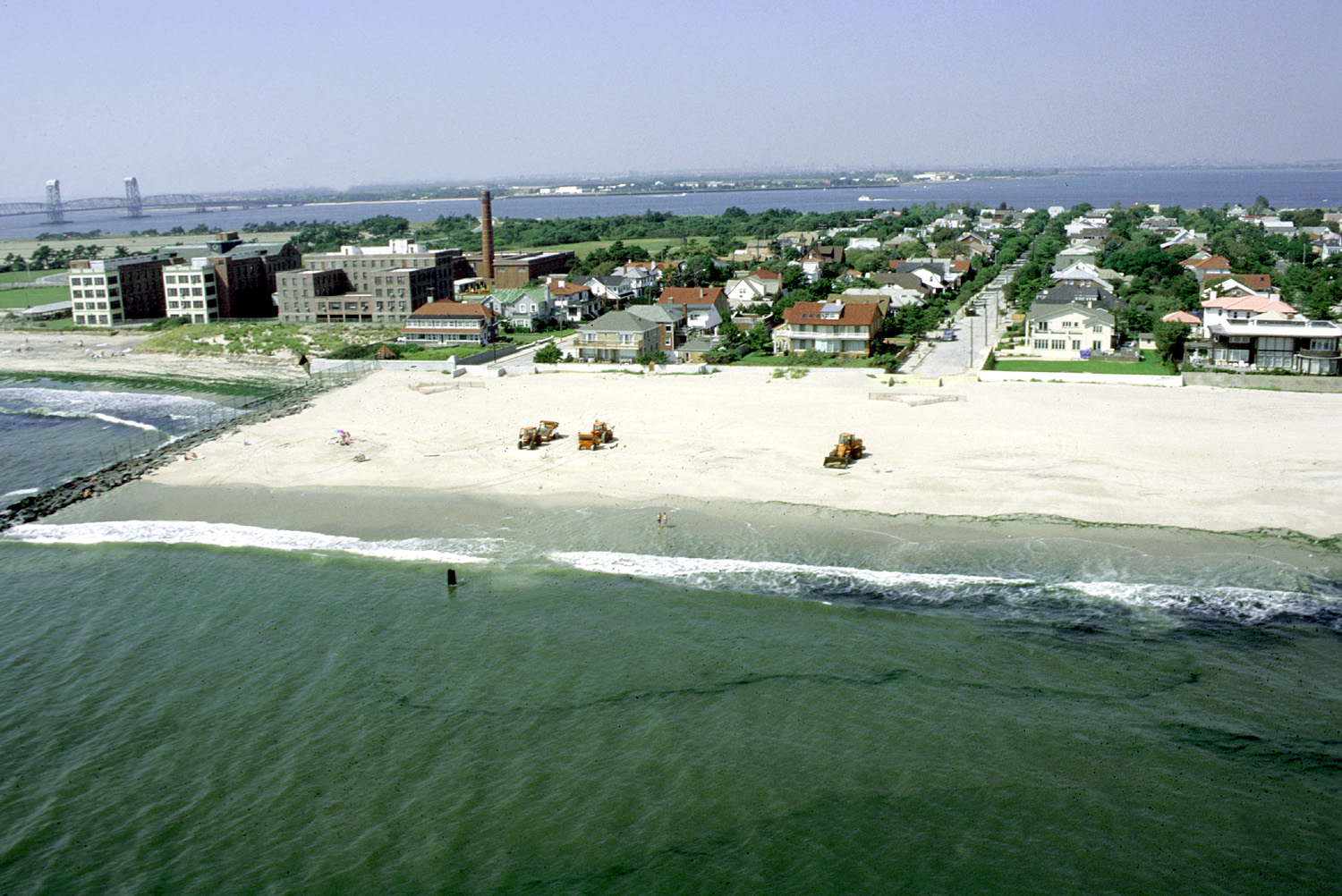
- Aerial view of Neponsit near Jacob Riis Park
- Location within New York City
- Coordinates: 40.572°N 73.86°W
- Country: United States
- State: New York
- City: New York City
- County/Borough: Queens
- Community District: Queens 14
- Named for: "the place between waters"

Population
  - Estimate (2007): 2,000
- Time zone: UTC−5 (EST)
  - Summer (DST): UTC−4 (EDT)
- ZIP Code: 11694
- Area codes: 718, 347, 929, and 917

Neponsit is a small affluent neighborhood located on the western half of the Rockaway Peninsula, the southernmost area of the New York City borough of Queens. The area starts at Beach 142nd Street and ends at Beach 149th Street. It borders the neighborhood of Belle Harbor to the east and Jacob Riis Park on the west. Jamaica Bay and the Atlantic Ocean are the northern and southern borders. The neighborhood is part of Queens Community Board 14. As of January 1, 2007, the neighborhood's population reached just over 2,000, making it one of the smallest communities on the peninsula and in the entire borough of Queens.

== History ==
Neponsit is a Native American name meaning "the place between waters", the waters of the Atlantic Ocean and of Jamaica Bay or Rockaway Inlet.

The present community's character has persisted since it was established. In January 1910, the Neponsit Realty Company purchased the land for the development of an exclusive community. It forbade the construction of any homes that were inexpensive, and the homes were built in order to withstand the beach weather and geography of the narrow peninsula. The entrance to the area was originally marked by a massive ornamental gateway. More recently, a stretch of tree-dotted islands, called "the malls", situated along Rockaway Beach Boulevard, was a distinguishing feature. It extended through Belle Harbor. By the 1930s, high quality homes were dominant in Neponsit.

The first transatlantic flight departed from Neponsit on May 8, 1919, when four United States Navy-Curtis model seaplanes took off from what is now Beach Channel Drive in Neponsit to Newfoundland, Canada, the Azores Islands, and Lisbon in Portugal. On May 31, 1919, a single plane piloted by Lt. Commander Albert C. Read arrived in Plymouth, England.

== Land use and zoning ==
Neponsit is zoned for residential, one-or-two-story single-family homes. Due to this, and its secluded beach location, some homes are mansion-like, and the average market price for properties has approached $1 million, according to Zillow.

== Transportation ==
Public access is available to/from Neponsit via Rockaway Beach Boulevard. The Q35 provides local service to Scholars’ Academy and to Brooklyn College via the Marine Parkway Bridge. The QM16 also provides express service in the area to/from Manhattan during peak hours.

== In popular culture ==
The television show, Rescue Me (FX Network) has regularly filmed in Neponsit using residences to portray the fictional homes of some of the characters, although the article points out that the "story never tells you how a firefighter can afford ... [a] Neponsit home".

== Notable people ==
Notable current and former residents of Neponsit include:

- Frederic E. Hammer (1909–1980), lawyer and politician who served in the New York State Senate
- Jason Miller (1939–2001), playwright and actor, who won the 1973 Pulitzer Prize for Drama and Tony Award for Best Play for his play That Championship Season
- James H. Scheuer (1920–2005), politician who represented New York in the United States House of Representatives from 1975 to 1993

== See also ==
- List of Queens neighborhoods
- Naval Air Station Rockaway
