= Jacob Riis Park =

Public park in Queens, New York

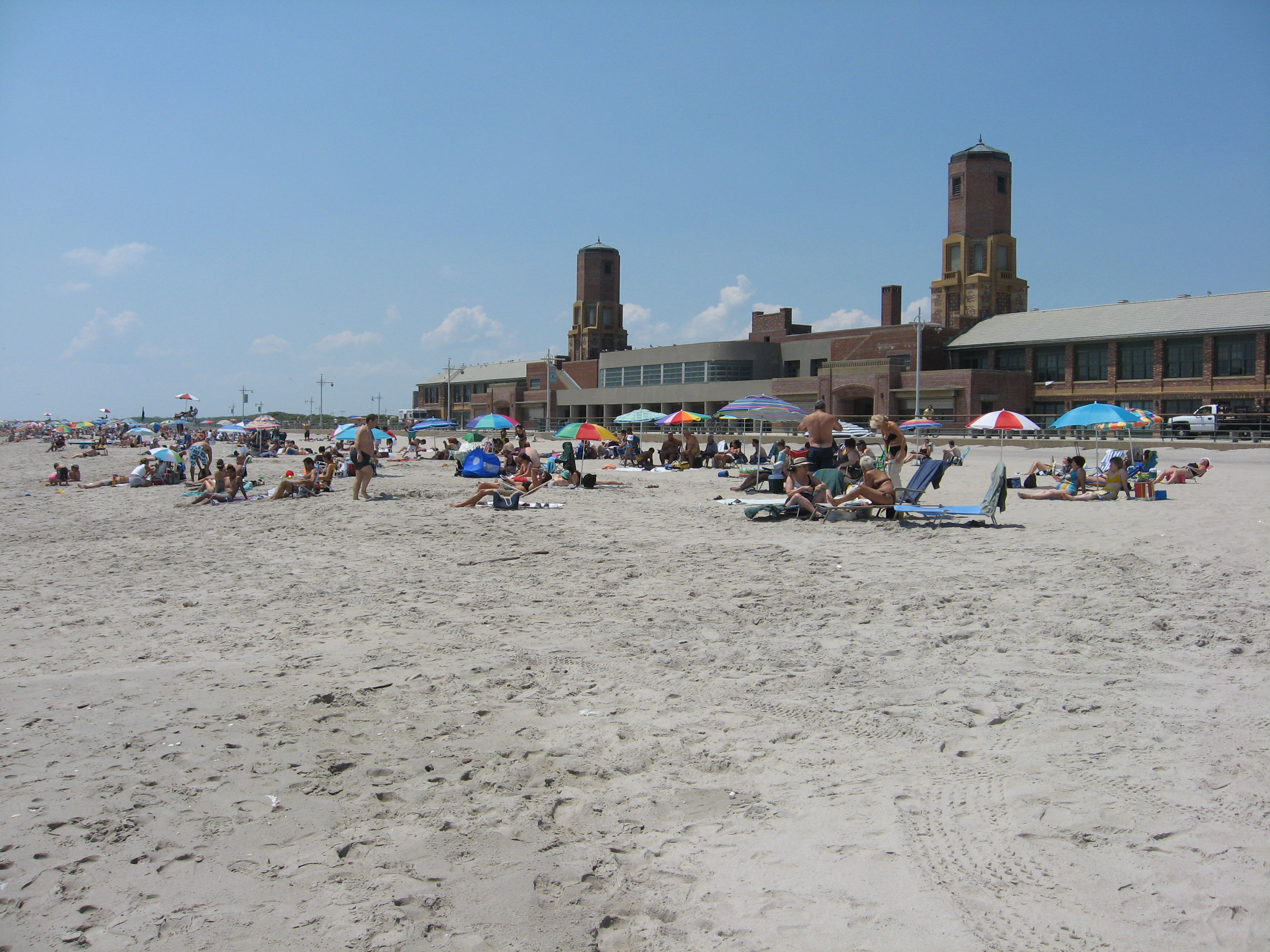
- Interactive map of Jacob Riis Park
- Type: Public park
- Location: Queens, New York City, New York, United States
- Coordinates: 40°34′3″N 73°52′24″W
- Area: 262 acres (106 ha)
- Created: 1937
- Operator: National Park Service
- Status: Open all year
- Public transit: MTA Bus: Q35, QM16
- Jacob Riis Park Historic District
- U.S. National Register of Historic Places
- U.S. Historic district
- Location: New York, New York
- Coordinates: 40°34′3″N 73°52′24″W
- Built: 1932
- Architects: John L. Plock, Gilmore D. Clarke, Aymar Embury II, Clinton Loyd, Julius Burgevin
- Architectural style: Art Deco, Moorish
- NRHP reference No.: 81000081
- Added to NRHP: June 17, 1981

Jacob Riis Park, also called Jacob A. Riis Park and Riis Park, is a seaside park on the southwestern portion of the Rockaway Peninsula in the New York City borough of Queens. It lies at the foot of the Marine Parkway–Gil Hodges Memorial Bridge, east of Fort Tilden, and west of Neponsit and Rockaway Beach. Originally run by the New York City Department of Parks and Recreation, it later became part of the Jamaica Bay Unit of the Gateway National Recreation Area, and is managed by the National Park Service (NPS). It features an extensive sand beach along the Atlantic Ocean coastline and several historic Art Deco structures.

In 1912, the city, urged on by social journalist Jacob Riis, acquired the land for a park initially called Seaside Park and later Telawana Park. In 1914, the park was renamed for Riis. During World War I, the site was used as the Rockaway Naval Air Station, one of the first naval air stations in the United States and, in 1919, the launching point for the first transatlantic flight. The Art Deco-style bathhouse was built in 1932, but much of the park's infrastructure and approaches were built between 1936 and 1937 by New York City Parks Commissioner Robert Moses, who envisioned it as a getaway for New York City residents, like Jones Beach State Park further east on Long Island. The park was built along with the Marine Parkway Bridge and the Belt Parkway in nearby Brooklyn, which provided access to the park.

After a period of decline, Jacob Riis Park was transferred in 1974 to the control of the National Park Service. The Jacob Riis Park Historic District was listed on the National Register of Historic Places in 1981. The Neponsit Beach Hospital, which occupied part of the park's site, was razed in 2023. In addition to the bathhouse, the park contains a north–south central mall; a boardwalk to the north of the beach; a large parking lot; an 18-hole golf course; and several sporting fields. The beaches at Jacob Riis Park, on the south side of the Rockaway peninsula, consists of 15 bays on the Atlantic coast.

== Name ==
The park was originally known as Seaside Park. It was later renamed Telawana Park after Culluloo Telewana, who was believed to be the last surviving member of the Rockaway Lenape tribe until his death in 1818. A monument to Telawana stands in Woodsburgh, Long Island, east of Far Rockaway. In 1914, the park was renamed for Jacob Riis, a famous New York City muckraker journalist and photographer who documented the plight of the poor and working class.

== History ==
=== Early years ===
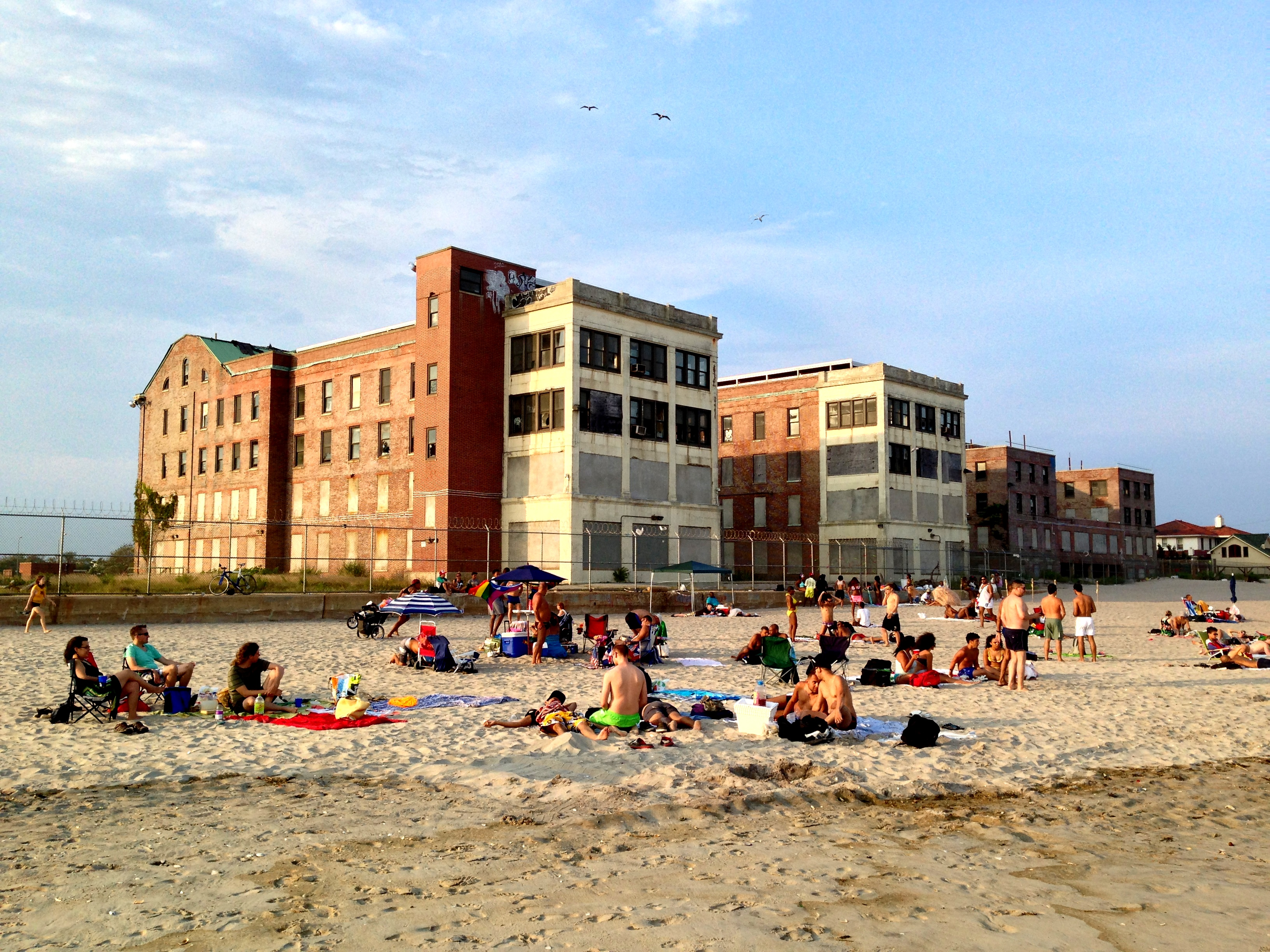
Neponsit Beach Hospital (pictured) was opened in 1915 on Riis Park land, before major park development.

What is now the site of Jacob Riis Park on the western Rockaway Peninsula was under water as recently as the early 19th century. The peninsula was gradually expanded westward by the natural accretion of sand from tidal action. By 1878, the peninsula extended as far as the current western boundaries of the park. The peninsula reached its current extents by the turn of the 20th century. During the War of 1812, the United States Army erected a blockhouse west of the future park site, on what was then an island. It was demolished in 1818.

In 1880, the New York, Woodhaven & Rockaway Railroad opened a railroad line between mainland Queens and the Rockaways, with a terminal in Rockaway Park. In 1879 with the railroad under construction, several New York businessmen formed the Rockaway Beach Improvement Company and drafted plans to create a landscaped park and amusement area in the western Rockaways. This development would include hotels and a horse racing track. At the approximate location of modern Riis Park would be a pavilion for beach-goers. The company purchased 750 acres (300 ha) of land between what are now Rockaway Park and Breezy Point, and later purchased 750 additional acres farther east. Frederick Law Olmsted, the designer of Central Park, was contracted to survey the site. Part of one hotel, called the Rockaway Beach Hotel or the "Hotel Imperial", was opened in August 1881, with other hotels following it, but the park plans never materialized as the park company had gone bankrupt. This incomplete hotel was demolished by 1889. A streetcar line running across the peninsula, operated by the Ocean Electric Railway, opened in 1897, with its western end past Beach 149th Street within the modern park site.

=== Acquisition of park property ===
In 1900, the property that would later become Riis Park was acquired by Edward P. Hatch as part of two lots totaling 1,000 acres (404.685642240 ha) in size. The first plot, the "Hatch Tract," was 350 acres (142 ha) while the second "Bell Harbor tract" was 650 acres (263 ha). The land consisted predominantly of marshland and meadows yet to be developed. From 1902 to 1903, the City of New York initially attempted to create a seaside beach park in Staten Island. In 1904, the city planned to build an oceanside park in the western Rockaways near Rockaway Point (Breezy Point), supported by Jacob Riis' Association for Improving the Condition of the Poor. The Association, as well as New York City Mayor George B. McClellan Jr. and Bellevue and Allied Hospitals president John W. Brannon, also lobbied for a hospital and "convalescent home" to be established. In March 1906, Hatch expressed interest in selling the "Hatch tract", with an asking price of $1 million. On May 15, 1906, an act was passed in the New York State Legislature allowing for the purchase of beach property in or outside of the city for a maximum of $2.5 million. The act also allowed a portion of the property to be leased for the creation of hospitals. The Hatch tract was favored over other potential locations such as Coney Island and Staten Island, due to its large beach area continuously extended by tidal action, and beaches and surf of higher quality than the other sites. Because Hatch was offering the property at a much higher price than its appraised value of $200,000, the city sought to acquire the site via condemnation. Efforts to develop the park, then called Seaside Park, and the hospital were suspended on November 1, 1907, due to the panic of 1907, but resurrected in 1909 after campaigning from citizens and philanthropic groups.

Following the death of Hatch in 1908, the Hatch tract was acquired first by the West Rockaway Land Company. It was then sold to the Neponsit Realty Company, which was developing the Neponsit neighborhood. Now valued between $850,000 and $1.05 million, the Neponsit Company offered to sell the site for $1.5 million. Meanwhile, the New York Parks and Playgrounds Association campaigned for the city to purchase land for a 250 acres (101 ha) park in western Rockaway. The Parks Association created a Seaside Park Committee, with the social reformer Jacob Riis as its chairman. The tract was acquired by the city on March 21, 1912 via condemnation, with the city paying around $1.3 million for the site. Around this time, the park was renamed Telawana Park. On March 25, 1913, the tract was transferred to the New York City Parks Department. The site for the hospital at the east end of the beach was transferred from the Parks Department on April 24, 1913.

After Riis died in May 1914, former United States President Theodore Roosevelt advocated for the renaming of the park to Jacob Riis Park. The name change was approved on January 4, 1915. Neponsit Beach Hospital for Children opened on April 16, 1915. Beginning in late 1915, jetties were installed along the beach in order to prevent beach erosion, and to capture sand from tidal action in order to extend the beach. The jetties were based on similar structures used in nearby Neponsit. By 1917, 10 acres (4.0 ha) of land were added to the beach.

The original plan for the park was created by Parks Department landscape architect Carl F. Pilat in 1913. Pilat was the nephew of Ignatz Anton Pilát, and had also designed Astoria Park around the same time. Pilat's design would have deviated significantly from the current layout. Much of the property north of Rockaway Beach Boulevard (then called Washington Avenue) would have been developed into recreational space with fields and courts for sports. Pilat's layout of the park utilized Beaux-Arts planning, characterized by pedestrian pathways organized in an axial arrangement, with focal points at the southern beach "esplanade", and at a bandstand at the north end of the park. The Jamaica Bay coastline at the north end of the site would have been utilized for an additional beach and boardwalk, along with a marine basin for boats, and a lagoon. In addition to the space on the Atlantic Ocean coast used by Neponsit Hospital, an additional tract on the west end of the beach would be utilized for a second health facility; only one-third of the beach would have been part of the park. The Parks Department had held a contest in 1913 accepting submission of designs for the park. Pilat's plan incorporated elements of the six finalists in the competition. At the time, the Pilat plan was considered too expensive and was not implemented. Because of this and the onset of World War I, Riis Park remained largely undeveloped into the 1930s. Similar Beaux-Arts planning would later be incorporated into the fairgrounds of Flushing Meadows during the 1939 New York World's Fair.

=== Use as a military base ===
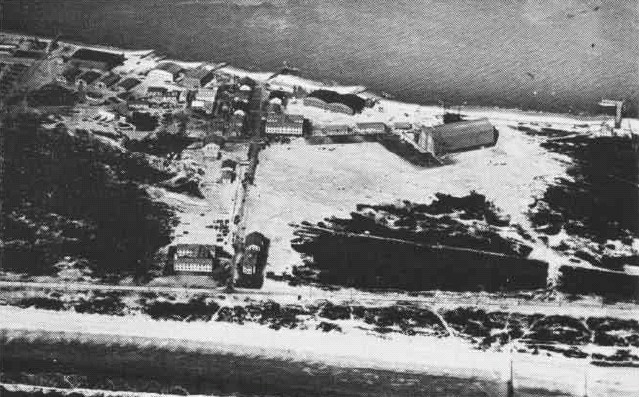
Aerial view of NAS Rockaway in 1917

In 1917, with the emergence of World War I, the park site was leased to the United States Navy to create Naval Air Station Rockaway, one of the first naval air stations in the country. A permit was issued by the Parks Department to the federal government on April 16, 1917, with 60 acres (24 ha) allotted to the base. The station began operations on October 15 of that year. An additional 34 acres (14 ha) were ceded to the station in March 1915. The now-94-acre (38 ha) base extended from Fort Tilden east to the location of the modern bathhouse. The station would be used as the departure point for the first transatlantic flight in 1919, accomplished by the Glenn Curtiss-designed NC-4. By the time the base was complete, the remaining 168 acres (68 ha) of the park had little development occurring.

On January 20, 1921, US Navy Rear Admiral James H. Glennon requested that the city cede the 94-acre (38 ha) site to the federal government in order to maintain the naval station. The request was initially refused, but the dispute continued on for the rest of the decade. The station was inactive from 1922 to 1925 and became an armory for the New York Naval Militia from 1928 to 1929. The dispute finally ended in 1930, when the Navy moved to facilities in Valley Stream, Long Island, North Beach Airport (now LaGuardia Airport), and later Floyd Bennett Field in Brooklyn directly across from Riis Park. The base was vacated by June 1930, and demolition of the base was ordered in October 1930.

=== Initial development of Riis Park ===
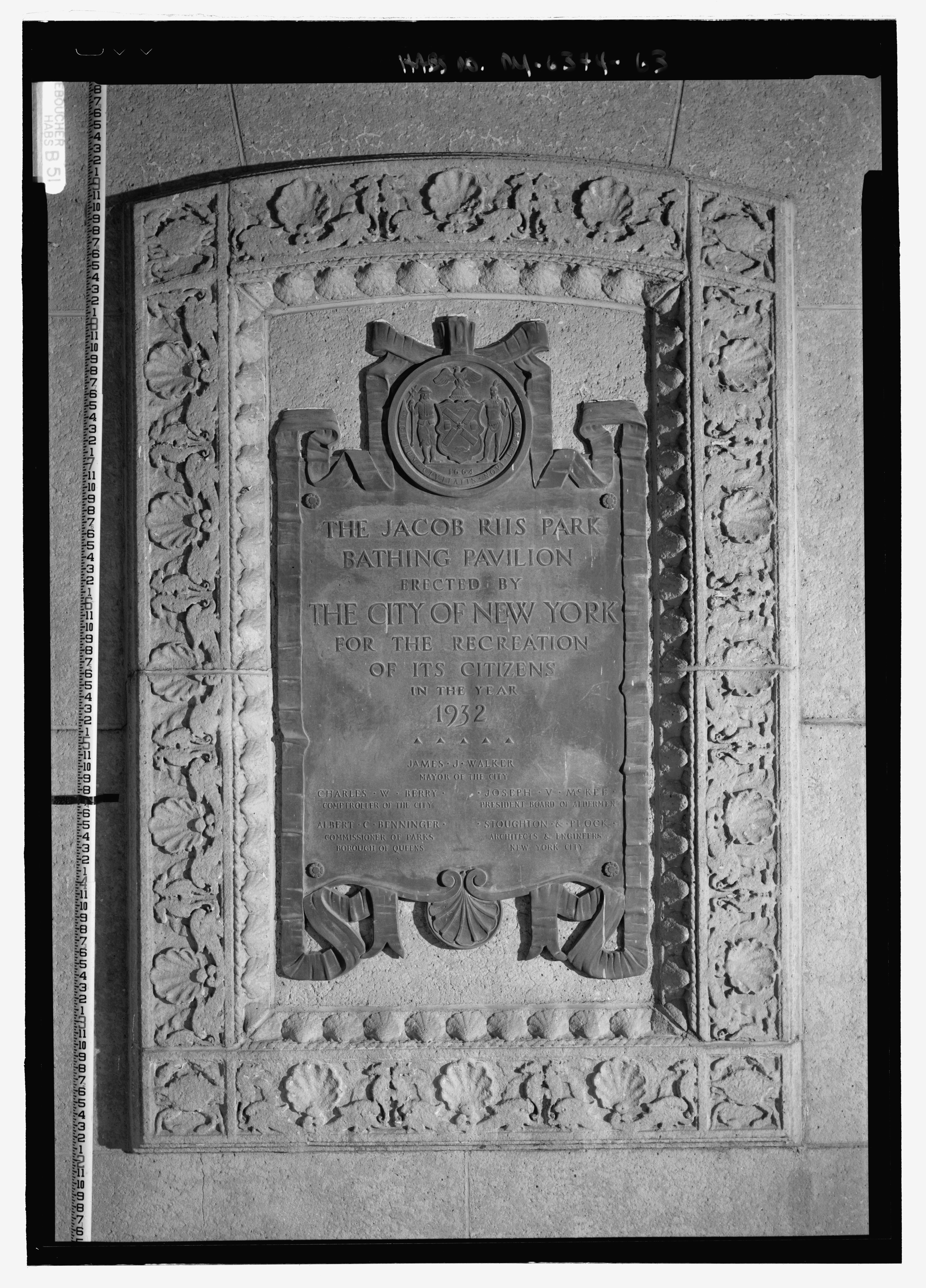
The 1932 plaque commemorating the completion of the bathhouse

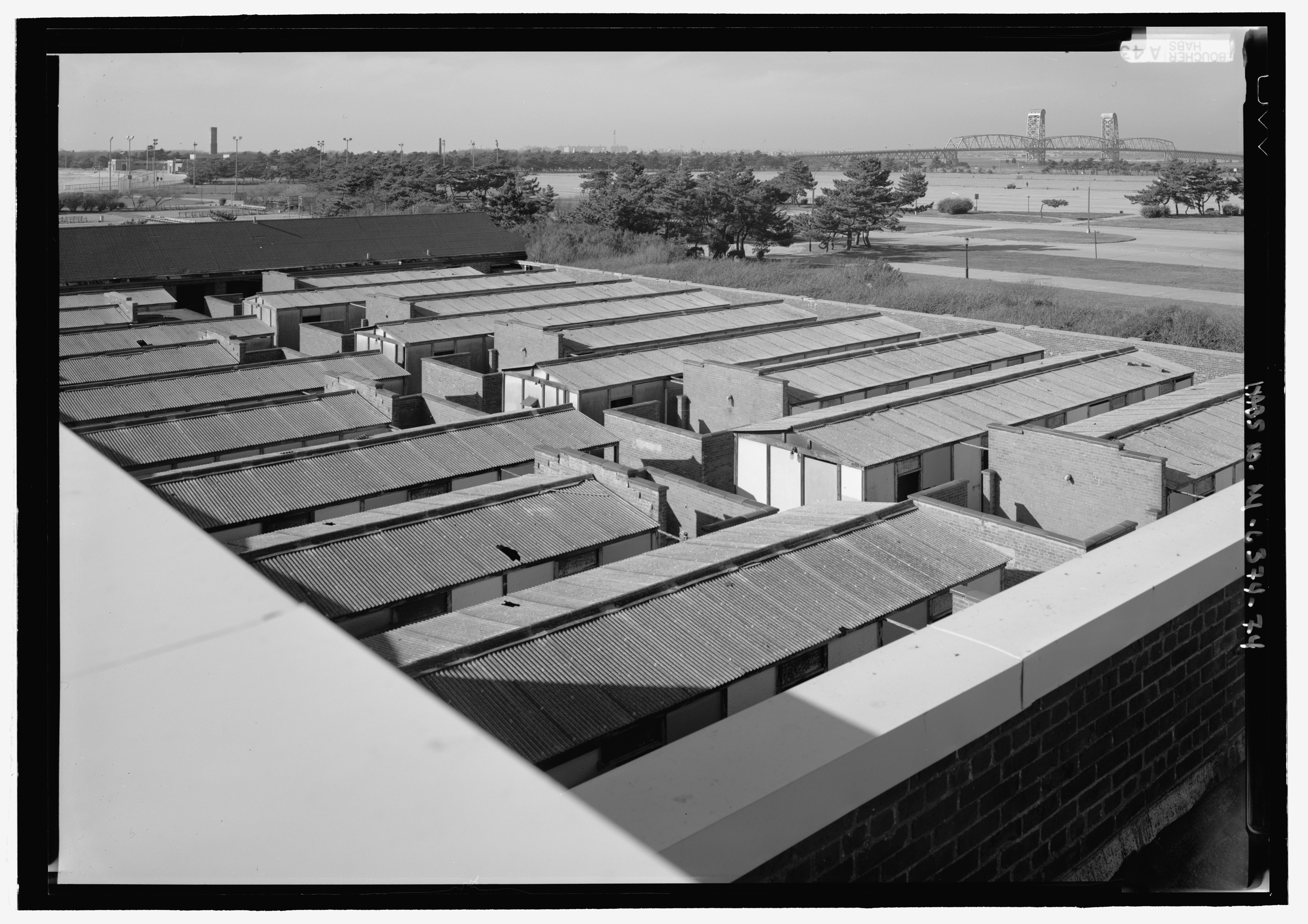
The changing rooms in the courtyard of the Riis Park bathhouse, since removed

On October 17, 1925, a ferry service was opened between Barren Island, Brooklyn (later Floyd Bennett Field airport) and Riis Park. In 1926, a short macadam transverse road was created between Washington Avenue and the ferry terminal. The road was later paved with concrete, and expanded from 20 feet (6.1 m) wide to 40 feet (12 m) wide. A small concession stand was also constructed at the west end of the park. From 1926 to 1927, the beach protection system was expanded to the western section of the park, with additional groins installed. From 1927 to 1929, Washington Avenue was widened and paved, with a sidewalk added to both Washington Avenue and the ferry transverse road. Other minor improvements to the park took place at this time. In July 1929, an existing 1,000-car parking lot was enlarged. By this time, the patronage of Jacob Riis Park was increasing. Meanwhile, in 1929 the New York City Board of Transportation released a major expansion plan for the New York City Subway. One of the new routes in the plan involved recapturing the New York, Woodhaven and Rockaway Railroad, which by this time became the Rockaway Beach Branch of the Long Island Rail Road, and extending it as a subway line west from Rockaway Park to Jacob Riis Park. The extension of the line to the park was never constructed.

After the remainder of Riis Park was relinquished by the Navy, in fall 1930 Queens Parks Commissioner Albert C. Benninger proposed the construction of a bathing pavilion at Jacob Riis Park. Benninger had been inspired by the design of the bathhouse at Jones Beach State Park, completed in August 1929 by then-Long Island Parks Commissioner Robert Moses. Prior to this, beach-goers were forced to change their clothes in their cars. The designs were prepared by architect John L. Plock in November 1930. The project was approved by the mayor's office in February 1931. The foundation of the building was completed in August 1931. Contracts were let for building construction in September 1931. Later that month, Benninger requested an additional $105,000 for the project from the New York City Board of Estimate, on top of the initial $425,000 appropriated. Construction began on November 23, 1931. The bathhouse was opened on August 6, 1932. At the time, it was only 60 percent completed. Additional work was completed in May 1933, including lockers, the restaurant, and the solarium. The solarium was expected to be the largest in the world at the time. A seawall running in front of the bathhouse along the beach and parking facilities for 5,000 cars were also completed by 1933. At this time, Riis Park received 25,000 daily visitors during summer months.

While the bathhouse was being constructed, several plans were evaluated for developing Riis Park. Carl Pilat's 1913 plan for the park was briefly revived in 1930, but not developed. On August 26, 1931, Commissioner Benninger invited several architects to a conference held in conjunction the New York chapters of the American Society of Landscape Architects. Among the architects invited included Gilmore D. Clarke, then the landscape architect for Westchester County, New York. Three plans were later created by independent groups, none of which were developed. The first was from Harold A. Caparn of the City Club's park committee in 1931. The second was created by Earl Morrow of the Regional Plan Association (RPA) in 1932. The third was drawn up by Julius V. Burgevin & Joseph Gatringer of the New York City Park Board in 1933. All the plans suggested developing the northern portion of the property in addition to the southern beach. When presenting the RPA's plans in May 1932, RPA president George McAneny referred to Pilat's plans as "no longer practical", due to the lack of provisions for highways and automobile parking. While presenting the park plan, McAneny also put forward plans for a vehicular bridge or tunnel between Floyd Bennett Field in Brooklyn and the Riis Park/Fort Tilden area, acting as an extension of Flatbush Avenue. Although the bathhouse was built based on the RPA plans, it and the other plans were rejected in part due to the difficulty and high cost of landscaping and planting in the area.

=== Expansion under Robert Moses ===
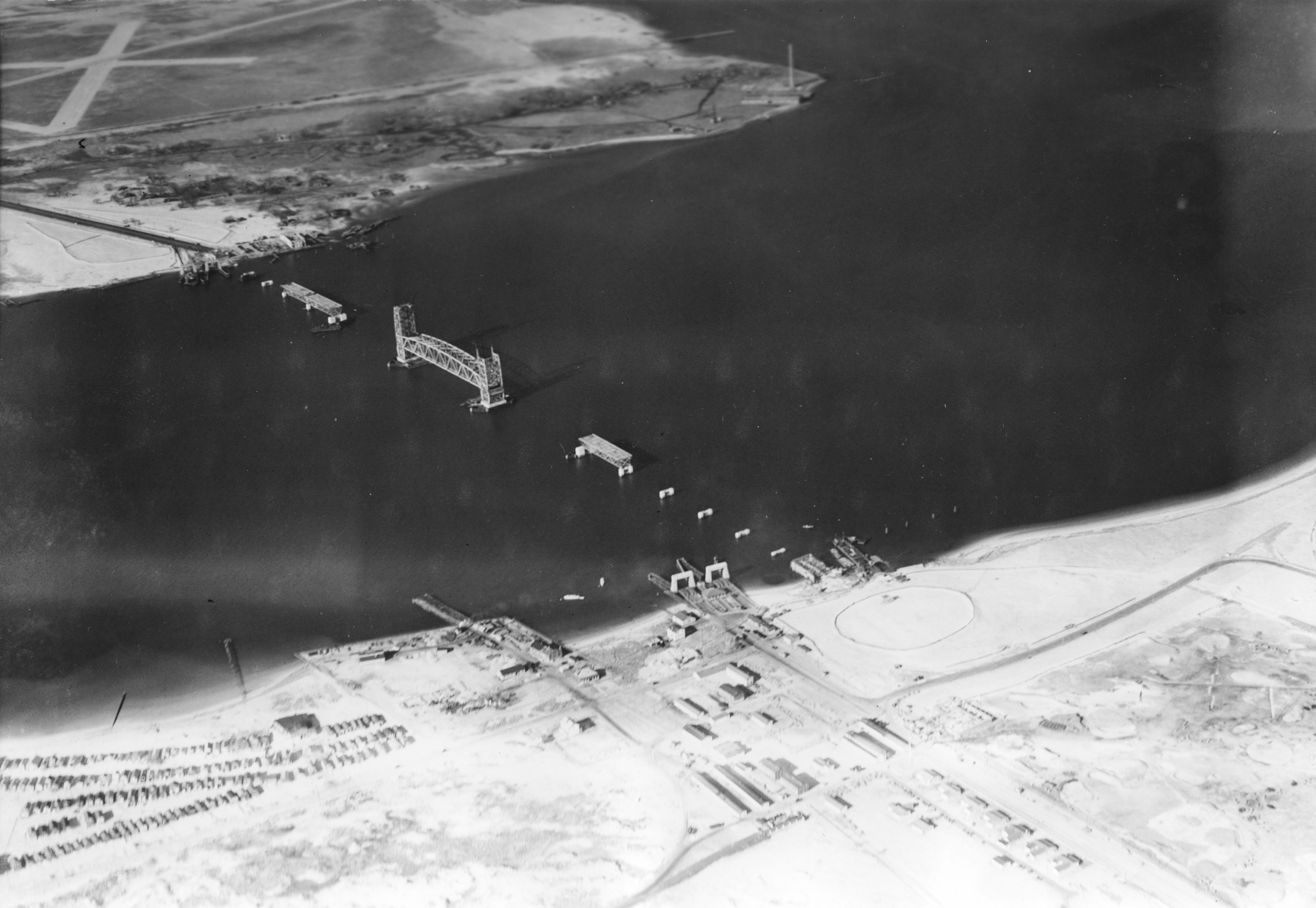
The construction of the Marine Parkway Bridge, Riis Park (bottom right), and Fort Tilden (bottom left) in 1937. The ferry landings at Riis Park/Fort Tilden and Floyd Bennett Field are also present.

In January 1934, Robert Moses was appointed commissioner of the New York City Department of Parks and Recreation, newly unified from the five borough departments. Moses wished to develop Riis Park into an urban iteration of Jones Beach for working-class New York City residents. Under Moses, alterations to the bathhouse began in April 1934 with funds from the Works Progress Administration (WPA). Moses was critical of the previous operation of the park, including the contracting of an outside firm to operate concessions and services, leading to deteriorating conditions in the park. Moses canceled nearly all outside contracts and formed the Riis Management Corporation to run services. Improvements to the other park structures were also completed as WPA projects. From 1934 to 1935, Riis Park was the only facility run by the Parks Department to generate revenue.

On August 6, 1934, Moses released his plan for Riis Park, designed by Gilmore D. Clarke, Julius Burgevin, W. Earle Andrews, and Clinton Loyd. The plan, designed in Beaux-Arts style, featured elements of the final design: the massive parking area for 15,000 cars, the road plan with a roundabout, and a central pedestrian mall running north to south. A second bathhouse structure would be built on the west side of the park, containing a swimming pool. Also included were a causeway and/or bridge linking to Brooklyn. Moses was also critical of several aspects of earlier park plans and the layout created under Benninger, including the placement of the bathhouse and seawall too close to the shore, and the lack of parking spaces. Moses believed the location of the bathhouse and bulkhead left a minimal portion of beach during high tide, and limited future expansion of the beach. The lack of parking, meanwhile, limited the use of the bathhouse, which could accommodate more people than the lot could fit cars. Under Moses's plan, the large parking lot would facilitate traffic from the Belt Parkway and the Marine Parkway Bridge. The 1934 plan was not implemented due to opposition from the local communities. Among the reasons for the resistance were fears of bringing in individuals from other parts of the city to the Rockaways, and the possibility of Riis Park out-competing privately owned beaches and resorts, leading to declines in property values.

In 1936, Moses released what would be the final plan for Jacob Riis Park, designed by Clarke, Loyd, and Parks Department architect Aymar Embury II. This plan moved the mall to the western end of the property, with a design similar to that of Orchard Beach which was being built in the Bronx at the same time. The parking area design was altered from two square lots in the 1934 plan, into the current large curved and asymmetrical lot. The bathhouse was reconfigured, shortening the face of the beach pavilion and altering its design to use simpler Art Deco elements. The modern road layout was created, which including altering the route of Rockaway Beach Boulevard in front of the bathhouse. Initially running at a diagonal to the bathhouse's front face, the boulevard was straightened and moved farther north. It was also truncated to the western end of the parking lot. The original seawall was replaced and recessed farther north along the new boardwalk. The mall buildings and golf course were also created at this time. In 1936, Moses asked the New York City Board of Estimate for $3.6 million to improve Jacob Riis Park, Fort Tryon Park, Pelham Bay Park, and the two Marine Parks. But these funds, along with similar amounts Moses requested from the Board of Estimate in each of the next several years, went mostly to build the Marine Parkway Bridge. Jacob Riis Park was completed for a total of $3.5 million, mostly from the WPA.

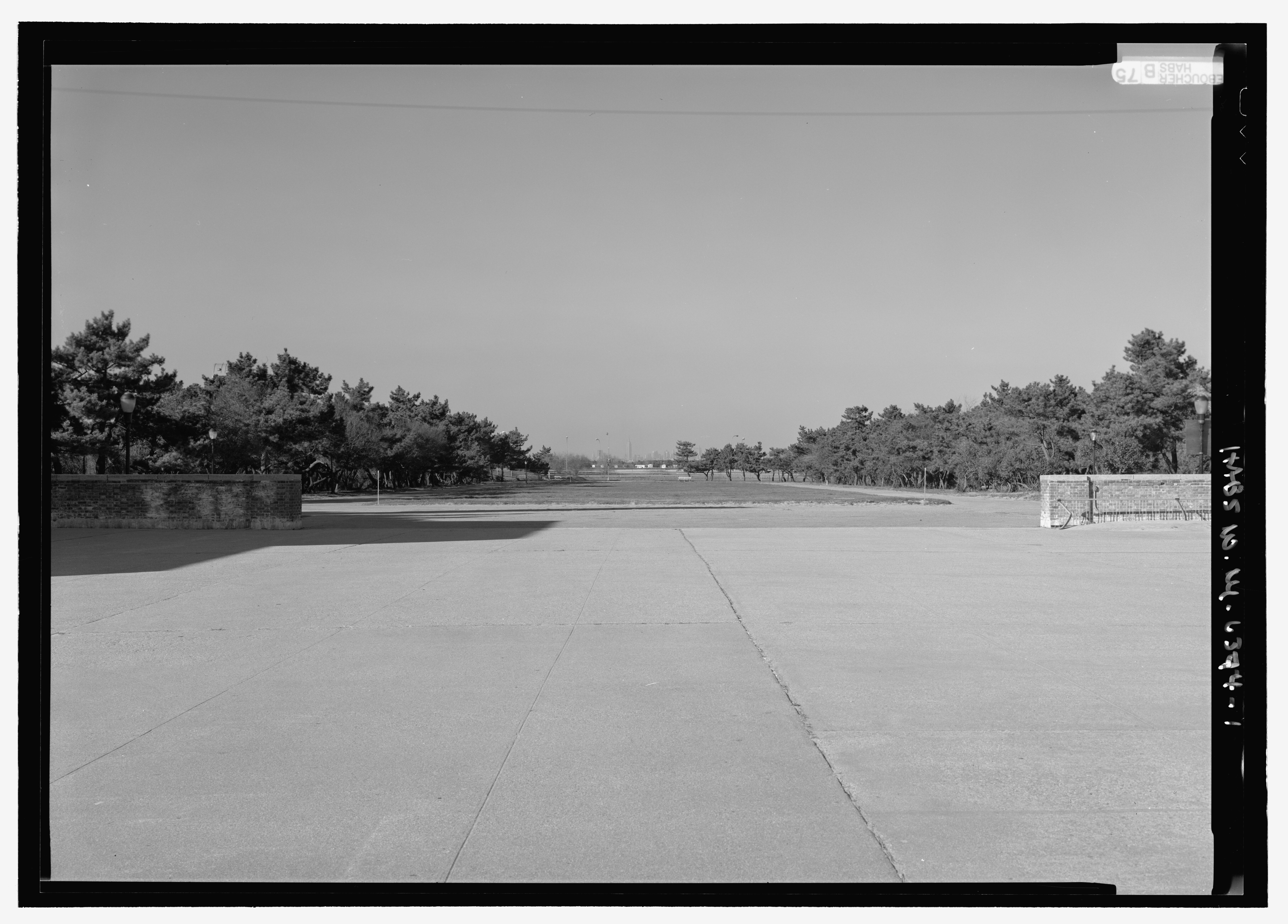
Looking north from the central mall, built in 1936. In the remote distance is the Empire State Building.

Work to enlarge the beach from 8 to 24 acres began on April 1, 1936. About 2,000,000 cubic yards (1,500,000 m^{3}) of sand were dredged from Jamaica Bay. The topography of the beach was leveled, with numerous dunes eliminated. The parking lot was partially opened in June 1936 with a 6,000-car capacity. On June 15, 1936, Green Bus Lines started the Q21B bus route, operating from Brooklyn and mainland Queens to Riis Park via Cross Bay Boulevard. The upgraded Jacob Riis Park was initially set to open along with Orchard Beach on June 19, 1937, but the openings were pushed back due to unfinished work. Both beaches were opened on June 25, 1937. Work on the parking lot and bathhouse were completed at this time.

The Marine Parkway Bridge was opened July 3, 1937, after which the ferry service to Riis Park was discontinued. With the opening of the bridge, Green Bus Lines created a new route, the Q35, operating across the bridge between Riis Park and the Flatbush−Nostrand Avenues station in Brooklyn. In addition, the Brooklyn Bus Corporation extended their B2 bus route to Riis Park. Due to increasing bus traffic, the Parks Department and the Brooklyn Bus Corporation constructed an enclosed bus shelter with turnstiles to expedite passenger boarding. On August 6, 1937, the park began holding weekly fireworks shows. The park's pitch and putt golf course was opened on May 14, 1938. The Belt Parkway system was opened in June 1940, connecting to the Marine Parkway Bridge.

A lighted softball field just west of the bathhouse was created in summer 1940. A bust of Jacob Riis at the western mall building was completed on October 14, 1940. The Wise and Son street clock was installed on the boardwalk on March 4, 1941. The bathhouse and other structures were waterproofed in 1943. The stairs from the beach and boardwalk to the second floor of the bathhouse were removed between 1948 and 1949. The second-floor cafeteria, meanwhile, was replaced with additional lockers, while a new cafeteria was built on the first floor. Numerous other renovations took place between 1949 and 1958.

=== Acquisition of Neponsit Hospital property ===
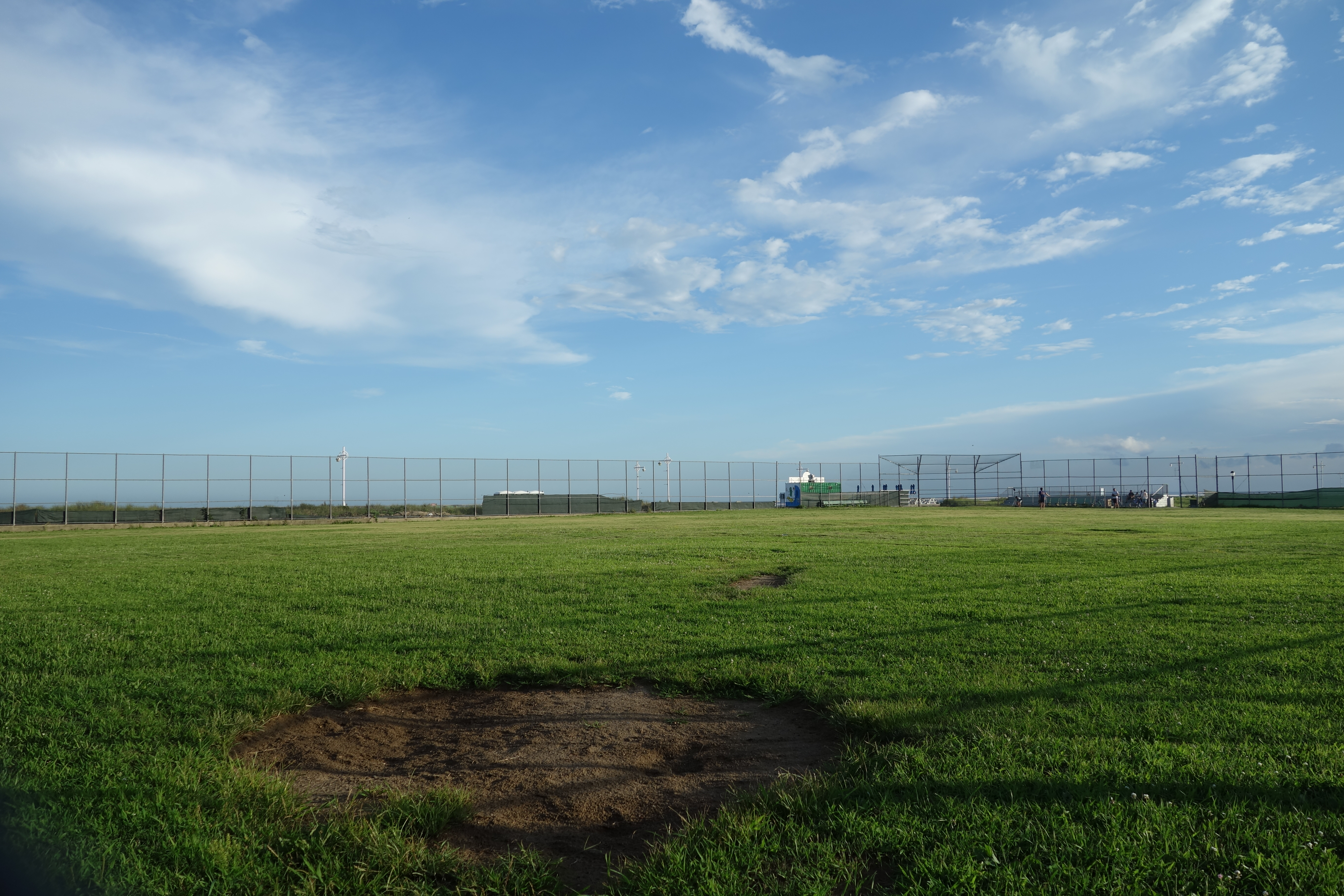
These two baseball diamonds were built on the former land of Neponsit Beach Hospital, which was ceded back to Riis Park in 1959.

Neponsit Beach Hospital was closed on April 21, 1955, due to a declining need for tuberculosis treatment. Following the closure of the hospital, the site was considered a "hot property", located on the beach in the fairly exclusive Neponsit neighborhood. The 14.3 acres (5.8 ha) site of the hospital was valued at $1 million. Numerous groups had conflicting interests in the future of the site, with Parks Commissioner Moses wishing to absorb the site back into Riis Park in order to construct sports fields, a swimming pool, and a comfort station, and to extend the beach. Others including New York City Comptroller Lawrence E. Gerosa desired for the property to be sold and developed, which would draw income from both the sale and taxes. After the Board of Estimate including Gerosa voted 10 to 6 to block the park expansion, and angry exchanges between Moses and Gerosa, on October 27, 1956, New York Supreme Court Justice Peter M. Daly ruled in favor of Moses in a lawsuit by the Park Association of New York City, preventing the sale. The ruling was upheld by the Appellate Court in Brooklyn on July 9, 1956. The ruling referred to the original 1906 act which zoned the property exclusively for park or hospital use.

In 1958, a compromise was reached in which the hospital would be converted into a nursing home called the Neponsit Home for the Aged. Meanwhile, the remaining 10 acres (4.0 ha) of the property were turned over to the Parks Department to expand Riis Park, adding 1,000 feet (300 m) of beach. The plan was approved by New York City Board of Estimate in February 1959. A field with two baseball diamonds was created adjacent to the west of the former hospital in 1961, with a comfort station and concession stand erected at the southwest corner of the field.

=== Decline and creation of Gateway National Recreation Area ===
By the 1960s, Riis Park had fallen into a state of disrepair; debris "[blanketed] huge areas" of the beach, the toilet and bathhouse facilities were suffering from a lack of maintenance, and the underpass between the bathhouse and the parking lot frequently flooded after rainfall. The park was damaged by the Ash Wednesday Storm in March 1962. Riis Park also experienced an increase in crime: an 18-year-old was fatally stabbed at the beach in May 1962, and the bust of Jacob Riis at the Central Mall was stolen in June 1964. In addition to vandalism, there were increasing arrests for drug-related offenses on the beach.

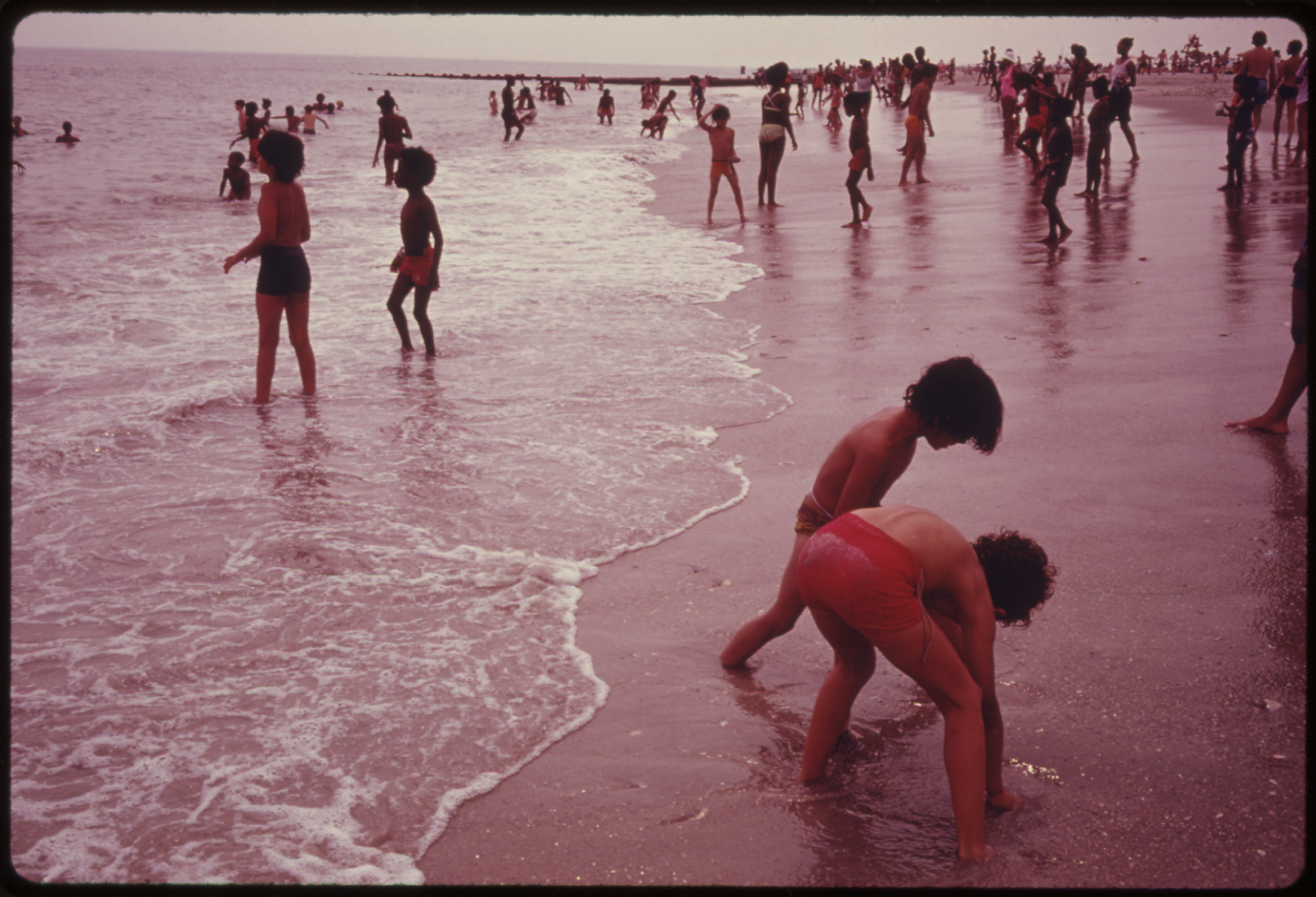
Beach-goers at Riis Park in 1974, after it was absorbed into the Gateway National Recreation Area

In 1972, the National Park Service established the Gateway National Recreation Area around Jamaica Bay. Jacob Riis Park was ceded to the NPS two years later, on March 4, 1974. Upon takeover, focus was put on Riis Park due to it being the most heavily visited part of the Gateway Area. Under NPS' purview, several renovations occurred, including the installation of new roofing on the bathhouse and mall buildings, and the restoration of the Wise Clock which had been taken out of operation. The NPS also began to crack down on nude bathing on the beach. In mid-July 1974, Federal Magistrate Vincent A. Catoggio suggested that the entire park be shuttered if "it is going to be a gathering place of nudists" and around the same time, United States Park Police started issuing summonses to nude bathers who ignored orders to put clothes on. On July 24, 1974, a bill was introduced to the New York City Council to ban nude bathing. In spite of this, NPS rangers and officers maintained a policy of allowing nude bathers to remain so long as they "minded their own business." Nudity in the park was ended by a state law in 1983.

On June 29, 1976, Riis Park was closed due to raw sewage in the water. It was closed again August 3, 1978 along with beaches in Brooklyn after an oil spill near Breezy Point. The park reopened on August 7, 1978. Riis Park continued to have sewage and wastewater treatment problems. On July 17, 1988, the beach was closed after eight syringes washed up onto the beach. Beaches at South Beach, Midland Beach, and Great Kills Park in Staten Island had previously been closed due to the same issue. The beach was reopened on July 22. Much of the waste that had washed up on the beaches in the area had originated in Fresh Kills Landfill or the city sewer system.

In the 1980s during summer months on weekends, the B9 and B46 bus routes were extended south of their normal terminus at Kings Plaza in Brooklyn to Riis Park, with a federal subsidy funding the extension. The park's historic district was listed on the National Register of Historic Places in 1981. Nude bathing was banned at the beach in 1983, although it continued to persist unlawfully afterwards.

=== Proposed amphitheater and water park ===
In May 1988, the National Park Service planned to put the Riis Park bathhouse and mall buildings up for lease, along with other buildings in the Gateway Area. The developers would then pay for renovations and upgrades to the park and its facilities, which the NPS did not have the money to fund. The bathhouse in particular was in a state of disrepair, with its showering and changing facilities closed. The plan proposed constructing a 15,000-seat performance amphitheater, and a water park. Both attractions would be erected on the site of the golf course at the west end of the park. The amphitheater would occupy the northern half of the golf course site, facing south towards the beach. The water park would sit at the south end, and have a 7,500 person capacity. The golf course would be relocated to the east end of the park. Features would also be added to the bathhouse, including a restaurant, skating rinks, a public garden, and/or a swimming pool.

The plan was opposed by local residents and conservation groups, including the Sierra Club's New York branch and the National Audubon Society. Among the points of contention were the idea of using federal parkland for amusement development, the additional noise and traffic created by the attractions, and the potential of disturbing the bird habitats in the area. The debate was reflective of issues with the country's national parks as a whole. Queens Community Board 14 (representing the Rockaways) voted unanimously to block the plans.

By July 1989, the amphitheater was removed from the development plan. The proposed water park was downsized from 10 acres (4.0 ha) to 2 acres (0.81 ha), and would only occupy a small corner at the southwest section of the golf course. The changes did not eliminate opposition from the community or environmental groups. By October of that year, the development plans were dropped and instead $934,000 was allocated for renovations to the park.

=== 1990s and 21st-century renovation attempts ===
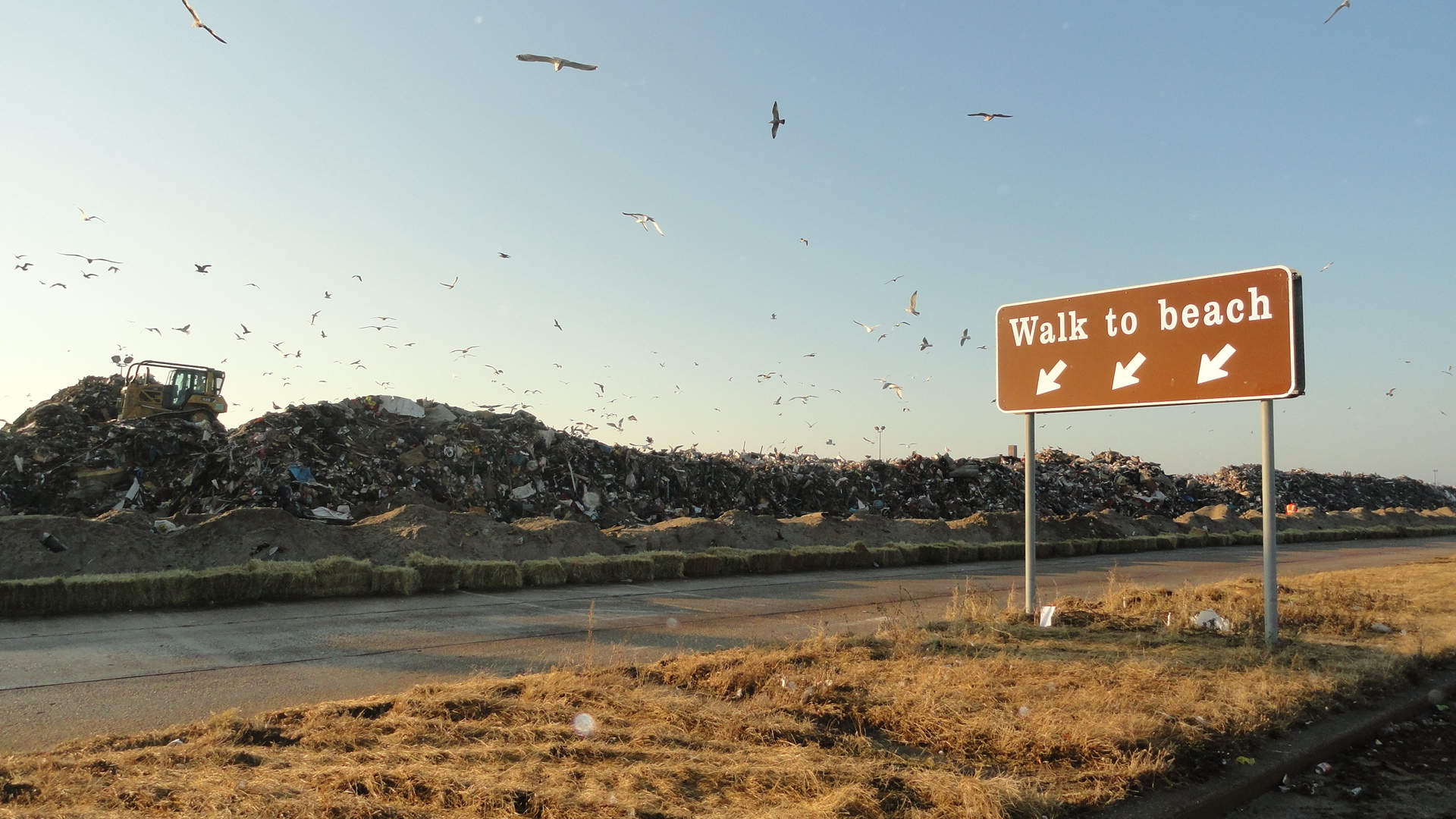
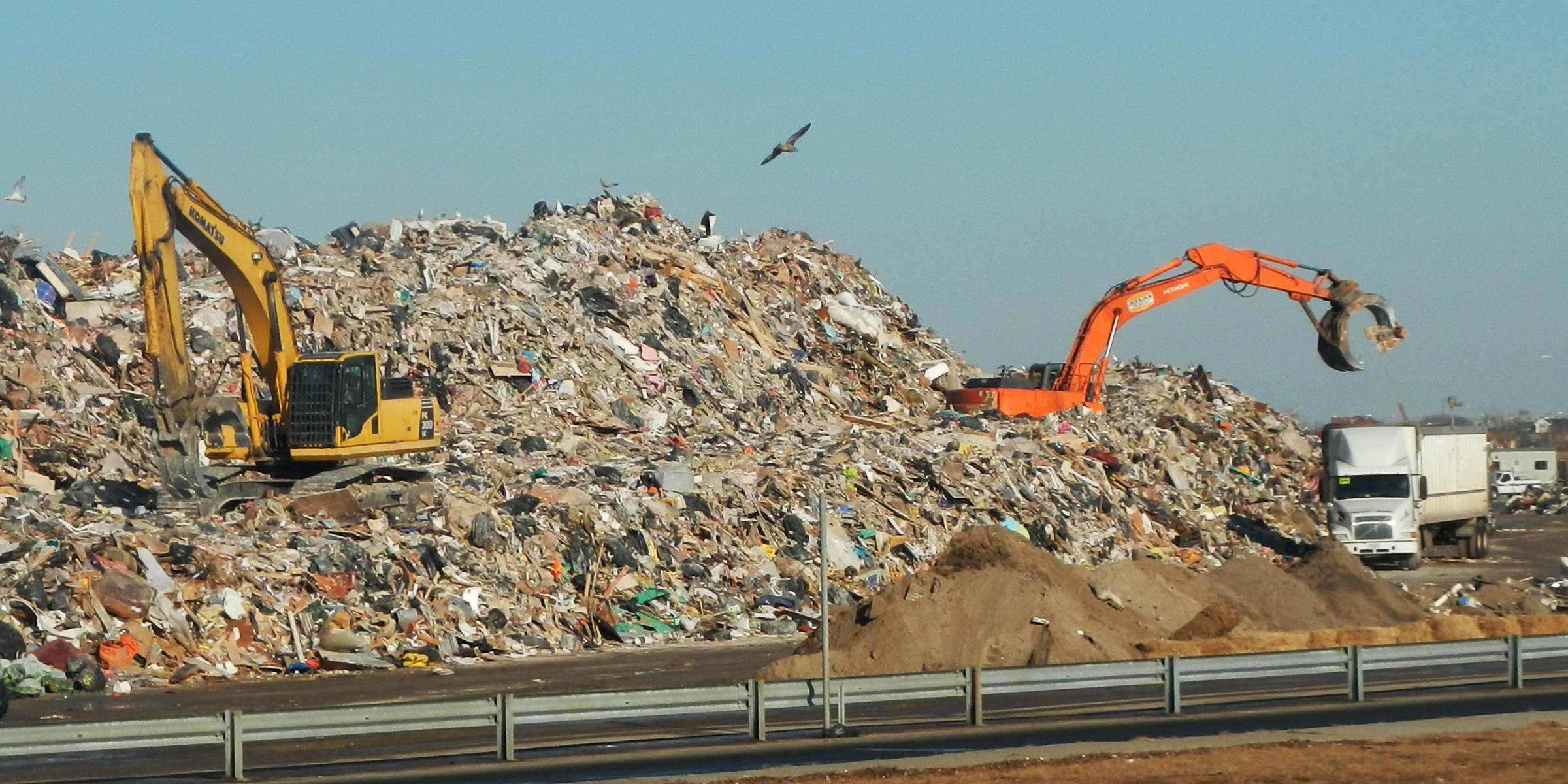
Looking at the Riis Park parking lot in 2012, used as a temporary dump to store debris after Hurricane Sandy

On August 31, 1991, the beach was closed again due to the presence of medical waste, with over 500 items found including needles and medicine vials of the painkiller Nubain. The beach was closed for a single day. Due in part to the reoccurrence of waste on the beach, the park saw declining patronage that year. During that year, a $20 million rehabilitation of the bathhouse began, which included the removal of asbestos. However, the project was not completed, and the bathhouse remained closed and continued to decay.

In 1999, the federal government earmarked $450,000 for the rehabilitation of Riis Park, which was projected to be complete within five years. By 2001, then-Senators Hillary Clinton and Chuck Schumer and then-Congressman Anthony Weiner had secured another $4 million in funds, most of which were targeted toward the renovation of the bathhouse. A press release from Senator Schumer alluded to the possible construction of a pool with the $4 million, possibly located in the bathhouse. On the other hand, the National Park Service planned to use the money for general renovations. However, the pool plan was canceled after a preliminary study, which determined that the operation of the pool would result in a negative profit margin.

Through 2005, numerous improvements were performed on the bathhouse, with plans to repave the central courtyard. By July 2006, however, the repairs had not been finished. However, a new bust depicting Jacob Riis had been installed at the Central Mall that April.

In late October 2012, Hurricane Sandy struck the New York City area, particularly affecting the Rockaway Peninsula. At Riis Park, sand was pushed north from the beach onto the back beach areas. The bathhouse was flooded and damaged. However, structures like the Wise Clock and the new Jacob Riis bust were generally unscathed. During the recovery effort, the large parking lot was used as a temporary dump for debris from the park and the entire peninsula. This included excess sand, trees, cars, boats, and household debris. The parking lot was selected as a waste facility due to its size, location on the peninsula, and connection to highways and roads. Afterwards, the parking lot was used to clean sand before it returned to the beaches on the peninsula. Because of this the lot was filled with numerous man-made dunes. The park reopened in May 2013.

Repairs to the bathhouse occurred from 2015 to 2016, after which the NPS solicited requests for proposals to reuse the entry pavilion and bathhouse. In 2022, CBSK was hired to renovate and redevelop the bathhouse as a private club and hotel at a cost of $50 million, with Beyer Blinder Belle as renovation architect. The developers borrowed $47.5 million to pay for the redevelopment. Following an $88 million restoration, the bathhouse opened in July 2026 as the Rockaway Ocean Club. The private club was the first part of the bathhouse to reopen. The project includes concessions, a 28-room hotel, and a rooftop restaurant, while the private club section hosts lounges, a restaurant, and a pool.

=== Pipeline proposal ===
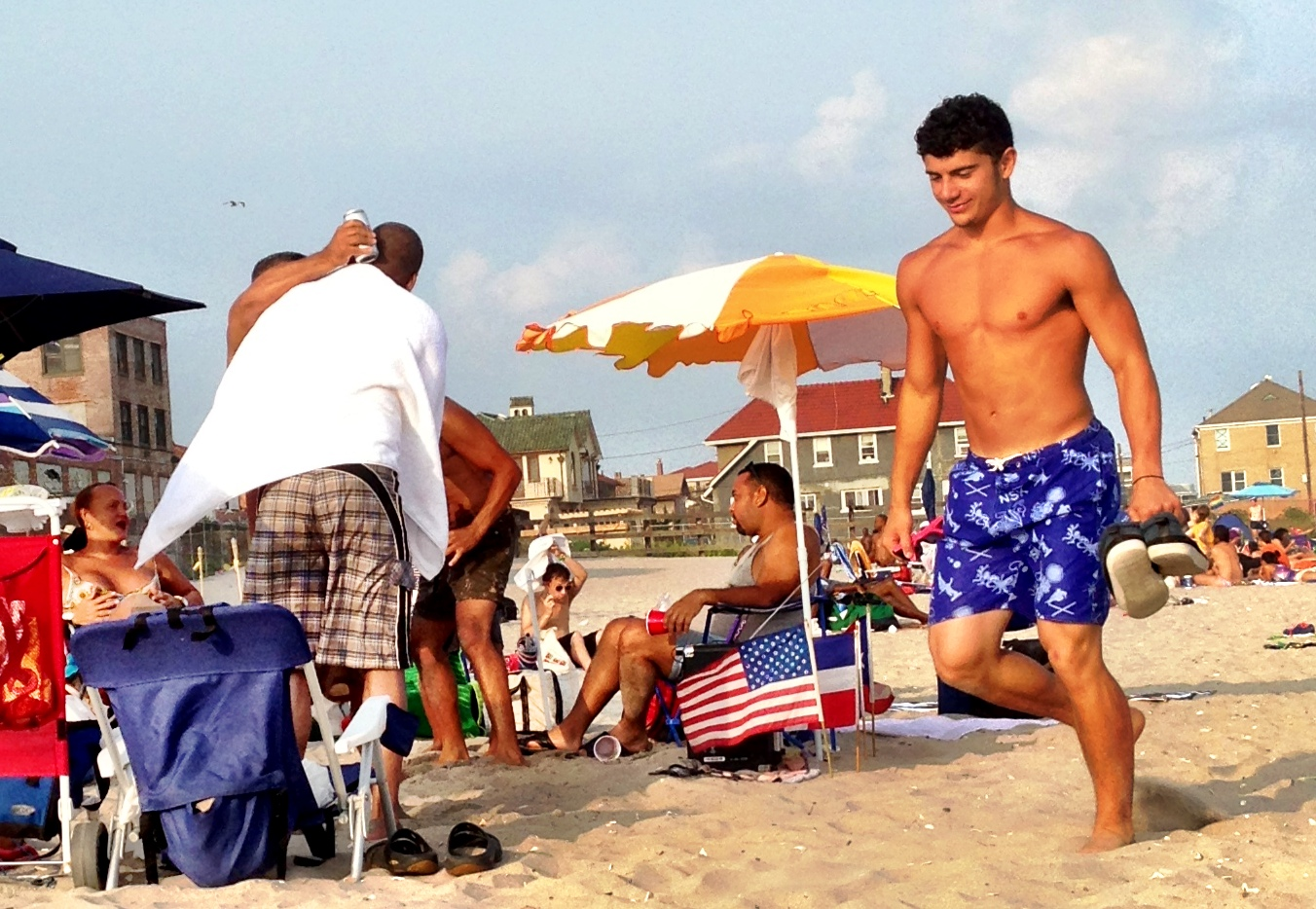
People enjoying the beach over Labor Day weekend in August 2013

On July 21, 2011, Staten Island Congressman Michael G. Grimm introduced H.R. 2606, the New York City Natural Gas Supply Enhancement Act, to the U.S. Congress. As proposed in the bill, a 3-mile (4.8 km) natural gas pipeline called the Rockaway Delivery Lateral Project, proposed by Williams Companies, would connect to an existing offshore pipeline and running south-to-north through the sites of Jacob Riis Park and Floyd Bennett Field. The pipeline would run through the golf course of Riis Park, then connect to a new 1.5-mile (2.4 km) along Flatbush Avenue to be constructed by National Grid. The project was supported by the district manager of Queens Community Board 14. Two Queens congressmen also supported the pipeline, as did Anthony Weiner before his resignation. The pipeline was opposed by local environmental groups, who felt it would disturb a nearby artificial reef. Grimm was subsequently found to have received campaign money from both Williams and National Grid.

Shortly after Hurricane Sandy, on November 7, 2012, the Rockaway Lateral Pipeline bill was signed into law. The pipeline was put in service by May 2015.

=== Demolition of Neponsit Hospital ===
In both its time as a functioning hospital and after its abandonment, the Neponsit Hospital's buildings were recognized by researchers and beachgoers alike as having sheltered LGBTQ gathering at Bay 1. In October 2018, Ms. Colombia, Jackson Heights-based performance artist, died at Bay 1. Her family and friends built a memorial to honor her life and her love of Riis. The memorial is located on a chainlink fence around the former Neponsit Hospital site. An annual Ms. Colombia Memorial Beach Walk is hosted along the beach each August.

In April 2022, the New York City government announced plans to demolish the remains of the Neponsit Beach Hospital. In its abandonment, the former Neponsit Hospital buildings became the site of LGBT-affirming public art. The former Neponsit Hospital building was demolished in early 2023.

=== LGBTQ history ===
The easternmost end of the park's beach, Bays 1 and 2, has been a site of LGBTQ gathering since at least the 1940s. While it was a "well-known destination for mostly white gay men to sunbathe and cruise" in the 1940s, lesbian women also began to gather nearby by the 1950s. In the 1960s, the beach became clothing optional and many people referred to it as "Screech Beach" in reference to its gay beachgoers. The beach remained clothing optional until July 3, 1983, when a state law banning bottomlessness went into effect. Despite the allowance for nudity, police were known to arrest men for wearing "too minimal" suits on the boardwalk.

Fieldwork sponsored by the NPS in 1974 describes Bays 1 and 2's population as predominantly white with a notable contingent of Black and Latino beachgoers– with many Black gay beachgoers moving between Bays 1 and 2 and the boardwalk behind Bay 5, known as a site of historically Black gathering–while NPS fieldwork from 2000 reports a demographic shift to "a predominance of blacks and Hispanics" at Bay 1. The beach continues to be of particular significance to queer and trans people of color. Pride in the City, a New York City Black pride event, was held at a softball field adjacent to Bay 2 in 2006, drawing a crowd of thousands. G.L.I.T.S., an organization dedicated to providing healthcare and housing to Black transgender people, organized Riis Pride at the beach in 2022.

Riis as an LGBTQ gathering space has been mentioned in several works of literature including Audre Lorde's Zami, Torrey Peters' Detransition, Baby, and Sabrina Imbler's How Far the Light Reaches. Notable LGBTQ beachgoers include:

- Harvey Milk, LGBTQ activist and icon, who met his partner of six years, Joe Campbell, at the beach in 1956
- Audre Lorde, writer and activist, who wrote about going to the gay beach at Riis on summer Saturdays in the mid-1950s in her biomythography, Zami. A photo of her and her children there in the 1960s was featured in the exhibition, "Powerful and Dangerous: The Images and Words of Audre Lorde," at Alice Austen House in 2021.
- Ernestine Eckstein, activist and leader of the New York chapter of the Daughters of Bilitis
- Joan Nestle, writer and founder of the Lesbian Herstory Archives, writes that going to Riis Park in the 1960s was her "deepest joy."
- Craig Rodwell, activist, who wrote of being arrested at Riis for a too-short bathing suit
- Ms. Colombia, performer and LGBTQ icon, who also died at Bay 1.

== Description ==
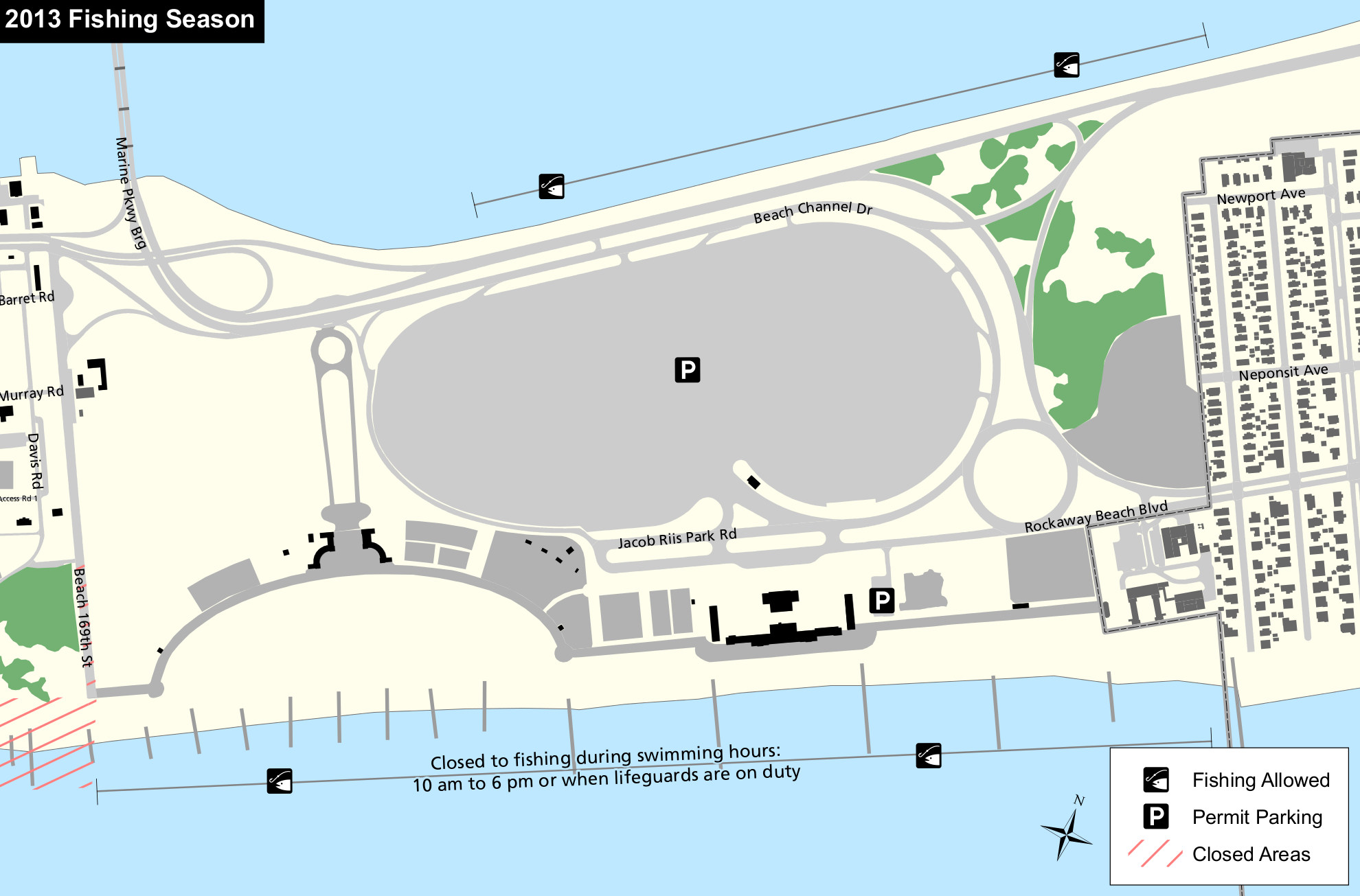
A map of Jacob Riis Park

Jacob Riis Park is located at the west end of the Rockaway Peninsula, between Fort Tilden and the Marine Parkway–Gil Hodges Memorial Bridge to the west, and the Neponsit neighborhood to the east. The Roxbury and Breezy Point neighborhoods sit farther west. The Atlantic Ocean coast marks the south end of the site, where the park's beaches are located. The north end is bound by Beach Channel Drive and the Jamaica Bay shore. The park is approximately 262 acres (106 ha) in size, extending 1 mile (1.6 km) east-to-west between Beach 149th Street in Neponsit and Beach 169th Street at Fort Tilden.

The major east-to-west thoroughfares running across the park are Beach Channel Drive and Rockaway Beach Boulevard, the latter of which runs near the south end of the park at the north end of the beach. Beach Channel Drive feeds west into the Marine Parkway Bridge, and into Rockaway Point Boulevard which runs to Roxbury and Breezy Point. Both roads run east towards the rest of the Rockaways. A roundabout at the east end of the park provides an interchange between the two roads. The road layout was designed in the 1930s.

Three buildings constructed in the 1930s are the primary features of the Riis Park Historical District. These are the bathhouse and the two Central Mall buildings. Many elements of the park, including the mall buildings, boardwalk, and renovations to the bathhouse, were completed during the 1936–1937 renovation of the park with Works Progress Administration funds, under the watch of Robert Moses, Gilmore D. Clarke, and Aymar Embury II.

=== Features ===
==== Bathhouse ====
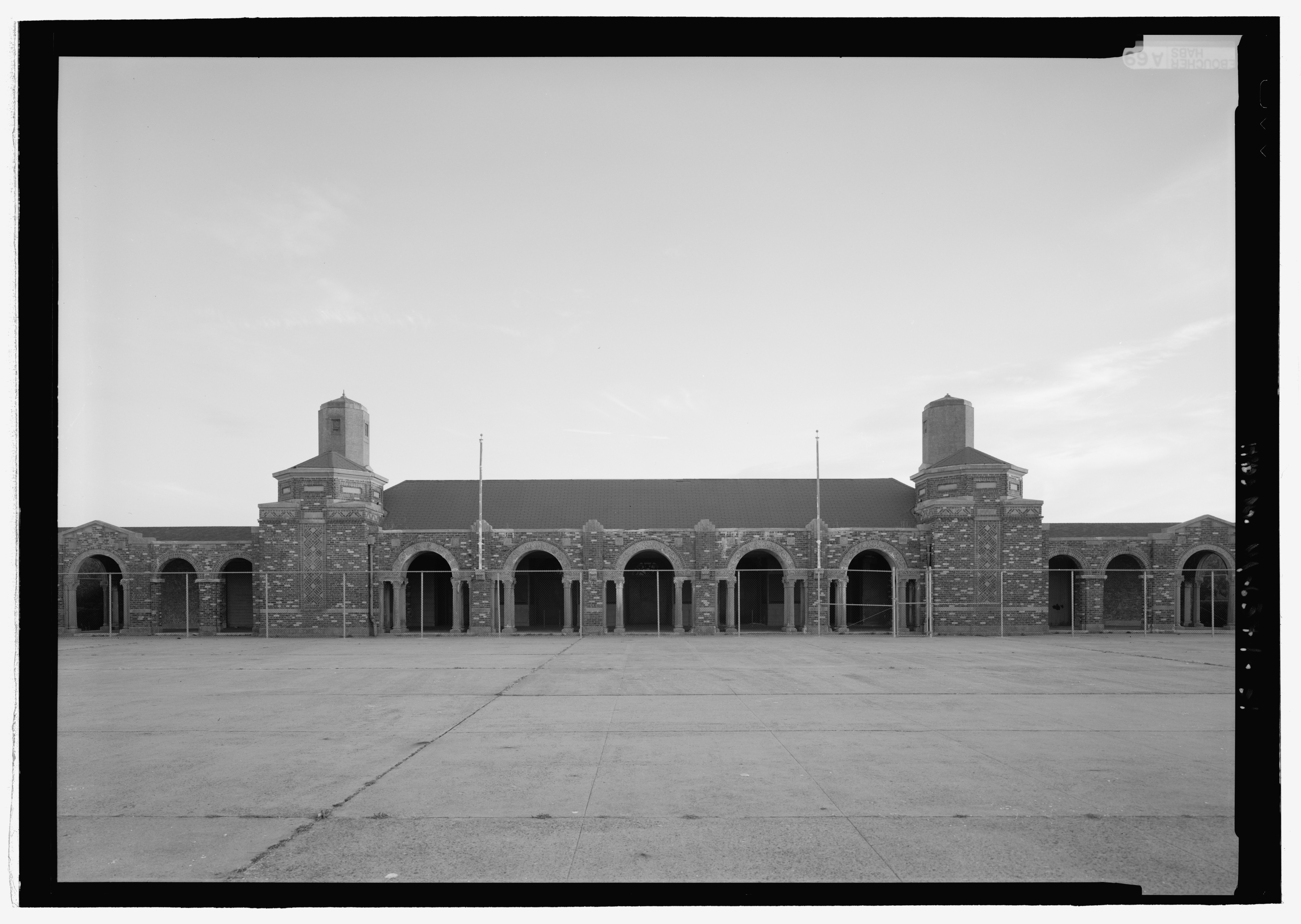
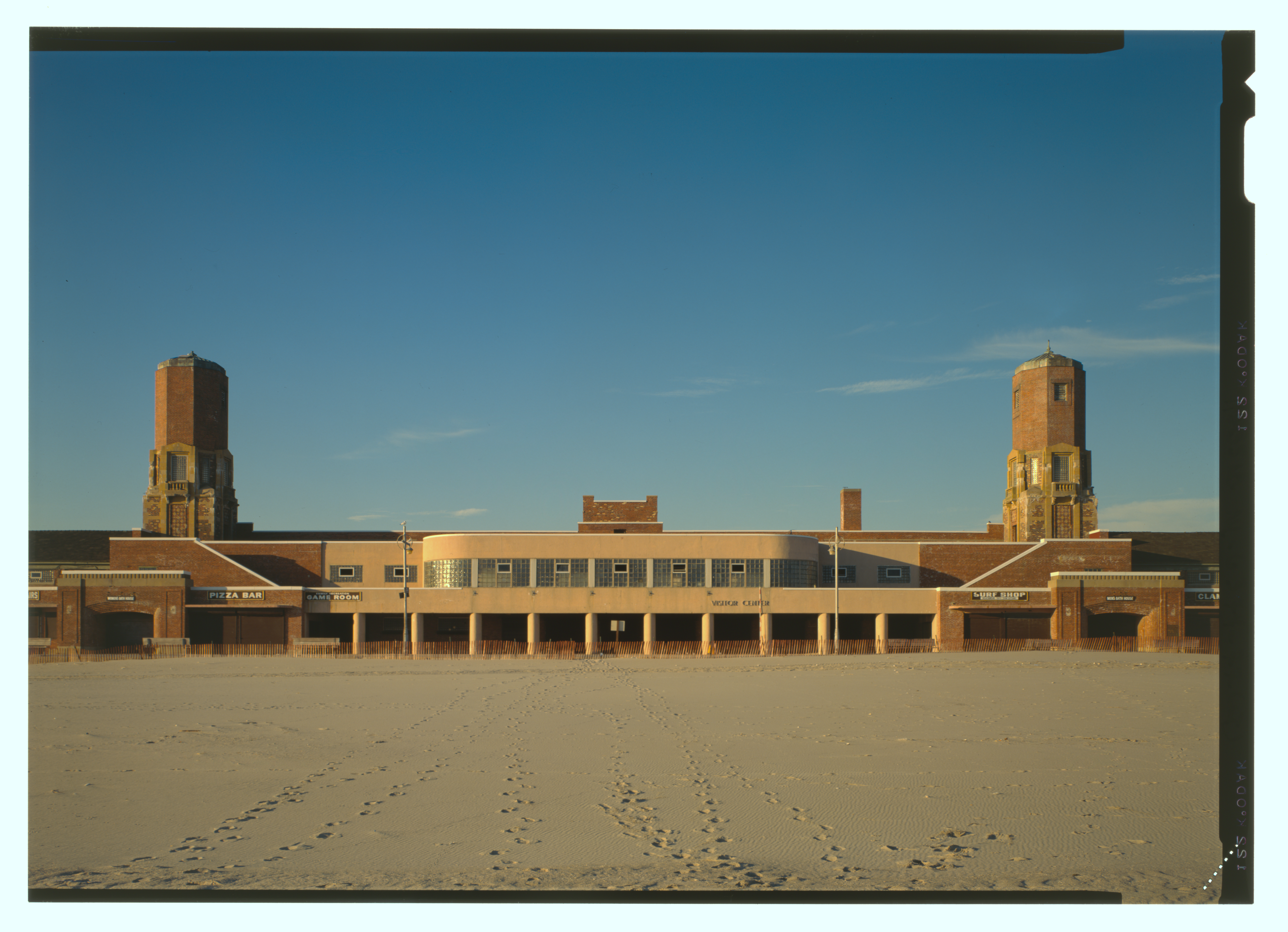
The front or north structure of the bathhouse (top), called the entrance pavilion, and rear structure of the bathhouse (bottom), known as the "beach pavilion", in 1990

Located on the south side of Rockaway Beach Boulevard near the horizontal center of the park is the bathhouse, which has historically served as the entrance to the beach. It was first completed in 1932, designed by John L. Plock of the Stoughton and Plonck firm in Moorish/Byzantine style. The 1936–1937 WPA project led to a reconfiguration of the bathhouse, designed by Clinton Loyd, which added Art Deco/Art Moderne elements. The alteration in architectural style is said to have been brought on by Robert Moses being "annoyed" by the bathhouse's original Moorish elements. The bathhouse measures approximately 640 feet (200 m) long and 250 feet (76 m) wide. It was modeled after the Jones Beach bathhouse, and is similar in design to other bathing pavilions of the early 20th century. It is the largest building in the park.

The bathhouse actually consists of four individual structures making up each face of the building, linked by common outer screen walls, with a central courtyard in between. The screen walls are brick and rise 8 feet (2.4 m) high. The buildings share a common outer facade in terms of materials, consisting of brick laid in american bond, cast stone, and concrete. After the 1937 renovations, the entire structure was painted in light gray.

At the front or north face of the site on Rockaway Beach Boulevard is the Entry Pavilion. The one-story structure was built in 1932 as part of the original bathhouse, and retains its Moorish and Byzantine features. Loosely T-shaped, it occupies 10,000 square feet (930 m^{2}) of space. The front face of the building features two small towers or turrets near each end, with an octagonal shape. In between the towers is an arcade, with five brick archways supported by concrete Corinthian columns. The columns are hexagonal in shape with arabesque features. An additional archway is located at both the east and west ends of the arcade. Six hipped skylights are located on the roof of the pavilion.

At the rear of the bathhouse, facing the beach, is the "bathing pavilion" or "beach pavilion", often simply called the "bathhouse". It is two stories high and rectangular in shape, made up of two brick side sections and a concrete center section. Although built as a part of the 1932 bathhouse, the building underwent extensive renovations during the 1936–1937 projects, leading to its current Art Deco characteristics. Unlike the entrance pavilion which is relatively small, the beach pavilion extends the entire east-west length of the building. An arcade or colonnade is located on the ground floor of the center section, largely concrete with columns. The original design of the beach pavilion was similar to that of the entrance building, with numerous Moorish arches forming its arcade. On the second floor on top of the arcade is a concrete projection with rounded edges, enclosed by glass brick windows. These windows are not original to the structure. The projection originally contained a cafeteria or restaurant and its kitchen. It also doubled as a solarium, and is often referred to as such. A terrace surrounds the projection. The center section's roof is flat, used as an additional terrace, while the side sections have hipped roofs. The beach pavilion contains two octagonal towers which rise four stories high with copper roofs. Several windows are located on the towers. External stairs on either side originally led from the beach to the terrace on the second floor, with additional staircases to the roof of the structure; the outdoor stairs from the ground have since been removed.

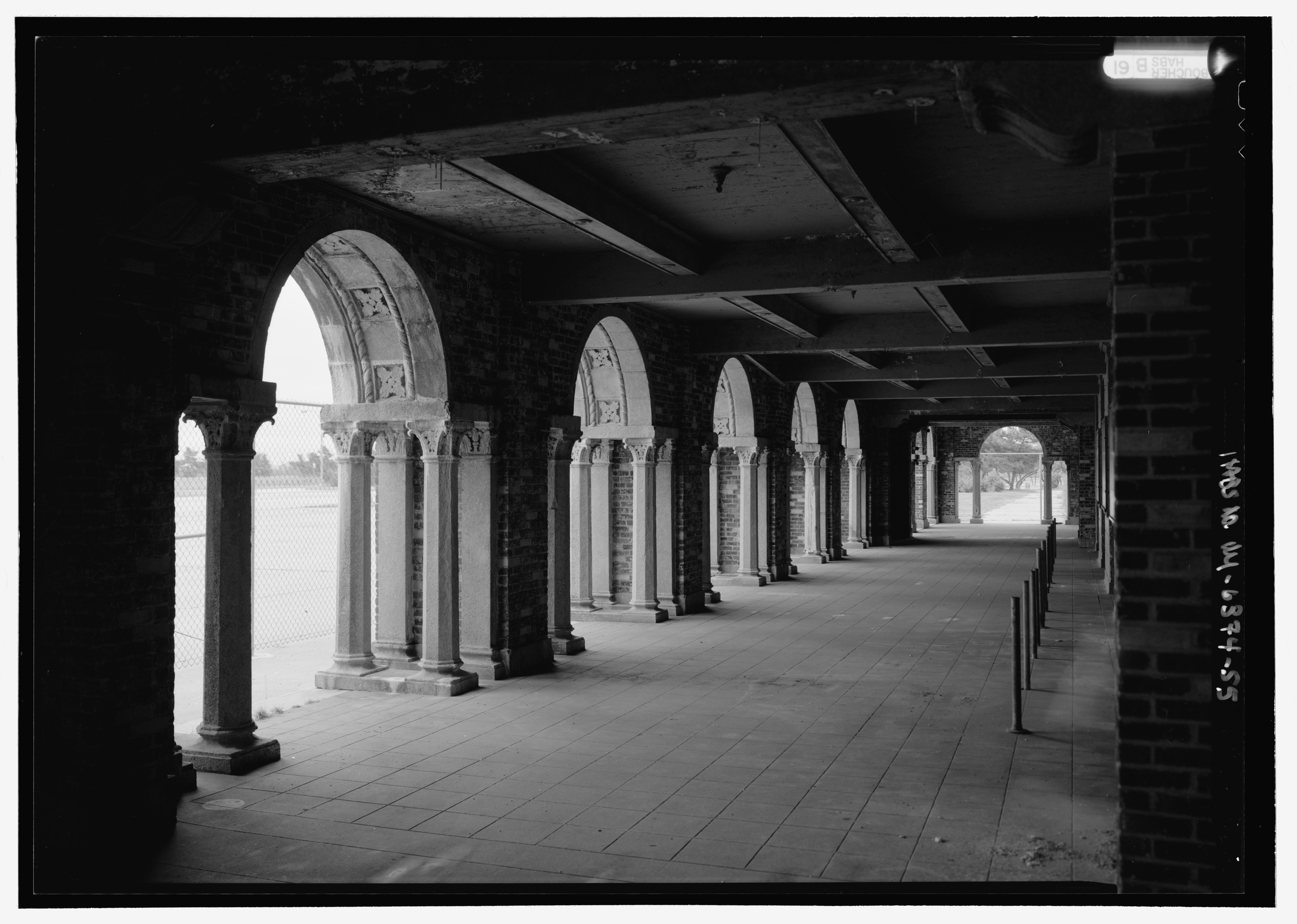
Inside the front arcade of the bathhouse, with its Moorish arches

At the east and west ends of the bathhouse are the east and west wing buildings. The wings are identical one-story rectangular buildings. They were built with the original bathhouse, with the east wing renovated in 1936. The wings each feature a hipped roof of asphalt tiles. Both wings originally contained public bathrooms, with east wing containing a police sub-station for the United States Park Police, and the west wing housing first aid stations. Much of this space has since been converted into visitor facilities, with bathrooms still present in the east wing.

At the core of the bathhouse between the four buildings is the central courtyard. Now open space, the courtyard was initially used for dressing rooms, built with numerous cabana-shaped lockers, along with shower facilities. The western courtyard was for women, while the eastern court was for men. There were 500 changing rooms, containing 8,100 individual lockers. Of these, 5,400 lockers were located in the men's section, while the women's quarters held 2,700. The capacity was later increased to 10,000 during the 1936–1937 expansion, with 6,000 men's lockers and 4,000 women's lockers. The changing rooms were constructed of asbestos board, while the showers were tile with stone trim. The changing rooms were closed and removed by 1988 due to a lack of maintenance and sanitary concerns. Entrance to the changing rooms was via doors at the sides of the front and rear arcades.

Among the other original features of the bathhouse were two restaurants, a cafeteria, concession stands, and the solarium on the roof. These were later replaced by a ranger station, the park police station, and the first-aid station. An eastern portion of the beach pavilion is currently used to house lifeguards from the National Park Service. The bathhouse has received damage from numerous storms, including Hurricane Irene and Hurricane Sandy. Although a $20 million restoration of the bathhouse was started in the 1990s, the renovation project was only partially completed.

==== Central Mall ====
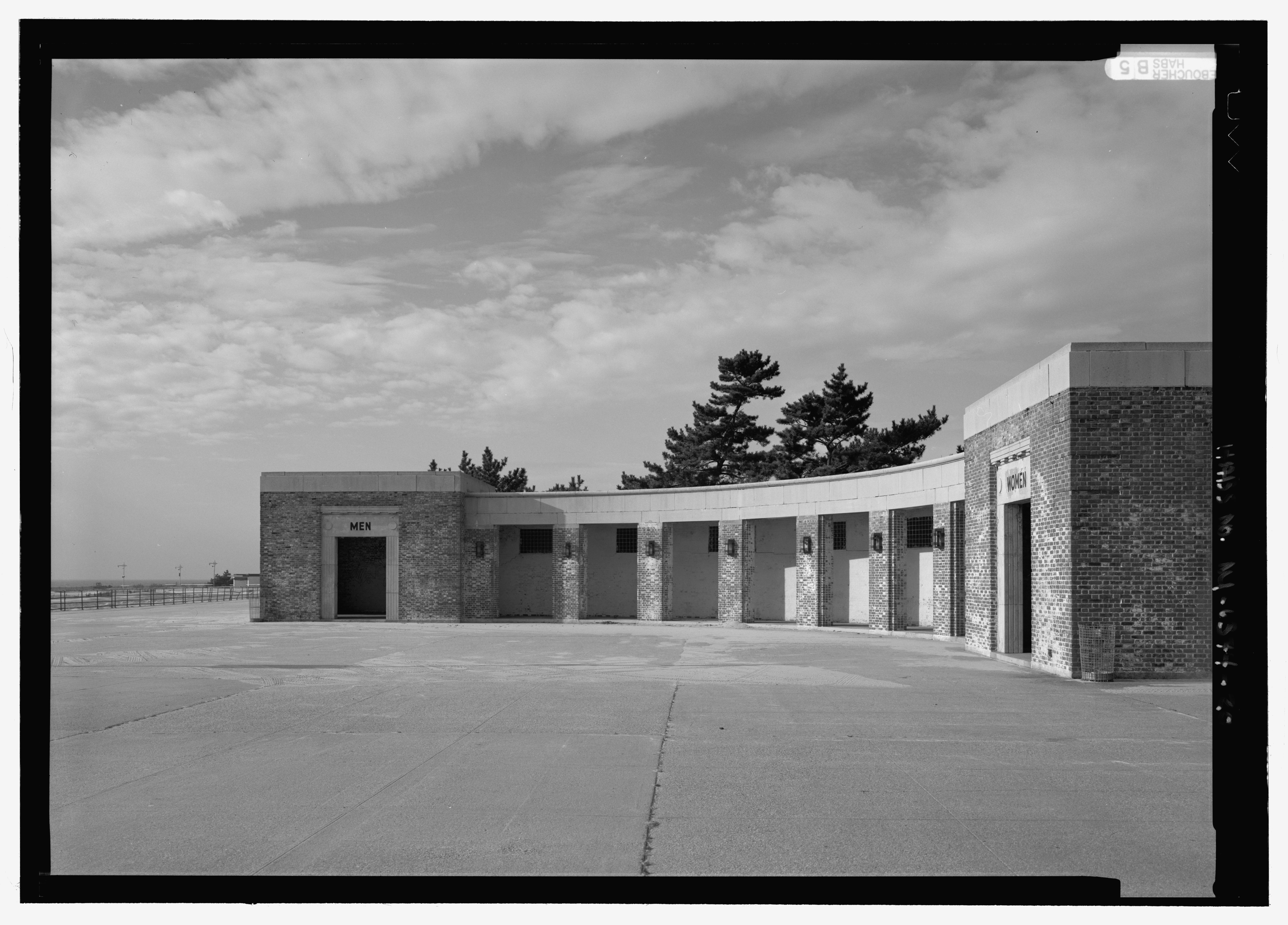
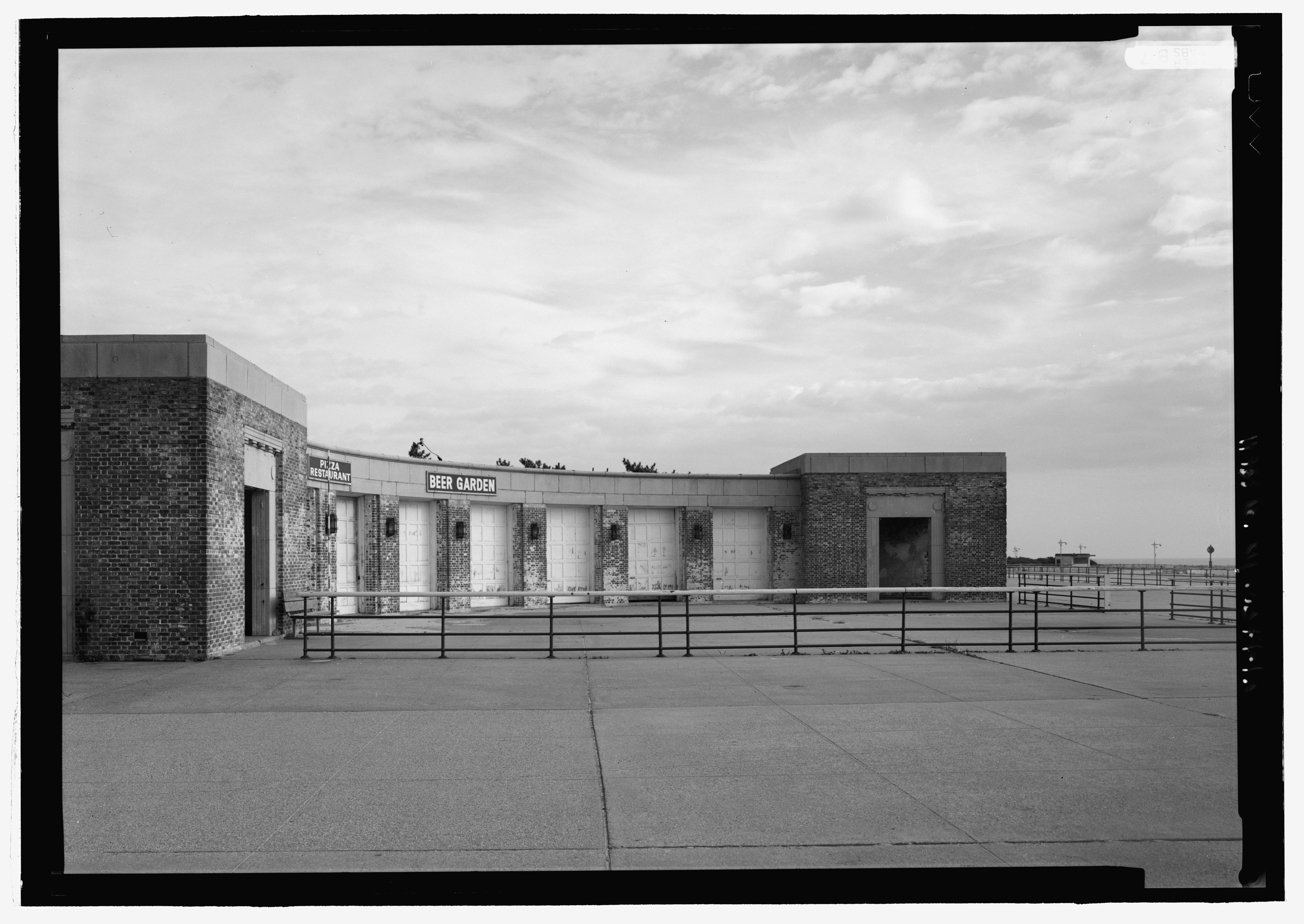
The western (left) and eastern mall buildings at the end of the central mall

Near the foot of the Marine Parkway Bridge between the parking lot and golf course (see § Additional features) is the park's central mall, a landscaped concourse which runs north-to-south between Beach Channel Drive and the main beach. The mall was laid out to be aligned with the Empire State Building, providing a distant view of the Manhattan skyscraper. At the south end of the mall is a concrete plaza with two structures known as the Central Mall Buildings or the Bay 9 Mall Buildings. The buildings were erected during the 1936–1937 park projects, designed in Art Deco/Art Moderne style. The outer facade consists of brick and tile with concrete trim and roofing. The two buildings are mirror images of each other, standing one-story high. They are semi-circle shaped, opening towards the main beach; the two buildings together form a horseshoe. Each structure occupies 6,000 square feet (560 m^{2}) of space. The western building contains offices and public toilets, along with a small bathhouse. The eastern structure is used as a concession stand, with retail space at its eastern end, and a patio area in front of it. Like the bathhouse, the mall buildings were painted gray upon opening in 1937. A bandstand was originally located in between the two buildings in the center of the plaza, but was removed in 1954.

A bronze bust of Jacob Riis had been installed adjacent to the western mall building in 1940, donated by Riis' son Roger. The bust rested on a granite pedestal constructed by the Parks Department with money from the Triborough Bridge and Tunnel Authority, the highway agency also controlled by Robert Moses. After it was stolen in 1964, only its granite base remained. A replacement bronze bust was constructed by artist David Ostro, organized by students at the Immaculate Conception Catholic Academy in Jamaica Estates. The new bust was installed on April 17, 2010.

==== Boardwalk ====
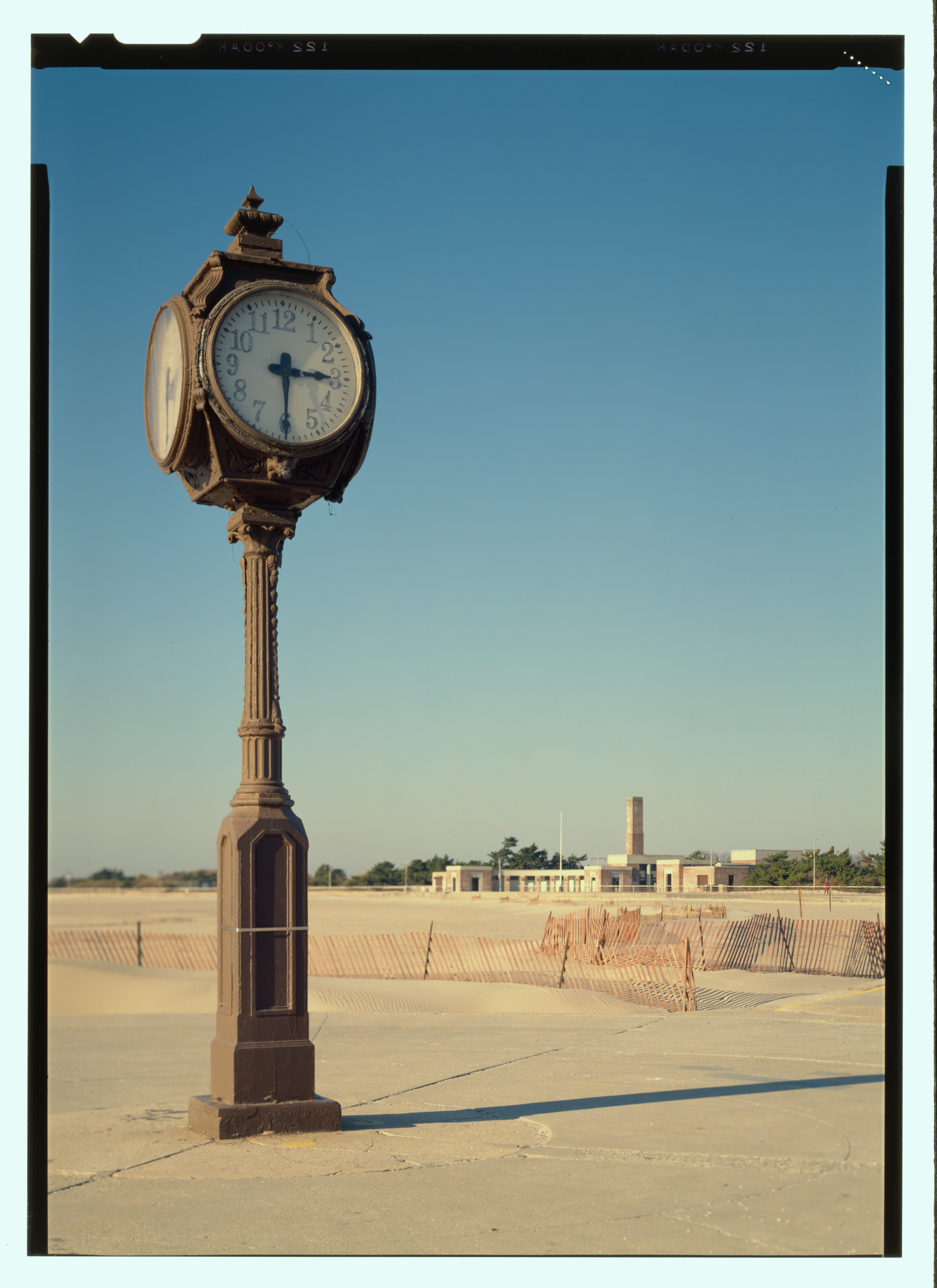
The Wise and Son clock on the Riis Park boardwalk

Running along the north end of the entire beach is the boardwalk, also sometimes called the promenade. The majority of the boardwalk was built during the 1936–1937 park projects, with the portion in front of the bathhouse built in 1932. The boardwalk separates the beach from the "back beach" portions of the park, such as the bathhouse, central mall, and non-beach recreation areas (see § Central Mall and § Additional features). It is the primary means of pedestrian circulation through the park. The boardwalk is 40 feet (12 m) wide, except at the bathhouse where it is 70 feet (21 m) wide. It was originally wood, but was upgraded to concrete in 1970.

The boardwalk is built on top of the beach's concrete seawall or bulkhead, which stabilizes the sand and protects the back beach from flooding. The original seawall was constructed in 1931 and ran parallel to the south face of the bathhouse. Portions of the old sea wall remain on the beach.

Located on the boardwalk at the east end of the main beach is a street clock, known as the Wise Clock or Riis Park Memorial Clock. It was donated by Downtown Brooklyn jewelry dealer William A. Wise and Son, after the store moved to a new location. The clock was built by the Howard Watch Company in 1891 and moved to the park on March 4, 1941. The clock has four faces, and originally operated on a single mechanism. Renovations in the 1970s added four individual mechanisms.

==== Parking lot ====
An aerial view of Riis Park and the Marine Parkway Bridge (background) in 1956

Located on the north side of Rockaway Beach Boulevard extending to Beach Channel Drive is the park's parking lot, which is variously given as being 62 acres (25 ha) or 72 acres (29 ha) in size. The parking lot is the largest individual feature in the park and occupies much of the park site north of the beach. The only entry point to the lot is at its south end in front of the bathhouse, where four toll booths are present. It was built with a capacity of either 9,000 or 14,000 automobiles. At the time of its construction, it was the largest paved parking lot in the world. A grade-level crosswalk to the west of the toll booths, and a pedestrian underpass to the east, lead across the street to the bathhouse. The lot is entirely circumscribed by the access roads to the park, with the roundabout located at its southeast corner, and the interchange with the Marine Park Bridge located near its northwest corner.

The parking lot was managed by the Marine Parkway Authority (which constructed and operated the Marine Parkway Bridge) until 1940, when it was merged with Robert Moses' Triborough Bridge and Tunnel Authority (TBTA). The TBTA operated the parking lot until 1968, when it in turn was merged with the Metropolitan Transportation Authority (MTA)'s Bridges and Tunnels division. In 1974, the entire park and its parking lot was relinquished to the National Park Service. Parking fees collected from Riis Park contributed to the construction of the bridge.

==== Additional features ====
At the west end of the park across from Fort Tilden is the park's 18-hole, pitch and putt golf course. It is 26 acres (11 ha) in size. The entrance to the course is from the boardwalk adjacent to the western mall building. The golf course was constructed during the 1936–1937 projects, and opened in 1938. A New York City Fire Department station and a Park Police station are located at the northwest corner of the golf course, on Beach 169th Street across from Fort Tilden. The fire house, Engine 329 and also called the Neponsit Fire Station, was constructed circa 1957 and opened in 1962. At the time it opened, it served the Neponsit, Roxbury and Breezy Point neighborhoods, as well as southern Brooklyn and Floyd Bennett Field. It replaced a local volunteer fire department when it opened. The ladder company of the fire house, Ladder 171, was closed on November 22, 1975 during the city's fiscal crisis.

At the southeast corner of the park just east of the bathhouse and adjacent to Neponsit is Neponsit Beach Hospital, a former children's tuberculosis hospital and later a nursing home. The hospital was built in 1915 on Riis Park property, and closed in September 1998. The New York Times wrote that, over the years, the portion of the beach in front of Neponsit Beach Hospital had evolved into "a queer haven". As of 2022, city officials planned to demolish the hospital.

The park also contains conventional park recreation including playgrounds and sports fields located in the back beach area. Little league-size baseball fields are located on the west side of the hospital at the east end of the park. Basketball courts are located at the west side of the bathhouse. Farther west near the central mall are handball, paddle ball, and shuffleboard courts. More basketball and handball courts were previously located along the southern edge of the golf course. There are also open grass areas for picnicking and grilling. One of these areas between the bathhouse and mall was previously a lighted softball field. The crescent-shaped plot of land east of the parking lot, 30 acres (12 ha) in size, is undeveloped and consists of open grass and trees. Baseball fields were formerly present on the southern portion of this site.

=== Beaches ===
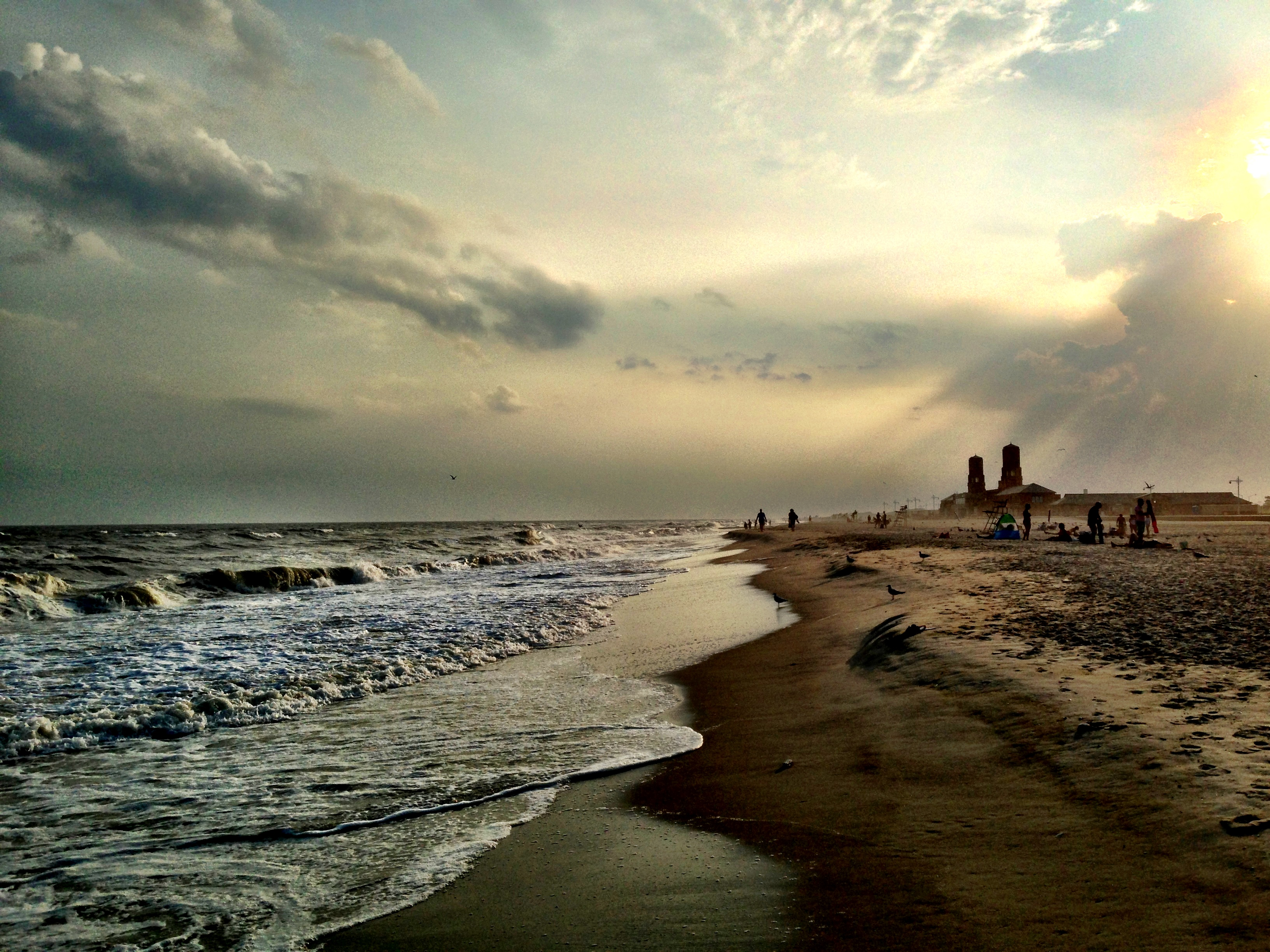
The beach and bathhouse at dusk at Jacob Riis Park

The beaches at Jacob Riis Park consists of 14 bays numbered east-to-west on the Atlantic coast. The main beach occupies the western half of the park, or Bays 6 through 14, at the mouth of the Central Mall. Bays 1 through 5 lie on the eastern half in front of Neponsit Beach Hospital and the park bathhouse. Bay 1 is directly in front of the hospital, while the bathhouse feeds into Bay 4. The main beach features a distinctive crescent shape opening towards the Atlantic Ocean. The eastern half of the beach is much more narrow than the western half. Each bay is separated by reinforced concrete jetties, boulders, and rows of wooden pilings which extend into the ocean. The jetties also stabilize the sand of the beach. Until the 1950s, Bays 1 and 2 were part of the Neponsit Hospital property. Adjacent to the east of Bay 1 is Rockaway Beach, another public beach which stretches from Neponsit to Far Rockaway at the east end of the peninsula. A fence separates the two beaches.

Bay 1 is often considered the "adult" section of the beach. It has historically been popular among the gay community, as well as nudists. At Bay 1, there is an informal memorial on a chainlink fence for LGBTQ icon Ms. Colombia, who was known to frequent the beach and whose body was found in the ocean near Bay 1 on October 4, 2018. The remaining bays have also been informally segregated in the past.

== Transportation ==
=== Public transport ===
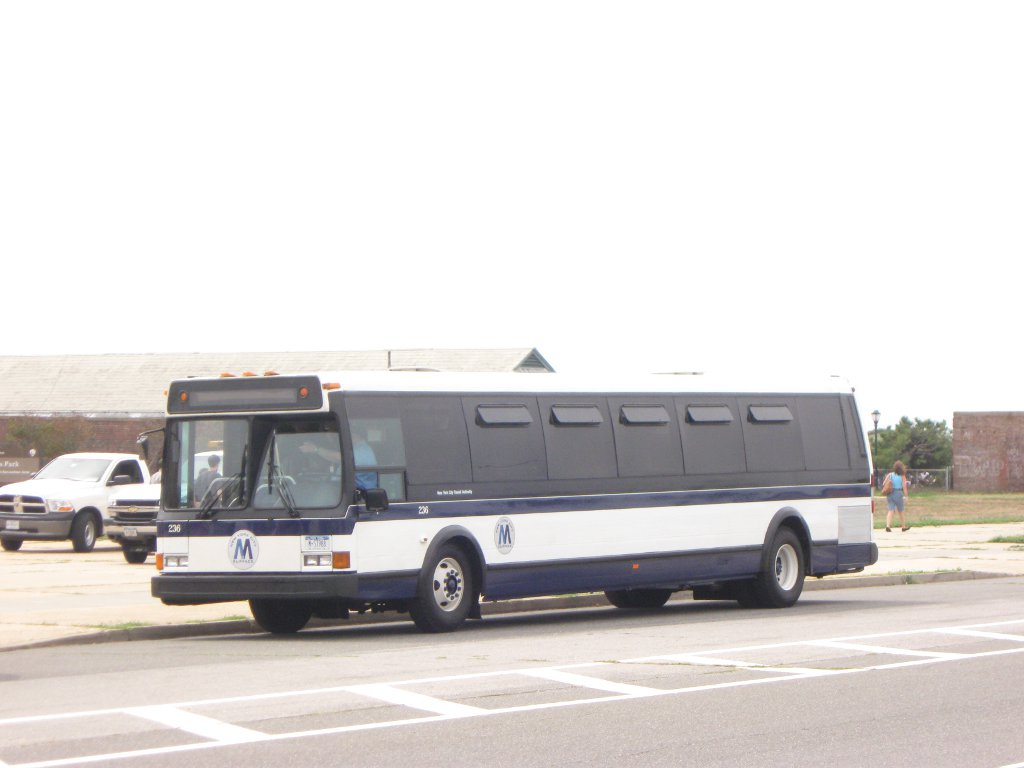
A retired Grumman 870 parked in front of Riis Park

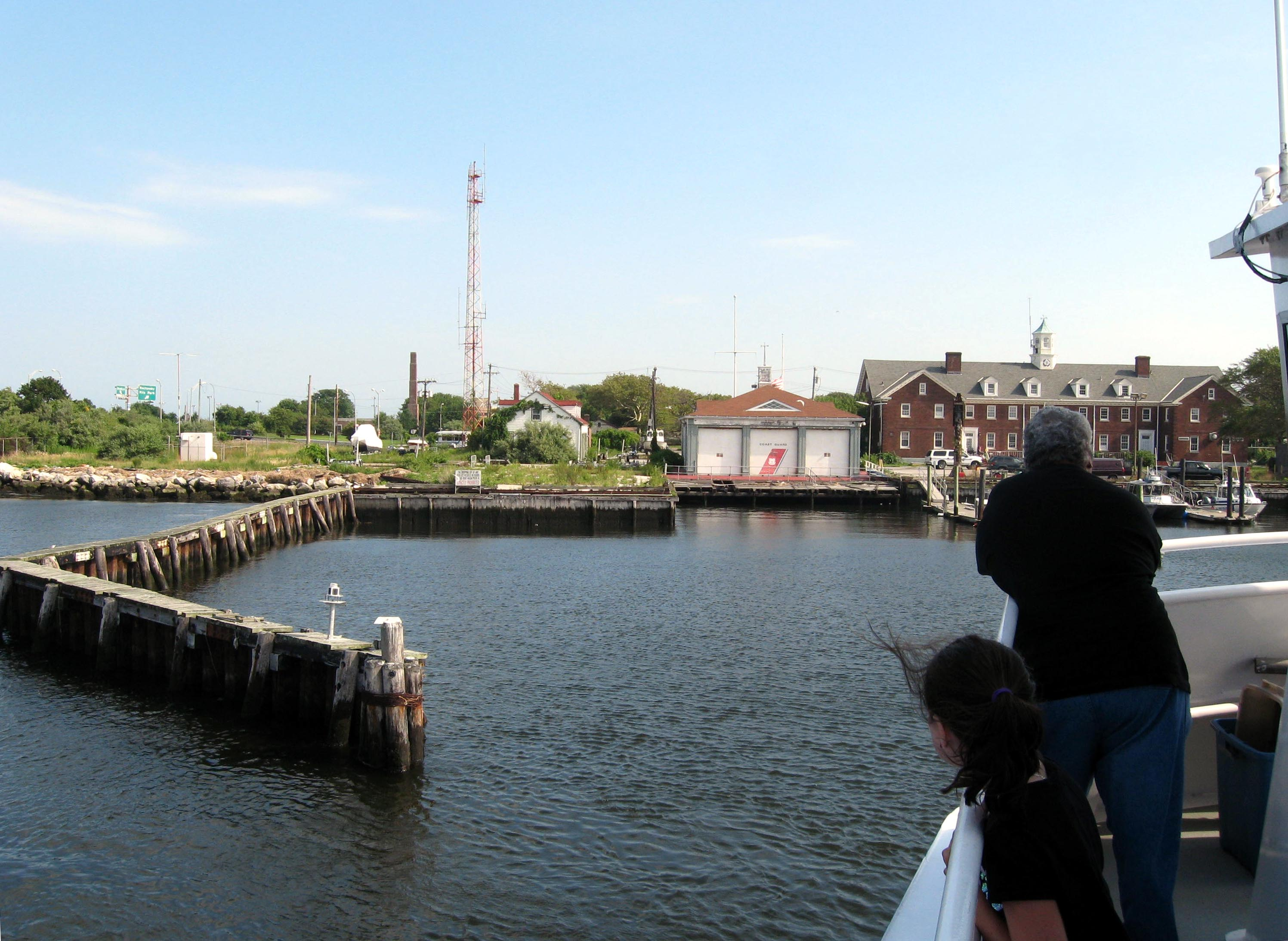
The Riis Landing ferry stop on the Jamaica Bay shore

The Q35 rush bus serve the park on Rockaway Beach Boulevard. The Q35 travels between Rockaway Park and Brooklyn via the Marine Parkway Bridge, making limited stops in Brooklyn and local stops in the Rockaways. During summer months (late May to early September) when the park is open, Q35 buses stop at the Riis Park bathhouse. This stop also acts as a drop-off area for passenger cars. Off-season, the closest stop to the park is at Beach 149th Street in front of Neponsit Hospital. An additional eastbound bus stop is located at the north end of the mall near the bridge. The QM16 express route to Manhattan also operates on Rockaway Beach Boulevard, terminating at the park bathhouse and parking lot. QM16 passengers utilize the parking lot as a park-and-ride facility.

The closest New York City Subway station is the Rockaway Park–Beach 116th Street station on the IND Rockaway Line east of the park, served by the A and S trains. The Q35 connects to the station, as well as to the Flatbush Avenue–Brooklyn College station in Brooklyn.

The New York Water Taxi operated a Rockaway ferry, also called the New York Beach Ferry, from Pier 11/Wall Street in Lower Manhattan, which stopped at Riis Landing in front of Fort Tilden on Jamaica Bay. Service began in May 2008. NYC Ferry also operates the Rockaway Ferry route from Pier 11/Wall Street to Beach 108th Street in Rockaway Park. A free shuttle bus travels from the ferry terminal, stopping at Beach 149th Street, the Riis Park bathhouse, and Beach 169th Street.

=== Road access ===
Highway access to Riis Park is provided by the Belt Parkway, which runs along the south shore of Brooklyn and Queens. The Belt Parkway connects to the Marine Parkway Bridge via its Flatbush Avenue exit in Marine Park, Brooklyn. Cross Bay Boulevard provides access from central Queens and Broad Channel, leading to both Beach Channel Drive and Rockaway Beach Boulevard. The Riis Park parking lot is a pay-to-park facility during summer months.

== In popular culture ==
The park was featured in a Cracker Jack commercial in the late 1960s and early 1970s, with the boardwalk and the Wise clock shown.
