= Ms. Colombia =

Colombian-American LGBTQ+ icon and performer

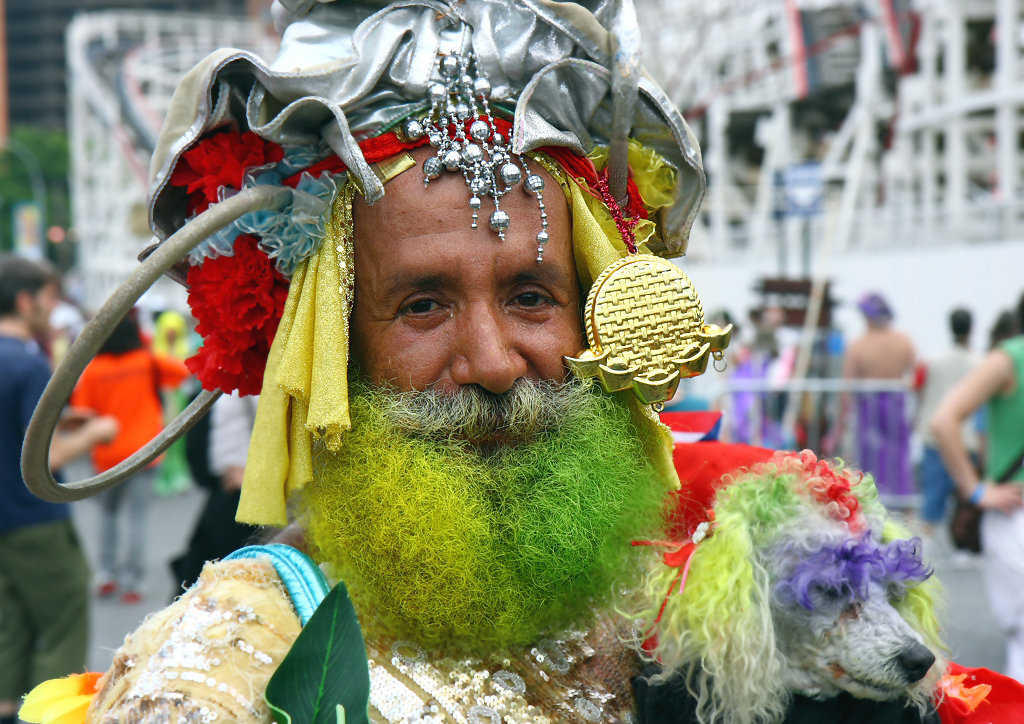
- Ms. Colombia in 2008
- Born: Oswaldo Gomez; 1954; Medellín, Colombia
- Died: October 4, 2018 (aged 63–64); New York City, United States
- Other names: La Paisa, Queen of Riis Park, Queen of Queens
- Years active: 1980s-2010s
- Known for: LGBTQ icon and Performer

Ms. Colombia (born Oswaldo Gomez; 1954 – 4 October 2018) was a Colombian-American LGBTQ icon and performer, known for her presence in the New York City community. Ms. Colombia entertained crowds at public events such as parades and in spaces such as Coney Island, Riis Beach and the Queens Pride Parade with her colorful outfits, dyed beard, and pets such as her poodle Cariño and parrot Rosita as well as with humor. Ms. Colombia became known under many nicknames, including La Paisa, Queen of Riis Park, and the Queen of Queens.

== Biography ==
=== Early years ===
Ms. Colombia was born Oswaldo Gomez in Medellín, Colombia. In Colombia, she trained as a lawyer.

=== Adult life ===
==== Immigration to the United States ====
Ms. Colombia immigrated to New York in 1975 out of a desire for freedom of expression and noted in the documentary series No Your City that "I decided to come to the United States for my own freedom, because by the time I left my country, nobody can dress like this — they’d kill you."

She lived in Elmhurst, Queens with a sister and worked selling arepas.

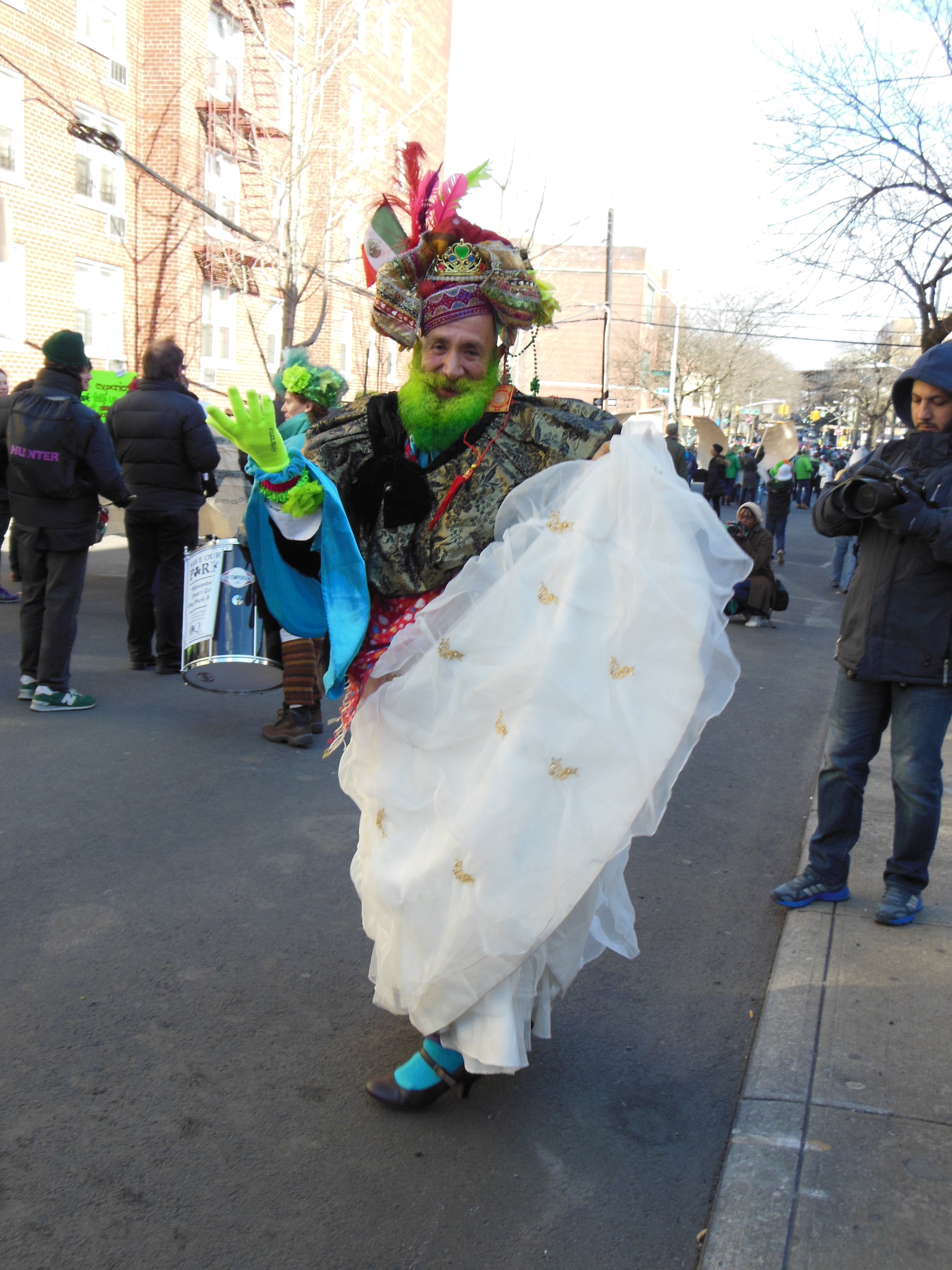
Ms Colombia at the 2013 St. Pat's for All Parade in Queens, NY.

==== AIDS diagnosis and development of Ms. Colombia personality ====
In 1988, soon after finishing her master's degree in Law from York University, Ms. Colombia was diagnosed with HIV and was told by a doctor that she had one year left to live. After receiving this prognosis, she started treatment and decided to live “day-by-day” and to embrace happiness by living carefree. She began to embrace her identity as Ms. Colombia. Her nickname originated from her "offering free legal services to fellow Colombian immigrants" in airports in her spare time.

==== Sexuality and gender identity ====
Ms. Colombia self-identified as gay while generally dismissing gender and sexuality labels. She was open to use of various pronouns to refer to her. Ms. Colombia was gender non-conforming and wore dresses and skirts and maintained a beard which was often dyed bright colors. Ms. Colombia was a member of the Colombian Lesbian and Gay Association.

==== Later years ====
In her later years, there were rumors that Ms. Colombia had died, approximately around 2015. Andrés Duque noted that Ms. Colombia seemed to have retired from public appearances in the types of dress for which she had become known.

=== Death ===
On October 4, 2018, Ms. Colombia's body was found in the Atlantic Ocean at Bay 1 of the People’s Beach at Jacob Riis Park, a known LGBTQ haven which Ms. Colombia frequented. Foul play was not suspected and it is suspected that Ms. Colombia drowned. Following her death, there was a celebration of Ms. Colombia's life in Jackson Heights that drew a large crowd. There is an informal, publicly maintained memorial dedicated to Ms. Colombia at Bay 1 of Jacob Riis Park on a chainlink fence. A close friend noted that Ms. Colombia wanted to be remembered, “As an artist who paints smiles on people’s faces.”

== Presence and performance ==
Ms. Colombia entertained crowds with her colorful outfits, beard, and pets as well as with humor. Ms. Colombia became known under many nicknames, including La Paisa, Queen of Riis Park, and the Queen of Queens.

Ms. Colombia's outfits at times recalled her Colombian heritage, featuring red, yellow, and blue (the country's flag colors) and wearing skirts that were similar to pollera traditionally worn by Colombian women.

Ms. Colombia made jokes and laughed even in the face of hostility and homophobia from crowds, but she was mostly loved and applauded. New York City politician Daniel Dromm described a story in which Ms. Colombia suggestively ate a banana to make the crowd laugh before a parade. Ms. Colombia "arbitrarily charged some onlookers $1 for his picture." She also told people that she was Lady Gaga's grandmother.

There is a collaborative Flickr album dedicated to Ms. Colombia at public events with contributions of 270 photos from over 70 photographers.

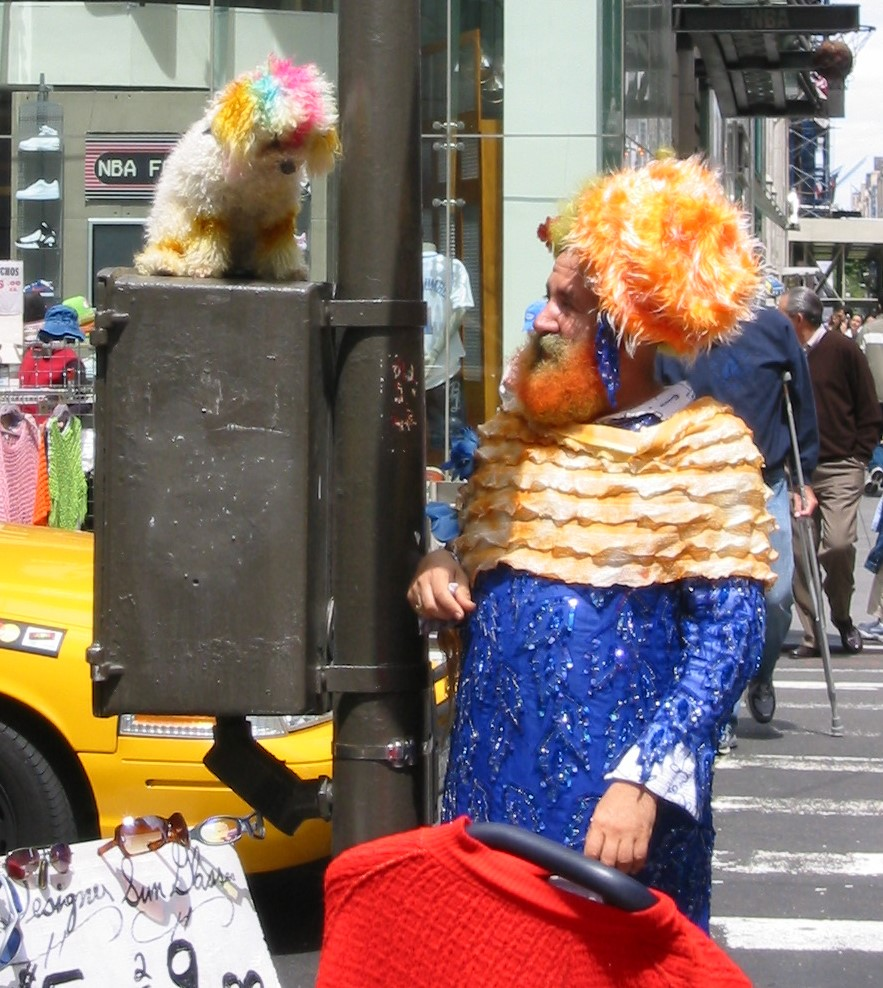
Ms. Colombia and her poodle Cariño, 2005

=== Pets ===
Ms. Colombia was known for having her pets by her side when out in public and they are featured in many photos alongside Ms. Colombia at events across New York City. Her pets Cariño and Rosita received first prize in the Pet Costume Contest at Coney Island's Deno’s Wonder Wheel Park first annual Pet Day.

==== Cariño the poodle ====
Cariño was a white poodle. Cariño's fur was frequently dyed various colors, often to match Ms. Colombia's beard. Cariño lived to at least 17 years old and died in May 2014.

==== Rosita the parrot ====
Rosita was an African Grey Parrot. Rosita frequently could be found riding on Ms. Colombia's head or shoulder or on Cariño the poodle's back.

== In popular culture ==
Ms Colombia was featured in an episode of the documentary series No Your City.

On August 23, 2024, a segment on NPR’s Morning Edition and StoryCorps podcast entitled "Remembering Ms. Colombia, An Icon Who Sparkled at NYC’s Riis Beach" interviewed two of Ms. Colombia's friends, Victoria Cruz and Carlos Villacres.
