= Rockaway Beach Boulevard =

Boulevard in Queens, New York

Coordinates: 40°35′1.25″N 73°49′17.36″W

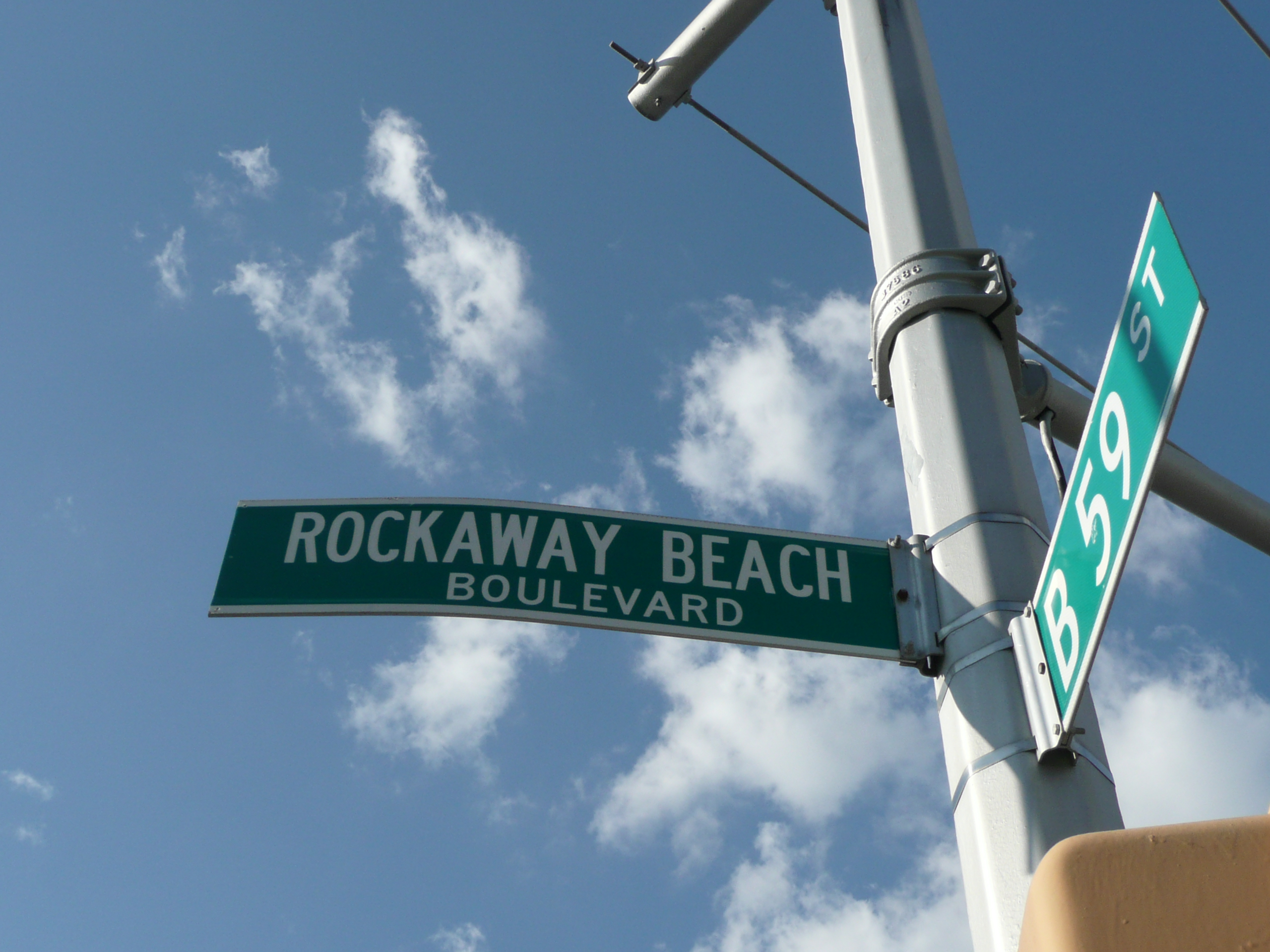
Rockaway Beach Boulevard

Rockaway Beach Boulevard, opened in 1886, was the first major east-west thoroughfare on the Rockaway Peninsula in the Borough of Queens in New York City. Much of its route parallels the Rockaway Freeway and the IND Rockaway Line above the Freeway. The boulevard first forks off at its eastern end from Beach Channel Drive at Beach 35th Street in Edgemere and merges once again with Beach Channel Drive by Jacob Riis Park shortly before the Marine Parkway–Gil Hodges Memorial Bridge.

The Boulevard runs north of the Freeway from its eastern end, while Edgemere Avenue runs exactly south of the Freeway, until Beach 56th Street in Arverne, where the northern flank becomes Arverne Boulevard and Edgemere Avenue abruptly turns into Rockaway Beach Boulevard for the remainder of its run.

While the Boulevard served as the heart of a bustling business and entertainment district in the heart of the Rockaway Beach neighborhood, which included numerous hotels and amusement attractions, including the famous Rockaways' Playland, it was found that its original width could barely cope with the expanding traffic in its heyday. Much of the area in Arverne served by Rockaway Beach Boulevard was leveled through abortive urban renewal efforts in the 1960s.

== Transportation ==
Rockaway Beach Boulevard is served by the following:

- The IND Rockaway Line parallels the boulevard east, between Beach 90th and Beach 116th Streets.
- The Q22 runs on the boulevard west of Beach 73rd Street, with Rockaway Park-bound service heading north on Beach 108th Street.
- The Q52 SBS and Q53 SBS run between Cross Bay Parkway and Beach 73rd and Beach 116th Streets, respectively. Woodside-bound Q53 service originates at Beach 108th Street.
- The QM16 express from Jacob Riis Park runs on the western portion of the Q22, while the QM17 express from Far Rockaway runs on the eastern portion. Both head to Midtown via Cross Bay Parkway.

== Sources ==
- Vincent Seyfried and William Asadorian, Old Rockaway, New York in Early Photographs, Dover Publications, Mineola, NY, 2000.
