= Marine Park (neighborhood), Brooklyn =

Neighborhood in New York City

Marine Park
- Neighborhood of Brooklyn
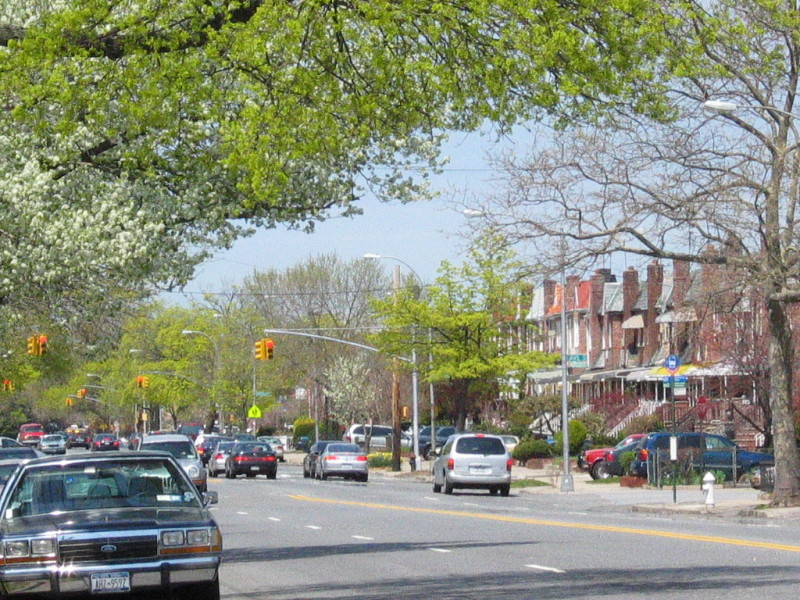
- Gerritsen Avenue, a major traffic corridor in the neighborhood
- Interactive map of Marine Park
- Coordinates: 40.598°N 73.920°W
- Country: United States
- State: New York
- City: New York City
- Borough: Brooklyn
- Community District: Brooklyn 18

Population (2010)
  - Total: 45,231
- Neighborhood tabulation area; includes Mill Basin, Bergen Beach, Marine Park, and Flatlands

Ethnicity
  - White: 73.8%
  - Black: 10.9
  - Hispanic: 7.9
  - Asian: 5.6
  - Other: 1.8
- ZIP Code: 11229, 11234
- Area codes: 718, 347, 929, and 917

Marine Park is a neighborhood in the New York City borough of Brooklyn. The neighborhood lies between Flatlands and Mill Basin to the east, and Gerritsen Beach, Midwood, and Sheepshead Bay to the south and west. It is mostly squared off in area by Gerritsen Avenue, Flatbush Avenue, Avenue U and Kings Highway. The neighborhood's eponymous park is the largest public park in Brooklyn. Charles Downing Lay won a silver medal in town planning at the 1936 Olympics for the planning of Marine Park.

Marine Park is largely inhabited by people of ethnic groups such as Italian Americans, Irish Americans, Greek Americans, and Jewish Americans. The area is part of Brooklyn Community Board 18.

== History ==
The neighborhood is situated around Gerritsen Creek, the westernmost inlet of Jamaica Bay; the creek's path within the neighborhood was covered in 1920. During the last 5,000 years, strips of sand were deposited by ocean currents. These beach strips form a surf-barrier and allow salt marshes to thrive:

...Gerritsen Creek was a freshwater stream that once extended about twice as far inland as it does today. Around 1920 the creek north of Avenue U was converted into an underground storm drain. Yet it continues to supply the salt marsh with fresh water, which helps the marsh support a wide range of organisms...

The area was a hunting and fishing ground for Native Americans from the nearby village of Keshawchqueren. Pits for cooking and preparing food dating from 800 to 1400 AD were uncovered in Marine Park, along with deer and turtle bones, oyster shells, and sturgeon scales. In the 17th century, the Dutch began to settle in the area, which had similarities to the marshland and coastal plains of the Netherlands. The land proved to be fairly good farmland and there was an abundance of clams, oysters, and game from the region as well.

...Fearing that the relatively pristine marshland around Gerritsen Creek would be destroyed, Frederick B. Pratt and Alfred T. White offered the city 150 acres (0.6 km^{2}) in the area for use as a park in 1917. After a seven-year delay the City accepted the offer. The prospect of a new park inspired developers to erect new homes in the area and, in the year 1926, form the organization, Marine Park Civic Association, although park improvements were slow to follow. Fill deposited in the marshlands in the 1930s and now land purchases increased the park's area to 1,822 acres (7 km^{2}) by 1937. That year the Board of Aldermen named the site Brooklyn Marine Park...

One of the oldest houses in the neighborhood is the Hendrick I. Lott House, built in 1720. The house is listed on the National Register of Historic Places and is a New York City designated landmark. In the 18th century, George Washington made a stop for several days on the land nearby. There was a gristmill on the water at the time.

As early as 1910, developers began dredging ports within Jamaica Bay in an effort to develop a seaport district there. Although the city allowed several piers to be constructed in 1918, only one was built on the former Barren Island. The pier, which was built in order to receive landfill for the other proposed piers, stretched 1 mile (1.6 km) northeast and was 700 feet (210 m) wide. In 1931, the city took possession of 58 acres (23 ha) on the western side of Barren Island. That plot was combined with a 110-acre (45 ha) tract owned by Kings County to create the park named Marine Park. Urban planner Robert Moses expanded Marine Park in 1935, and the city acquired 1,822 acres (737 ha) of land. This comprised the entire island west of Flatbush Avenue. Barren Island's residents were mostly evicted by 1939, and part of the island became part of Marine Park, but much of the rest of the island became Floyd Bennett Field.

In 1935, the mill burned down to the water level due to vandals, leaving only wood pilings across the water, which can be clearly seen to this day during low tide. In the mid-20th century the area was abused by trash and abandoned cars. At one point it became a landfill and trash piled up to 60 feet (18 m) in certain areas. After a massive cleanup effort in the 1990s the area was restored to its former glory, with exception of a few rusty car parts riddling the area, and teens littering and causing arson to the dry tall Phragmites from time to time.

== Demographics ==
Marine Park is located in zip code 11234, which also includes Mill Basin, Bergen Beach/Georgetown, and the southern portion of Flatlands. Based on data from the 2010 United States census, the combined population of Georgetown, Marine Park, Bergen Beach, and Mill Basin was 45,231, an increase of 2,291 (5.3%) from the 42,940 counted in 2000. Covering an area of 1,662.88 acres (672.94 ha), the neighborhood had a population density of 27.2 inhabitants per acre (17,400/sq mi; 6,700/km^{2}).

By the end of the 20th century, the majority of Marine Park residents were white, as were most residents of adjacent neighborhoods such as Mill Basin and Bergen Beach. By 2011, the number of black residents in Southeast Brooklyn had risen 241%, the steepest such increase of any area in the city. As of that year, the African American population in these neighborhoods represented 10.9% of the total population. As of the 2010 Census, the racial makeup of Southeast Brooklyn was 73.8% (33,399) White, 10.9% (4,952) African American, 0.1% (47) Native American, 5.6% (2,521) Asian, 0.0% (7) Pacific Islander, 0.3% (144) from other races, and 1.3% (578) from two or more races. Hispanic or Latino of any race were 7.9% (3,583) of the population. The 2020 census data from New York City Department of City Planning showed that the Marine Park/Mill Basin/Bergen Beach area has between 20,000 and 29,999 White residents and 5,000 to 9,999 Black residents, meanwhile the Hispanic and Asian populations each were less than 5000 residents.

== Education ==
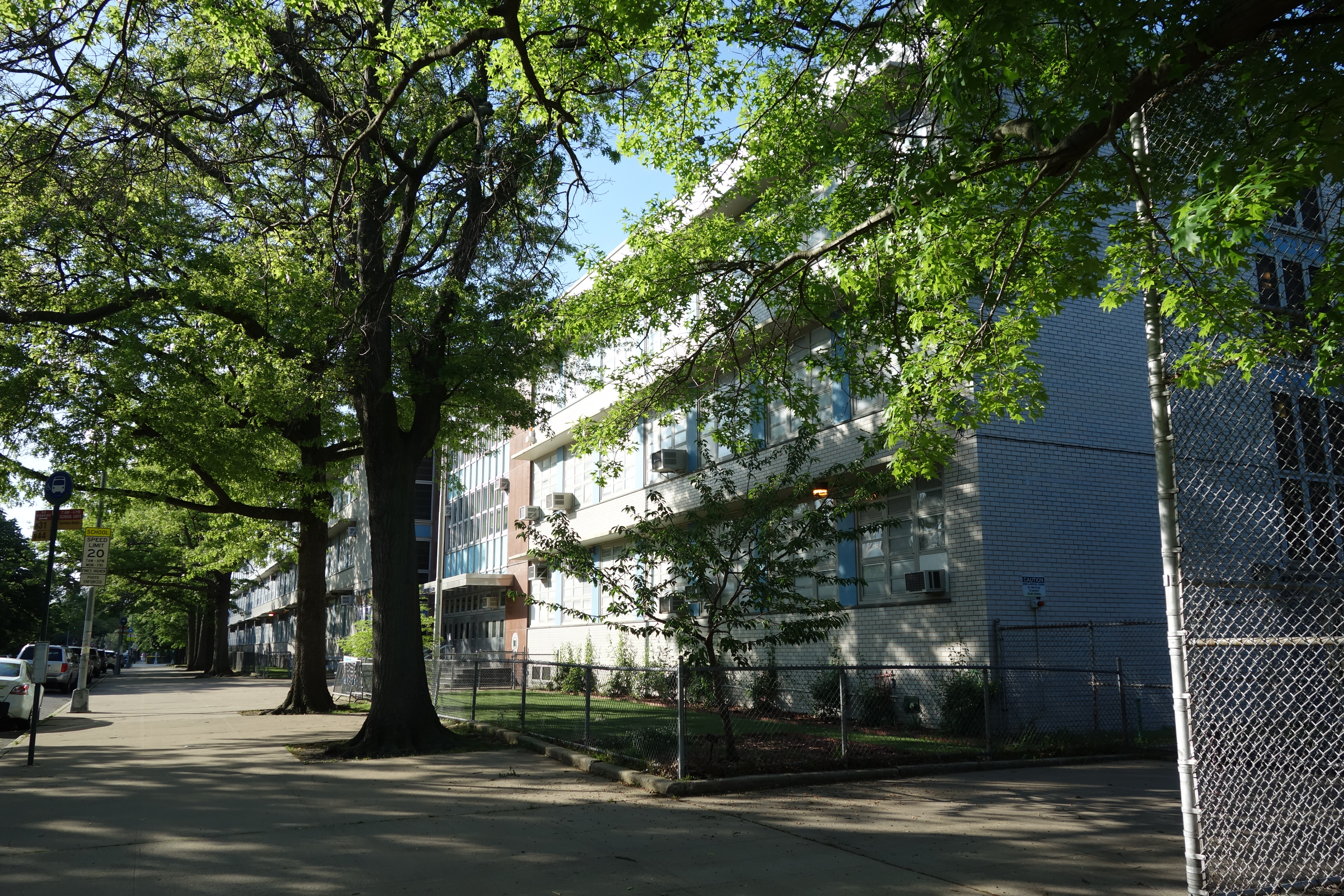
Marine Park Junior High School

Marine Park Junior High School is located in Marine Park. Comedian Chris Rock attended the school.

== Police and crime ==
Marine Park is patrolled by the New York City Police Department's 63rd Precinct. The precinct also covers Bergen Beach, Mill Basin, and part of Flatlands. The 63rd Precinct ranked 31st safest out of 69 patrol areas for per-capita crime in 2010.

The 63rd Precinct has a lower crime rate than in the 1990s, with crimes across all categories having decreased by 82.7% between 1990 and 2022. The precinct reported 1 murder, 10 rapes, 114 robberies, 170 felony assaults, 119 burglaries, 537 grand larcenies, and 135 grand larcenies auto in 2022.

== Transportation ==
Marine Park is served by the B2, B3, B9, B31, B41, B44, B44 SBS, B46, B46 SBS, B47, B100, BM4 and Q35 bus routes, operated by MTA Regional Bus Operations. There are no New York City Subway stations in the neighborhood; the closest is the Kings Highway station in Midwood. The closest highway available in the neighborhood is the Belt Parkway on the Flatbush Avenue exit.

== Park ==
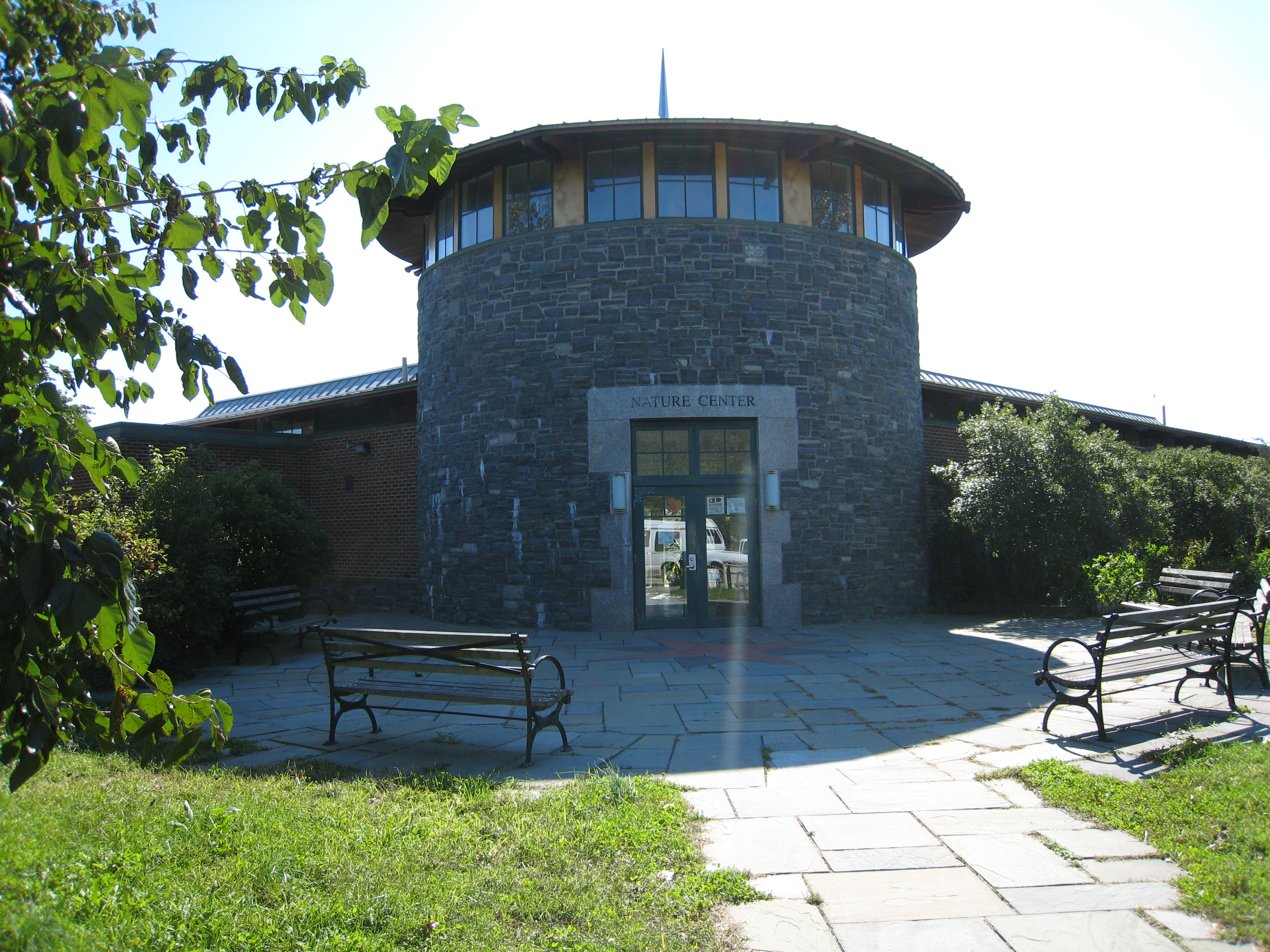
The park's Salt Marsh Nature Center

The neighborhood also contains a public park of the same name. The park's 530 acres (2.1 km^{2}) of grassland and salt marsh surround the westernmost inlet of Jamaica Bay. Most of the park's land was donated to New York City in the 1910s and 1920s, and consists of the area between the current day Fillmore Avenue and Gerritsen Avenue and East 38th Street. Originally almost 2,000 acres (810 ha), over half of which has been donated to the National Park Service as part of the Gateway National Recreation Area, the park is mainly a fertile salt marsh that is supplied with freshwater from Gerritsen Creek. Marine Park consists of recreational park areas and the Salt Marsh Nature Center. There is also a playground, several sports fields, and 0.83 mile-long running path, all of which were built on the ancient Keshawchqueren burial ground.

== Notable people ==
- Joel Benjamin (born 1964), chess Grandmaster.
- Frank "Curly" Lino (1938–2023), caporegime in the Bonanno crime family who later became an informant.
- Harvey Pitt (1945-2023), lawyer and SEC chairman
- Charlie Shrem (born 1989), entrepreneur and bitcoin advocate.
- Gil Student (born 1972), book editor of the Orthodox Union's Jewish Action magazine and former managing editor of OU Press.
- Joe Torre (born 1940), former Major League Baseball player and manager for the Atlanta Braves, St. Louis Cardinals, New York Mets, New York Yankees, and Los Angeles Dodgers, respectively, current baseball executive.
- Frank Torre (1931-2014), former Major League Baseball player for the Milwaukee Braves and Philadelphia Phillies, older brother of former New York Yankees manager Joe Torre.
- Terence Winter (born 1960), writer and producer of television and movies.
- Kenny Hickey (born 1966), guitarist for the gothic metal band Type O Negative

== Image gallery ==
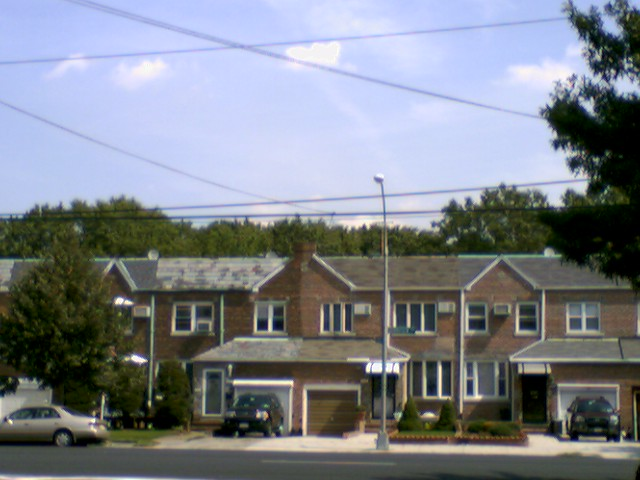
Brick row houses on Gerritsen Avenue

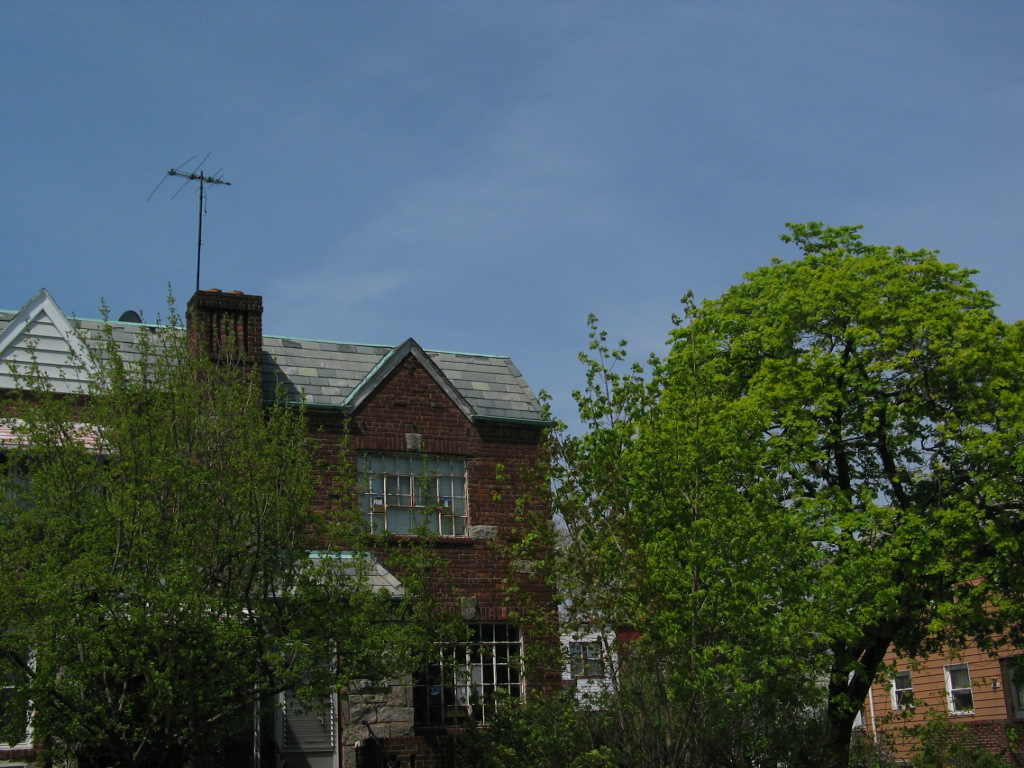
Old building

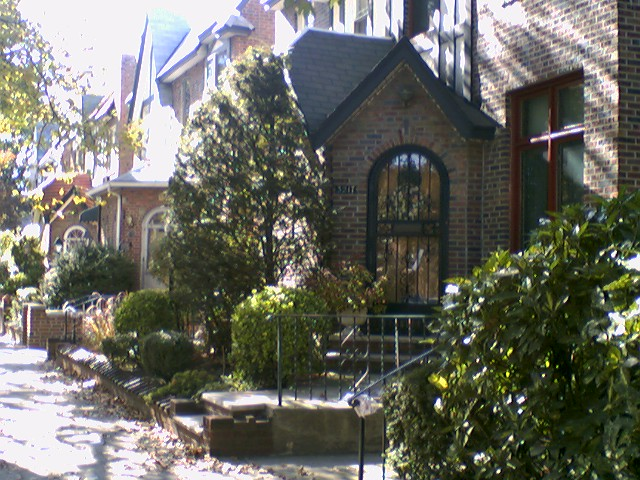
Porch on a row house

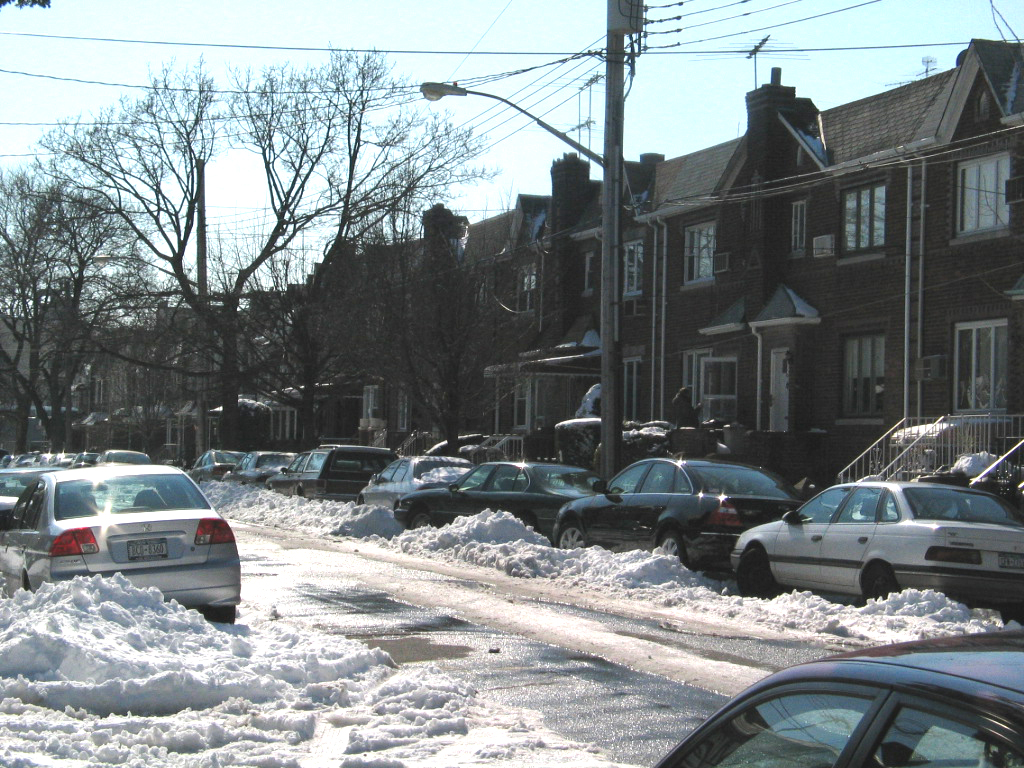
Row houses in winter

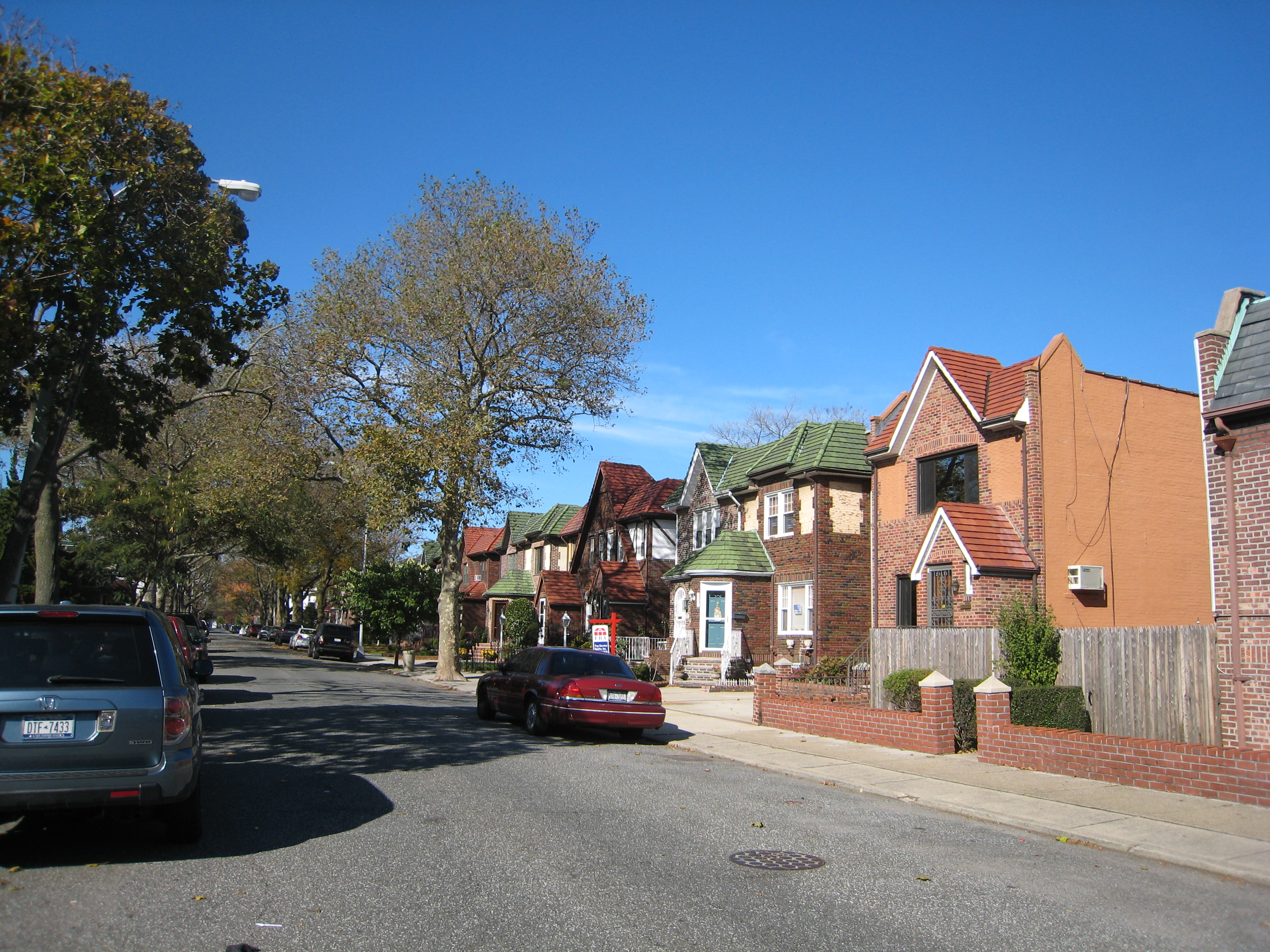
Row houses in fall

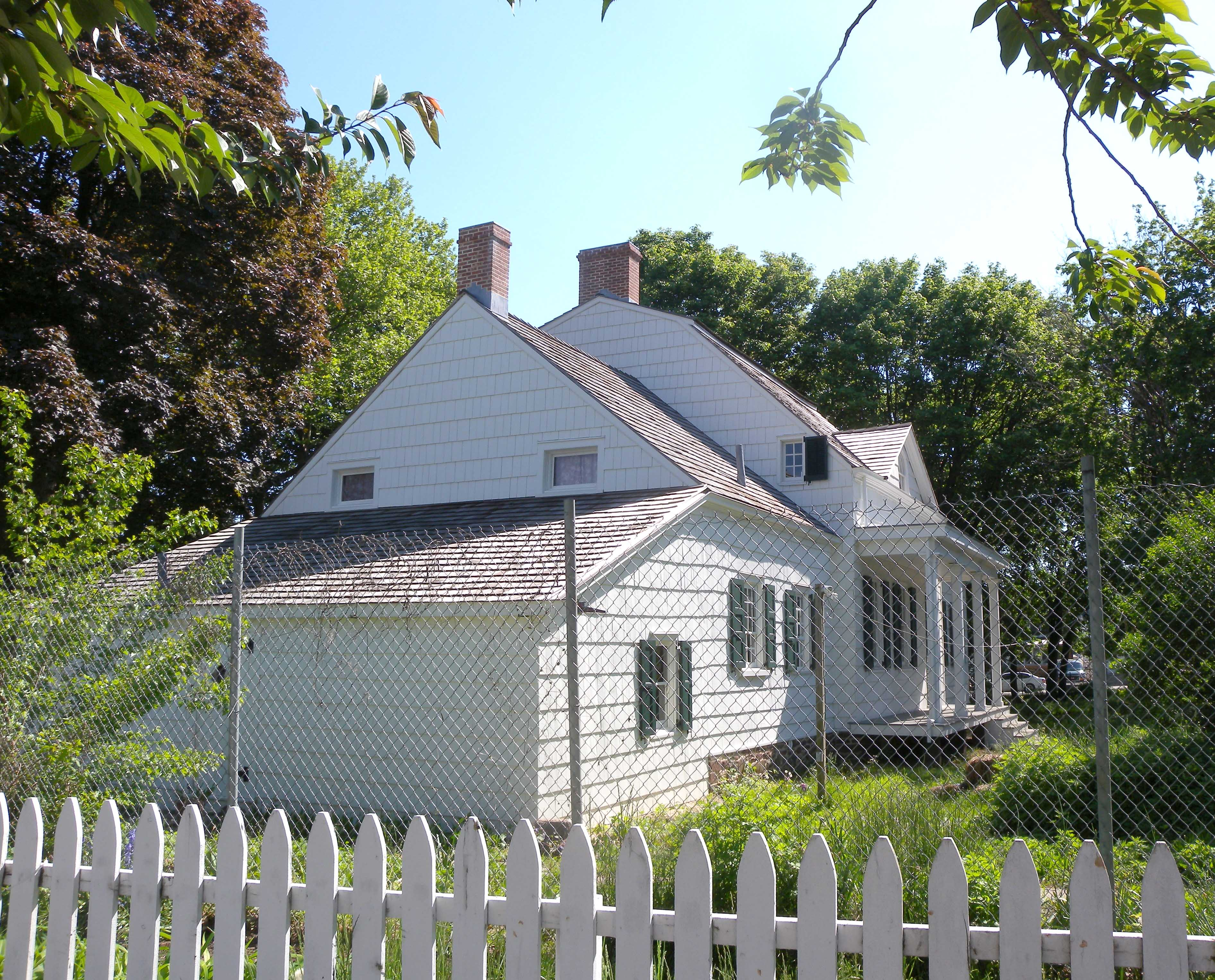
The Hendrick I. Lott House, in the neighborhood

== See also ==
- Gerritsen Creek
- Mau Mau Island
