= Vanderveer =

Vanderveer is a surname. Notable people with the surname include:

- Abraham Vanderveer (1781–1839), American politician
- Dylan Vanderveer (born 1997), American Division 1 College Golfer and Winner of the 2018 Mt. View City Championship
- Elizabeth Donner Vanderveer (born 1876, death unknown), professional name of screenwriter Beta Breuil
- Ellinor Vanderveer (1886–1976), American actress
- George Vanderveer (1875–1942), American labor lawyer
- Heidi VanDerveer (born 1964), American women's basketball coach
- John Rutgert Vanderveer (1821–1898), American physician
- Tara VanDerveer (born 1953), American women's basketball player and coach

== See also ==
- Jacobus Vanderveer House, historic house in Bedminster Township, New Jersey, United States
- Van der Veer (disambiguation)
- Vander Veer (disambiguation)
- VanDerVeer Genealogy Database
