= Gerritsen's Mill, Gravesend =

Tide mill in Brooklyn, New York

Coordinates: 40°35′29″N 73°55′36″W

Gerretsen's Mill is an 18th century tide mill, at Gravesend, Long Island, also known as Johannes Gerritsen's Mill and the Whitney mill, derived its name from a 1750s Dutch miller in the area of Marine park, Brooklyn. The mill was situated near what is now known as Garritson's Creek and Mill Pond, formerly referred to as the Strome Kil. The origin of the name can be traced back to historical references, including an Indian deed mentioning land belonging to Hugh Garretson, likely referring to the same location. The farm was parceled to Dutch settler Wolfert Gerritse van Couwenhoven (1 May 1579 – 1662), an original patentee, director of bouweries (farms), and a founder of the New Netherland colony. The three-hundred-year-old mill was destroyed by fire in 1935 by arson.

== Gerritsen Creek ==
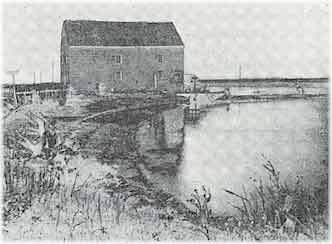
The Gerritsen Creek tidal mill in the 19th century

Gerritsen Creek is a short watercourse in Brooklyn, New York City, that empties into Jamaica Bay. The creek has been described as one of the "fingers" that formed the original shoreline of Jamaica Bay. The creek lies just beyond the maximum extent of the Wisconsin Glacier. It is listed as the earliest tide mill in North America. Constructed prior to 1756, the mill was erected on the footprint of an earlier structure and featured wooden machinery, leather beltings, and large rotating millstones. Positioned on the periphery of a basin, it bordered the area where the sea water flowed in upon the opening of the floodgate at the dam spanning the narrowest section of the creek. As the water rose to the crest of the dam, the gates closed, creating a reservoir behind them. A manual mechanism, operated by a ratchet wheel, controlled a gate in the sluiceway behind the mill, regulating the flow of water onto the mill wheel as needed. In recent times the creek has been a dumping ground for recreational boaters detrius.

The small salvage firm White Cap Marine Towing and Salvage, of Sheepshead Bay, specializes in rescuing or salvaging keeps the area clear and seaworthy. It has a contract to keep the area clear of abandoned vessels.

== Genealogy ==
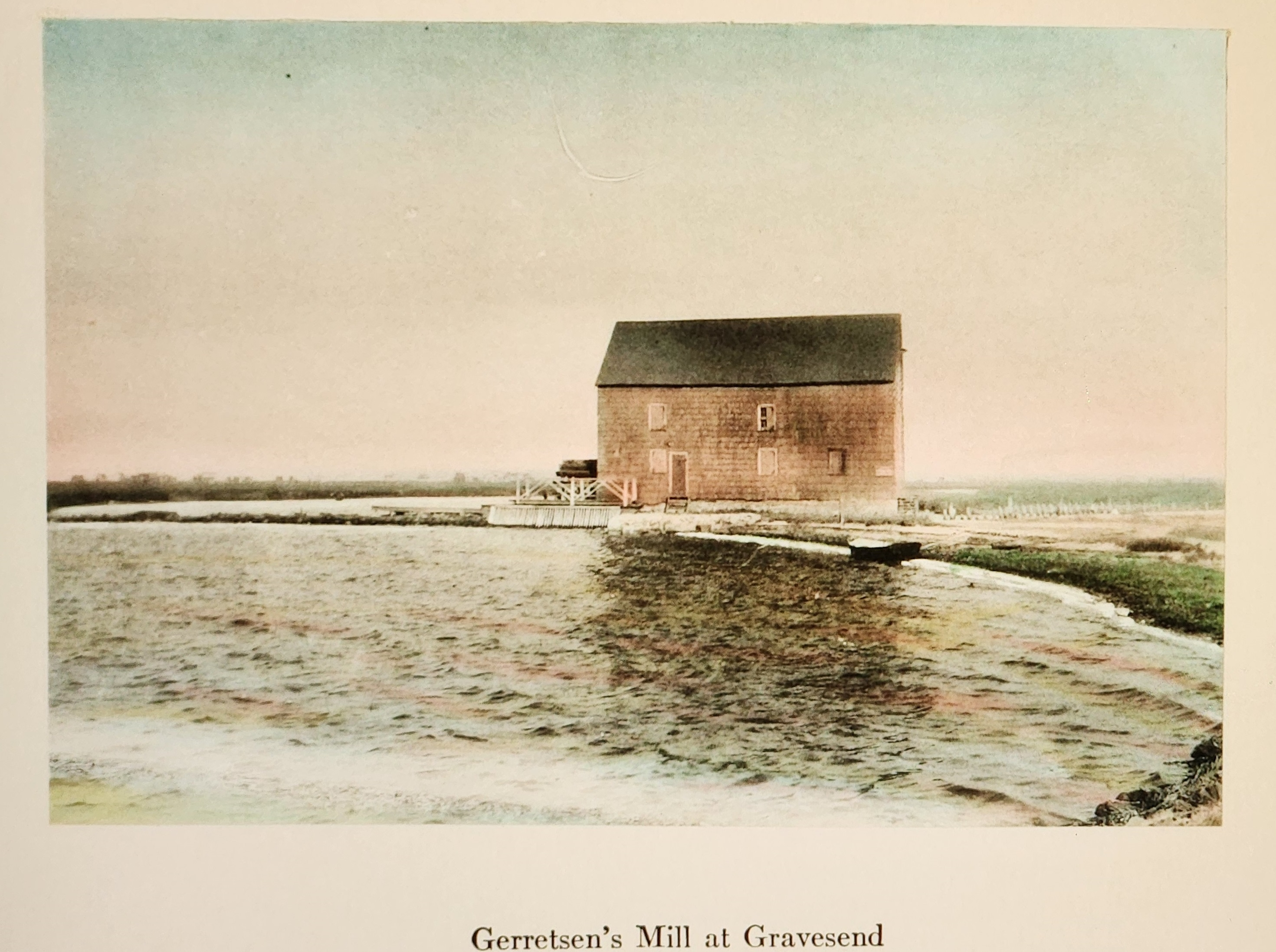
First tide-mill in North America

Johannes Gerritsen, identified as a miller of Gravesend, is documented in historical records, including his will dated December 20, 1765, found in the New York Surrogate's office. In his will, he bequeathed his estate to his son, Samuel Gerritsen, along with specific legacies to be paid. Johannes Gerritsen's lineage can be linked to Samuel Geretsen, as noted by Tunis G. Bergen in "Early Settlers of Kings County." It is inferred that Johannes Gerritsen was likely a son of Samuel Geretsen, born sometime after 1700.

The tradition of naming children after grandparents, common among Dutch families, is evident in the Gerritsen family, further supporting the connection between Johannes and Samuel Geretsen. Subsequent records, such as the will of Samuel Garritsen probated in 1822, continue to document the family's ownership and involvement in the mill's operation and land ownership in Gravesend. The mill's lineage continues through subsequent generations, as evidenced by the will of Samuel Garritsen, of Gravesend, recorded in Liber 2 of the Kings County Surrogate's office and probated in 1822. In his will, Samuel bequeaths hisgrist mill and farm to his son, John S., while also naming his daughters, Jane and Elizabeth. He appoints his son-in-law, John Lott, and his grandson, Van Brunt Magaw, as executors.

Historians place the original mill at that spot around 1645, it was once considered one of the oldest standing buildings in New York. Legend holds that the predecessor mill stood since before 1645, a notion reinforced by an Indian deed referencing Barren Island across the bay. The deed describes the island as surrounded by the vast ocean, with its westernmost point branching into a river flowing northward toward the land owned by Hugh Garretson. This river is presumed to be the same creek where the mill is situated.

Van Brunt Magaw, born September 7, 1783, and died March 18, 1831, was the son of Colonel Robert Magaw, a distinguished Revolutionary War officer, and Marritje, daughter of Colonel Rutgert Van Brunt. Van Brunt Magaw married Adriana, daughter of Louwrens Voorhees and Jannetie, daughter of Samuel Garritson, on November 2, 1811.

Elizabeth Garritsen married John Lott, the second son of and Catharine Vanderbilt. They resided on the farm purchased by Judge Lott from the heirs of Philip Nagel, which he later bequeathed to John Lott upon his death. Their son, Samuel G. Lott, was the father of Theodore Lott.

The lineage of the mill's ownership further unfolds with the probate of John S. Gerretson's will on September 2, 1864, recorded in Liber 28. John S. Gerretson, identified as a miller of Gravesend, leaves his farm, meadows, and mill to his son, Samuel J. Gerretsen, and another farm acquired from the Stillwells to his son, Simon C. Gerretsen.

Samuel J. Gerretsen's will, recorded on October 31, 1876, and made on May 4 of the same year, reveals the continuation of the family's legacy. He bequeaths all his property, both real and personal, to his two daughters, Mary C., widow of Abraham Ditmas Polhemus, and Helen B., wife of Stephen H. Herriman, both residing in Brooklyn.

The genealogical record of the family provides insight into Samuel J. Gerretsen's marriage to Jane, daughter of Jacob Van Brunt and Esther Vanderbilt, born May 14, 1803, and died November 20th, 1861. Their children include Mary C., born July 7, 1822, who married Abraham D. Polhemus in 1846, and Helen B., born November 15, 1824, who married Stephen H. Herriman on April 25, 1853.

The ownership of the property underwent further changes over the years. On December 20, 1864, Samuel J. Gerretsen transferred a portion of the property to his son-in-law, Abraham Ditmas Polhemus. Subsequently, on November 14, 1879, the executors of Abraham D. Polhemus's will sold the premises he had acquired to Helen V. B. Herriman. Following the passing of Stephen H. Herriman, who inherited his wife's interest in the property, it was bequeathed to his three children: William S. Herriman, Maria Bell Hazen, and Helen Herriman. Upon William S. Herriman's demise, he left his share of the Gravesend property to his sister, Maria Bell Hazen.

== 1900s ==
In 1899, Mrs. Hazen and Miss Herriman sold the estate to the Honorable William C. Whitney. Under his ownership, the property underwent extensive renovations, reconstruction, and landscaping, transforming it into one of the most remarkable country estates in the vicinity of New York. Upon William C. Whitney's passing, his son, Harry Payne Whitney, inherited the property and assumed ownership.

Until the early twentieth century, the area remained undeveloped except for a few squatters’ bungalows clustered at the foot of Gerritsen Avenue. The mill remained in use for hundreds of years, until 1890. There were early proponents of preserving heritage buildings who lobbied for its preservation. Mayor Jimmy "Beau James" Walker was brought to the site to view the structure. However, no efforts were made, and the abandoned building was burned by an arsonist in 1935.

== See also ==
List of tide mills on Long Island
