= Tide mill (disambiguation) =

A tide mill or tidal mill is a type of watermill which relies on tidal power, the rise and fall of the tides.

Tide Mill or similar may also refer to:

- Tidemill, Gloucester County, Virginia, an unincorporated community in Gloucester County, Virginia, USA
- Tide Mills, East Sussex, England, UK; a derelict village

== See also ==
- List of watermills in the United Kingdom
- List of tide mills on Long Island
- Mill (disambiguation)
