= List of tide mills on Long Island =

Type of watermill

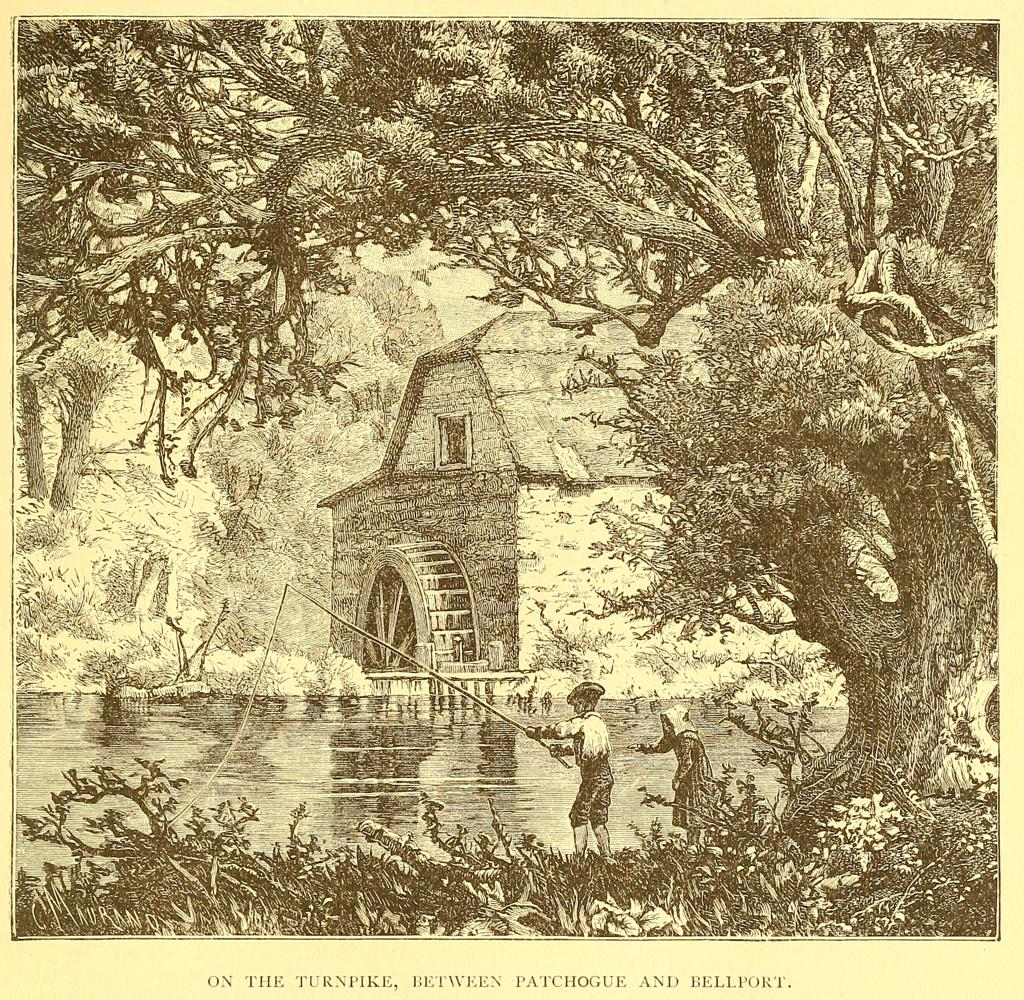
Swan River Mill, Patchogue

This list of Long Islands watermills comprises a selection of European watermills spanning the period from the Dutch colony of Neiuw Amsterdam to the English settlement of the North fork, from 1640 to 1900 AD.

A tide mill is a water mill driven by tidal rise and fall. A dam with a sluice is created across a suitable tidal inlet, or a section of river estuary is made into a reservoir. As the tide comes in, it enters the mill pond through a one-way gate, and this gate closes automatically when the tide begins to fall. When the tide is low enough, the stored water can be released to turn a water wheel.

Tide mills are usually situated in river estuaries, away from the effects of waves but close enough to the sea to have a reasonable tidal range. Cultures that built such mills have existed since the Middle Ages, and some may date back to the Roman period.

== Brooklyn ==
Location	Name of mill and coordinates	Type	Built	Notes	Photograph
Gowanus	Brouwer's Mill (before 1661), Freeke's Mill (Late 18th century)	Millpond	pre-1661	Adam Brouwer (Original proprietor), John C. Freeke (Late 18th century), Jan Evertse Bout (Land owner), Isaac Deforest (Business partner).	Freeke's Mills with Yellow Mills in the Distance, burnt on the 27th of Aug. 1776 while the Americans were retreating across Gowanus Creek (NYPL b12610187-423823)
Gowanus	Yellow Mill (1709, also known as Denton's Mill)	Millpond	1709	Nicholas and Adam Bruwer Jr.	Map of the 3rd ward
Red Hook	Van Cortlandt's Mill/Van Dyke's Mill (pre-1689)	Millpond	pre-1689	Stephanus Van Cortlandt (until 1700), Matthias Van Dyke (from 1712), John Van Dyke (from 1736), Nicholas Van Dyke and Matthias Van Dyke (from 1784)	
Marine Park	Gerritsen's Mill (late 19th century)	Millpond	Late 19th century	–	
Long Island City	Van Cortlandt's Mill/Van Dyke's Mill (pre-1689)	Millpond	pre-1689	Stephanus Van Cortlandt (until 1700), Matthias Van Dyke (from 1712), John Van Dyke (from 1736), Nicholas Van Dyke and Matthias Van Dyke (from 1784)	
Greenpoint	Abraham Jansen's Mill (1664), Masters’ Mill (until 1890), Schenck's Mill	Watermill, Millpond	1664 (Abraham Jansen's Mill), until 1890 (Masters’ Mill)	Abraham Jansen (1664), – (Masters’ Mill), – (Schenck's Mill)	
Kanapaukah Kil Dutch Kills	Brutnell-Wandell Plantation	Plantation	1643 (Richard Brutnell), later owned by William Herrick and Thomas Wandell	Richard Brutnell's plantation, deeded to him in 1643, later came into the possession of William Herrick. Herrick's widow married Thomas Wandell, who was living on the Bushwick shore of Newtown Creek as far back as 1648. Wandell enlarged the property by purchase, and it became later known as the Alsop farm.	
Sunnyside	Broucard Burgon's Gristmill (1688), Isaac Bragaw's House (1757)	Gristmill, House	1688 (Broucard Burgon's Gristmill), 1757 (Isaac Bragaw's House)	Broucard Burgon, Isaac Bragaw	
Hallett's Cove	Hendrick Rycken's Sawmill	Sawmill	–	Hendrick Rycken	
Sackhigneyah Stream	Cornelius Luyster's Gristmill	Gristmill	–	Cornelius Luyster	
Fishpoint	Thomas B. Jackson's Gristmill	Gristmill	–	Thomas B. Jackson	
Williamsburgh Region	Tide Mills	Millpond	–	–	
Flatbush	Tide Mills, Windmill	Millpond, Windmill	–	–	
Gravesend	Gerritsen's Mill, Gravesend	Millpond	1659 (1659 Mill), 1810 (Tide Mills)	Johannes Gerritsen, Samuel J. Gerretsen, Harry Payne Whitney	first tide-mill in North America

== Queens / Nassau ==
North – South going East (Note: Prior to 1899 Queens extended to Hempstead Village in North Hempstead.)

Location	Name of mill and coordinates	Type	Built	Notes	Photograph
Dutch Kills	Jorrisen's Mill (1650)	Kill	1650–1657	Burger Jorrisen (Original proprietor), Bragaw, Parcell, Polhemus and Ryerson (Late 18th century), Payntar family (1831–61). The first ancient road in Maspeth was an Indian pathway used by Dutch colonists, running from Burger Jorrissen's tide mill to the East River's Ferry House. In 1642, English settlers extended it to their Newtown Creek settlement, naming it Ferry Road. Today, parts of 57th Avenue (formerly Creek Street and Old Flushing Avenue) cover this path.	Dutch Kills eastern millstone jeh
Astoria, New York	Jackson Grist Mill	Gristmill	(Exact date unknown), between 1810 and 1870	The Jackson Grist Mill, located at Old Bowery road, in Bowery Bay at present day LaGuardia Airport in Astoria, New York, United States,	Bowery Bay seen in 1989, with the wreckage of USAir Flight 5050 in the foreground.
Canarsie, New York	Vanderveer	Gristmill	(Exact date unknown), between 1810 and 1870	The Vanderveer Grist Mill, located at Vanderveer Creek, New York, United States,	Vanderveer Grist Mill
Flushing, New York	Flushing River	Gristmill	(Exact date unknown), between 1810 and 1870	The Bush Lumber & Coal Grist Mill, located at present day Flushing, New York, United States,	Grist Mill
Elmhurst, New York	Lott	Sawmill	(Exact date unknown), between 1810 and 1870	The Lott Saw Mill of Newtown, located at present day Elmhurst, New York, United States,	Crop of Higgingson map of Kings and Queens showing mills along Mill River in Hempstead
Newtown, New York	Carll	Gristmill	(Exact date unknown), between 1810 and 1870	The Carll Grist Mill, located at Newtown, present day Elmhurst, New York, United States,	Jesse Carll Shipyard by Edward Lange (1882).
Jamaica, New York	Remsen	Gristmill	(Exact date unknown), between 1810 and 1870	The Jackson Grist Mill, located at Merrick Rd/Sayres Av in present day St. Albans, New York, United States,	Remsen family is buried in Prospect Cemetery
Rosedale, New York	Duryea's Creek	Gristmill	(Exact date unknown), between 1810 and 1870	The Duryea's Creek Grist Mill, located at present day JFK Airport in Rosedale, New York, United States,	Duryea's Creek Grist Mill
Douglaston, New York	Lawrence	Gristmill	(Exact date unknown), between 1810 and 1870	The Alley Pond Grist Mill, located at present day Douglaston, New York, United States,	Alley Pond Grist Mill
Cambria Heights, New York	Neils	Sawmill	(Exact date unknown), between 1810 and 1870	The Hook Creek Saw Mill, located on Hook Creek at present day Cambria Heights/Laurelton, New York, United States,	Hook Creek Saw Mill
Laurelton, New York	Springfield Reservoir	Gristmill	(Exact date unknown), between 1810 and 1870	Powells Grist Mill, Located on Hook Creek at present day Laurelton, New York, United States, On Simonson's creek.	Simonson Creek, Idlewild Park, Brookville Boulevard, Brookville, Queens.
Springfield Gardens, New York	Baisley Pond	Gristmill	(Exact date unknown), between 1725 and 1810	The Thurston's Creek/Springfield Grist Mill, located at Thurston's Creek/Springfield Gardens in present day Laurelton, New York, United States, Baisley Pond was named for a 19th century farmer who had a gristmill there that had been built in the 18th century.	Thurston Hollow looking downstream
Springfield Gardens, Queens	Brookville	Gristmill Sawmill	(Exact date unknown), between 1810 and 1870	The Conselyea Saw & Grist Mill, located on Conselyea's Pond at present day 147th Ave, Brookville, New York, United States,	Simonson Creek, Idlewild Park, Brookville Boulevard, Brookville, Queens.
Great Neck, New York	Saddle Rock Grist Mill	Tidemill	(Exact date unknown), between 1810 and 1870	The NRHP (listed 1978) Saddle Rock Mill museum, located at Udall's Millpond in present day North Hempstead, New York, United States,	Saddle Rock Grist Mill
Valley Stream, New York	Valley Stream Reservoir	Sawmill	(Exact date unknown), between 1810 and 1870	The Thompson Saw Mill, located above the Valley Stream reservoir at present day Valley Stream, New York, United States,	Thompson Saw Mill
Rosedale, New York	Watts	Mills Tidemill	(Exact date unknown), between 1810 and 1870	The Hungry Harbor Creek Mills, located on Hungry Harbor Creek (trib. Hook Creek) at present day Rosedale, New York, United States,	Long Island Queens
Port Washington, New York	Cock's	Gristmill Built by Adam Mott	1871	Cock's Grist Mill, was once located at the Baxter Estates millpond, torn down 20th century. Port Washington, New York, United States,	A Manhasset BayWalk sign at the North Hempstead Town Dock in Port Washington, NY on August 10, 2022.
North Hempstead, New York	Langdon	Gristmill	(Exact date unknown), between 1810 and 1870	The Langdon Grist Mill, located in Near Rockaway at present day Hempstead on the Mill River, Hempstead, New York, 11050, United States,	A gristmill on a creek
Glen Cove, New York	Musketa Cove	Gristmill Sawmill	Sawmill c.1669 Gristmill 1677	The Musketa Cove Plantation Grist Mill (1677), located at present day Glen Cove, New York, United States,	Corn Starch works, Glen Cove, L.I.
Hempstead, New York	Nichols	Gristmill	(Exact date unknown), between 1810 and 1870	The Nichols mill going south from Hempstead, located at present day Hempstead, New York, United States,	Hempstead, Town of Hempstead, Queens Co. L.I. NYPL1527304
Hempstead, New York	Oliver	Gristmill	(Exact date unknown), between 1810 and 1870	The Oliver mill going south from Hempstead, located at present day Hempstead, New York, United States,	Hempstead, Town of Hempstead, Queens Co. L.I. NYPL1527304
East Rockaway, New York	Haviland Mill	Gristmill	1689 (original construction)	The Haviland Mill in East Rockaway has a history dating back to 1689. Robert Davison, returning from his service during the American Revolution, found employment in the mill of Anthony DeMott, despite DeMott's loyalty to the British crown during the war. Despite DeMott's involvement in signaling to loyalist militia during a skirmish near the property in 1776, Davison and DeMott apparently had an amicable relationship. Davison worked in DeMott's mill for several years and eventually married DeMott's daughter, Nancy Ann.	Haviland-Davison Grist Mill, as seen in November 2014.
Rockville Centre	Mott Mill	Gristmill, Millpond	Pre-1852 (Established by Mordecai "Rock" Smith)	Reverend Mordecai "Rock" Smith, a miller by trade, owned and operated the mill, which was situated near Parsonage Creek on the Merrick and Jamaica Plank Road (Jamaica Ave) in Rockville Centre. During the Revolutionary War, the mill was operated by Anthony DeMott. Robert Davison, who served during the American Revolution, worked in DeMott's mill and later purchased the old Haviland mill in East Rockaway.	

== Nassau ==
Location	Name of mill and coordinates	Type	Built	Notes	Photograph
Roslyn	Roslyn Grist Mill	Gristmill	First decade of the 18th century (Exact date unknown), between 1715 and 1741	The Roslyn Grist Mill, located along Old Northern Boulevard in Roslyn, New York, United States, has a long history dating back to the early 18th century. John Robeson built the original gristmill on the site during the first decade of the 18th century. Robeson later sold the mill to Jeremiah Williams. Williams is believed to have constructed the current mill sometime between 1715 and 1741. After passing through several owners, the mill became the property of Hendrick Onderdonk in 1758. Onderdonk, who already operated two paper mills in the settlement then known as Hempstead Harbor, took over the operation of the Roslyn Grist Mill. Owners- John Robeson, Jeremiah Williams, Hendrick Onderdonk	Roslyn Grist Mill 20191030 03
Saddle Rock	Saddle Rock Grist Mill	Tidal mill	c. 1700 (constructed), restored to mid-19th-century appearance	The Saddle Rock Grist Mill is a historic grist mill building located in Saddle Rock, a village in the town of North Hempstead in Nassau County, New York. The mill is a 2+1/2-story gambrel-roofed structure, adjacent to a stream-fed millpond supplemented by tidal water impounded by the dam. Dating to the 18th century, it is the only extant, operating tidal grist mill on Long Island. The building underwent restoration in the 1950s and is operated as a local history museum, overlooking Little Neck Bay.	
Glen Cove	Carpenter's Sawmill	Sawmill	1661 (established)	Carpenter's Sawmill, also known as Carpenters Sawmill, was established in 1661 by Joseph Carpenter. It was located in Glen Cove, originally known as Mosquetah, later Musketo Cove, and at one time Pembroke. The sawmill was granted land on both sides of the river at Musketo Cove to settle two or three plantations and a saw and fulling mill. It was carried away by a freshet in 1699.	
Glen Cove	Carpenter's Fulling Mill	Fulling mill	1661 (established)	Carpenter's Fulling Mill, also known as Carpenters Fulling Mill, was established in 1661 by Joseph Carpenter. It was located in Glen Cove, originally known as Mosquetah, later Musketo Cove, and at one time Pembroke. The fulling mill was granted land on both sides of the river at Musketo Cove to settle two or three plantations and a saw and fulling mill.	Meadow Brook papermill
Dosoris Glen Cove	Dosoris Mills	Flouring mill	1760 (Captain John Butler)	Dosoris is situated on the Sound, two miles north of Glen Cove. Captain John Butler purchased East Island in 1760 and built the first flouring mill of Dosoris on the dam between East Island and the mainland. His son-in-law, Nathaniel Coles, added by purchase the remainder of the Woolsey estate, and his four sons erected two more mills on the dam between the two islands. The first mill was taken down, and the two others were destroyed by fire.	
Mill River Hempstead	Hempstead Mills	Flouring mill	1860 (Higginson's map of Kings and a large part of Queens counties)	Heemstede is situated mid-island, two miles south of Glen Cove. Along the Mill river from Mineola to Rockville Center are 3 gristmills, Nicholls, Oliver and Langdon ending at Hempstead pond near Rockville. Until 1899 this was considered Queens County.	
Millburn Creek Millburn	Pine Mill	Flouring mill	1686	Baldwin is situated on Hicks Neck, north of Baldwin Bay between the Parsonage creek and Millburn creek. Along the Millburn creek where the Meroke Indian made Wampum, John Pine built a gristmill that served the Hicks settlement.	
Mill Pond Jerusalem	Jerusalem Mill	Flouring mill	1700s	Jerusalem is situated around Seaman Pond, 2 Miles north of the Jones beach causway. COL. JOHN JACKSON GRANTED WHOLE LIBERTY AND PRIVILEGE JERUSALEM RIVER 1704; ALSO CONBURY PATENT 1708 FROM QUEEN ANNE. Early settler accounts refer to Wantagh as "Jerusalem", Wantagh was the sachem (chief) of the Merokee tribe in 1647. The creek running north–south through Wantagh, and which has been covered up in many places but is still visible between the Wantagh Parkway and the housing developments west of Wantagh Avenue, was originally the Jerusalem River.	

== Suffolk ==
Location	Name of mill and coordinates	Type	Built	Notes	Photograph
Centerport	Centerport Tide Mill	Tide mill	1674	The original Mill Dam and tide mill were built in 1674 at a site south of the present location. The bridge at the current location was first constructed in 1774 by Sylvanus Townsend. The mill was dismantled in 1915	Mill Dam Historic Marker
Huntington Harbor	Crippen Mill (circa 1658)	Grist mill	Circa 1658	The Crippen House was originally constructed around 1658 as a grist mill. It remained in use as a mill until 1672.	
Huntington Harbor	Zophar Platt's Tide Mill (1752)	Tide mill	1752	Zophar Platt's tide mill was demolished in 1930.	
Patchogue	Squire Mott Grist Mill	Gristmill	1814	Near this site in 1814, Charles "Squire" Mott constructed a dam at Swan River and put a grist mill on it and, adjacent to it, a home. Mills like Squire Mott's, and later factories on Patchogue's three streams, established it as a manufacturing center on the south shore of Long Island earning Patchogue its first nickname, "Milltown". The Union Twine and Swan River Mills, occupied in the manufacture of carpet warp and twine, also give employment to many people.	
Patchogue	Terry's Gristmill	Gristmill	1767 (first building), 1822 (second building)	Terry's gristmill is a historic landmark located in Patchogue. The first building was erected in 1767, and a second building was constructed in 1822.	
Stony Brook	Stony Brook Grist Mill	Grist mill	1699 (construction), c. 1751 (mill structure)	The Stony Brook Grist Mill is a Registered Historic Place property in Stony Brook, Suffolk County, New York. Its construction in 1699 created the Mill Pond astride the Brookhaven-Smithtown boundary. The mill structure itself dates back to at least circa 1751. Today, the Ward Melville Heritage Organization owns and operates the mill as a working mill museum.	Stony Brook Grist Mill
Lloyd Harbor	Lloyd Harbor Tide Mill	Tide mill	Date unknown		
Lloyd Harbor	Van Wyck-Lefferts Tide Mill	Tide mill	About 1793	The Van Wyck-Lefferts Tide Mill is a historic tide mill located at Lloyd Harbor in Suffolk County, New York. It was built about 1793 and is a 3+1/2-story, gable-roofed, timber-framed rectangular building little altered since the early 19th century. The property also includes the earthen mill dam with sluice gates. The Nature Conservancy, which owns the mill, offers free boat tours to the site from May through October.	EXTERIOR, LOOKING NORTHWEST – Lefferts Tide Mill, Huntington Harbor, Southdown Road, Huntington, Suffolk County, NY HAER NY,52-LOHA,2-2
Southold	Benedict Tide Mill	Tide mill	1640s (erected)	The Benedict Tide Mill, also known as Benedict Mill, was erected in the 1640s by Thomas Benedict. It holds a place of distinction in American history as the first recorded English mill in the New World. Located in Southold, it was the first mill on Long Island's east end. Using English waterwheel mill technology, it harnessed the power of the tides in what was once known as Benedict's Creek, then Tom's Creek, and now, Mill Creek.	
Southold	Peconic or Goldsmith Inlet Grist Mill	Tidal mill Windmill added 1870	1839–1840 (constructed)	The Peconic or Goldsmith Inlet Grist Mill, located at Goldsmith's Inlet in the Town of Southold on the North Fork of Long Island, New York, had its beginnings in 1836 when plans were first made for its construction. Built as a tidal mill on the inlet, construction started in 1839 and was completed in 1840. The windmill was added in 1870 and was damaged in the hurricane of 1989. Razed 1906. The original Vail windmill was at this site.	Peconic windmill
Islip	Paper Mill on Oriwie Lake	Paper mill	1820	Patented to Stephen Van Cortlandt, in 1697; east of this neck was the land granted to John Mowbray, in 1708, extending to the Oriwie Creek. Mowbray acquired this tract of land from the Van Cortlandt brothers, who had bought it from the Secatoag five years prior, viz, in 1703. Papermill built 1820Paper mill built 1820	PAPER MILL ON ORIWIE LAKE. ISLIP
Mattituck	Mill on Mattituck Creek	Watermill	1820	The Mill on Mattituck Creek was built by Richard Cox in 1820.	Old Mill Inn; Mattituck, NY-1
Water Mill	Water Mill Museum	Water mill	Mid-17th century (built)	The Water Mill Museum is a historic water mill and local history museum located at 41 Old Mill Road, Water Mill in Suffolk County, New York, USA. The museum is housed in a 2-story, heavy wood-frame structure with a wood-shingle exterior, consisting of two building sections. It features a 2-story, square-shaped main section and a 1-story, one-bay wing. Attached to the rear is a 2+1/2-story tower and 1-story glassed-in porch. The mill structure dates back to the mid-17th century and operated as a mill until the early 20th century. When the LIRR right of way slowed the flow of water a windmill was added, after a successful lawsuit and return of the water it was removed.	WaterMill wheel 20180913

== See also ==
- List of windmills in New York

== Sources ==
- "History of Long Island" (PDF). Eagle Library. XXIX (182). 1914.
