= Vandever =

Vandever is a surname. Notable people with the surname include:

- Ira Vandever (born 1980), American football player
- William Vandever (1817–1893), American politician and Union Army general

== See also ==
- Vandeveer
