= Gerritsen Creek =

Creek in Brooklyn, New York

Coordinates: 40°35′09″N 73°54′43″W

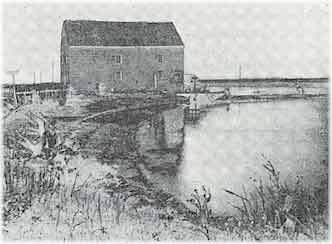
The Gerritsen Creek tidal mill in the 19th century

Gerritsen Creek is a short watercourse in Brooklyn, New York City, that empties into Jamaica Bay. The creek has been described as one of the "fingers" that formed the original shoreline of Jamaica Bay. The creek lies just beyond the maximum extent of the Wisconsin Glacier.

== Course ==
The creek currently starts near Avenue U, but its original headwaters lay eight streets farther north, in what is now Midwood. Within that neighborhood, Bay Avenue and Olean Street run diagonally to the rest of the street grid, flanking the former path of the creek. The creek had been truncated to the intersection of Nostrand Avenue and Kings Highway by the early 20th century, flowing southeast through the neighborhood of Marine Park. That part of the creek was buried in a storm sewer in 1920.

The creek's mouth and much of its remaining length is part of a public park called Marine Park; the head contains the Salt Marsh Nature Center, while the artificial Mau Mau Island is located nearby. According to Touring Gotham's Archaeological Past, the mill and the dam for its tide pond were between Avenues W and V, and the mill pond beyond the dam extended past Fillmore Avenue. In recent decades, efforts have been made to restore parts of the creek, particularly the salt marsh near its mouth, to a state closer to its natural one before modern settlement. In 2012 the U.S. Army Corps of Engineers budgeted $8.3 million for the restoration.

== Usage ==
Archeological investigation has determined that Native American people started to settle permanently in the creek's watershed as early as 5,000 BCE. The creek's name comes from a historic grist mill built on the creek's shore in the 17th century. The mill, a tide mill, the first to be built in North America, was built when the area was colonized by the Dutch. The mill remained in use for hundreds of years, until 1890. There were early proponents of preserving heritage buildings who lobbied for its preservation. Mayor Jimmy "Beau James" Walker was brought to the site to view the structure. However, no efforts were made, and the abandoned building was burned by an arsonist in 1935.

Recreational boaters regularly abandon unwanted and damaged recreational craft near the creek's mouth. The small salvage firm White Cap Marine Towing and Salvage, of Sheepshead Bay, specializes in rescuing or salvaging the smaller recreational vessels and smaller fishing vessels that operate out of the smaller inlets around Jamaica Bay, and is also a franchisee of Sea Tow, the leading marine assistance services company. It has a contract to keep the area clear of abandoned vessels.
