= Oliver Ingraham Lay =

American painter

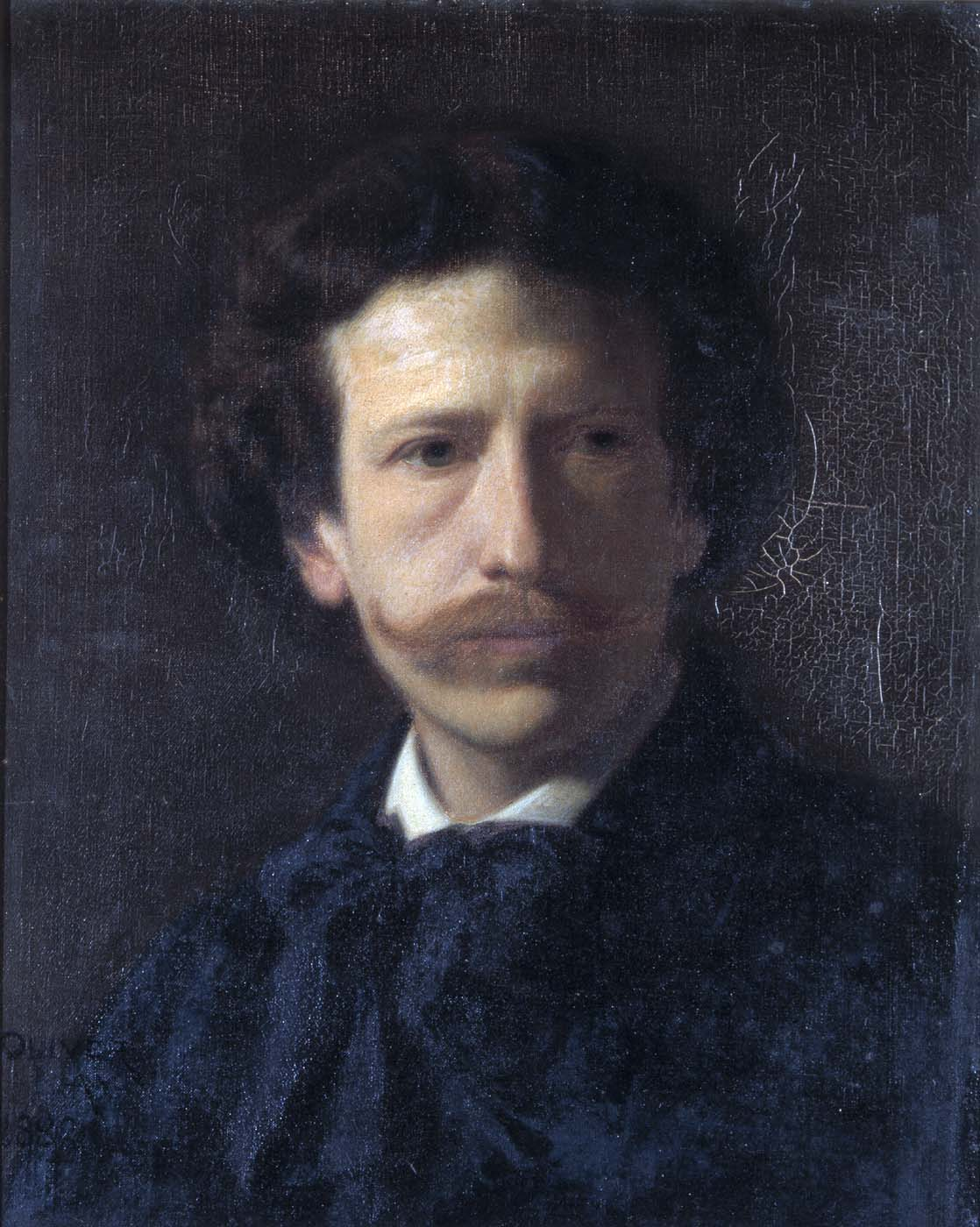
Self-portrait of Oliver Ingraham Lay, 1882

Oliver Ingraham Lay (c. 1845-1890), was an American portrait painter.

Lay received his earliest art education in the United States. He traveled to Europe in 1860 he returned to the United States and began his professional career as an artist. He was an exhibitor at the Century Association and the National Academy of Design. His clients included President Ulysses S. Grant and actor Edwin Booth.

He died on June 28, 1890, in Stratford, Connecticut. He was buried at the New York Cemetery Cedar Hill Cemetery and Mausoleum.

He was married to Hester Marian Wait Lay (1845-1900). They had a son, Charles Lay, who became an American architect.

His works are in museum collections in the United States and England, including the National Academy of Design, the Smithsonian American Art Museum, Art Gallery of the Royal Shakespeare Theatre (Stratford-upon-Avon, England). He also has a collection of documents at the Archives of American Art.

== Gallery ==
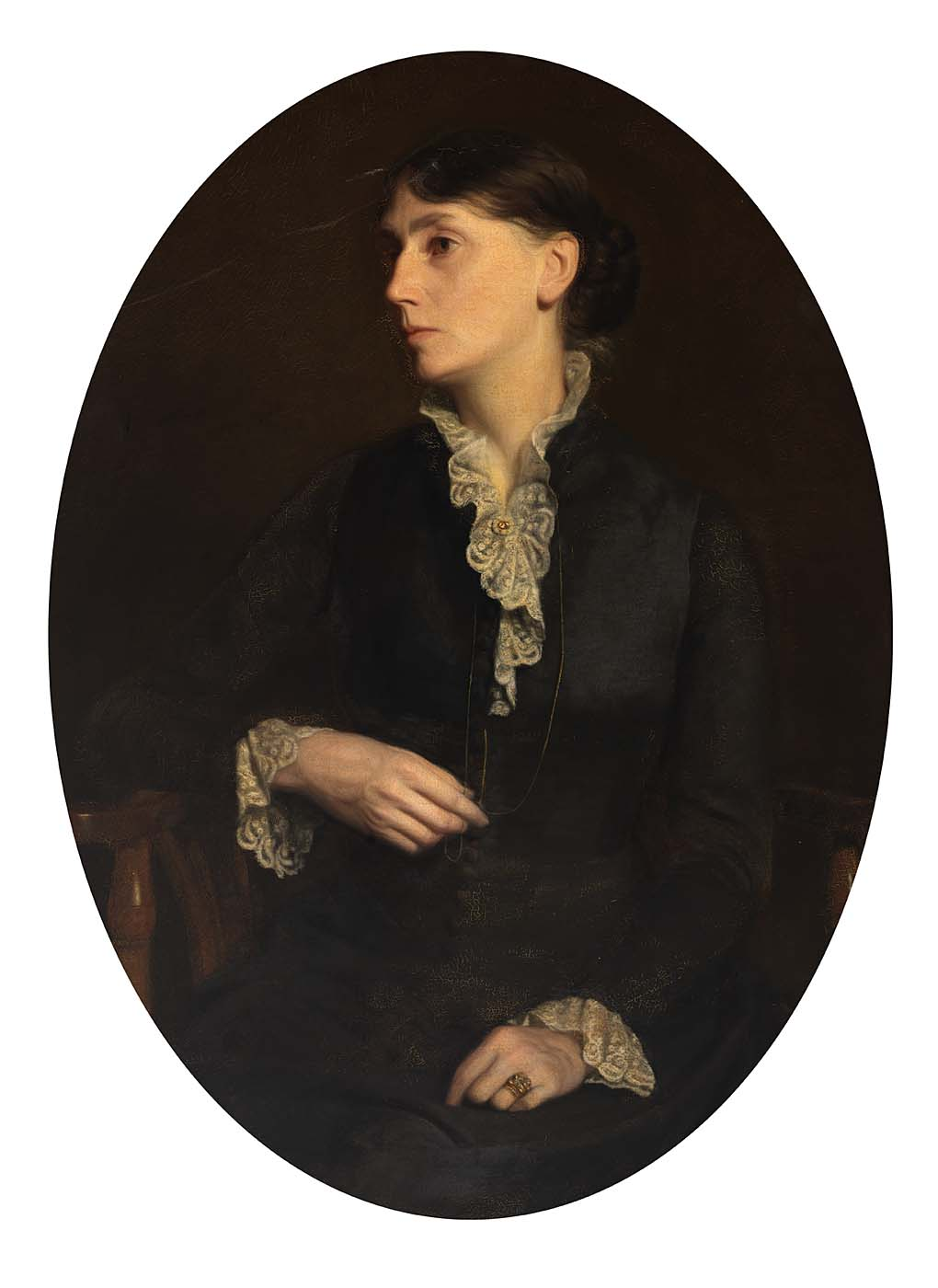
Fidelia Bridges

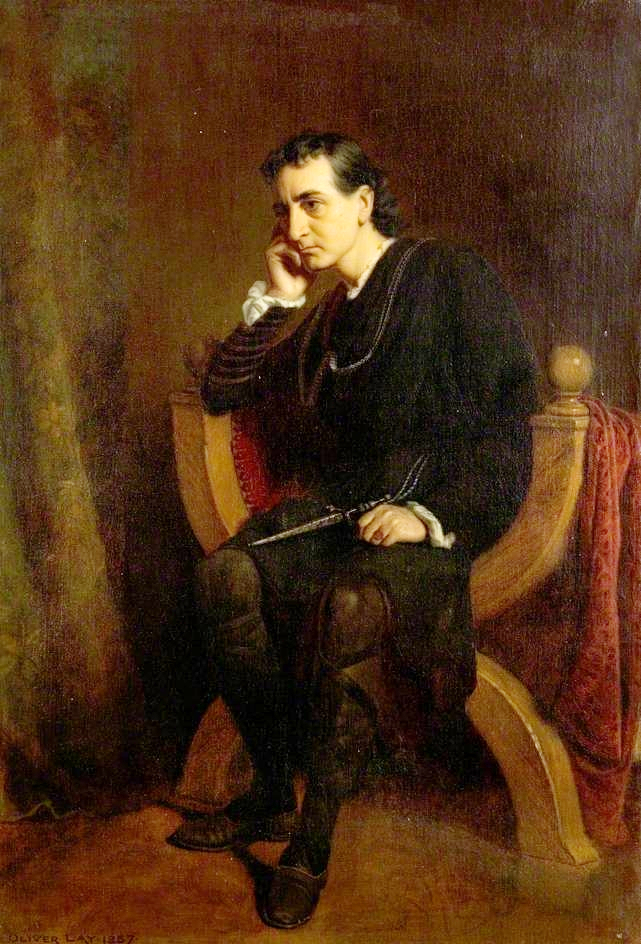
Edwin Booth as Hamlet, 1887

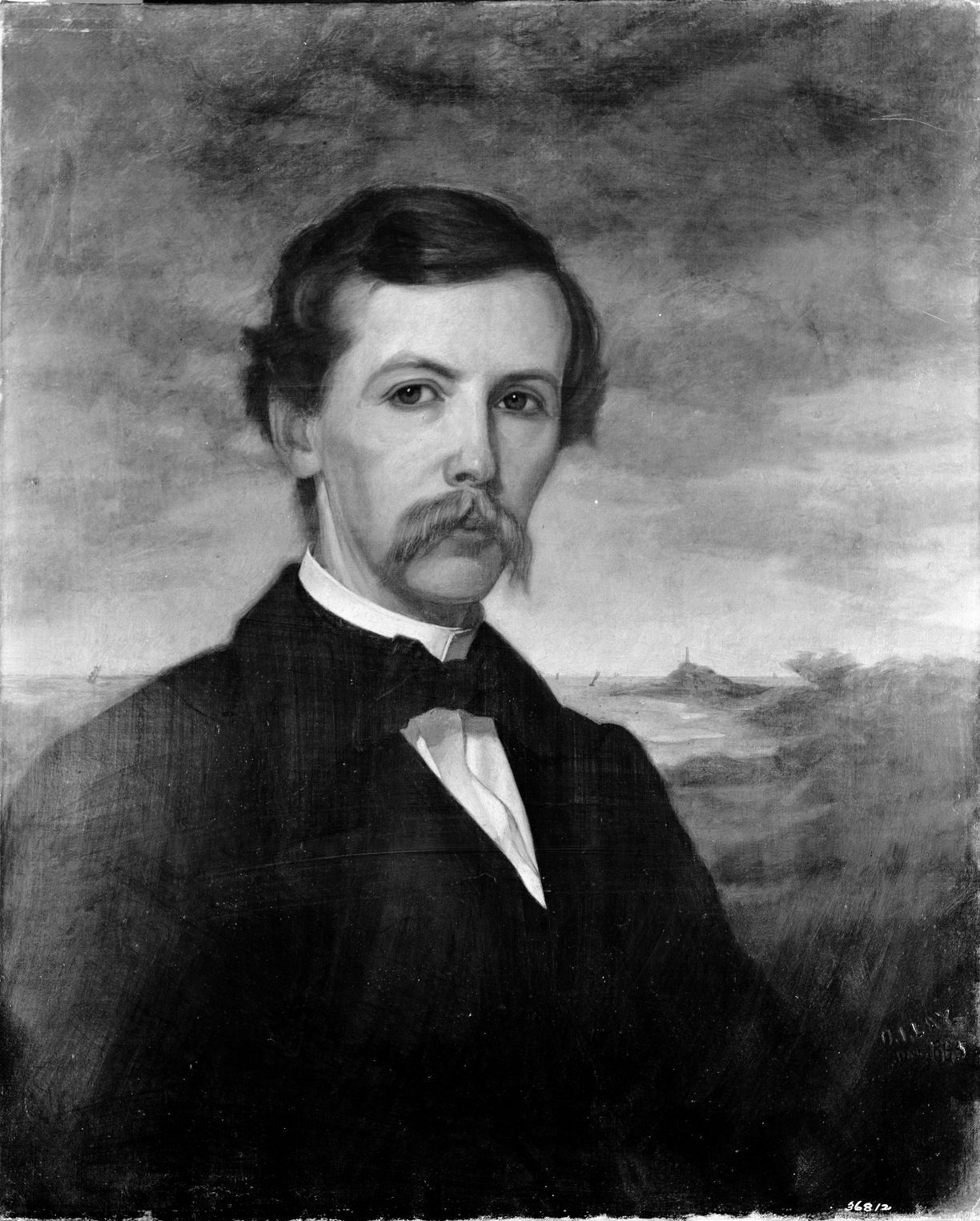
Abraham Caulkins Morris (1822-1879), oil on canvas by Oliver Ingraham Lay found at the Frick Art Research Library Photoarchive
