= Bethel AME Church and Manse =

Historic church in New York, United States

- U.S. National Register of Historic Places
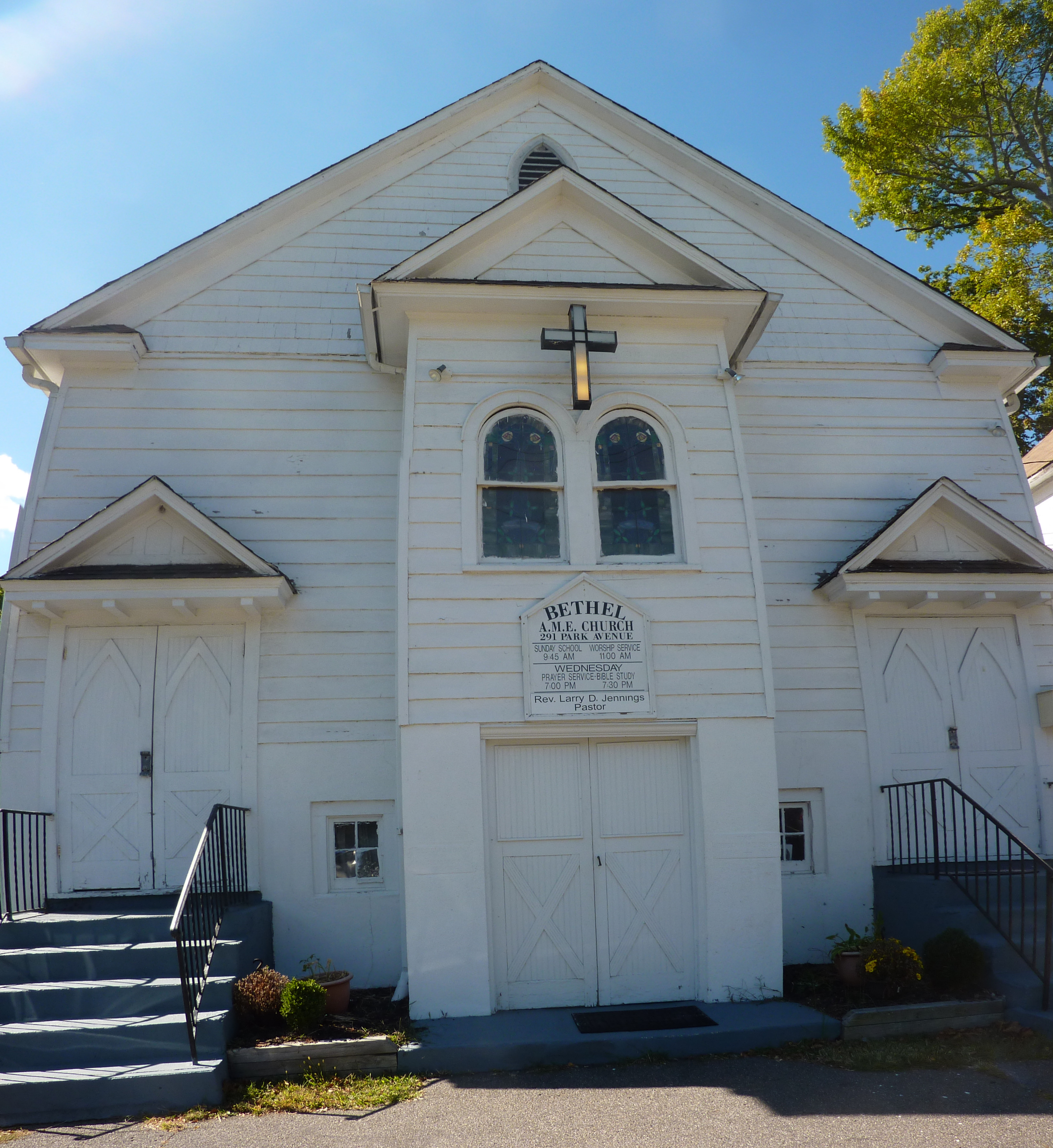
- The church in September 2013

- Location within New York Location within the United States
- Location: 291 Park Avenue, Huntington, New York
- Coordinates: 40°52′41″N 73°25′7″W
- Area: less than one acre
- Built: 1845
- MPS: Huntington Town MRA
- NRHP reference No.: 85002490
- Added to NRHP: September 26, 1985

Bethel AME Church and Manse is a historic African Methodist Episcopal church and manse at 291 Park Avenue in Huntington, Suffolk County, New York. The church was cofounded by Peter Crippen and Nelson Smith in 1843 and built about 1845 and is a 1 1/2-story, wood-frame structure that is rectangular in plan with a gable roof and clapboard exterior. The manse was built in 1915 and is a 2-story, wood-frame structure, with a two-by-two-bay square plan.

It was added to the National Register of Historic Places in 1985.
