= Vandeveer =

Vandeveer is a surname. Notable people with the surname include:

- Ferdinand Vandeveer Hayden (1829–1887), American geologist
- Logan Vandeveer (died 1855), Texas Ranger
- Michael Vandeveer, American politician
- Ray Vandeveer (born 1953), American politician

== See also ==
- Van der Veer
