= Charles Downing Lay =

American architect (1877–1956)

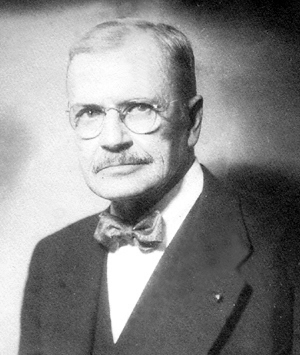
- Born: September 3, 1877; Newburgh, New York
- Died: February 15, 1956 (aged 78); Stratford, Connecticut
- Occupation: Landscape architect
- Parents: Oliver Ingraham Lay (father); Hester Marian Wait (mother)

Olympic medal record

Art competitions
Silver medal – second place	1936 Berlin	Town planning

Charles Downing Lay (September 3, 1877 – February 15, 1956) was an American landscape architect.

== Early life and family estate ==
The son of Oliver Ingraham Lay, a professional painter, and Hester Marian Wait Lay, Charles Downing Lay was born in Newburgh, New York. At age 7, Lay began spending summers with his grandmother in Stratford, Connecticut. Her house was located at 95 Chapel Street, which is approximately 100 yards (91 m) away from the banks of the Housatonic River. Lay spent much of his childhood in Stratford fishing, sailing, and swimming and developed a great appreciation for nature. The Housatonic, along with the Long Island Sound, would greatly influence the course of Lay's career.

Lay inherited his grandmother's estate, the land he first fell in love with, in 1900 and he remained there until his death in 1956. The property was not extensive and although the landscape was informal, there was little to suggest a truly naturalistic landscape. Walls, ramps, and steps with planting occupied the slope between houses, with interesting plants planted in a casual manner. There was little space between the houses and the country road to the north; the outdoor living areas were focused on the south view toward Long Island. These areas were bounded by old stone walls with large lawns and perennial borders surrounding the grounds. Always planning further improvements, he often experimented in growing new plants. In 1947, shortly before retirement, Lay bought 85 acres (340,000 m^{2}) in Lyme, Connecticut, near Selden Creek, where he spent time with his wife and family during the summers. He described this land as "farm grown to woods which I subconsciously had been longing for."

== Education and career ==
Lay attended the School of Architecture at Columbia University from 1896 to 1900 before transferring to Harvard University's School of Landscape Architecture, from which he graduated in 1902, the second man to achieve a Bachelor of Science degree in the field. The first, Henry Hubbard, had been Lay's teacher when Lay was working on his M.L.A. in 1906-1908 and in 1910, Hubbard and Lay, in partnership with Robert Wheelwright, opened a landscape architecture firm in New York City. They practiced under the name Lay, Hubbard, and Wheelwright and began publishing the professional journal Landscape Architecture in October 1910. In 1911, the journal was named the official publication of the American Society of Landscape Architects, a title it still holds today. Lay served as an editor and manager until 1921.

Aware of significant population growth in American cities during the early 20th-century, Lay became increasingly concerned with the availability of urban outdoor space. He worked for New York City's Parks Department from 1913 to 1914 and proposed improvements to Albany, New York. During World War I, Lay was a planner for the United States Housing Corporation and served as a consultant on the planning and development of Navy air and service stations during World War II. In addition to a wide variety of commissions from private clients, Lay designed public parks in New York City; Albany; Troy, New York; Schenectady, New York; Brooklyn; Washington, D.C.; and Stratford, Connecticut; well as for the United States Housing Corporation in Erie, Pennsylvania and Butler, Pennsylvania. Building on his interest in urban planning, he developed some of the first subdivisions in suburban New York, Massachusetts, Rhode Island, and Connecticut. Interested in providing greater access to outdoor space for citizens of New York City, Lay also completed a study for a Nassau County, New York, park system, which now numbers 83 parks. In addition to his other accomplishments, Lay received a silver medal from the 1936 Berlin Olympics for his work on Marine Park in Brooklyn.

== Projects ==
Charles Downing Lay designed or contributed to the design of countless parks, subdivisions, private estates, and gardens throughout the United States, although his influence was most apparent on the East Coast.

Some of his major projects include:

- Marine Park, Brooklyn
- Battery Park, New York City
- Bryant Park, New York City
- John Jay Park, New York City
- Madison Square Park, New York City
- Initial design of the grounds for the National Academy of Sciences, Washington, D.C.

== Legacy ==
In his professional writings and landscape practice, Lay frequently advocated for a closer relationship between man and nature and argued that natural resources could be beneficial for society if not misused. His lifelong love for the landscape around Statford, Connecticut, led Lay to found the Housatonic Valley Conference in 1937, later renamed the Housatonic Valley Association. The HVA now protects all 2,000 square miles (5,200 km^{2}) of the tri-state region known as the Housatonic River Valley. The Association helps with conservation and cleanup of the Valley and has saved more than 5,000 acres (20 km^{2}) of farmland wetlands, riverfronts, and forests.

== Timeline ==
- 1877: September 3 Born, Newburgh, New York
- 1896–1900: Attends Columbia University, School of Architecture
- 1900–1902: Attends Harvard University- S.B. in Landscape Architecture
- 1904: Studied under Mahonri Young, Allen Tucker, and Gifford Beal in independent practice
- 1910: Founds Hubbard, Lay and Wheelwright with Henry V. Hubbard and Robert Wheelwright
- 1910–1921: Serves an editor and manager of Landscape Architecture magazine
- 1913–1914: Employed by City of New York, Department of Parks
- 1924: Designs initial plans for grounds at National Academy of Sciences in Washington D.C.
- 1917–1919: Works as planner for United States Housing Corporation (World War I)
  - Plans for improvements of Albany, New York
  - Designs Marine Park, Brooklyn
- 1934: Receives Oberlaender Trust grant to study public recreation in Germanic countries
- 1936: Wins silver medal for plans for Marine Park at the 11th Olympiad in Berlin
- 1937: Founds Housatonic Valley Conference
- 1939: Consults on landscape of the New York World's Fair
- 1941–1945: Consults on naval air and service stations (World War II)
- 1945: Elected into the National Academy of Design
- 1956 February 15: Dies

== See also ==
- Landscape architecture
- History of gardening
- New York City
- Park
