= Peter Crippen House =

Coordinates: 40°52′57″N 73°25′18″W

The Peter Crippen House is a former grist mill in Huntington, New York. Built c. 1658, the building is in a serious state of disrepair as of 2023. Activists are seeking to raise funds for its restoration and pursuing its listing on the National Register of Historic Places due to its prior occupancy by Peter Crippen, a free black African Methodist Episcopal minister who was a prominent resident of the area.

== Life of Peter Crippen ==
Crippen was born circa 1809 on a Virginia plantation owned by Thomas Crippen, a Quaker who emancipated all his enslaved individuals, including Peter's parents, in accordance with a 1782 Virginia law. Thus, Peter was born a free person. Despite this, financial constraints, travel hazards, and legal obstacles delayed Peter's family's relocation. However, in 1818, Sarah Crippen, inheriting the plantation, filed a new deed of manumission for Peter and his father. After migrating north, he held various jobs and became one of two black landowners in Huntington having purchased the former gristmill.

By the 1830s, following Nat Turner's Rebellion, life as a free Black person in Virginia became increasingly challenging. Peter's father died in the late 1820s, prompting Peter to seek opportunities elsewhere. Around 1836, he migrated to a brickyard in Huntington, New York, responding to active recruitment efforts. He later settled in Cold Spring Harbor, working for a wealthy family and in the West Hills section. Near Huntington Harbor, Peter supported his family through fishing, clamming, seaweed gathering, and employment with local farmers, alongside tending his small garden. Throughout various census records over the years, Crippen's occupations are consistently documented as laborer or fisherman.

A prominent figure in the local African American community, Crippen co-founded the Bethel AME Church (listed on the National Register in 1985) in Huntington in 1843. His neighbor, Nelson Smith, also served as a trustee in the church's incorporation. Crippen's acquisition marked a significant achievement, providing security and stability for his family amidst a small African American community. Landownership by African Americans was uncommon during this era, with only a handful of individuals, including Crippen and Smith, recorded as landowners.

Crippen died in 1875 at approximately 65 years old, but his family retained ownership of the house into the early 21st century.

== History of the mill house ==
The Peter Crippen House stands as a significant connection to Huntington's African American history of the nineteenth century. Regrettably, the house, left vacant for two decades, has deteriorated significantly. In late 2019, the Town of Huntington acquired the property with intentions to convert it into a parking lot for the adjacent Town sewer plant.

The Crippen House, originally erected around 1658, served as a grist mill in its initial incarnation. Operating as a mill until 1672, concerns regarding the health risks associated with its mill pond prompted its closure. Subsequently, the mill structure was sold and relocated approximately 525 yards north to its present site, adjacent to the head of Huntington Harbor, where it underwent conversion into a residential dwelling around 1674. Preliminary examination of the building affirms its industrial origins rather than residential construction. Its robust timber framework, dimensions, and sturdy proportions are characteristic of the industrial Dutch framing prevalent during that period. The building stands as a rare and early surviving exemplar of this architectural type.

Over the ensuing two centuries, the ownership of both the mill structure and its surrounding property changed hands among various local residents. Among these were members of the Scudder family, who seemingly erected another mill on Creek Road, and later Zophar Platt, who constructed a third mill farther north in 1752. Subsequently, John Brush acquired the Platt mill and the property encompassing the initial mill building in 1785. Prior to 1835, the first mill building came under the ownership of the Johnson family, who subsequently sold it to Elbert Walters. In 1854, Walters transferred a small parcel situated immediately south of the original mill building to an African American individual named Nelson Smith. A decade later, Walters sold the repurposed mill structure to Peter Crippen.

== Pursuit of historic designation ==
Although the house is in disrepair, its structure remains intact. The building reflects two aspects of Huntington's history: 17th-century industry and early African American landownership.

In 1985, Town Historian Rufus Langhans examined the house and proposed its acquisition by the town for relocation to a more suitable site conducive to its long-term preservation. However, this proposal was not pursued until 2006, when the Town allocated funding for an archaeological assessment of the property and an architectural evaluation of the house. Unfortunately, these studies were never completed due to uncertainties regarding the property's title, which had been informally passed down through generations since Peter Crippen's ownership.

By 2019, these title issues were resolved, prompting the Town's sewer district to acquire the property with intentions to demolish the house and construct a parking lot.

The Town put forth a proposal aimed at preserving as many components of the house as feasible. Upon media reports of the impending demolition, a wave of protest emerged from various sectors. In addition to numerous emails urging the Town to reassess its decision, an online petition garnered over a thousand signatures. Subsequently, a coalition comprising Town officials and community leaders convened to explore alternatives to demolition. Consequently, the Town Board opted to indefinitely postpone its plans for demolition.

The house occupies marshy terrain susceptible to flooding and finds itself flanked on two sides by the Town's sewer treatment facility. After deliberation, the committee reached a consensus that relocating the house to a more conducive environment for its long-term preservation while preserving its historical significance was imperative. Accordingly, a vacant parcel owned by the Town, situated on the opposite side of the sewer plant, was identified and chosen. This new site boasts greater visibility, positioned along a prominent north–south thoroughfare in the vicinity.

The overarching vision for the house entails its integration into a forthcoming African American history museum. In November 2020, the New York State Historic Preservation Office concluded that the Crippen House meets the criteria for inclusion on the National Register in two significant aspects. Firstly, under Criterion B for Ethnic History: Black, due to its connection with Peter Crippen. Secondly, under Criterion C for architecture, as one of the few surviving seventeenth-century mill buildings on Long Island.

== See also ==
- List of tide mills on Long Island
