= Neils =

Neils is a surname. Notable people with the surname include:

- Jenifer Neils (born 1950), American archaeologist
- Steve Neils (born 1951), American American football player

== See also ==
- Neil
- North East Indian Linguistics Society
