= Marine Park (Brooklyn park) =

Public park in Brooklyn, New York

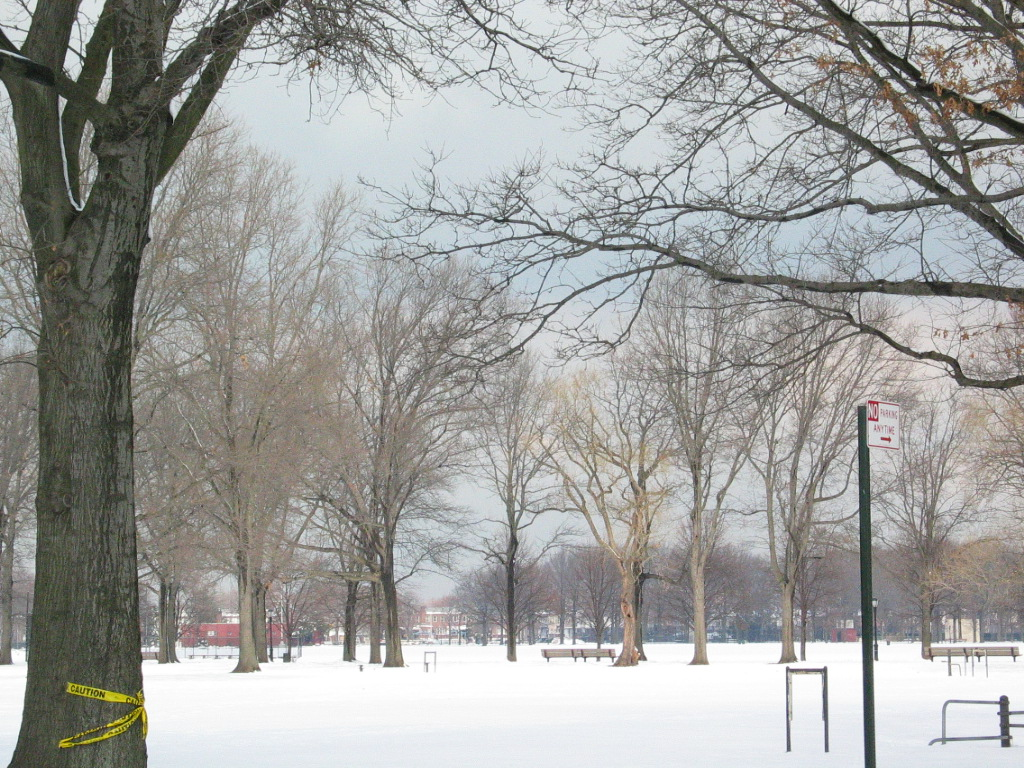
- In winter
- Interactive map of Marine Park
- Location: Marine Park, Brooklyn, New York
- Nearest city: New York City
- Coordinates: 40.598047°N 73.920836°W
- Area: 798 acres (323 ha)
- Created: 1924
- Operator: New York City Department of Parks and Recreation
- Open: 6 a.m. to 1 a.m.
- Status: open

Marine Park is a public park located on Jamaica Bay in the neighborhood of Marine Park in Brooklyn, New York. Its 798 acres (3.2 km^{2}) surround the westernmost inlet of the bay. Most of the land for Marine Park was donated to New York City to be turned into public park land by the Whitney family in 1920 and by Frederic B. Pratt and Alfred Tredway White, who jointly donated 150 acres (0.61 km^{2}) in 1917. The land donated consists of the area between the current day Fillmore Avenue and Gerritsen Avenue and East 38th Street. Originally almost 2,000 acres (810 ha), over half of which has been donated to the National Park Service as part of the Gateway National Recreation Area, the park is mainly a fertile salt marsh which is supplied with freshwater from Gerritsen Creek.

Marine Park consists of recreational park areas and the Salt Marsh Nature Center, where marsh birds, cottontail rabbits, horseshoe crabs, and oyster toadfish can be found.

== History ==
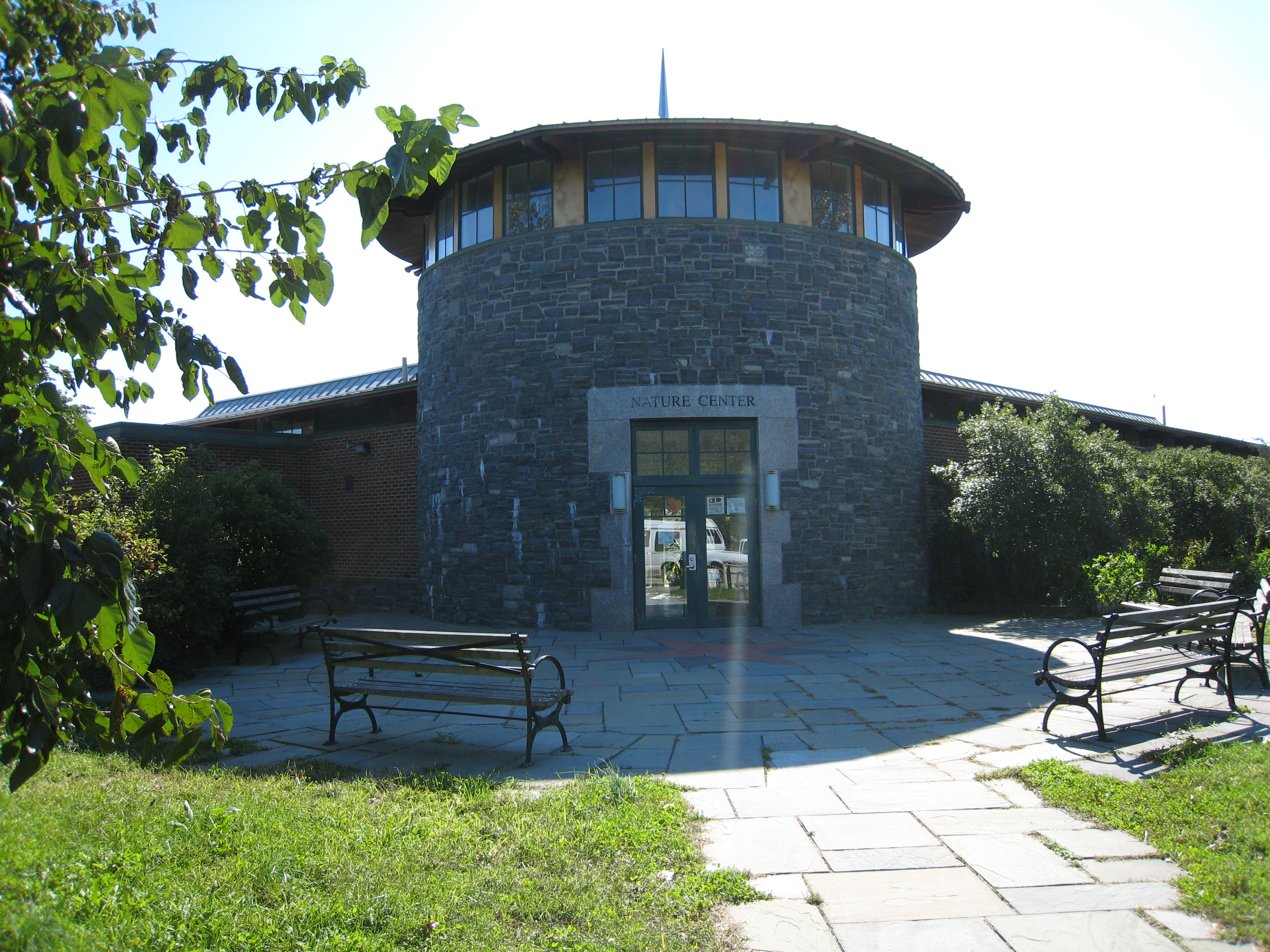
Marine Park's Salt Marsh Nature Center

The area was a hunting and fishing ground for Native Americans from the nearby village of Keshawchqueren. Pits for cooking and preparing food dating from 800 to 1400 AD were uncovered in Marine Park, along with deer and turtle bones, oyster shells, and sturgeon scales. In the 17th century, the Dutch began to settle in the area, which had similarities to the marshland and coastal plains of the Netherlands. The land proved to be fairly good farmland and there was an abundance of clams, oysters, and game from the region as well.

In the early 20th century, as industrialization swept the nation, developers made plans to turn Jamaica Bay into a port and prepared to dredge Rockaway Inlet to allow large ships into the proposed harbor. Speculators anticipated a real estate boom and bought land along the Jamaica Bay waterfront. However, donors including Alfred Tredway White and Frederic Pratt turned the land over to the city, with the requirement that it become parkland. Development was slow, but with new land purchases, the park grew to 1,822 acres (737 ha) by 1937. That same year, the Board of Aldermen named the site "Brooklyn Marine Park". The park's architect, Charles Downing Lay, won an Olympic silver medal in architecture for the park's design in 1936.

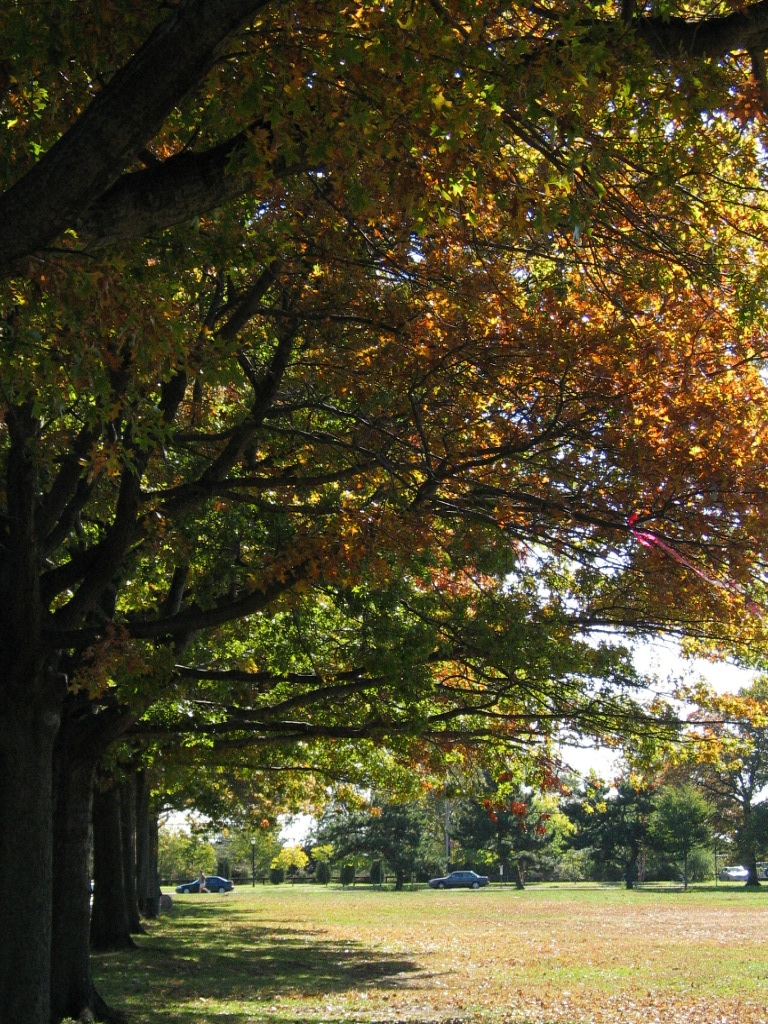
Tree lines in the park

The salt and fresh water mixture of the nature preserve and trail on the park land has had its own history. In the 18th century, George Washington made a stop for several days on the land nearby. There was a gristmill on the water at the time; in 1938, the mill burned down to the water level, leaving only the low tide wood pilings across the water that can be seen to this day. In the mid-20th century, the area was abused by trash and abandoned cars. At one point, it became a landfill, and trash piled to 60 feet (18 m) in certain areas. After a massive cleanup effort in the 1990s, the area was restored to its former glory, with exception of a few rusty car parts riddling the area and teens littering and causing arson to the dry tall Phragmites from time to time.

The park gained its land mass as a dump, leading to so many rats in the area that local children hunted them with bows and arrows in the 1960s. One neighborhood boy was bitten by a rat in his sleep.

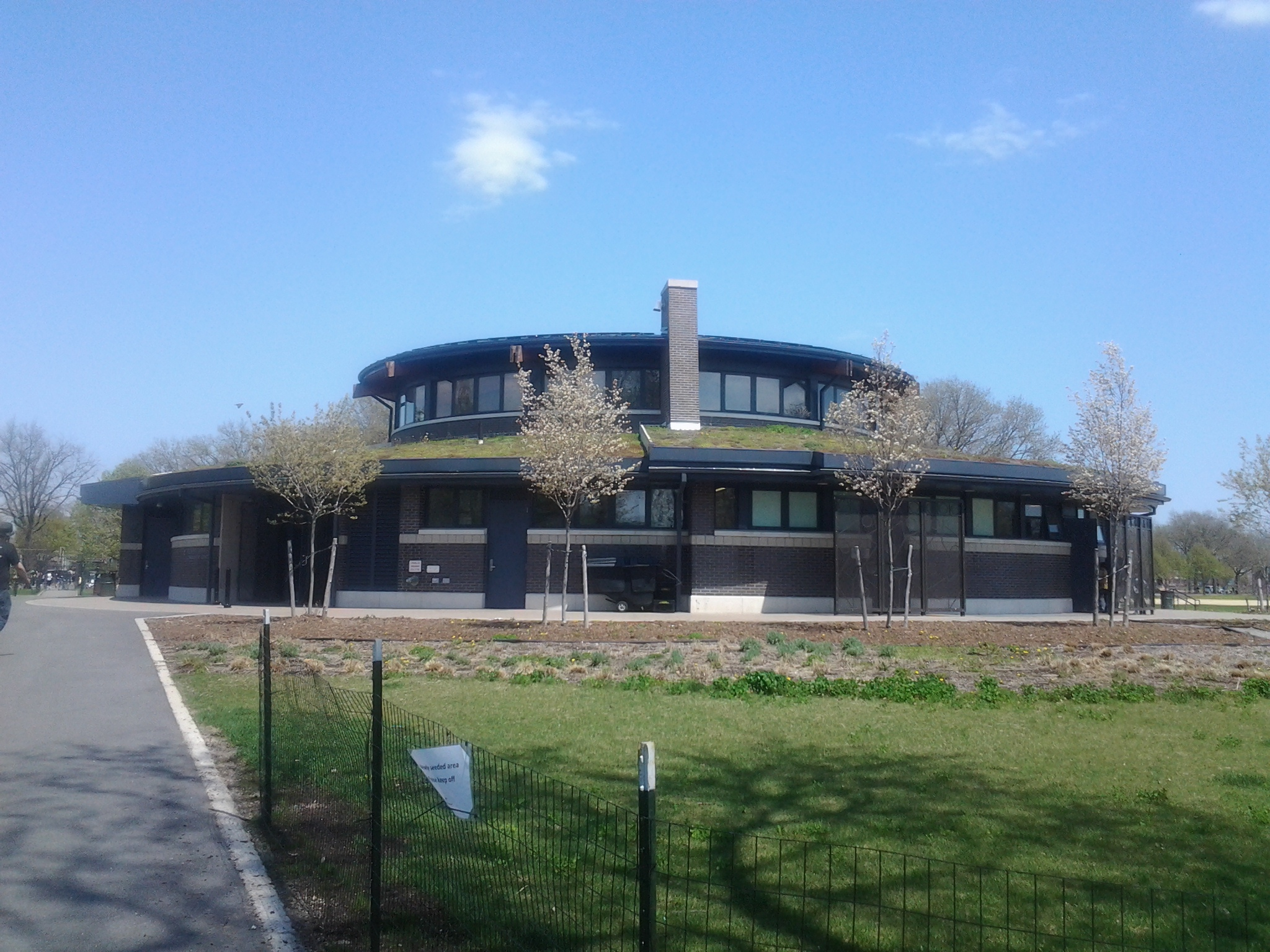
Carmine Carro Community Center

Recreational facilities were built in the decades to follow, including the Pratt-White athletic field (1939) that was dedicated to the two fathers of Marine Park. A 210-acre (0.85 km^{2}) golf course opened in 1963, and the John V. Lindsay Model Airport was dedicated in 1971. The golf course was designed by renowned course architect Robert Trent Jones and hosts several pro-am golf tournaments, including the Brooklyn Open and the Jamaica Open NY Golf Tournament. New ballfields were opened in 1979 and named for baseball-loving NYPD Officer Rocco Torre in 1997. Nature trails established along Gerritsen Creek in 1984-85 invite parkgoers to observe a wealth of flora and fauna. Ongoing improvements at the end of the 20th century include the reconstruction of basketball, tennis, and bocce courts; of baseball fields; and of Lenape Playground at Avenue U. A new nature center opened in 2000, and the Carmine Carro Community Center opened in 2013.

Eight pickleball courts were completed in 2023, but they were beginning to deteriorate by 2025.

== Facilities ==
Marine Park boasts the most park facilities in the borough of Brooklyn. It offers 2 Baseball fields 11 Softball fields 10 Basketball courts 3 Bocce courts 4 Cricket fields 2 Football fields 10 Handball courts 6 Pickleball courts 10 Soccer fields 12 Tennis courts 4 Playgrounds with spray showers 1 Adult Fitness Area 60+ Garden beds 2 Parking lots 1 Bike rental concession 1 Golf course 15 miles of walking paths including the .8-mile Oval track for bicycles, walkers and runners Several sports fields, and 0.83 mile-long running path were all built on the ancient Keshawchqueren burial ground. Part of the park, including the fields north of Avenue U, were built atop Gerritsen Creek.

Marine Park also contains a golf course, which occupies the park's eastern half. The 210-acre (85 ha) golf course opened in 1963 and contains a driving range.

New York Road Runners hosts a weekly 2.5-mile Open Run.

== Geographical features ==
Marine Park contains most of the remaining length of Gerritsen Creek. The head of the creek is located adjacent to the Salt Marsh Nature Center. The creek's headwaters originally were located eight avenues north of its current source at Avenue U, but the northern part of the creek was buried in a storm sewer in 1920. The creek has been described as one of the "fingers" that formed the original shoreline of Jamaica Bay.

Mau Mau Island, also called White Island, is an artificial island within the park, located between two branches of Gerritsen Creek. Created possibly by 1934, it was made out of garbage. It was supposed to be included within an expansion of the golf course, which was never built; a temporary bridge was the only object erected from this plan, and only the footers from this bridge remain.

The eastern part of Marine Park, to the east of Mau Mau Island, was originally part of an island called Riches Meadows. The island was bounded by two creeks, Mill Creek and Deep Creek, which then led to Mill Basin, located across Flatbush Avenue to the northeast.

== Community center ==
The Carmine Carro Community Center, named for Carmine Carro, a local activist and park advocate who served as president for the Marine Park Civic Association, opened in March 2013. The building's “green” elements include solar panels, a geothermal heating and cooling system, and a green roof. Because of these energy-saving features, the Parks Department is seeking LEED Silver certification for the building.

== Gallery ==
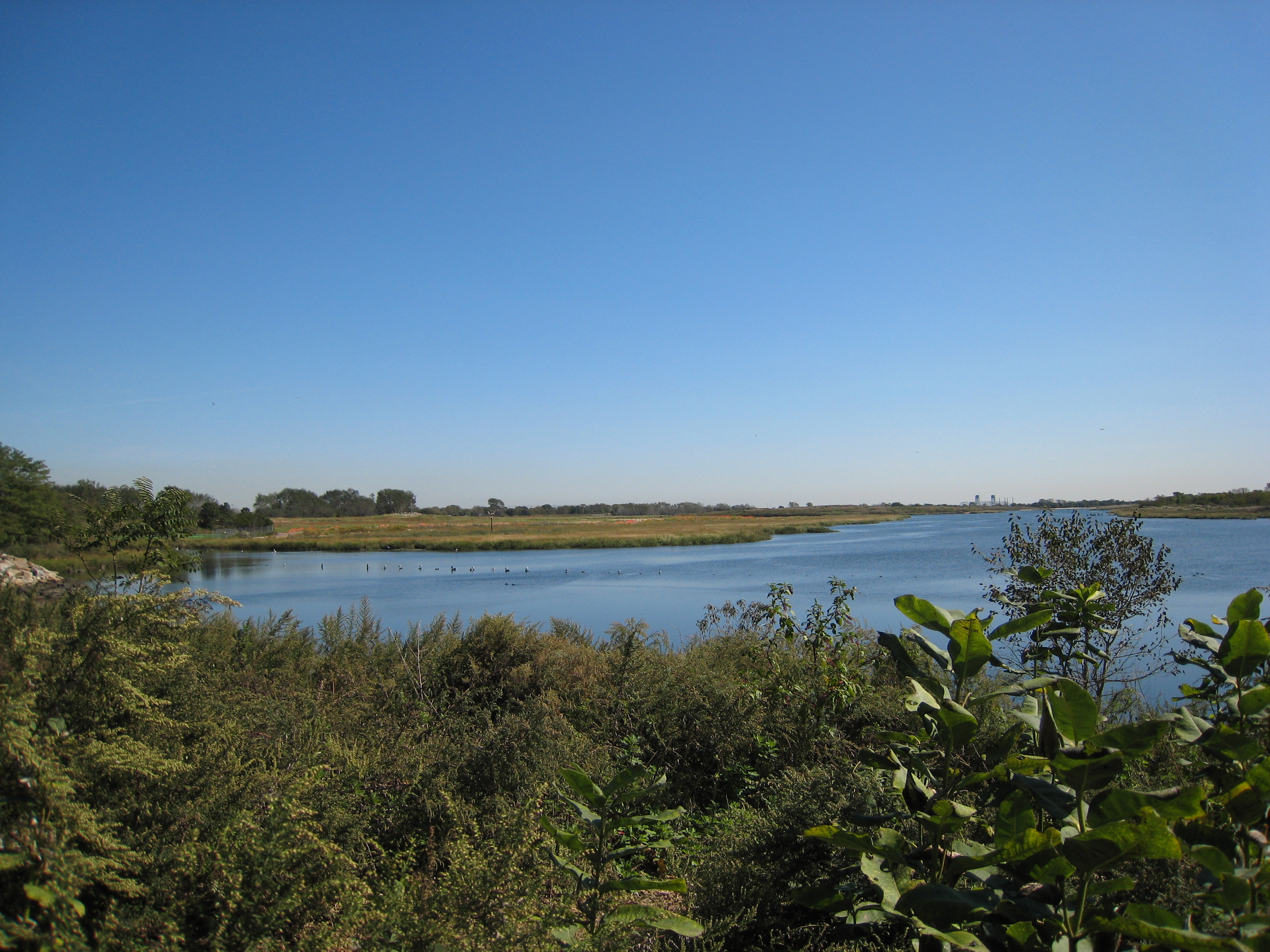
Overview of the Gerritsen Creek

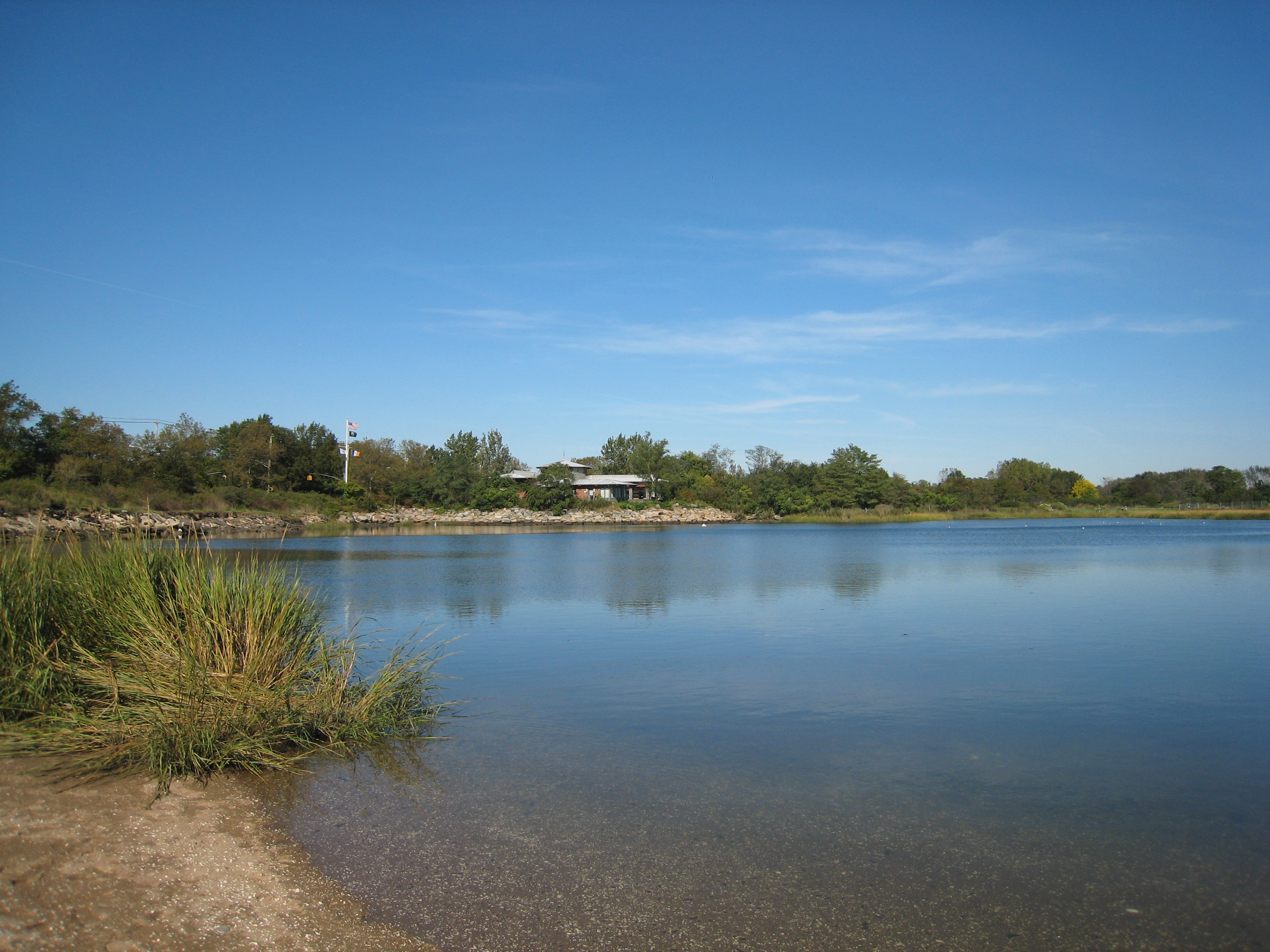
Looking on the nature center building, from the shore

Sounds of nature near the salt marsh

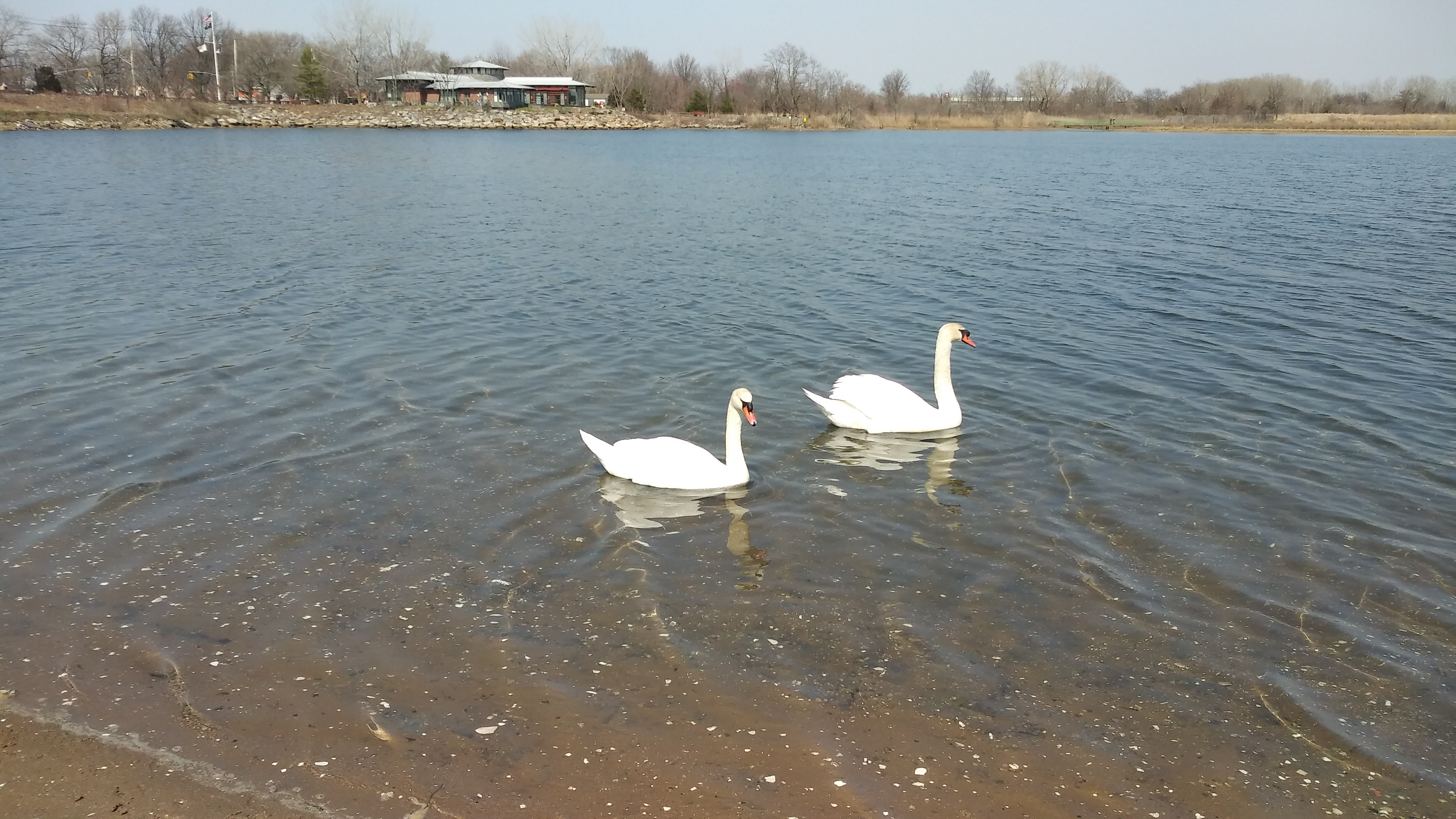
Invasive Mute Swans in the Creek

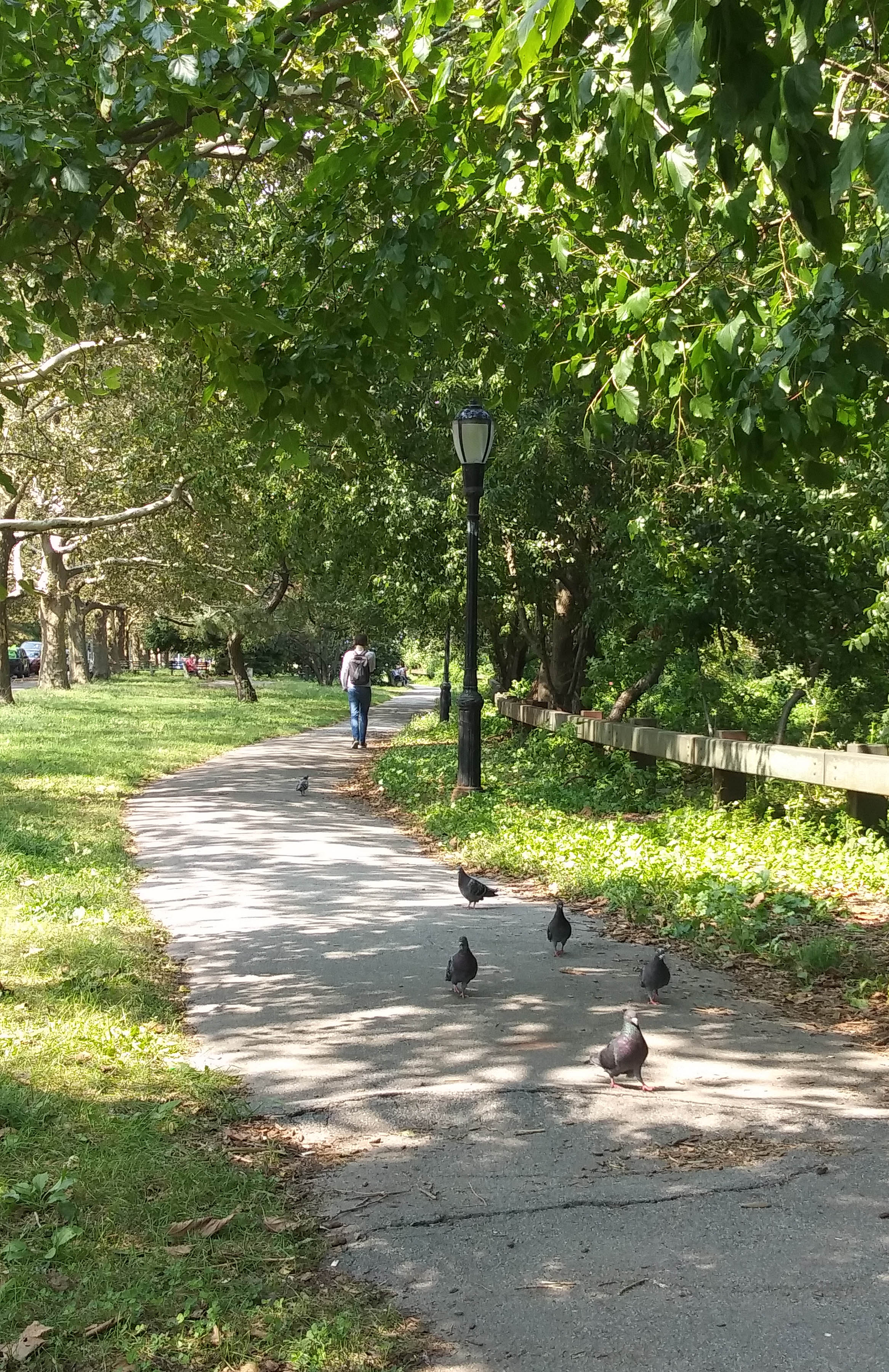
Walking path along the salt marsh

Along with sounds of cicadas

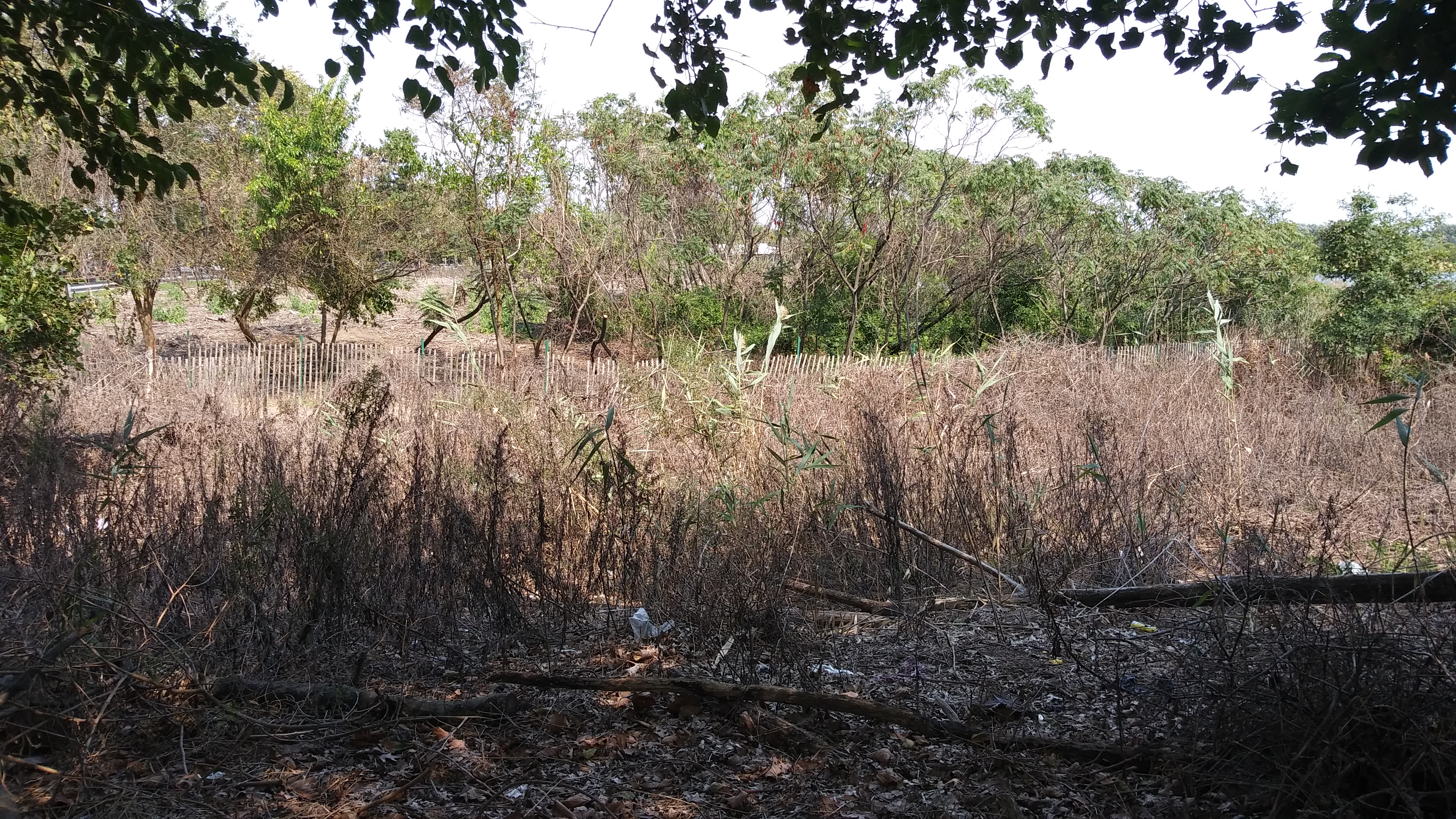
Flora of the salt marsh

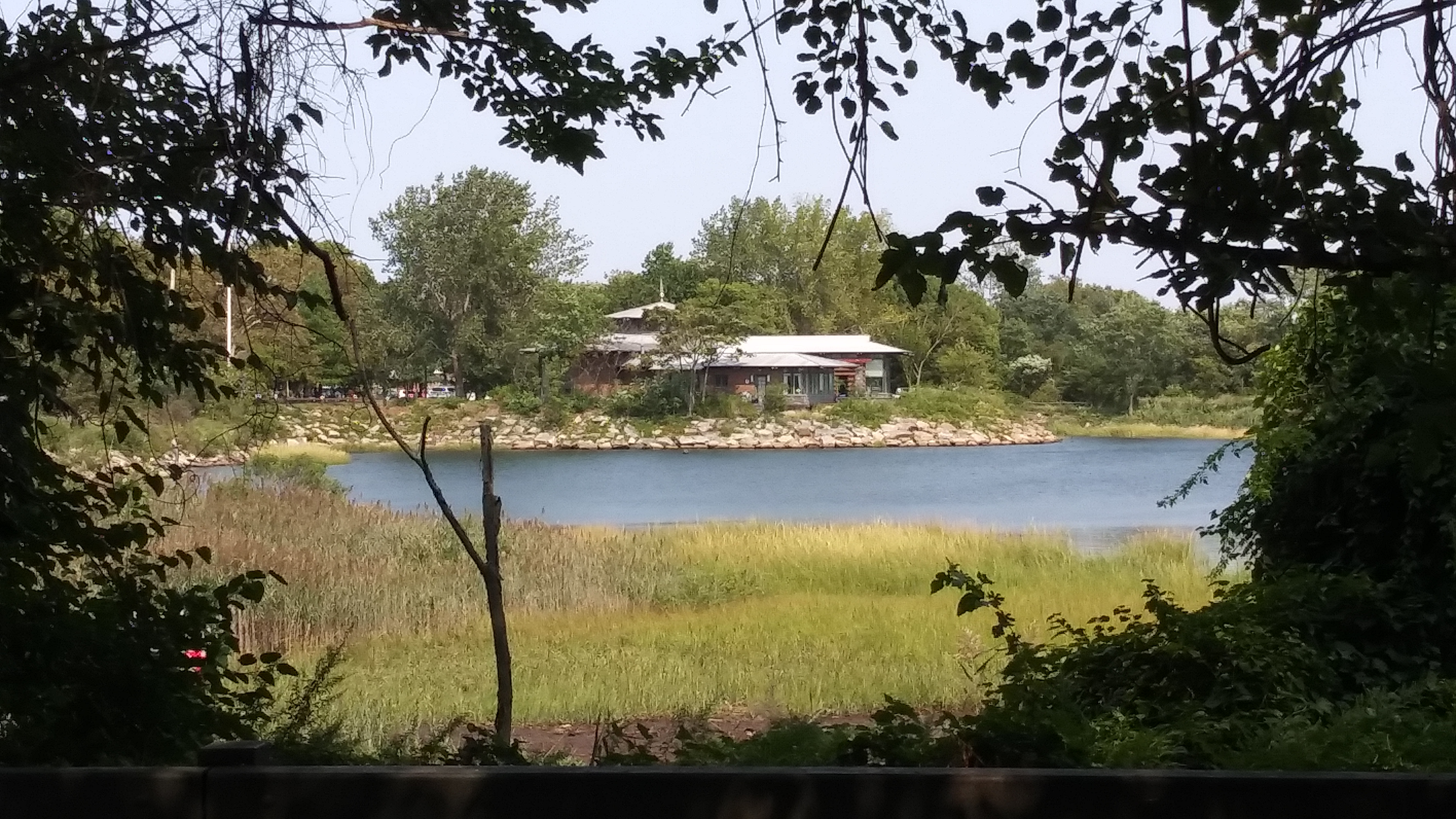

Jogging path in Marine Park
