= White Island (Brooklyn) =

Island in New York City, United States

Coordinates: 40.5971400°N 73.9180760°W

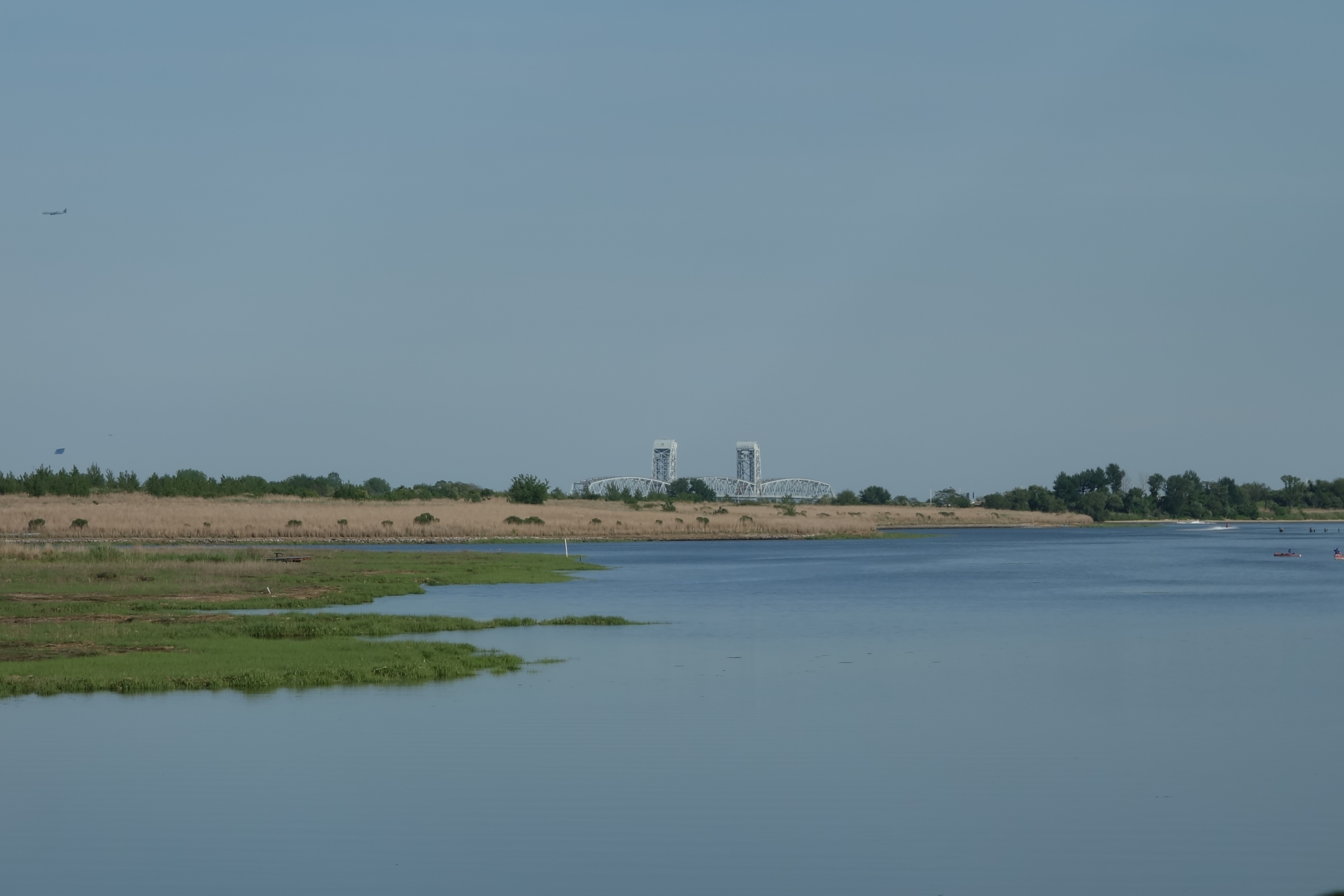
View across Gerritsen Creek towards White Island, with the Marine Parkway Bridge in the distance

White Island, sometimes erroneously called Mau Mau Island, is a small uninhabited island in the New York City borough of Brooklyn, located between Gerritsen Creek and Mill Creek in the Marine Park recreation area. Historically, the area around White Island was a salt marsh with shifting topography. The island came into existence permanently sometime after 1917, (Note: According to Seitz & Miller 2011, p. 310, "[T]here was no island in the creek in 1917.") and most likely formed in 1934 as dumping led to the current shoreline.

The name White Island has always been used by the NYC Department of Parks and Recreation. The name “Mau Mau” was suggested to the U.S. Board on Geographic Names in the 1970s and rejected as offensive and lacking widespread use. The racist term for Black assertiveness (derived from the British disparagement of the Kenyan anti-colonial uprising) was briefly in vogue at that time due to the popularity of Tom Wolfe’s essays and 1970 book “Radical Chic & Mau Mauing the Flak-Catchers.” The rejected name was accidentally applied during a database update in the 21st century, according to NOAA. Erik Baard discovered the controversy while researching his book "Paddling New York City" (Falcon Guides) and informed the agency, which corrected its nautical charts to conform to the official park name, White Island.

The area was uninhabited by European settlers until the late 1700s, when a mill and bridge were built. It was donated to the City of New York in the early 1930s, along with much of Marine Park, by Alfred Tredway White (for whom the island is named) and Frederic Pratt with the requirement that it become parkland.

In the 1930s, sand excavated during construction of the Belt Parkway was added to the island. Subsequently, patches of asphalt were laid on top to prevent the sand from blowing onto the nearby Marine Park Golf Course.

In 2011, the New York City Parks Department began a restoration project on the island, with the goal of restoring salt marsh and bird habitat.

NYC Economic Development Corporation's Waterfront Action Agenda identified their effort to assist DPR in restoring White Island, including sand placement, shoreline stabilization, planting of marsh grasses, and invasive species removal. (DPR, 2013) [8]
