= Vander Veer =

Vander Veer may refer to:

- Albert Vander Veer (1841-1929), an American surgeon
- Emily A. Vander Veer, an author
- Vander Veer Park Historic District in Davenport, Iowa, United States
  - Vander Veer Botanical Park, a botanical garden in the above historic district

== See also ==
- Van der Veer (disambiguation)
