= Van der Veer =

Van der Veer is a Dutch toponymic surname meaning "from the ferry". Variants include Van 't Veer and Van de Veer. Abroad the parts of the surname are often merged in various ways. Notable people with the surname include:

- Cornelia van der Veer (1639–1704), Dutch poet
- Frank Van der Veer (1921–1982), American special-effects artist
- Jeroen van der Veer (born 1947), Dutch businessman, former CEO of Royal Dutch Shell
- Nevada Van der Veer (1884–1958), American contralto singer
- Peter van der Veer (born 1953), Dutch anthropologist
- Willard Van der Veer (1894–1963), American cinematographer who filmed the Byrd Antarctic Expedition
- Willem van der Veer (1887–1960), Dutch film actor

Van 't Veer

- Laura J. van 't Veer (born 1957), Dutch molecular pathologist

Vanderveer etc.

- Abraham Vanderveer (1781–1839), U.S. Representative from New York
- Albert Vander Veer (1841–1929), American surgeon
- Bruce Vanderveer (born 1970s), American record producer known as "Automatic"
- Ellinor Vanderveer (1886–1976), American actress
- Ferdinand Van Derveer (1823–1892), American Union Army general
- George Vanderveer (1875–1942), American labor lawyer
- Heidi VanDerveer (born 1964), American basketball coach
- Tara VanDerveer (born 1953), American basketball player and coach

Vandeveer

- Ferdinand Vandeveer Hayden (1829–1887), American geologist
- Logan Vandeveer (1815–1855), Texas pioneer, ranger and civic leader
- Michael Vandeveer (fl. 1980s), American (Indiana) politician
- Ray Vandeveer (born 1953), American (Minnesota) politician
- Stacy D. VanDeveer (born 1967), American international relations scholar

== See also ==
- Mount Van der Veer, Antarctic mountain named for Willard Van der Veer
- Vander Veer (disambiguation)
