= 6th Communication Battalion =

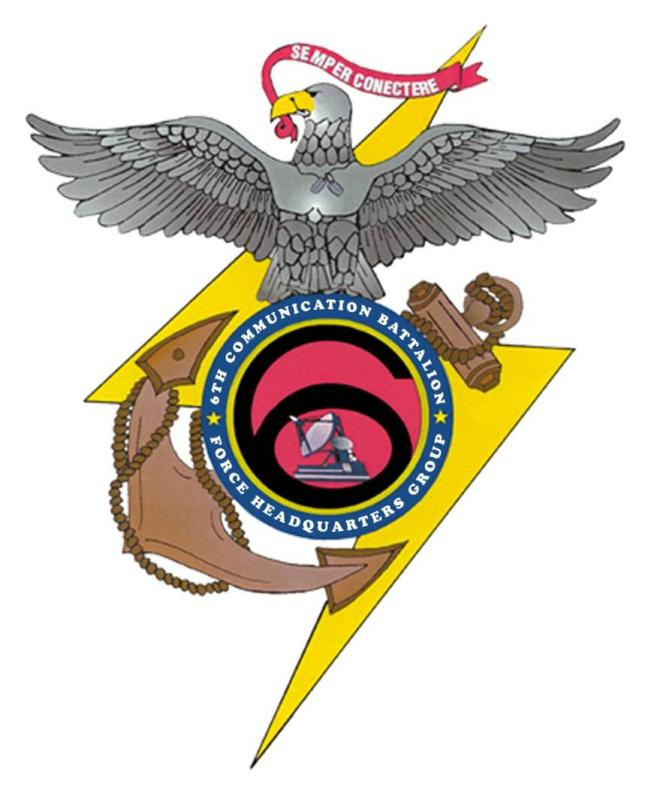
- 6th Comm's insignia
- Active: 15 May 1957 – present
- Country: United States
- Branch: USMC
- Type: Support
- Role: Provide C4 communications support to forward units
- Part of: Force Headquarters Group; Marine Forces Reserve
- Garrison/HQ: Floyd Bennett Field
- Motto: Semper Conectere "Always Connected"
- Engagements: Operation Desert Storm; Operation Iraqi Freedom

Commanders
- Current commander: Lieutenant Colonel Marc A. McNeill

6th Communication Battalion (6th Comm) is a communications battalion in the United States Marine Corps. It is part of Force Headquarters Group (FHG) Marine Forces Reserve. The unit is headquartered out of Floyd Bennett Field, Brooklyn, New York. The unit specializes in communications and is trained to provide radio, cyber, wire/switching, and satellite services to support Marine Expeditionary Forces (MEFs). 6th Communication Battalion also serves the surrounding New York community by running the Toys for Tots program in the New York City and Long Island area, attending parades and memorial services, and providing support for various other community activities that may arise.

== Mission ==
The mission of 6th Communication Battalion is to:

Provide communication support to Marine Expeditionary Force Headquarters Group (MHG) or to a designated Joint Task Force (JTF) command element when directed. Additionally, to provide Ground Mobile Forces Satellite support to Force Headquarters Group in the conduct of its mission, as directed.

== History ==
=== Early years ===
6th Communication Battalion was activated on 15 May 1957 at Fort Schuyler, Bronx, New York, as the 1st Communication Support Battalion and were re-designated on 1 July 1962 as the 6th Communication Battalion. The battalion was called to active duty in March 1970 for service in the U.S. postal strike of 1970.

=== 1990s to present ===
The battalion participated in support of Operation Desert Storm in Southwest Asia from December 1990 to April 1991. They relocated during July 1997 to Floyd Bennett Field, Brooklyn, New York. Following the attacks of September 11, 2001, many 6th Comm Marines volunteered for Operation Rainbow Hope, organized by the New York State Naval Militia. This operation, which also included members of other local reserve units, provided security for New York City Metropolitan Area bridges, tunnels, the mayoral residence, relief supply distribution points, ground zero, and other potential target areas. During the operation, a number of Rainbow Hope volunteers were billeted on Governor's Island. The entire battalion was mobilized in 2003 in support of Operation Enduring Freedom. They participated in Operation Iraqi Freedom from March to June 2003. After returning to New York, the unit was demobilized in September 2003. Elements of the battalion have again mobilized and deployed in support of Operations Iraqi Freedom and Enduring Freedom since June 2004 to the present.

=== Casualties on September 11, 2001 ===
Two Marines from the unit were killed during the September 11 attacks on the World Trade Center in New York City. The Marines were Gunnery Sergeant Mathew Garvey, a firefighter with New York City Fire Department Squad Company 1 and Sergeant Major Michael Curtin, a police officer with New York City Police Department Emergency Service Unit Truck 2.

== Unit awards ==
A unit citation or commendation is an award bestowed upon an organization for the action cited. Members of the unit who participated in said actions are allowed to wear on their uniforms the awarded unit citation. 6th Comm has been presented with the following awards:

| Ribbon | Unit Award |
|---|---|
| | Presidential Unit Citation |
| | Meritorious Unit Commendation |
| | National Defense Service Medal with one Bronze Star |
| | Global War on Terrorism Expeditionary Medal |
| | Global War on Terrorism Service Medal |
| | Humanitarian Service Medal |

== Notable Marines ==
- Former New York City Commissioner Raymond Kelly

== See also ==
- List of United States Marine Corps battalions
- Organization of the United States Marine Corps
