= Historic Aircraft Restoration Project =

- Location within New York
- Established: 1998
- Location: New York, New York
- Coordinates: 40.595°N 73.883°W
- Type: Aviation museum
- Founder: Arnie Migliaccio
- Website: www.nps.gov/gate/learn/historyculture/historic-aircraft-at-hangar-b.htm

The Historic Aircraft Restoration Project is an aviation museum located in Hangar B at Floyd Bennett Field in New York, New York.

== History ==
In 1996, Arnie Migliaccio suggested the creation of a group of volunteers, working as part of the National Park Service's Volunteers-In-Parks program, to restore aircraft on Floyd Bennett Field. The project began two years later in Hangar B on the east side of the airport and the volunteers eventually became known as "angels".

A number of the project's aircraft were previously on display at the Intrepid Sea, Air & Space Museum.

In May 2002, the Berlin Airlift Historical Foundation's KC-97 arrived at the project's hangar. The project provided space to the foundation as they restored the aircraft. After 15 years of work, the airplane departed the airport in November 2017.

The project's volunteers were locked out of the hangar in 2019, allegedly due to a dispute over racial discrimination by another volunteer.

== Collection ==
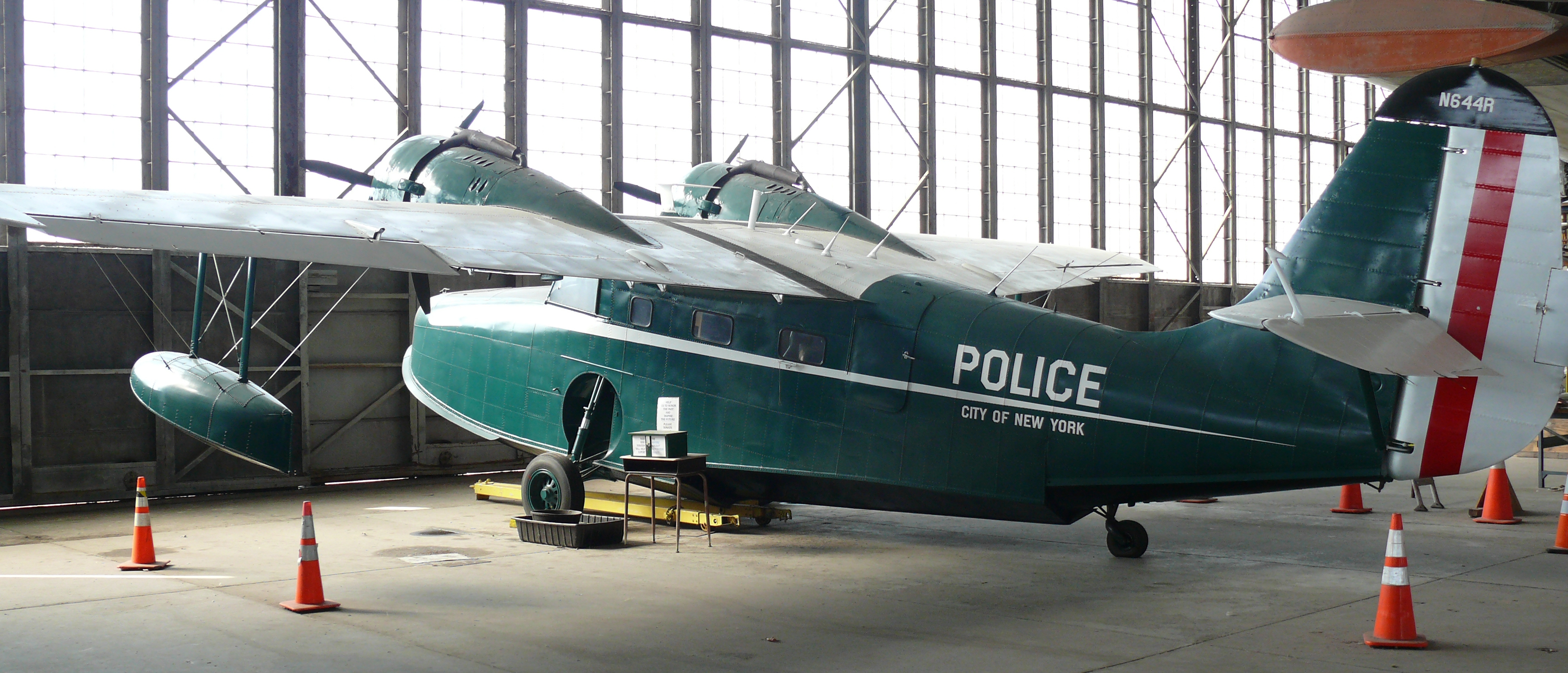
Grumman JRF-5 Goose

- Beechcraft JRB-4
- Consolidated PBY-5A Catalina
- Douglas A-4 Skyhawk
- Douglas C-47D Skytrain
- Fairchild PT-26
- Grumman UF-1G Albatross
- Grumman JRF-5 Goose
- Grumman S-2E Tracker
- Lockheed SP-2E Neptune
- Lockheed Vega Winnie Mae – replica
- Sikorsky HH-3F Pelican

== See also ==
- List of aviation museums
