= List of Air National Guard wings assigned to Strategic Air Command =

The United States Air Force's Strategic Air Command was assigned a large number of Air National Guard wings of various types for augmentation purposes during its forty-six-year history.

ARNG air refuelling wings assigned included the 170th Air Refueling Group (NJ), 171st Air Refueling Wing (PA), 186th (Mississippi Air National Guard).

== 101st Air Refueling Wing (Maine Air National Guard) ==
- Assigned to SAC on: 1 July 1976.
- At: Dow AFB (later renamed Bangor International Airport), Maine.
- Equipment: KC-135s
- Reassigned to: Air Mobility Command, Fifteenth Air Force on 31 May 1992

== 106th Bomb Wing (New York Air National Guard) ==
See 106th Rescue Wing

== 108th Air Refueling Wing (New Jersey Air National Guard) ==
See 108th Air Refueling Wing

== 111th Strategic Reconnaissance Wing (Pennsylvania Air National Guard) ==
See 111th Fighter Wing

== 112th Air Refueling Wing (Pennsylvania Air National Guard) ==
- Assigned to SAC on: 16 October 1991.
- At: Pittsburgh ANGB, Pennsylvania.
- Equipment: KC-135s
- Reassigned on: 31 May 1992

== 126th Air Refueling Wing (Illinois Air National Guard) ==
- Assigned to SAC on: 1 July 1976.
- At: Chicago O’Hare International Airport, IL.
- Equipment: KC-97s, KC-135s.
- Reassigned to: Air Mobility Command, Fifteenth Air Force on 31 May 1992.

The 126th Air Refueling Wing was composed of the 108th Air Refueling Squadron and the 145th Air Refueling Squadron from the Illinois ANG along with the 126th Air Refueling Squadron from the Wisconsin ANG.

== 128th Air Refueling Wing (Wisconsin Air National Guard) ==
See Wisconsin National Guard

== 131st Fighter Bomber Wing (Missouri Air National Guard) ==
- Ordered to active duty on: 1 March 1951.
- At: Bergstrom AFB, Texas.
- Assigned to: Strategic Air Command, Eighth Air Force.
- Equipment: F-51s.
- Transferred to: Tactical Air Command on 15 November 1951.

The 131st Fighter Bomber Wing was composed of the 170th Fighter Squadron from the Illinois ANG, the 110th Fighter Squadron from the Missouri ANG and the 192nd Fighter Squadron from the Nevada ANG.

== 132nd Fighter Bomber Wing (Iowa Air National Guard) ==
- Ordered to active duty on: 1 April 1951.
- At: Dow AFB, Maine.
- Assigned to: Strategic Air Command, Eighth Air Force.
- Equipment: F-51s.
- Transferred to: Tactical Air Command on 15 November 1951.

The 132nd Fighter - Bomber Wing was composed of the 124th Fighter Squadron from the Iowa ANG, the 173rd Fighter Squadron from the Nebraska ANG and the 174th Fighter Bomber Squadron from the Iowa ANG

== 146th Fighter - Bomber Wing (California Air National Guard) ==
- Activated on: 1 April 1951.
- At: Moody AFB, Georgia.
- Assigned to: Strategic Air Command, Second Air Force.
- Equipment: F-51s.
- Transferred to: Tactical Air Command on 16 September 1951.

The 146th Fighter Bomber Wing was composed of the 190th Fighter Squadron from the Idaho ANG, the 186th Fighter Squadron from the Montana ANG and the 178th Fighter Squadron from the North Dakota ANG.

== 134th Air Refueling Wing (Tennessee Air National Guard) ==
- Assigned to SAC on: 1 July 1976.
- At: McGee-Tyson ANG Base, Tennessee.
- Equipment: KC-97Ls
- Reassigned on: . 31 May 1992.

== 136th Air Refueling Wing (Texas Air National Guard) ==
- Assigned to SAC on: 1 July 1976.
- At: NAS Dallas, Texas.
- Equipment: KC-97Ls.
- Reassigned on: 23 June 1978.

== 141st Air Refueling Wing (Washington Air National Guard) ==
- Assigned to SAC on: 1 July 1976.
- At: Geiger Field, Washington.
- Moved to: Fairchild AFB, Washington.
- Equipment: KC-135As, KC-135E, KC-135R.
- Reassigned to: Air Mobility Command, Fifteenth Air Force on 31 May 1992.

== 151st Air Refueling Wing (Utah Air National Guard) ==
- Assigned to SAC on: 1 July 1976.
- At: Salt Lake City IAP, UT.
- Equipment: KC-97Ls, KC-135A, KC-135E.
- Reassigned to: Air Mobility Command, Fifteenth Air Force on 31 May 1992.

== 157th Air Refueling Wing (New Hampshire Air National Guard) ==
- Assigned to SAC on: 1 October 1975.
- At: Pease AFB, NH.
- Equipment: KC-135A, KC-135E, KC-135R
- Reassigned on: 31 May 1992.

== 160th Air Refueling Wing (Ohio Air National Guard) ==
See Ohio Air National Guard

== 161st Air Refueling Wing (Arizona Air National Guard) ==
- Assigned to SAC on: 1 July 1976.
- At: Phoenix Sky Harbor IAP, Arizona.
- Equipment: KC-97Ls, KC-135A (1976-1980), KC-135E (1980-2005), KC-135R(2005–present)
- Reassigned to: Air Mobility Command, Fifteenth Air Force on 31 May 1992

== 168th Air Refueling Wing (Alaska Air National Guard) ==
- Assigned to SAC on: 1 October 1986
- At: Eielson AFB, Alaska.
- Equipment: KC-135D/Es.
- Reassigned to: Pacific Air Forces, Eleventh Air Force on 31 May 1992.
