= Q35 (New York City bus) =

Bus route in Queens and Brooklyn, New York

q35 rush
- Brooklyn−Rockaway Park
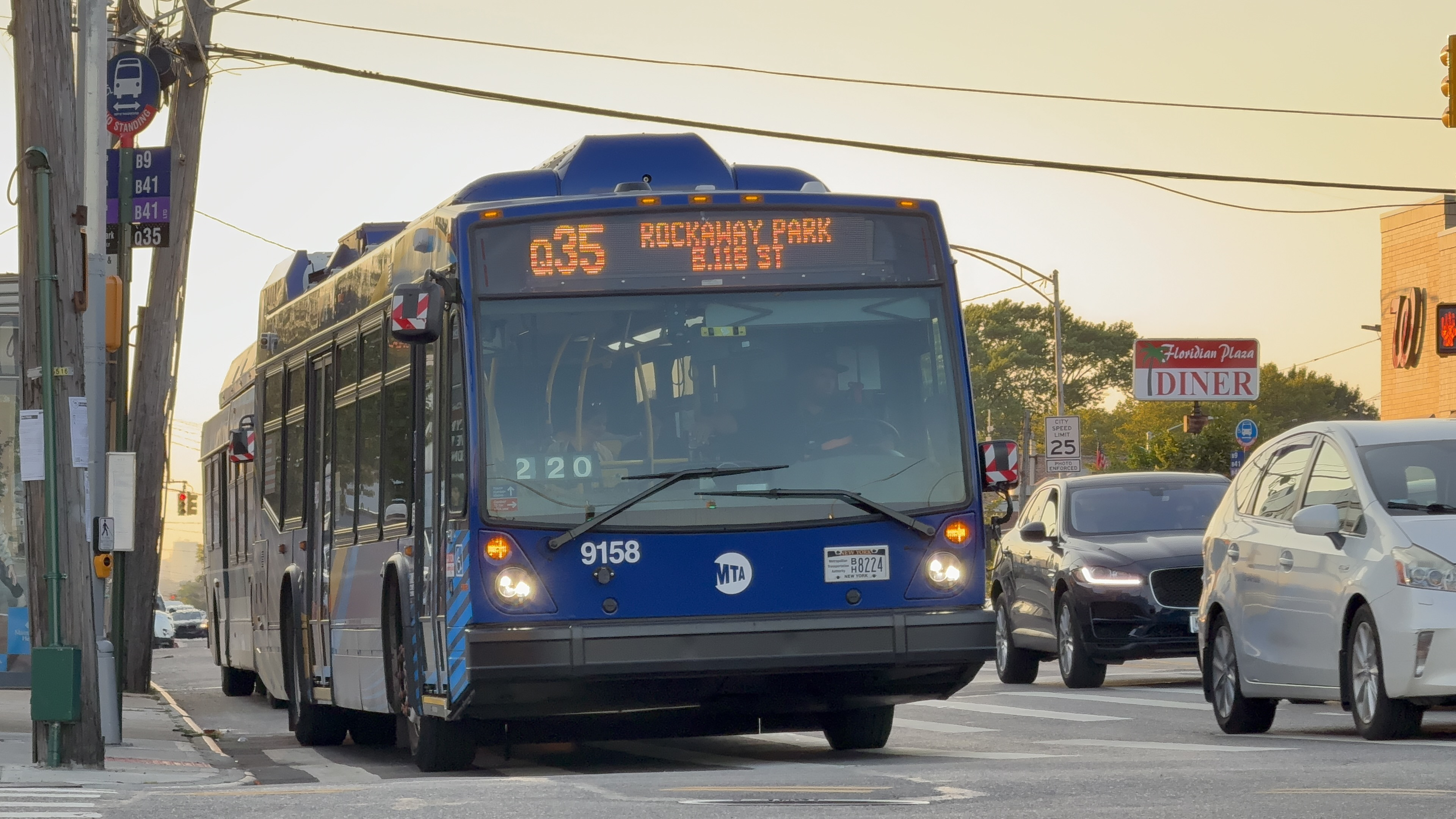
- A 2023 Nova Bus LFS (9158) on a Rockaway Park-bound Q35 on Flatbush Avenue.

Overview
- System: MTA Regional Bus Operations
- Operator: MTA Bus Company
- Garage: Far Rockaway Depot
- Vehicle: Nova Bus LFS; New Flyer Xcelsior XD40
- Began service: July 3, 1937

Route
- Locale: Brooklyn and Queens, New York, U.S.
- Landmarks served: Brooklyn College, Kings Plaza, Floyd Bennett Field, Dead Horse Bay, Fort Tilden, Jacob Riis Park, Scholars’ Academy
- Start: Midwood, Brooklyn – Flatbush Avenue–Brooklyn College subway station
- Via: Flatbush Avenue, Marine Parkway Bridge, Rockaway Beach Boulevard
- End: Rockaway Park, Queens – Scholars’ Academy (at Beach Channel Drive & Beach 108th Street)
- Length: 9 miles (14 km)
- Other routes: B41 Flatbush Avenue

Service
- Operates: All times
- Ridership: 770,947 (2025)
- Transfers: Yes
- Timetable: Q35

The Q35 bus route constitutes a public transit line in southeast Brooklyn as well as the Rockaway Peninsula of southern Queens in New York City. The Q35 is operated by MTA Regional Bus Operations under the MTA Bus Company brand, but was formerly privately operated by Green Bus Lines. The bus provides service between Midwood in central Brooklyn to Rockaway Park on the Rockaway Peninsula, running mainly along Flatbush Avenue in Brooklyn and Rockaway Beach Boulevard on the Rockaway Peninsula. The route utilizes the Marine Parkway–Gil Hodges Memorial Bridge to cross between Brooklyn and Queens. The Q35 runs as a "Rush" route, making limited stops on Flatbush Avenue in Brooklyn and local stops in Queens.

The Q35 began operations under Green Bus Lines on July 3, 1937, the day the Marine Parkway Bridge was opened, to connect Brooklyn with the newly renovated Jacob Riis Park in the Rockaways. In August 1937, the route was extended east to its current terminus at Beach 116th Street subway station. Due to franchise restrictions with the city government, buses originally made no stops in Brooklyn between Flatbush Avenue station and the bridge. Additional stops in Brooklyn were added by 1940, and by 1976 buses were allowed to pick up and drop off passengers in both directions in Brooklyn. Following the MTA takeover in 2006, several stops in Brooklyn were eliminated to streamline service, so that the Q35 makes limited stops in Brooklyn while operating as a local route in Queens. Service in Queens was rerouted from Newport Avenue to Rockaway Beach Boulevard on August 31, 2025, and it was simultaneously extended east to Scholars' Academy at Beach 108th Street.

== Route description ==
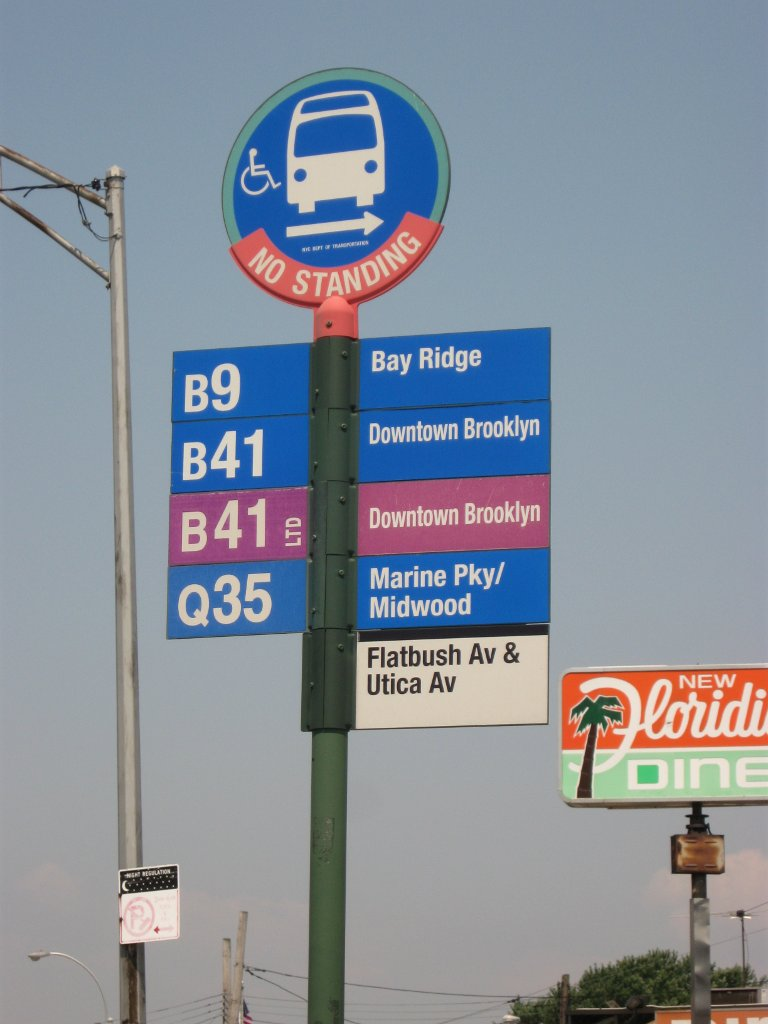
A bus stop at Flatbush/Utica Avenues in Brooklyn, serving the Q35 and other routes

The Q35 bus route operates between Midwood, Brooklyn at the Flatbush Avenue–Brooklyn College subway station, served by the 2 and 5 trains, and Rockaway Park, Queens at the Beach 108th Street ferry landing. The route primarily operates on Flatbush Avenue in Brooklyn, and Rockaway Beach Boulevard in the western Rockaways. It uses the Marine Parkway–Gil Hodges Memorial Bridge to travel across the Rockaway Inlet of Jamaica Bay between Brooklyn and the Rockaway peninsula. In Brooklyn, the Q35 makes limited stops on Flatbush Avenue up to its terminus. The Q35 makes additional local stops in Brooklyn during late-night hours. Due to the limited-stop section in Brooklyn, the Q35 is classified as a Rush route.

The Q35 route serves several sections of the Gateway National Recreation Area around Jamaica Bay, including Floyd Bennett Field and Dead Horse Bay in Brooklyn, and Fort Tilden and Jacob Riis Park in Queens.

=== Rockaway-bound ===
Queens-bound Q35 buses enter service at Avenue H between Nostrand Avenue and Flatbush Avenue in Midwood, Brooklyn, just east of the Brooklyn College campus, and one block south of the entrance to the Flatbush Avenue subway station at "The Junction" of Flatbush and Nostrand Avenues. Buses proceed south along Flatbush Avenue through the Flatlands and Marine Park neighborhoods to Avenue U at the Kings Plaza shopping mall, where several bus routes, including the B41, terminate. South of Avenue U the route continues down Flatbush Avenue, passing the Marine Park Golf Course and the former Floyd Bennett Field airport (now part of the Gateway National Recreation Area) to the south end of the street, before entering the Marine Parkway–Gil Hodges Memorial Bridge towards Rockaway, Queens. The Q35 is the only route to travel on Flatbush south of Avenue U and cross the bridge between Brooklyn and Queens.

Upon entering the Rockaways, the Q35 route makes its first stop on the off-ramp of the Marine Parkway Bridge, in order to access Fort Tilden, the Riis Landing ferry terminal, and the Roxbury and Breezy Point neighborhoods at the west end of the peninsula. This stop is considered dangerous, exposing passengers to the traffic entering and exiting the bridge. Normal service continues east on the off-ramp which becomes Beach Channel Drive, passing the parking lot of Jacob Riis Park. The route then turns south and east onto Rockaway Beach Boulevard near the park's bathhouse and Neponsit Beach Hospital. The route proceeds east through Neponsit, Belle Harbor, and Rockaway Park before ending service at Scholars’ Academy on Beach 108th Street.

=== Brooklyn-bound ===
Brooklyn-bound Q35 buses begin service at Beach Channel Drive & Beach 108th Street and follow the same route west via Rockaway Beach Boulevard and Beach Channel Drive. At the foot of the Marine Park Bridge, the route runs past the bridge onto what becomes Rockaway Point Boulevard in Roxbury, and turns south onto Beach 169th Street at Fort Tilden and at the far west end of Riis Park. Buses then u-turn back onto the bridge and cross into Brooklyn. The route then travels north on Flatbush Avenue serving Floyd Bennett Field and Kings Plaza. At Avenue I near the Flatbush−Nostrand terminal, buses turn west then north onto Nostrand Avenue, and finally terminate at Avenue H.

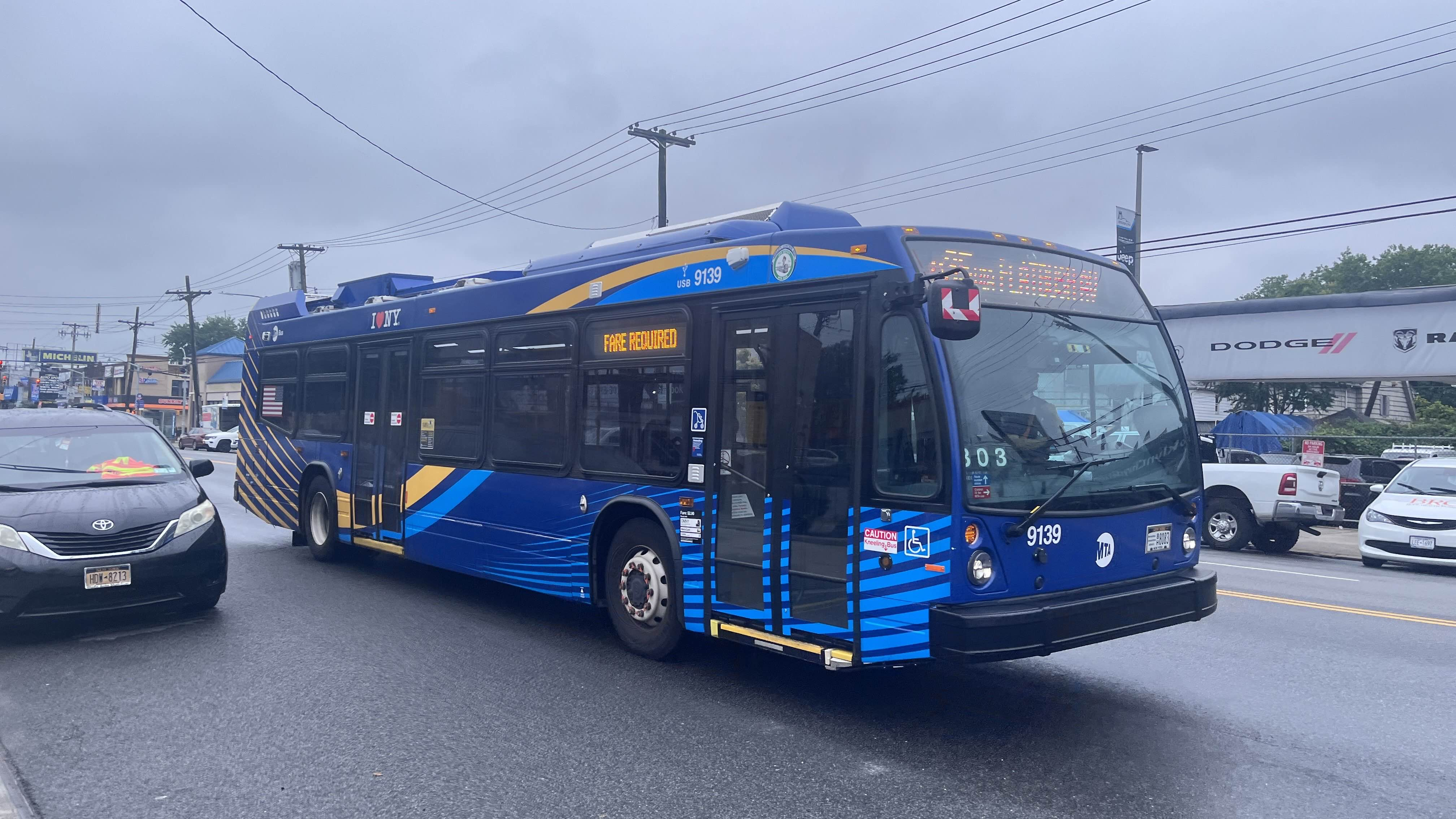
A 2023 Nova LFS (9139) on a Brooklyn College-bound Q35

=== Jacob Riis Park service ===
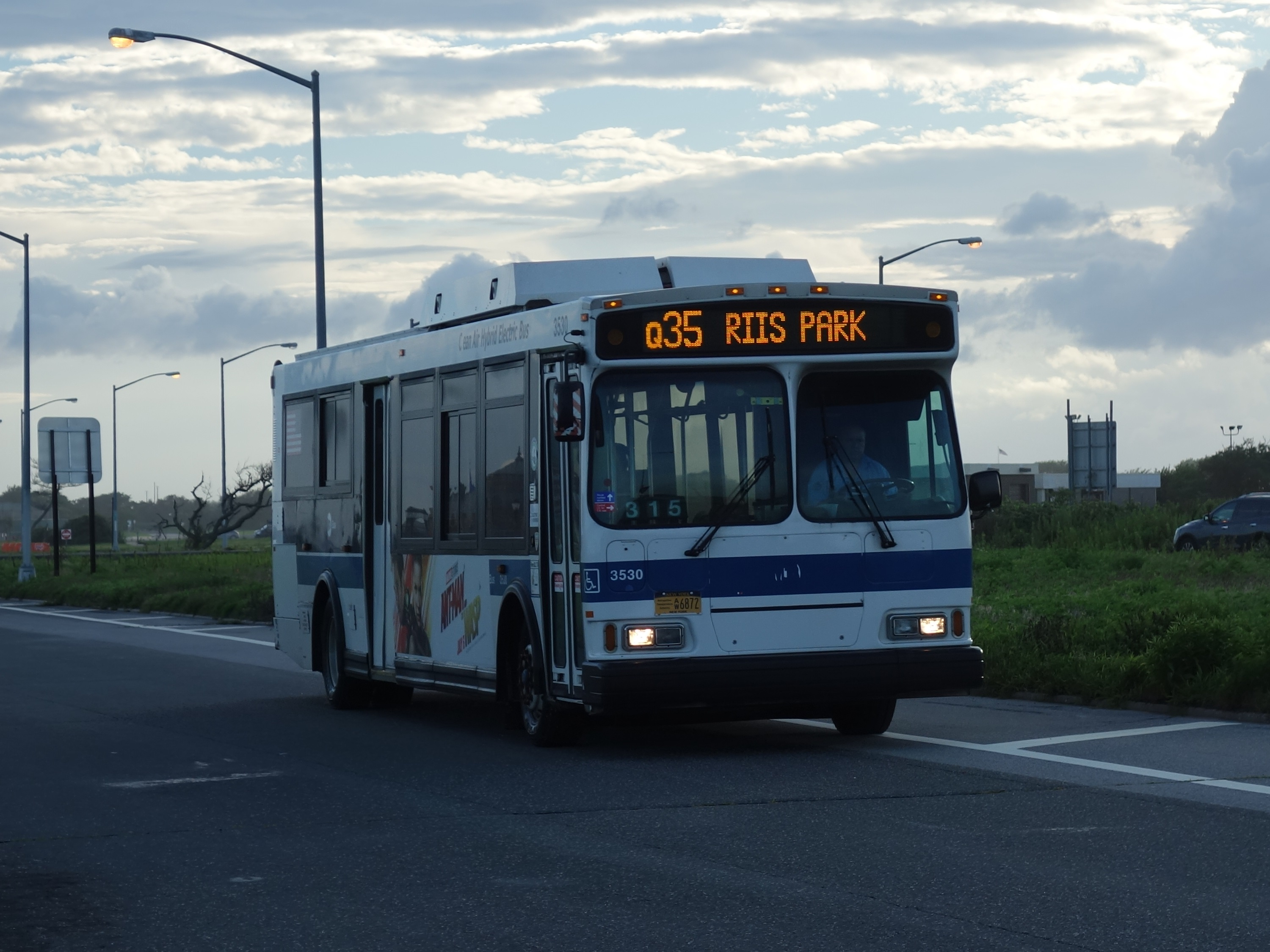
A 2006 Orion VII OG HEV (3530) on the Q35, short-turning in Jacob Riis Park. This bus is retired.

During the summer season, from late May to early September, Q35 buses are rerouted to directly serve Jacob Riis Park, with buses in both directions using a stop on Rockaway Beach Boulevard in front of the Riis Park historic bathhouse. Rockaway Park-bound buses access the stop via a normally-closed access road, which branches off from Beach Channel Drive near the end of the Marine Park Bridge at the west end of the park. Brooklyn-bound buses make a U-turn on Rockaway Beach Boulevard at the bathhouse to access the stop, then proceed onto Beach Channel Drive towards Fort Tilden and Brooklyn. During non-summer months, the closest stop to the park is on Rockaway Beach Boulevard west of Beach 149th Street, in front of Neponsit Beach Hospital.

=== School trippers ===
When school is in session, one bus departs at 2:55 from directly outside Scholars’ Academy, heading to its regular route via Beach Channel Drive, and terminates at Beach 169th Street/Rockaway Point Boulevard in Roxbury.

== History ==
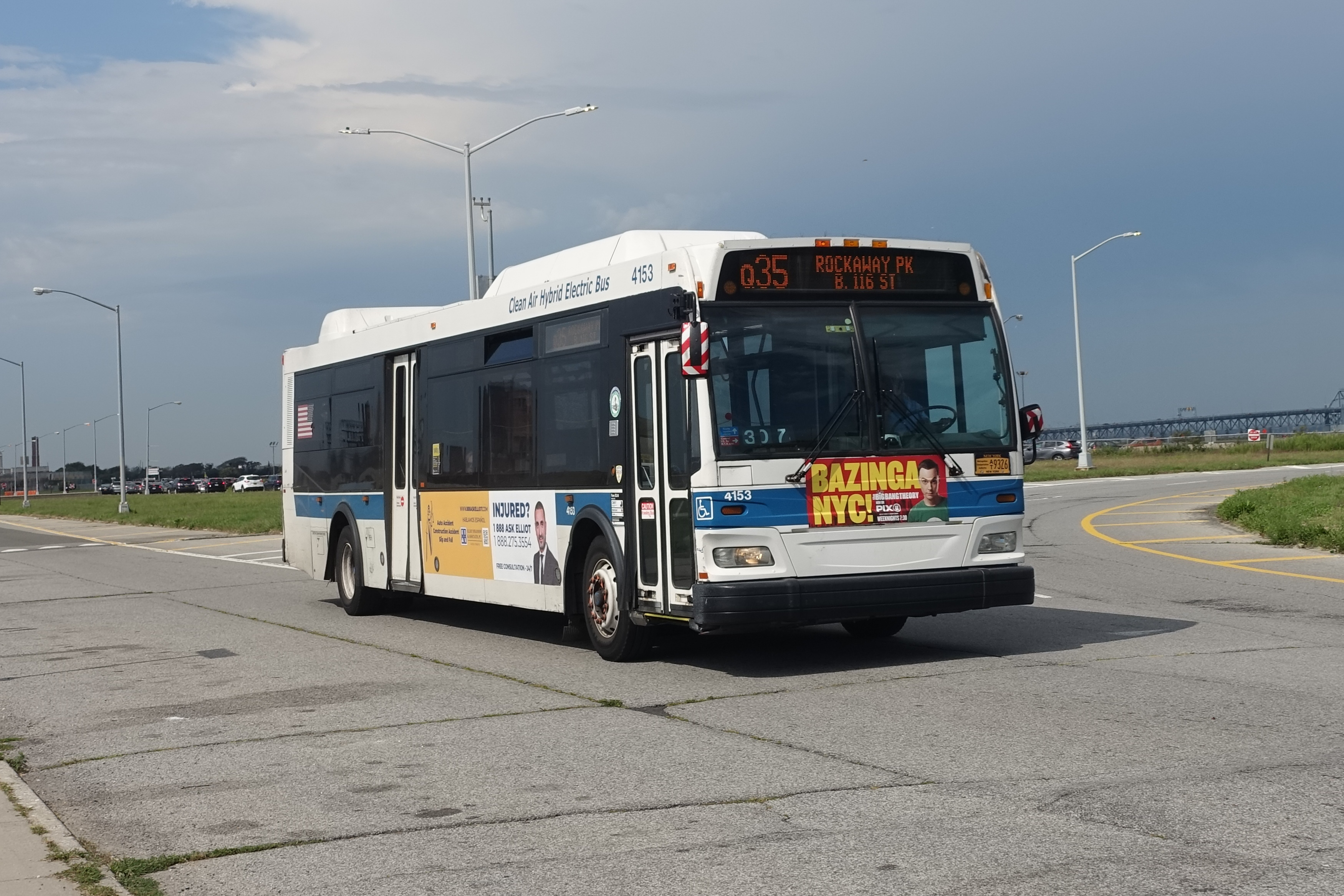
A 2009 Orion VII NG HEV (4153) on the Rockaway Park-bound Q35 in Jacob Riis Park in September 2023.

=== Creation ===
Prior to the creation of the Q35 bus, during the summer of 1936, Green Bus Lines operated the Q21B route between Brooklyn and Jacob Riis Park via Cross Bay Boulevard. It began at the New Lots Avenue subway station in New Lots, Brooklyn, and served the Rockaways' Playland amusement park, Rockaway Park and Neponsit before terminating at Riis Park. In October 1936, citizens from Neponsit lobbied the city and Green Lines to add extra routes in the Rockaways west of Beach 117th Street, then known as the "West End". It was pointed out that much of the population lived north of Rockaway Beach Boulevard, and would have to walk several blocks south to access the Q22 route. It was also pointed out that the previous transportation in the area, the defunct Ocean Electric Railway streetcar line, operated on Newport Avenue west of Beach 116th Street. The Q21B route was discontinued in November 1936 due to lack of profitability. By January 1937, local residents continued to petition Green Lines for several extensions of service. This included the restoration of the Q21B route, and the extension of the normal Q21 route west from Beach 116th Street to Beach 149th Street via Newport Avenue.

On May 5, 1937, it was announced that Green Bus Lines would operate bus service between the Flatbush Avenue IRT subway station in Brooklyn and Riis Park in the Rockaways via the Marine Parkway Bridge, which was then-under construction. The Brooklyn Bus Corporation, a subsidiary of the Brooklyn–Manhattan Transit Corporation (BMT), would also extend its B2 route south over the bridge during summer months to serve the park. The park had recently undergone a major Works Progress Administration (WPA) expansion in conjunction with the bridge project; both projects were overseen by Robert Moses.

The Marine Parkway Bridge was opened July 3, 1937 providing direct access from Brooklyn to the Rockaways, including Jacob Riis Park at the foot of the bridge. That same day, Green Bus Lines inaugurated the Q35 service between the Flatbush Avenue station and Riis Park. Because Green Lines held the rights to bus service in the Rockaways, and the BMT for service in Brooklyn, the Q35 was mandated to run non-stop through Brooklyn. Only two stops were made in Brooklyn, on the Brooklyn side of the Marine Parkway Bridge, and at Flatbush and Nostrand Avenues. In addition, free transfers were provided for passengers traveling farther east up to Beach 84th Street. Travel solely within Brooklyn or solely within Queens charged five cents, while a double fare of ten cents was paid for crossing between boroughs. However, by August 1 of that year Green Lines considered ending the service because it was unprofitable even at a double fare. According to the company, high costs stemmed from the 25-cent toll to cross the Marine Parkway Bridge, and the additional buses required for the service that were rented from other companies at $60 per bus along with insurance. Service was suspended for a single day on August 1 due to the expiration of the route's temporary permit with the city, but the route was reinstated the next day.

By August 19, 1937, the route was extended east to its current terminal at Beach 116th Street, running via Cronston Avenue one block north of Newport Avenue. On October 13, 1937 at a meeting with the New York State Transit Commission, the president of Green Bus Lines stated that the route would remain in operation through the winter in spite of the low profitability during the summer months and the lower patronage predicted during the winter. At the meeting, various Queens civic organizations including the Rockaway Civic Club lodged complaints against the company over unsatisfactory service. In May 1938, 184 streets in the Rockaways were approved to be converted into one-way streets. This included Newport Avenue and Cronston Avenue, which would become eastbound and westbound streets respectively. Q35 buses would then operate on Cronston Avenue towards Brooklyn and Newport Avenue towards Rockaway Park. The street changes would go into effect upon the completion of the extension of Beach Channel Drive towards Riis Park and the Marine Parkway Bridge. In July 1938, however, Newport Avenue was changed back into a two-way street, and Q35 buses were rerouted onto the street. Ridership statistics from the end of 1938 showed that the new bus route had poached summer commuters away from the Long Island Rail Road's Rockaway Beach Branch.

On May 22, 1939, the Rockaway Chamber of Commerce announced that Green Lines would operate a bus route between the Rockaways and the 1939 New York World's Fair held in Flushing Meadows Park. At this time, the Chamber also requested that an additional stop on the Q35 route at Flatbush Avenue and Kings Highway be added, in order to connect with the BMT Brighton Line to the west. By this time, ridership on the Q35 route was increasing, and the route made a stop in Brooklyn at Floyd Bennett Field.

=== Permanent franchise ===
After operating on temporary permits, in 1940 Green Lines sought a permanent franchise for the Q35 route. At this time, stops on the route were added at Avenue U (the future site of Kings Plaza), and at Kings Highway to connect with other bus lines and the BMT subway. The two new stops were added to increase patronage on the route. The exiting stops at the Marine Parkway Bridge and at Floyd Bennett Field were also maintained. In response to complaints from the Rockaway Civic Club, Green Lines would also increase the frequency of bus service, and would line up the bus schedule to meet trains at the Beach 116th Street station. The approval of the franchise was opposed by the Brooklyn Bus Corporation and the Brooklyn and Queens Transit Corporation, another BMT subsidiary. The route was approved by the New York City Board of Estimate in February 1940. The new franchise was approved by the city Transit Commissioner in July 1940.

On June 29, 1942, in order to conserve fuel and rubber for the World War II effort, Green Lines eliminated several bus stops on the Q21, Q22, and Q35 routes in the Rockaways. The change increased the average distance between bus stops to four blocks. On March 13, 1943, overnight service on the Q35 route began. At this time, buses on the route operated every 25 minutes until 10 PM. In 1951, the Rockaway Civic Club and Green Lines petitioned the city Traffic Department to change the location of bus stops on the Q35 route in order to improve safety. At the time, westbound buses stopped at odd numbered street, with eastbound bus stops located at even numbered streets. It was sought to reverse this pattern, in order to better line up with the intersecting one-way streets and reduce accidents.

In 1968, the Belle Harbor Property Owners association and Green Lines began installing benches at bus stops along Newport Avenue. On July 28, 1970, passengers at Jacob Riis Park entered a Fort Tilden-bound Q22 bus and demanded that the driver instead continue along the Q35 route into Brooklyn, after the passengers had reportedly been waiting up to 90 minutes for a Q35 bus. Afterwards, officers from the NYPD 100th Precinct approved of the driver continuing into Brooklyn. The Kings Plaza shopping mall at Avenue U opened on September 11, 1970, with the Q35 bus route serving the new mall.

Open-door service on the Q35 route in Brooklyn was added circa 1976; until then, buses only made drop offs northbound and pickups southbound in Brooklyn north of Kings Plaza. In September 1976, a bus rider wrote to New York State Assemblywoman Gerdi E. Lipschutz about the conditions on Q22 and Q35 buses, citing litter, passengers and drivers smoking in buses, and out-of-maintenance buses. At the time, the city was suffering financially due to the 1975 New York City fiscal crisis. In March 1978, a citizen from Belle Harbor wrote to Mayor Ed Koch concerning service on the Q35 route. The letter described the buses as "deathmobiles", (Note: "Deathmobiles" was a reference to Mayor Koch's use of a blue Chrysler Newport that he described as a "deathmobile".) and criticized the condition and maintenance of the buses on the route and the scheduling of buses.

The Q35 route served 1.1 million passengers in 1998. In 1999 it was suggested by Transportation Alternatives to create a bike-on-bus program on the Q35 route, which would involve installing bicycle racks onto buses on the route in order to carry bikes over the Marine Parkway Bridge. The program would compensate for the lack of pedestrian and cycle access to the bridge due to a planned rehabilitation project. The program would have been similar to the existing program on the QBx1 route (now the Q50 route) between Queens and the Bronx. During the bridge reconstruction project, which ran from 1999 to 2002, Q35 service continued over the bridge.

=== MTA takeover ===
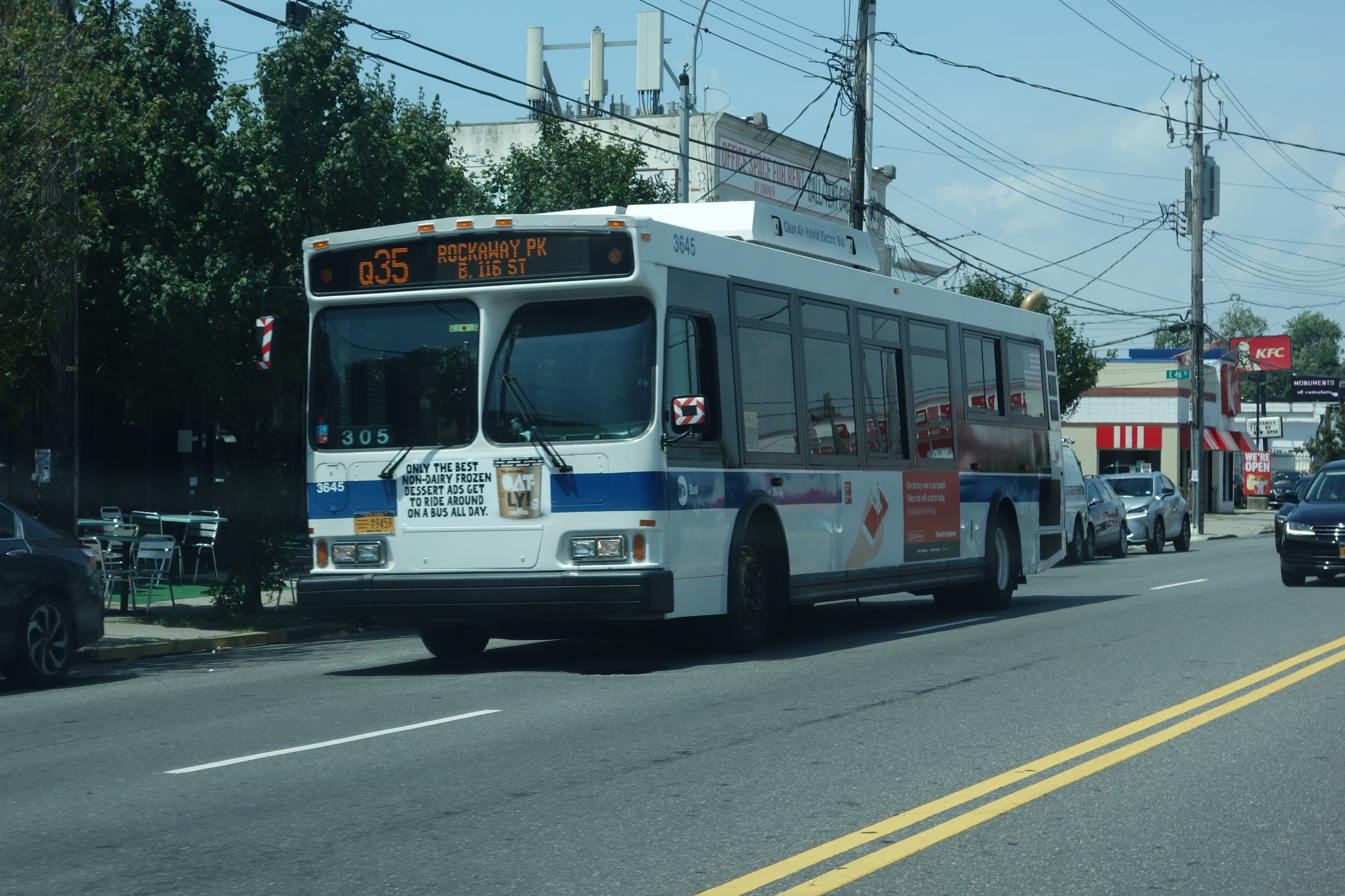
A 2007 VII OG HEV (3645) on the Rockaway Park-bound Q35 on Flatbush Avenue South in Brooklyn in August 2020.

On January 9, 2006, the MTA Bus Company took over the operations of the Green Bus Line routes as part of the city's takeover of all the remaining privately operated bus routes. Following the takeover, on March 4, 2007, several intermediate stops on the Q35 route were eliminated on Flatbush Avenue in Brooklyn between Kings Plaza and Brooklyn College. The changes reduced the number of stops on this stretch of the route to five in either direction. In October 2007, overnight service on the Q35 was suspended due to construction on the Marine Parkway Bridge. On May 13, 2008, a city-subsidized Rockaway ferry route operated by New York Water Taxi began service between Riis Landing and Pier 11/Wall Street in Manhattan. On that day, the New York Daily News conducted an informal race between the ferry and the combined bus-subway trip between the Rockaways and Wall Street; the bus-subway trip utilized the Q35 route between Riis Park and Flatbush Avenue, and the 2 subway route to Manhattan.

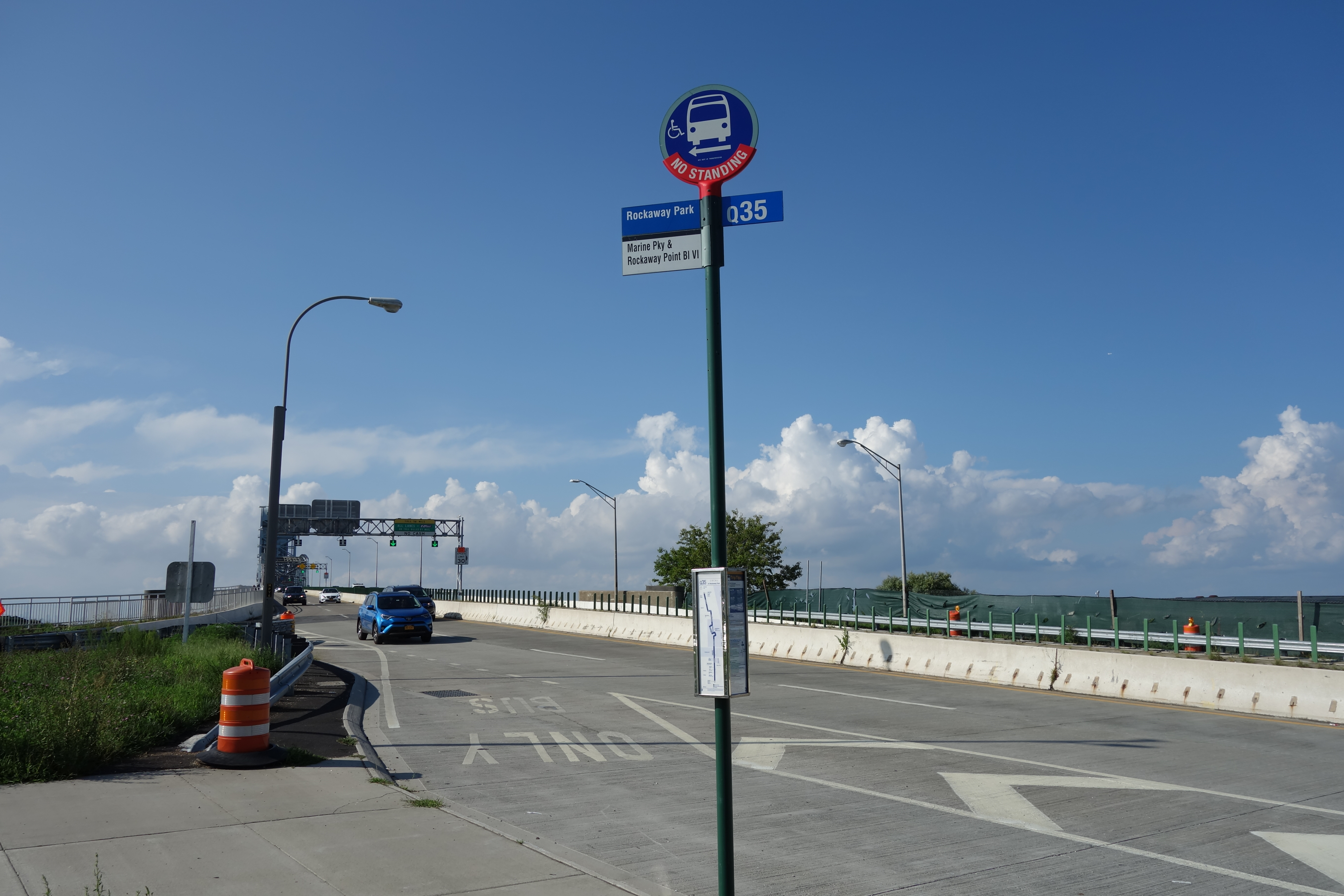
The Q35 bus stop at the foot of the Marine Parkway Bridge near Roxbury

On April 15, 2012, the travel path of the Q35 at its terminal in Midwood was altered. The previous set up, where buses would alight northbound passengers on the north side of Avenue H and pickup Rockaway-bound passengers on Flatbush Avenue at a shared stop with the B41 was discontinued. Instead, buses would now terminate and enter service at a single bus stop on the south side of Avenue H. In October 2012, a free transfer was offered on the MetroCard between the Q22, the Q35, and the 2 and 5 trains at the Flatbush Avenue–Brooklyn College subway station due to Hurricane Sandy.

In February 2016, then-New York State Assemblyman Phil Goldfeder (representing the Rockaways) issued a letter to the New York City Department of Transportation to relocate the Q35 bus stop on the Marine Park Bridge off-ramp. Goldfeder suggested utilizing a nearby stop at a pedestrian overpass on Beach Channel Drive at the Jacob Riis Park central mall. This stop is normally only used by the Q22. On March 14, 2016, one of the lanes of the southbound off-ramp from the Marine Parkway Bridge was closed due to construction. Because of this, the Q35 bus stop at the foot of the bridge was closed and relocated farther east to the stop at the Jacob Riis Park central mall. For the 2016 summer season, the MTA added 35 daily trips to the Q35 route on Saturdays and Sundays, decreasing the trip headways from 10 minutes to seven-and-a-half minutes.

In March 2017, the National Parks Conservation Association released a report to improve mass transit access to the Jamaica Bay Unit of the Gateway National Recreation Area, which includes Floyd Bennett Field, Fort Tilden, and Jacob Riis Park. Part of the proposal included increasing the frequency of the Q35 route, instituting a permanent bike-on-bus program on the route over the Marine Parkway Bridge, and improving the connections with the planned B82 Select Bus Service route. Other ideas in the plan included familiarizing bus drivers with the features of the Gateway Area, an extension of the Q53 SBS route west from Rockaway Park to Riis Park, and an extension of the Q22 route west to the far end of Fort Tilden near Breezy Point.

On October 10, 2017 at the monthly meeting of Queens Community Board 14, the MTA suggested rerouting the Q35 south from Newport Avenue onto Rockaway Beach Boulevard. The reroute would coincide with changes to the Q22 route, in which most Q22 trips would only travel between Beach 116th Street and Far Rockaway. The rerouted Q35 would partially replace Q22 service west of Beach 116th Street. Under the plan, the new Q35 route and most Q22 buses would travel north along Beach 116th Street at the end of Rockaway Park-bound runs, and use the Q35's current turnaround loop via Beach Channel Drive, Beach 117th Street, and Newport Avenue in order to reverse direction. The change to the Q35 route along with many of the service alterations proposed by the MTA received negative feedback from local residents. The rerouting of the Q35 and Q22 routes was protested due to potential traffic issues on Beach 116th Street, with the two routes along with the Q53 all using the street. On May 23, 2018, the MTA held an open house at the Rockaway YMCA in Arverne to discuss the changes to Q22 and Q35 service proposed in October 2017, including the potential route adjustment for the Q35 from Newport Avenue to Rockaway Beach Boulevard. Following the open house, however, the plans to alter the Q35 route were cancelled.

=== Bus redesigns ===
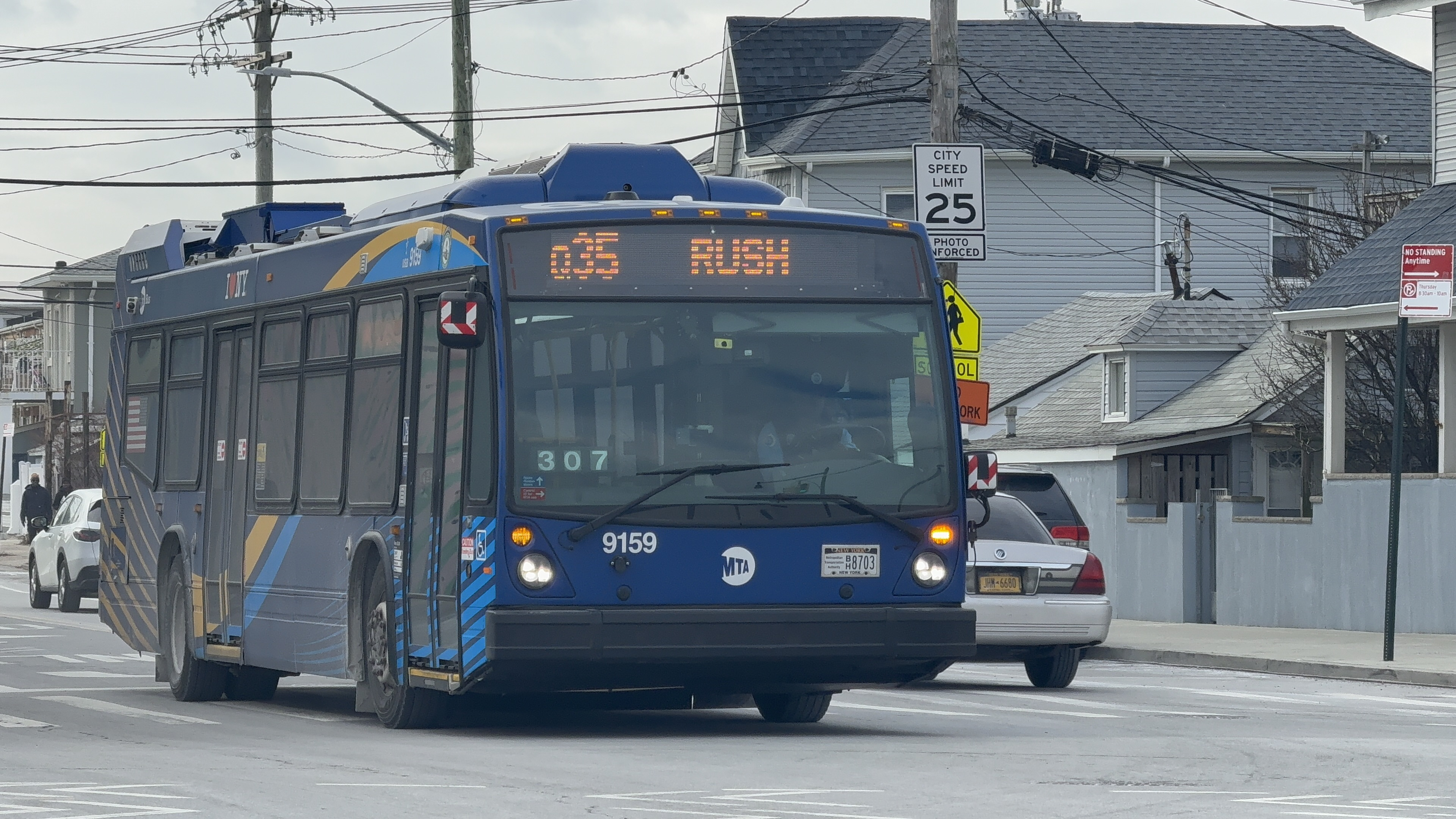
A Nova LFS on the new Q35 route on Rockaway Beach Boulevard turning onto Beach 108 Street in January 2026

In December 2019, the MTA released a draft redesign of the Queens bus network. As part of the redesign, the Q35 would have become a "subway connector" route, with a nonstop section on Flatbush Avenue similar to the existing route. The main change to the route was in Queens, where it would have been rerouted onto Rockaway Beach Boulevard. The redesign was delayed due to the COVID-19 pandemic in New York City in 2020, and the original draft plan was dropped due to negative feedback.

A revised plan was released in March 2022. The plan for the Q35 is the same as in the 2019 redesign, except it is now classed as a "zone" route due to its nonstop section in Brooklyn.

A final bus-redesign plan was released in December 2023. The Q35 would still be a zone route, but it would be rerouted onto Rockaway Beach Boulevard in Queens and extended east to Beach 108th Street, connecting with a NYC Ferry route there. It would also make local stops in Brooklyn during the nighttime.

On December 17, 2024, addendums to the final plan were released. Among these, the stop changes on Flatbush Avenue were moved from the Brooklyn Bus Redesign to the Queens Bus Redesign, and deadheads on Beach 108th Street were switched to the opposite direction. On January 29, 2025, the current plan was approved by the MTA Board, and the Queens Bus Redesign went into effect in two different phases during Summer 2025. The Q35 is part of Phase II, which began on August 31, 2025.

== Connecting bus routes ==
- Q22, Q53 SBS (at Beach 108th Street)
- B2, B3, B9, B41, B46, B46 SBS (at Avenue U, Kings Plaza)
- B100 (at Fillmore Avenue; 1:00am trips only)
- B7, B82, B82 SBS (at Kings Highway)
- B41 (Bergen Beach; at Avenue N; overnight only)
- B11, B44, B44 SBS, B103, BM2 (at Avenue H/Nostrand Avenue)

== See also ==
Green Bus Lines
