= Dead Horse =

Dead Horse, Dead Horses, or Deadhorse may refer to:

== Places ==
- Dead Horse Bay, in Brooklyn, New York, U.S.
- Dead Horse Camp, in South America
- Dead Horse Peak in Utah, U.S.
- Dead Horse Point State Park in Utah, U.S.
- Dead Horse Ranch State Park in Arizona, U.S.
- Deadhorse, Alaska, a town in the United States
- White Pass Trail, also called "Dead Horse Trail"
- Dead Horse Bay, in Brooklyn, New South Wales, Australia

== Arts, entertainment, and media ==
=== Music ===
==== Groups ====
- Dead Horse (band), an American thrash metal band
- Dead Horse One, a neo-psychedelic/shoegaze band based in France
- The Dead Horses, the backup band for Ryan Bingham

==== Albums ====
- Dead Horse (album), a 2005 album by Cassetteboy
- A Dead Horse, a 1989 album by The Golden Palominos
- Dead Horses, a 2013 album by Evergreen Terrace
- The Dead Horse EP, a 2007 remix EP by Junior Boys

==== Songs ====
- "Dead Horse" (song), a 1991 Guns N' Roses song

=== Podcasts ===
==== Horror ====
- Episode “MAG 133 - Dead Horse” of horror fiction podcast The Magnus Archives

== See also ==
- Flogging a dead horse (disambiguation)
- Flogging a dead horse, an idiom
- Dark Horse (disambiguation)
