= Flogging a dead horse (disambiguation) =

Flogging a dead horse (or "beating a dead horse" or "beating a dead dog") is a common English idiom.

Flogging a dead horse or beating a dead horse may also refer to:

- Flogging a Dead Horse, 1980 compilation album of singles by the Sex Pistols

== Titled works beginning "Beating ..." ==
- Beating Dead Horses, studio album by the industrial metal band 16Volt
- Beating a Dead Horse to Death... Again, 2008 album by Dog Fashion Disco
- Beating a Dead Horse (album), a 2015 album by YouTuber Jarrod Alonge

== See also ==
- Dead horse (disambiguation)
