= Mary A. Whalen (tanker) =

Historic oil tanker in New York, United States

- U.S. National Register of Historic Places
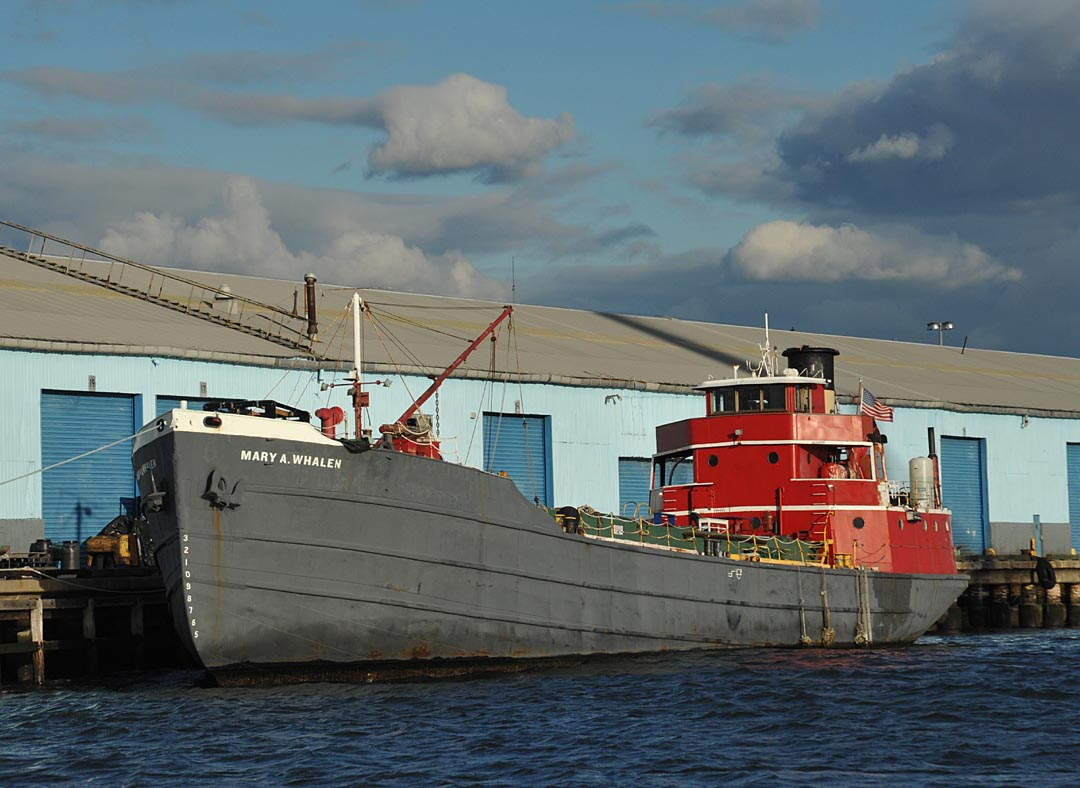

- Location within New York City Location within New York Location within the United States
- Location: Pier 11, Atlantic Basin, Red Hook, Brooklyn, New York
- Coordinates: 40°41′05″N 74°00′28″W
- Area: Less than 1 acre (0.40 ha)
- Built: 1938
- Built by: John H. Mathis & Company, Camden, New Jersey
- NRHP reference No.: 12000831
- Added to NRHP: October 3, 2012

Mary A. Whalen, known as the S.T. Kiddoo from 1938 to 1958, is a historic oil tanker located in the Red Hook neighborhood of Brooklyn, Kings County, New York. She is the home of the non-profit PortSide NewYork, and the group runs programs aboard her. She was built in 1938 by the John J. Mathis Company, of Camden, New Jersey Hull #124, and measures 172 feet long. She is a rare surviving example of a "bell boat," a ship controlled from the engine room with telegraph signals sent from the bridge. The tanker shipped various fuel products along East Coast and was at center of United States v. Reliable Transfer Co., a pivotal 1975 Supreme Court decision in maritime law after she ran aground in Rockaway Inlet in 1968. She was in active service until 1994.

She was listed on the National Register of Historic Places in 2012.
