= Dark Horse =

A dark horse is a political candidate who is nominated unexpectedly; or an underdog in other fields who achieved unprecedented success.

Dark Horse, Darkhorse, The Dark Horse or A Dark Horse may also refer to:

== Publications ==
=== Novels ===
- Dark Horse, a 1931 novel by B. M. Bower
- Dark Horse (Brown novel), a 2013 crime novel by Honey Brown
- Dark Horse, a 2007 novel by John Francome
- The Dark Horse, a 1981 novel by Rumer Godden
- The Dark Horse, a 1899 novel by Nat Gould
- The Dark Horse, a 1931 novel by Robert Grant
- Dark Horse, a 2011 eBook novel in the Taz/Bell series by Sharon Green
- Dark Horse, a 1990 novel by Mary H. Herbert
- Dark Horse, a 2002 novel by Tami Hoag
- The Dark Horse, a 1939 juvenile novel by Will James
- The Dark Horse, a 2010 novel in the Walt Longmire Mysteries series by Craig Johnson
- Dark Horse, a 1972 novel by Fletcher Knebel
- Dark Horse, a 2015 novel by Nilotpal Mrinal
- Dark Horse, a 1992 novel by Warren Murphy and Richard Sapir; the eighty-ninth installment in The Destroyer novel series
- Dark Horse (Reed novel), a 2008 novel by Ralph Reed
- Dark Horse, a 1997 novel by Doug Richardson
- The Dark Horse, a 2002 children's novel by Marcus Sedgwick
- Dark Horse, a 1996 novel by Bill Shoemaker

=== Other ===
- Dark Horse, a 2018 non-fiction psychology/self-help book by Todd Rose and Ogi Ogas
- The Dark Horse (magazine), a magazine published in Scotland
- Dark Horse Comics, a comic book publisher
- Dark Horse Records: The Story of George Harrison's Post-Beatles Record Label, a biography of George Harrison's Dark Horse Records

== Film and television ==
=== Films ===
- The Dark Horse (1932 film), an American comedy film
- The Dark Horse (1946 film), an American film directed by Will Jason
- Dark Horse (1992 film), an American film directed by David Hemmings
- Dark Horse (2005 film), a Danish-Icelandic film directed by Dagur Kári
- Dark Horse (2011 film), an American film directed by Todd Solondz
- The Dark Horse (2014 film), a New Zealand film directed by James Napier Robertson
- Dark Horse: The Incredible True Story of Dream Alliance, a 2015 documentary about the racehorse
- Dark Horse (2026 film), an upcoming American biographic drama film

=== Television ===
- "The Dark Horse" (Tanner '88), a 1988 episode
- "A Dark Horse", a 2023 episode of The Power of Parker

=== Companies ===
- Dark Horse Entertainment, the film and television production arm of Dark Horse Comics (see above)
- Dark Horse, an Australian film production company owned by filmmaker Catriona McKenzie

== Music ==
- Dark Horse Records, a record label owned by George Harrison

=== Albums ===
- Dark Horse (George Harrison album), 1974
- Darkhorse, by Crazy Town, 2002
- The Dark Horse (Achilles album) or the title song, 2005
- Dark Horse – A Live Collection, by Ryan Star, 2006
- Dark Horse (Nickelback album), 2008
- Dark Horse (Twista album) or the title song, 2014
- Dark Horse (Devin Dawson album) or the title song, 2018
- Dark Horse, by Caitlin & Will, unreleased

=== Songs ===
- "Dark Horse" (George Harrison song), 1974
- "Dark Horse" (Amanda Marshall song), 1997 song recorded by both Amanda Marshall and Mila Mason
- "Dark Horse", by Converge from Axe to Fall, 2009
- "Dark Horses", by Switchfoot from Vice Verses, 2011
- "Dark Horse", by the Ghost Inside from Get What You Give, 2012
- "Dark Horse" (Katy Perry song), 2013
- "The Dark Horse", by Scale the Summit from The Migration, 2013

=== Concert tours ===
- Alternative name for George Harrison and Ravi Shankar's 1974 North American tour
- Dark Horse Tour, 2008–2010 world tour by Nickelback

== Other uses ==
- Operation Darkhorse offensive against the Bangsamoro Islamic Freedom Fighters (BIFF)
- Darkhorse Theater Nashville, Tennessee
- Darkhorse (band)
- Dark Horse (astronomy), a large dark nebula
- Dark Horse Brewery, a brewpub in Marshall, Michigan, U.S.
- 3rd Battalion, 5th Marines, nicknamed "Dark Horse", an infantry battalion in the U.S. Marine Corps
- Dark Horse, a hybrid 3D computer proposed by Los Alamos National Laboratory prior to the IBM Roadrunner
- DarkHorse Podcast, a podcast presented by Bret Weinstein and Heather Heying
- Darkhorse, an uncrewed hypersonic aircraft being developed by the American startup Hermeus
- Dark Horse, a model of Ford Mustang (seventh generation)

== See also ==
- Dark Horses (disambiguation)
