= Roxbury, Queens =

Community in Queens, New York

Coordinates: 40°34′1″N 73°53′24″W

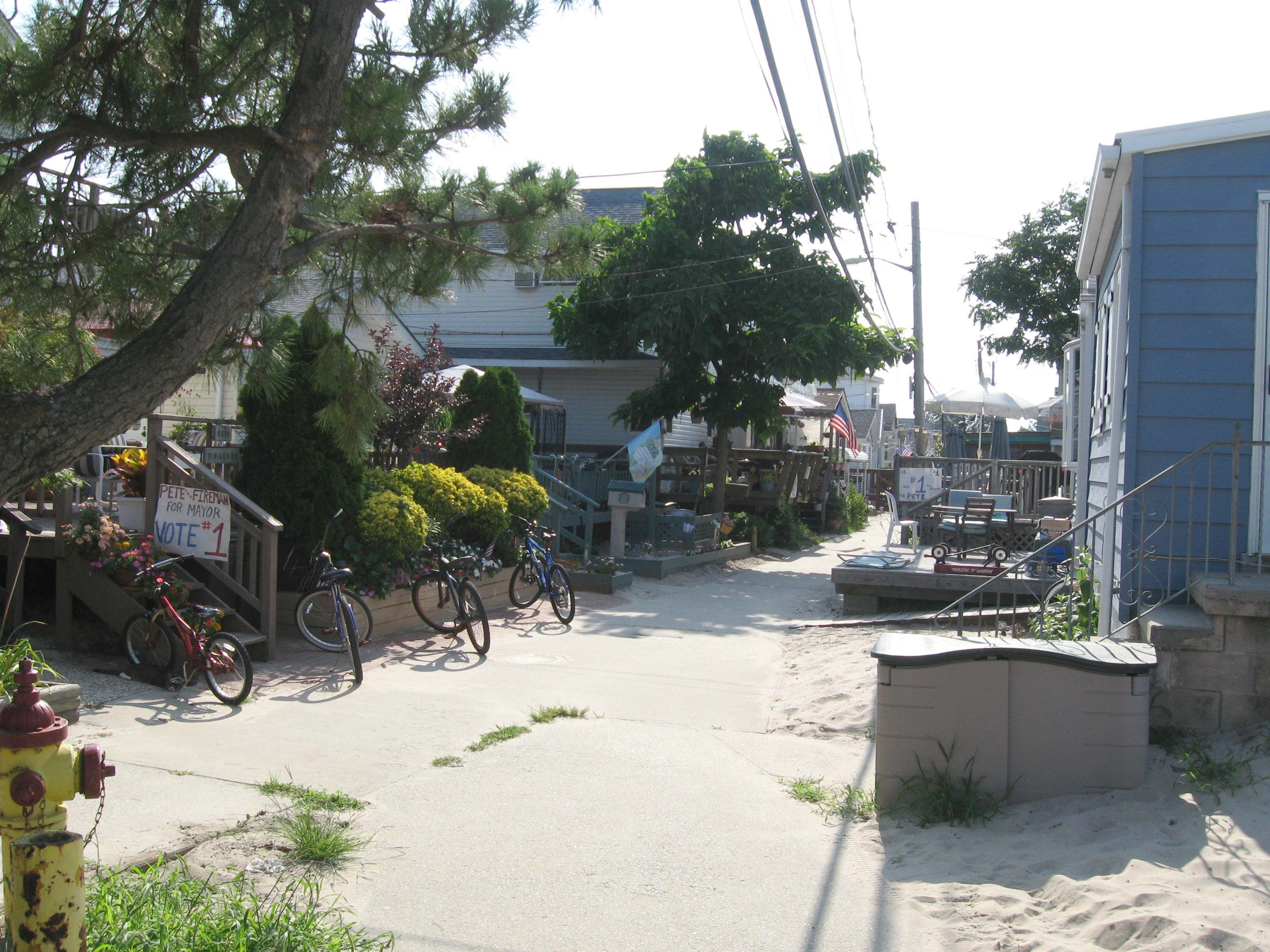
Most streets are not paved

Location in New York City

Roxbury is a community on the Rockaway Peninsula in the New York City borough of Queens originally settled by Irish immigrants in the early 20th century. The neighborhood is just west of the Marine Parkway–Gil Hodges Memorial Bridge and adjoins Fort Tilden. It is an inholding within the borders of the Breezy Point Unit of Gateway National Recreation Area, of the National Park System. The area was severely affected by Hurricane Sandy in 2012.

Roxbury is part of the Breezy Point Cooperative, a private property owning corporation of residents. Of the roughly 2,000 homes in the cooperative, Roxbury makes up around 400 of them. Specific parking stickers are required to park in the community.

Roxbury, like other parts of the Rockaway Peninsula, has a significantly larger proportion of residents with Irish-American heritage.
