= Barren Island, Brooklyn =

Former island in Brooklyn, New York

Barren Island
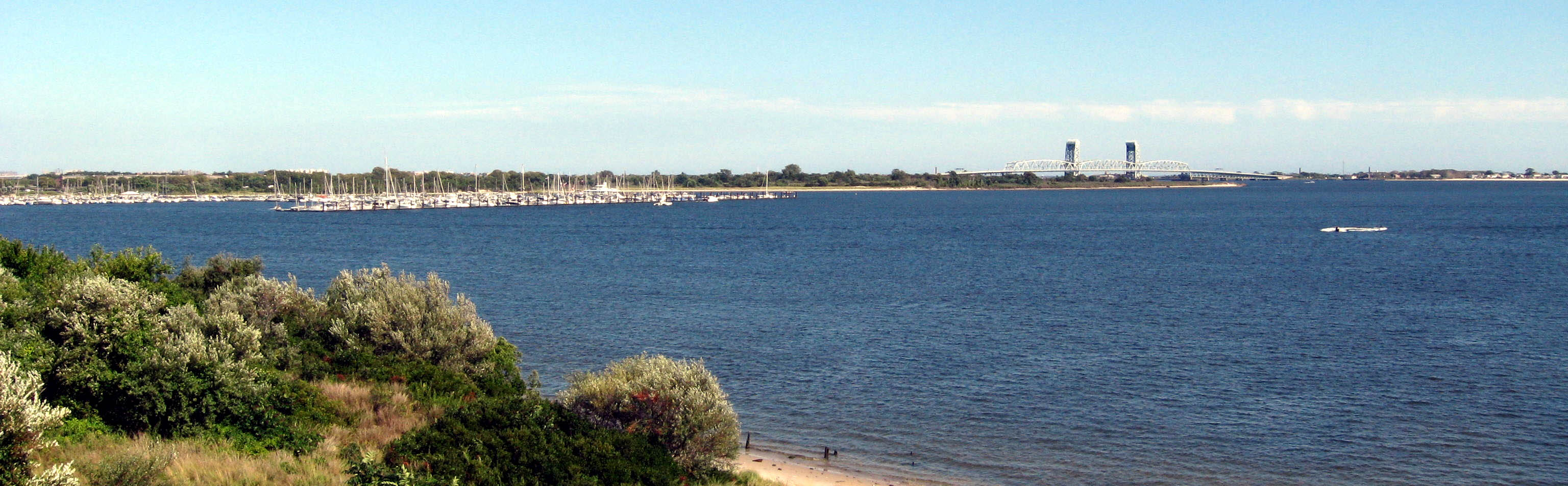
- View of Barren Island from Dead Horse Bay
- Interactive map of Barren Island
- Etymology: Dutch for "Bears' Island"

Geography
- Location: Jamaica Bay
- Coordinates: 40°35′34″N 73°53′35″W
- Archipelago: Outer Barrier

Administration
- United States
- State: New York
- City: New York City
- Borough: Brooklyn

Demographics
- Population: 1,500 (1930s)

Additional information
- Time zone: Eastern (UTC– 05:00)
  - Summer (DST): EDT (UTC– 04:00)

Barren Island is a peninsula and former island on the southeast shore of Brooklyn in New York City. Located on Jamaica Bay, it was geographically part of the Outer Barrier island group on the South Shore of Long Island. The island was occupied by the Lenape Native Americans prior to the arrival of Dutch settlers in the 17th century. Its name is a corruption of Beeren Eylandt, the Dutch-language term for "Bears' Island".

Barren Island remained sparsely inhabited before the 19th century, mainly because of its relative isolation from the rest of the city. Starting in the 1850s, the island was developed as an industrial complex with fish rendering plants and other industries, and also as an ethnically diverse community of up to 1,500 residents. Between the mid-19th century and 1934, the island housed industrial plants that processed the carcasses of the city's dead horses, converting them into a variety of industrial products. This activity led to the still-extant waterbody on the island's western shore becoming nicknamed "Dead Horse Bay". A garbage incinerator, which became the subject of numerous complaints because of its odor, operated on the island from the 1890s to 1921.

The Barren Island community became known as South Flatlands during its final years. By the 1920s, most of the industrial activity had tapered off, and landfill was used to unite the island with the rest of Brooklyn. While most residents were evicted in the late 1920s for the construction of Floyd Bennett Field, some were permitted to stay until 1942, when the airfield was expanded as a wartime base of the United States Navy. No trace remains of the former island's industrial use. Since 1972, Floyd Bennett Field has been part of the Gateway National Recreation Area, managed by the National Park Service.

== Geography and ecology ==
Barren Island was originally part of an estuary at the mouth of Jamaica Bay and acted as a barrier island for the larger Long Island, located to Barren Island's north. The bay, in turn, was created during the end of the Wisconsin glaciation. The edge of the glacier had been in the middle of Long Island, creating a series of hills across the island. The water from the melting glacier ran downhill toward a low-lying delta that adjoined the Atlantic Ocean, which later became Jamaica Bay. A body of water called Rockaway Inlet, located south of the island, connected the bay with the ocean. By the late 17th century, Barren Island had 70 acres (28 hectares) of salt meadows and 30 acres (12 ha) of uplands, as well as cedar forests. Salt, reed grasses, and hay served as food for early settlers' livestock.

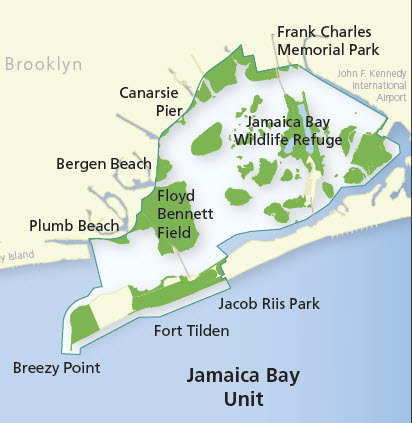
Map of the Gateway National Recreation Area's Jamaica Bay unit; Barren Island was located near where Floyd Bennett Field is now

Barren Island's geography was significantly altered by shifting tides and storms in the 19th century. Originally, it was part of the Outer Barrier, a series of barrier islands on Long Island's southern shore. Barren Island, the Rockaways, Pelican Beach, and Plumb Beach were separate barrier islands protecting Jamaica Bay. In an 1818 survey of Long Island, Barren Island was described as having dunes and scattered trees. By 1839, Barren Island, Plumb Beach, and Pelican Beach were a single island, separated from Coney Island to the west by Plumb Beach Inlet. By the end of the century, Gerritsen Inlet had formed, separating Barren Island from Plumb and Pelican Beaches.

The neighboring island of Rockaway Beach also had a large impact on Barren Island's geography. Originally, Rockaway was located to Barren's east, and the two islands' southern tips were aligned. From the mid-19th century, Rockaway Beach was extended more than one mile (1.6 km) to the southwest after several jetties were built to protect manmade developments there. This caused changes to Barren Island's ecology, because during the early 20th century, it had contained sand dunes on the coasts and salt marshes inland. As a result of the extension of Rockaway Beach, Barren Island was no longer a barrier island and its beach was washed away.

By the late 1920s, industrial development on Barren Island's eastern side had transformed that area, with a small patch of dunes remaining. The western side of the island, containing dunes, woods, and wetlands, was largely untouched. The southern coast contained a tidal creek stretching into the center of the island, where the tidal wetlands remained mostly intact. The wetlands were abutted by the human-made Mill Basin to the north. Tidal creeks also stretched across the island's marshes, although one of these creeks was bisected by the construction of Flatbush Avenue in 1925. In addition, the water adjoining the northern and western coasts had become heavily polluted. The entirety of the former island, covering 1,300 acres (530 hectares), was converted to a peninsula during the 1920s. It is occupied by Floyd Bennett Field, which in turn is part of the Gateway National Recreation Area.

== Name ==
The Barren Island area was originally the homeland of the Canarsee, a group of Lenape Native Americans, who referred to the archipelago of islands near it by a name alternatively transcribed as "Equandito", "Equendito", or "Equindito", which means "Broken Lands". This name also applied to several smaller islands in the area, such as Mill Island. Throughout its existence, Barren Island has also been referred to as "Broken Lands" in English, as well as "Bearn Island", "Barn Island", and "Bear's Island". The name "Barren Island" is a corruption of the Dutch Beeren Eylandt; it does not relate to the English word describing the geography of the island.

== Settlement ==
A State University of New York study stated that the indigenous Canarsee likely used Barren Island to fish. In 1636, as New Netherland was expanding outward from present-day Manhattan, Dutch settlers founded the town of Achtervelt (later Amersfoort) and purchased 15,000 acres (6,100 ha) around Jamaica Bay north of Barren Island. Amersfoort was centered around the present-day intersection of Flatbush Avenue and Flatlands Avenue, approximately 2 miles (3.2 km) northwest of Barren Island. In 1664, New Netherland became the English Province of New York, and Amersfoort was renamed Flatlands. The island, as well as nearby Mill Basin, was sold to John Tilton Jr. and Samuel Spicer that year.

Canarsee leaders had signed 22 land agreements with Dutch settlers by 1684, which handed ownership of much of their historic land, including Barren Island, to the Dutch. Barren Island was one of the first barrier islands to be settled because it was easily accessible. At low tide, people on mainland Brooklyn could walk across a shallow stream, while at high tide, small craft could access the northern coast and larger craft could dock on the southern coast.

Barren Island, as well as nearby Mill Island and Bergen Island, were part of the Town of Flatlands. By the 1670s, all three islands were leased by a settler named Elbert Elbertse. Records from 1679 indicate that Elbertse had complained that other settlers were going to Barren Island to let their horses graze on his land. The settler William Moore started digging sand from the island in the 1740s. Moore characterized the island as "vacant and unoccupied" in 1762, and it remained as such until the end of that century, being used mainly as a grazing field. Even during the first half of the 19th century, the island had few residents. Circa 1800, a man named Nicholas Dooley established an inn and entertainment venue for fishermen and hunters on the east side of Barren Island; the house's ownership later passed to the Johnson family. Two more residences were built on the island before 1860, for the Skidmore and Cherry families. Maps from that time do not show any other human-made structures on Barren Island.

The National Park Service states that the pirate Charles Gibbs buried Mexican silver on the island c. 1830. According to an 1839 account, some of the treasure was later recovered. A handbook from the Brooklyn Daily Eagle states that a portion of the treasure was retrieved in 1842, while the remainder was never found.

== Fish-oil and fertilizer plants ==
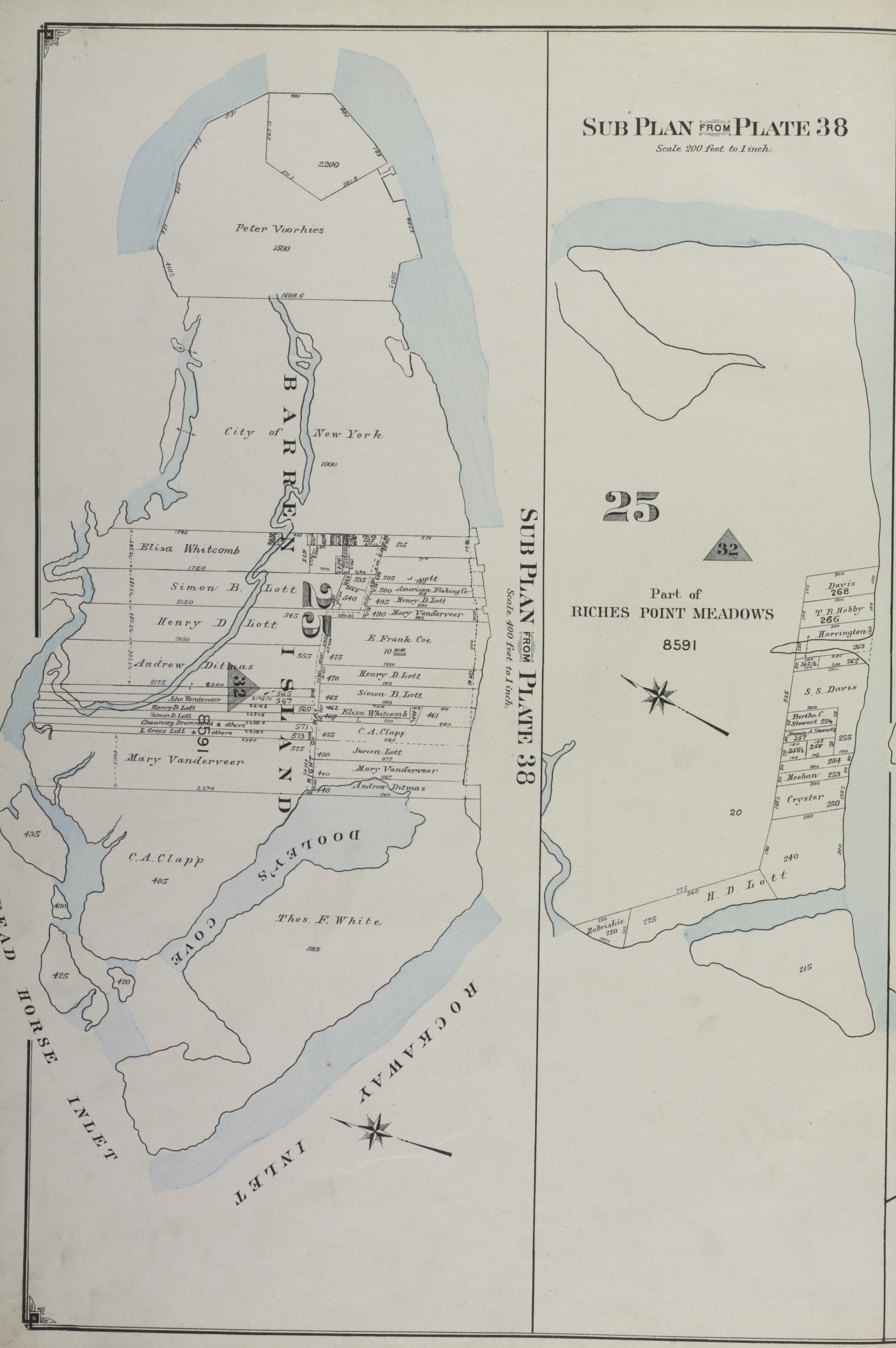
A 1916 diagram of Barren Island, showing the inlets on the island prior to the 1920s filling operations

The naturally deep Rockaway Inlet, combined with the remoteness of Barren Island from the rest of the developed city, made the island suitable for industrial uses. An isolated settlement on the island was developed in the late 19th century. From 1859 to 1934, approximately 26 industries had opened facilities on Barren Island, mostly on the eastern and southern coasts. Few industrial sectors were enticed to move to Barren Island, precisely because of its isolation: there were no direct land routes to the rest of the city. Waste management was the sole industry for which Barren Island was an ideal location, and became its main industry.

The island's first main industrial use was for fish rendering plants, as well as for fertilizer plants that processed offal products. The fish rendering plants processed schools of menhaden, a type of fish that was caught off the coast of Long Island, and turned them into fish oil or scraps. Meanwhile, the fertilizer plants turned horse bones into glue, as well as fertilizer, buttons, and materials for refining gold and sugar. The plants processed almost 20,000 horse corpses annually at their peak, leading to the nickname "Dead Horse Bay" for the still-extant water body on the island's western shore, since the waste processors on the island would simply dump the processed waste into that bay. By the late 1850s, two plants had been built on the island. The plant on the eastern shore was operated by Lefferts R. Cornell and processed animal carcases; after the facility was destroyed by fire in 1859, Cornell moved his factory to Flatbush. The other corpse-processing plant, on the western shore, was operated by William B. Reynolds and ceased operations during the 1860s. These fertilizer factories were the first buildings on Barren Island for which the town of Flatlands imposed property taxes.

Ownership of part of the island passed in 1861 to Francis Swift. No new factories were developed until at least 1868, when Smith & Co. opened a 45-acre (18 ha) fish-processing factory. Steinfield and Company operated a factory from 1869 to 1873, but its purpose is unknown. A person named Simpson opened a factory on Barren Island in 1870, which closed two years later. Swift and E. P. White also created their own fertilizer factory in 1872, which operated until the 1930s. A factory belonging to the Products Manufacturing Company, located where Flatbush Avenue is now, was reportedly the world's largest carcass-processing plant. Through the 1870s, eight more factories opened on the island, of which two operated only briefly. Barren Island's factories, which were vulnerable to landslides, fires, or waves from high-tide, typically lasted for fleeting periods of time. White's factory burned down in 1878 and was soon rebuilt. By 1883, the island's oil factories hired a combined 350 men and collectively used 10 steamships.

The waste-processing factories on Barren Island supported a small but thriving community, which was clustered on the island's southeastern coast. In a census conducted by the town of Flatlands in 1870, it was noted than 24 people, all single men who had immigrated from Europe, lived in a single residence and likely worked at an oil factory on Barren Island. A subsequent census in 1880 counted six households that were entirely composed of single men, as well as 17 families, and found that 309 people resided on the island. That same year, it was recorded that the island had three fish oil factories and four fertilizer plants. The development of Barren Island continued in tandem with the population growth: in 1878, there were six large structures on the island's southern and eastern coasts, in contrast to the single hotel that had been reported in the 1852 map. By 1884, five hundred people worked on the island. The 1892 New York state census recorded four large "clusters" of laborers, from the same countries as the 1880 census, who resided in the same households on Barren Island.

The Rockaway Park Improvement Company complained in 1891 that the "offensive" smells from Barren Island were ruining the quality of life for vacationers in the Rockaways, located across the Rockaway Inlet from Barren Island. The New York State Health Board composed a report about the status of the industries on Barren Island. Subsequently, New York Governor David B. Hill declared four companies to be "public nuisances", ordering twice-weekly inspections of their factories to ensure that the companies complied with health regulations.

== Garbage processing ==
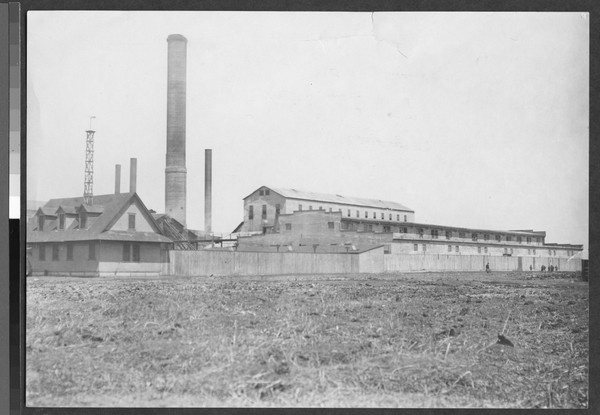
A factory on Barren Island, pictured c. 1911–1916

There had been a steep decline in the number of menhaden off Long Island by the late 1890s, which, combined with the Panic of 1893, resulted in the closure of the fish-oil plants. The carcass-dumping continued: in one five-day span in August 1896, records show that 1,256 horse carcasses had been processed. That year, the city government awarded the New York Sanitary Utilization Company a US$1 million contract to operate on Barren Island, having unsuccessfully attempted to bury waste in Rikers Island. The company, which collected garbage from hotels around the city, operated a garbage incinerator that turned New York City's waste into fertilizer, grease, and soap. Residents of nearby Brooklyn communities opposed the construction of the incinerator, without success. By 1897, the island was home to two garbage plants and four animal-processing plants. The same year, the town of Flatlands was subsumed into the City of Greater New York, becoming part of the city's 32nd Ward.

Barren Island soon became known for its use as a garbage dump, receiving waste and animal carcasses from Brooklyn, Manhattan, and the Bronx. New York City's other two boroughs, Queens and Staten Island, had their own garbage disposal sites. The Sanitary Utilization Company disposed of glass bottles and other non-processable items on the northern coast of Barren Island. Some valuable trash, such as jewelry, ended up on Barren Island. The island's residents did not mind the smell of the processed garbage, but the incinerator's scents were so noxious that residents of the rest of Brooklyn, four miles (6 km) away, could not stand the odors. In 1899, state and city lawmakers passed bills to reduce the stench, but these bills did not progress because the governor and mayor opposed these actions. The incinerator was damaged by fire in 1904, and two years later, another major fire caused US$1.5 million in damage and burned down 16 buildings. The unstable land along the coast caused numerous landslides from 1890 to 1907, which damaged factories on the island.

By the 1900s, the island was receiving seven or eight garbage scows per day, which collectively delivered 50 to 100 short tons (45 to 89 long tons; 45 to 91 metric tons) of trash. A boat of dead horses, cats, cows, and other animals arrived daily at the island. Workers at the horse processing factories were paid more than those at the garbage incinerator. As of the 1900 census, there were 520 Barren Island residents in 103 households, and all of the large "households" of male laborers had been dispersed. Around this time, there were four main landowners: the Sanitary Utilization Company, the Roman Catholic Diocese of Brooklyn, the government of Brooklyn, and the Products Manufacturing Company.

Barren Island served as a residential community for the families of laborers who worked there, and at its peak in the 1910s, it was home to an estimated 1,500 people. Most of these residents were either African-American laborers or immigrants from Italy, Ireland, or Poland, since few Americans were willing to work with the garbage-related industries; however, some farmers also resided on Barren Island. Despite the racial differences, the island's residents coexisted relatively peacefully, as opposed to the high racial strife present elsewhere in the United States. The island had a public school, a church, a post office, a New York City Police Department precinct, hotels and inns, various stores and saloons, and three ferry routes to other Brooklyn neighborhoods. A "Main Street" stretched east–west across Barren Island, lined with buildings that faced south toward Rockaway Inlet. The street grid in the island's central section was built haphazardly, based possibly on sand dune patterns. A caste system divided the different types of workers on the island: "rag pickers" were at the bottom of the hierarchy, followed by metal-and-paper scavengers, then bone sorters. The island's African-American residents were considered to be part of the lowest caste. Students who lived on Barren Island were dismissed from school early so that they could help their parents scavenge. The island had no running water, sewage treatment, or New York City Fire Department stations. An 1897 article in the Brooklyn Daily Eagle described pools of sewage around the school buildings and on the island's main street, as well as accumulations of trash scattered haphazardly across the island, and noted that "how any person manages to work on the island is a mystery".

Through the 1910s, as the odors became worse, more complaints were filed with the city government, and real estate developers in adjacent communities such as the Rockaways and Flatlands cajoled the city government to take action. Residents in nearby neighborhoods blamed their illnesses on the smells, and one group from Neponsit, Queens—located in the Rockaways—claimed that 750,000 residents in an eight-mile (13 km) radius were subject to the odors emanating from Barren Island. In 1916, New York City Mayor John Purroy Mitchel announced that a new garbage landfill would be built on Staten Island to replace the Barren Island landfill. Because of complaints from Staten Islanders, the location of the landfill was changed several times. The city government eventually decided to build the landfill in Fresh Kills, an isolated plain on Staten Island that was far away from the vast majority of Barren Island's residents. It had overruled several injunctions and formal complaints from Staten Island residents who did not want a landfill anywhere in the borough. Politicians from the Democratic Party accused Mitchel, a member of the rival Republican Party, of corruption. Mayoral candidate John Hylan said that if he were elected in the upcoming year's mayoral election, he would relocate the landfill off Staten Island. Hylan ultimately won the election against Mitchel, and he threatened to revoke the Fresh Kills landfill operator's license. Hylan ultimately restored dumping operations at Barren Island, despite having denied rumors about the resumption of such operations. After political backlash, the city government started paying US$1,000 per day to the Sanitary Utilization Company to dispose of the city's trash.

The city government started dumping its trash into the ocean in 1919, and the Sanitary Utilization Company closed its facility two years later. Additionally, the advent of automobile travel reduced horse-drawn travel in New York City, and resulted in fewer horse cadavers being processed on Barren Island. By 1918, the island processed 600 horse carcasses per year; it had once processed the same number of corpses in 12 days. The Thomas F. White Company closed the E. P. White fertilizer factory by around 1921 and started demolishing the Sanitary Utilization Company facility around the same time. The final horse processing plant closed in 1921. The last garbage processing plant on Barren Island, the Products Manufacturing Company, was transferred to city ownership in 1933, and operations ceased two years later.

== Seaport plans and decline of community ==
Map of Wards 31 and 32 in 1920, showing Barren Island under "Sections 38 and 39"

In 1910, developers began dredging ports within Jamaica Bay in an effort to develop a seaport district. Although the city approved the construction of several piers in 1918, only one was built. That pier, which was built to receive landfill for the other proposed piers, stretched one mile (1.6 km) northeast and was 700 feet (210 m) wide.

By the 1920s, two factories and several residents remained on the island. A municipal ferry service to the Rockaway Peninsula and an extension of Flatbush Avenue were both opened in 1925. The new modes of transportation were part of a proposal to develop Barren Island as a seaport. The creeks along Barren Island's coast were to be turned into canals, and the city had bought the western part of the island for use as parkland. The new transport options provided some short-term benefits for the remaining residents, who could go to "mainland" Brooklyn to work and shop. Residents of "mainland" Brooklyn could go to the Rockaway beaches by driving to the end of Barren Island and taking the ferry. Many of the buildings had been abandoned by 1928, though the public school and church remained. Three years later, the city took possession of 58 acres (23 ha) on the western side of the island, which comprised much of Main Street and the structures on the island's southwestern side. That plot was combined with a 110-acre (45 ha) tract owned by Kings County to create a public space called Marine Park.

During the island community's final years, a teacher named Jane F. Shaw (whom the press nicknamed the "Angel of Barren Island" and "Lady Jane") was hired at the island's public school. Shaw later became the principal and lobbied on behalf of the island, persuading Senator Robert F. Wagner to rename the island "South Flatlands" in order to integrate it with the city. After a census in 1930 neglected to count Barren Island, Shaw cajoled the United States Census Bureau into counting the island's remaining 416 residents. When New York City parks commissioner Robert Moses ordered the eviction of all residents in early 1936, Shaw persuaded him to move the eviction date to the end of June, so her students could complete their school year.

== Airport and park use ==
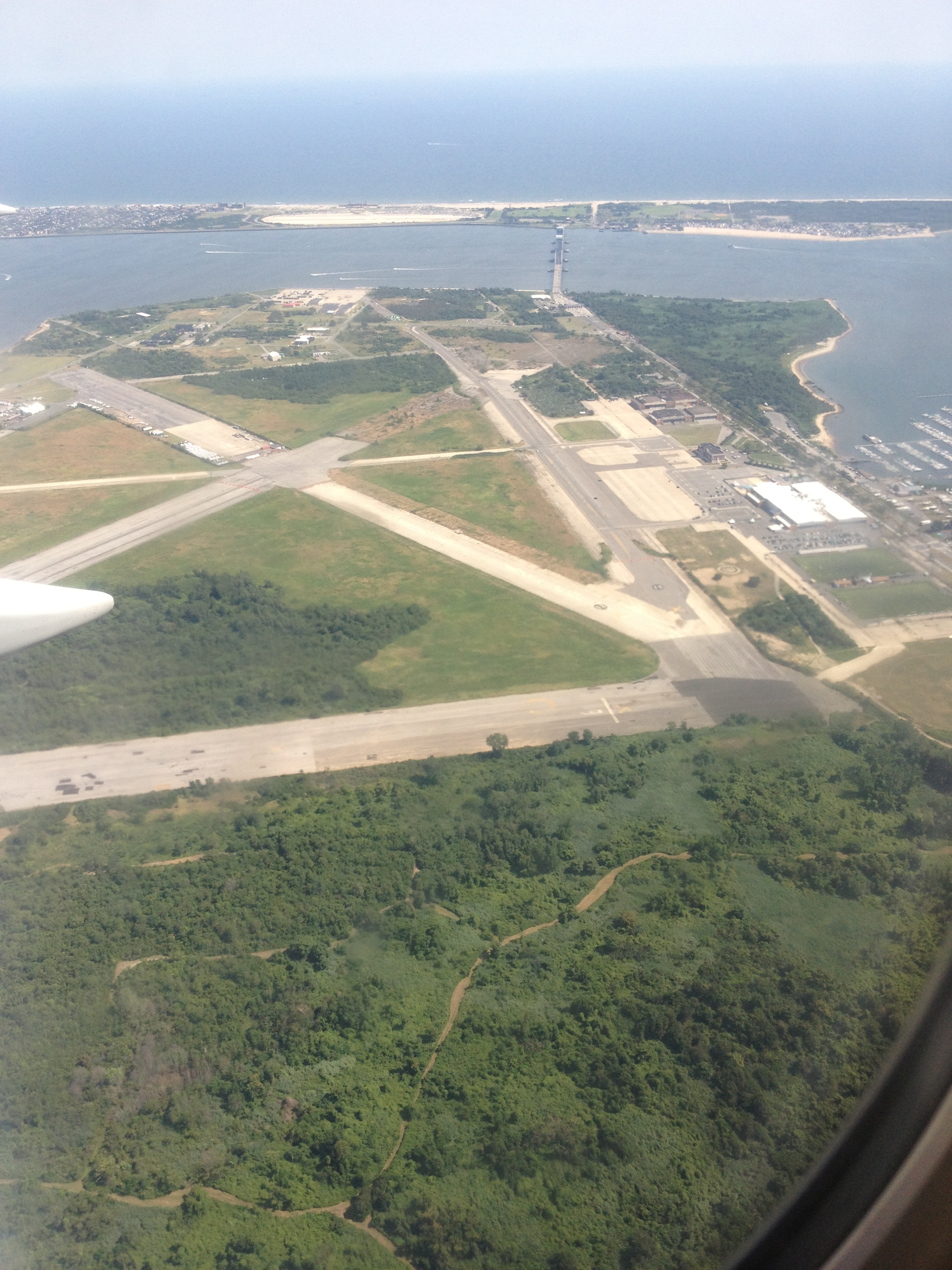
The decommissioned Floyd Bennett Field, located on the former Barren Island site

The pilot Paul Rizzo opened the privately operated Barren Island Airport in 1927. The next year, the city's aeronautic engineer Clarence Chamberlin chose Barren Island as the site for the city's new municipal airport, which would become Floyd Bennett Field. The New York City Department of Docks was in charge of constructing the Barren Island Airport. A contract for the airport's construction, awarded in May 1928, entailed filling in or leveling 4,450,000 cubic yards (3,400,000 m^{3}) of soil across a 350-acre (140 ha) parcel. Sand from Jamaica Bay was used to connect Barren Island and adjacent islands, as well as raise the site to 16 feet (4.9 m) above the high-tide mark. A subsequent contract involved filling in an extra 833,000 cubic yards (637,000 m^{3}) of land. Floyd Bennett Field was formally completed in 1931, at which time about 400 people still lived on the island.

In 1935, the city acquired 1,822 acres (737 ha), including the entire island west of Flatbush Avenue, for Robert Moses's expansion of Marine Park. Early the following year, Moses attempted to evict the remaining Barren Island residents, but they simply moved to a still-occupied portion of the island. At the time, twenty-five people lived on a 90-acre (36 ha) spit at the southern end of the island. When the Marine Parkway Bridge to the Rockaways and Jacob Riis Park was completed in 1937, Flatbush Avenue was extended across Barren Island to connect with the bridge, and Barren Island was no longer isolated from the rest of the city.

Bennett Field was taken over by the United States Navy in 1941 and converted to Naval Air Station New York. The next year, the Navy expanded the airport's facilities to the southern tip of Barren Island, forcing the former island's last residents to move out. During its wartime upgrade of Bennett Field, the Navy burned and cleared all remaining structures on Barren Island, and eliminated its original landscape. No trace of the community remains, as Barren Island had been totally subsumed by Bennett Field. In 1972, Bennett Field was turned over to the National Park Service as part of the Gateway National Recreation Area's Jamaica Bay Unit.

In the 1950s, Moses expanded the former island, by then a peninsula, to the west using garbage covered by topsoil. The layer of soil later eroded, and by the 2010s, garbage could be seen on the coast during low tide. The coast contains many exposed broken glass bottles and other non-biodegradable material, and as such, the site has been used for beachcombing. In August 2020, the National Park Service announced that Dead Horse Bay would be closed indefinitely because of the presence of radiological contamination. The contamination was identified as having come from two deck markers, though the risk of radiological exposure was considered low.

== Media ==
Carol Zoref's novel Barren Island, about an Eastern European immigrant family's experiences on the island, was placed on the 2017 National Book Award for Fiction's "longlist" and won the Association of Writers & Writing Programs' 2015 Award Series as well as a National Jewish Book Award. In addition, in 2019, Miriam Sicherman published Brooklyn's Barren Island: A Forgotten History, which described Barren Island's history.

== See also ==
- List of smaller islands in New York City

== Sources ==
- Black, Frederick R. (1981). "Jamaica Bay: a History" (PDF). United States Department of the Interior, National Park Service. Archived (PDF) from the original on February 5, 2017.
- Blakemore, Porter R.; Linck, Dana C. (May 1981). "Historic Structure Report: Floyd Bennett Field; Gateway National Recreation Area, New Jersey-New York" (PDF). United States Department of the Interior, National Park Service. Archived from the original (PDF) on September 11, 2014.
- Cody, Sarah K.; Auwaerter, John; Curry, George W. (2009). "Cultural Landscape Report for Floyd Bennett Field" (PDF). nps.gov. State University of New York, College of Environmental Science and Forestry. Archived (PDF) from the original on June 6, 2017.
- Dubois, Anson (1884). A History of the Town of Flatlands, Kings County, N.Y. Brooklyn, N.Y. [W.W. Munsell].
- Seitz, Sharon; Miller, Stuart (2011). The Other Islands of New York City: A History and Guide (Third ed.). Countryman Press. pp. 257–264. ISBN 978-1-58157-886-7. Archived from the original on February 7, 2018.
- Sicherman, Miriam (2019). Brooklyn's Barren Island A Forgotten History. Chicago: Arcadia Publishing. ISBN 978-1-4396-6856-6. OCLC 1125108159. Archived from the original on June 14, 2021.
- Wrenn, Tony P. (October 31, 1975). "General History of the Jamaica Bay, Breezy Point, and Staten Island Units, Gateway National Recreation Area, New York NY" (PDF). Archived (PDF) from the original on April 14, 2016.
