= Dead Horse Bay =

Bay in Brooklyn, New York

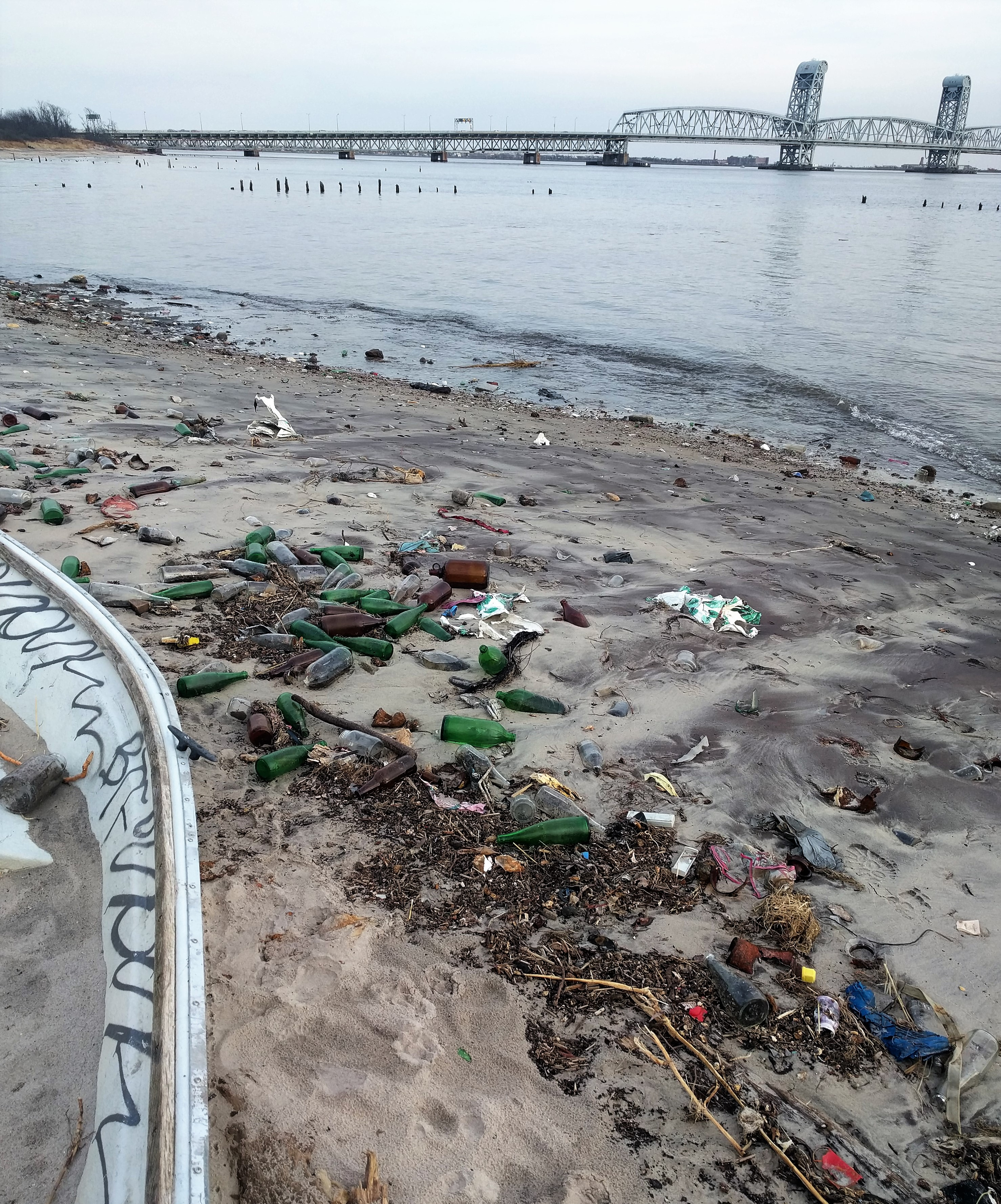
- Bottle Beach, the western shore of the bay

- Location within New York City Location within Long Island Location within New York
- Interactive map of Dead Horse Bay
- Location: Brooklyn, New York; Gateway National Recreation Area
- Coordinates: 40°34′56″N 73°53′55″W
- Type: Bay
- Part of: Jamaica Bay
- Primary inflows: Gerritsen Creek
- Primary outflows: Rockaway Inlet
- Basin countries: United States
- Managing agency: National Park Service
- Designation: Protected
- Built: ~1948
- Average depth: 10–20 feet (3.0–6.1 m)
- Residence time: Year round
- Frozen: December-February
- References: Depth

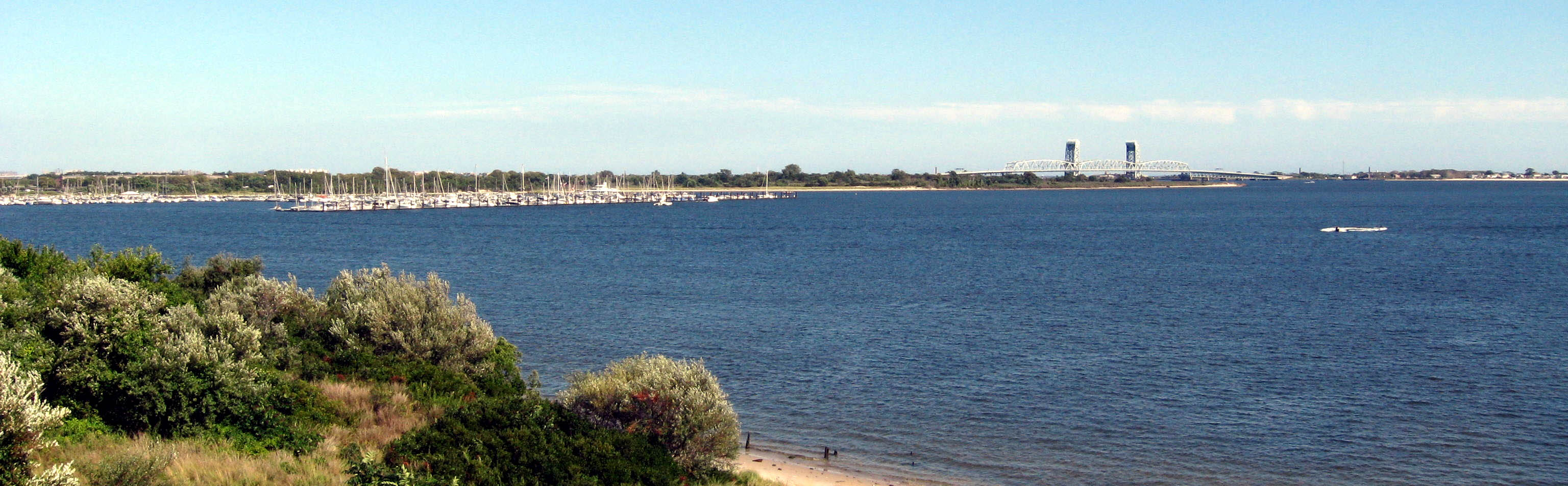
Gerritsen Inlet and marina on left; Dead Horse Bay center; Rockaway Inlet, Marine Parkway–Gil Hodges Memorial Bridge, and Rockaway, Queens on right

Dead Horse Bay is a small body of water off Barren Island, between the Gerritsen Inlet and Rockaway Inlet in the New York City borough of Brooklyn.

== History ==
Glass Bottle Beach, facing the Marine Parkway–Gil Hodges Memorial Bridge

From the nineteenth century to the twentieth century, the area has been used in a variety of ways, including manufacturing fertilizer from the remains of dead animals, producing fish oil from the menhaden caught in the bay, and more recently a landfill for the disposal of New York City’s garbage. Periodic clogging by carcasses from the adjacent glue factory with a 200 foot chimney gave the bay its name. A millstone used to grind horse bones can still be found along the Millstone trail.

In 1926, much of the salt marsh surrounding Dead Horse Bay and the rest of Barren Island were pumped with sand from Jamaica Bay. This raised the land to 16 feet above the high tide mark and connected the islands to each other, and the mainland of Brooklyn, in order to create Floyd Bennett Field as New York City's first municipal airport. The entire area, including the historic airfield, is now managed by the National Park Service as part of the Jamaica Bay Unit of the Gateway National Recreation Area.

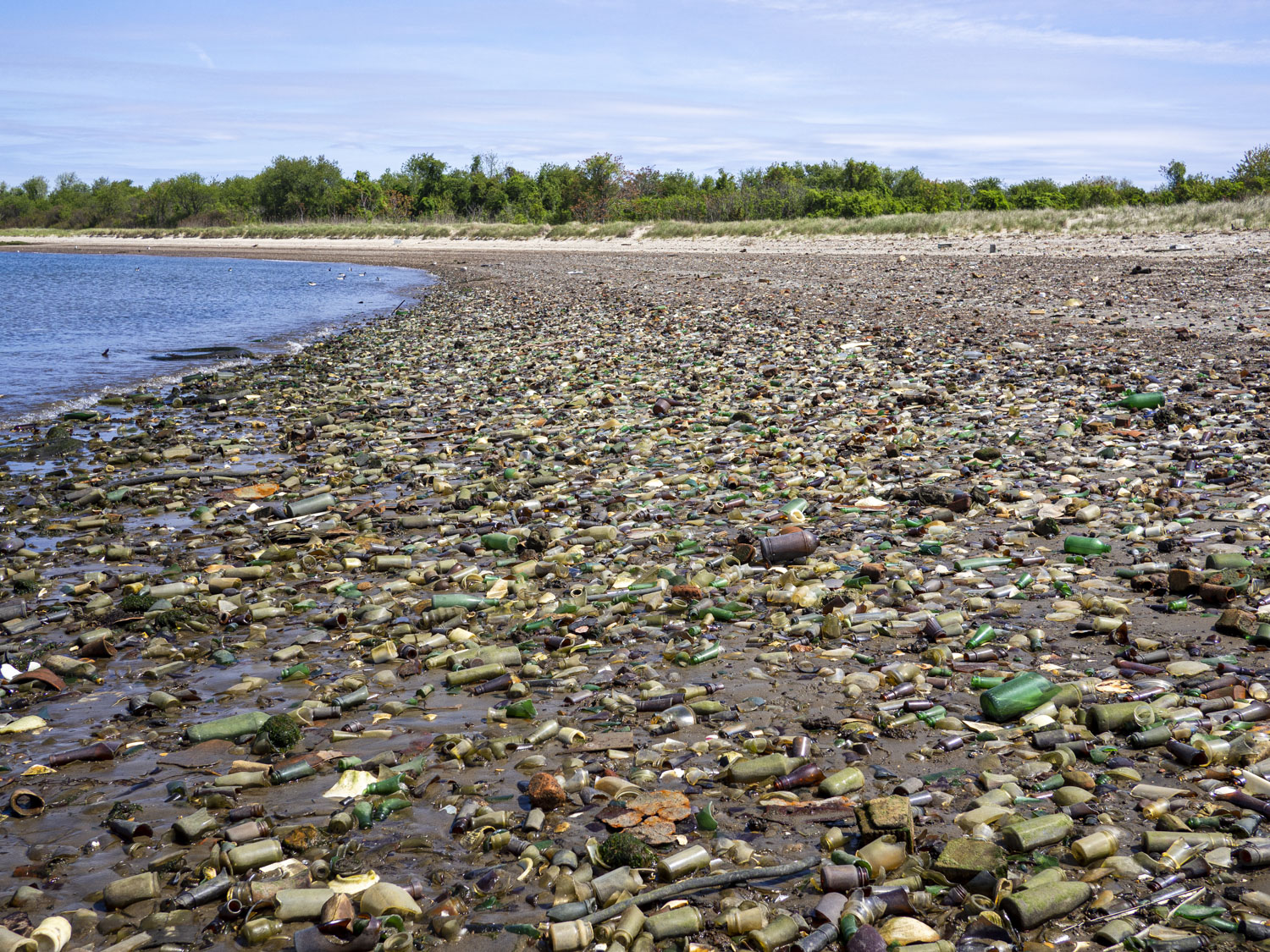
A view of Dead Horse Bay's Glass Bottle Beach from May 2020

In the 1950s, urban planner Robert Moses attempted to expand the now-peninsula to the west using garbage covered by topsoil, but the layer of soil eroded, and garbage can be seen on the coast during low tide. This coast contains many exposed broken glass bottles and other non-biodegradable material.

In August 2020, the National Park Service announced that Dead Horse Bay would be closed indefinitely because of the presence of radiological contamination. The NPS said at the time that the cleanup could last several years. The contamination was identified as having come from two deck markers, a type of Radium-226 or Strontium-90 based radioluminescent device used by the US military, though the risk of radiological exposure was considered low.

== Current use ==
School groups are taken to Dead Horse Bay on a regular basis to walk the Millstone trail, seine for a variety of fishes, and learn about the natural and cultural history of the area. Its shores are also a popular sport fishing spot, and home to a marina operating in Deep Creek as a National Park Service concession. Today one can find a large array of glass bottles and pieces of broken glass on the beach, along with old shoes and construction materials, many from the landfill which is now leaking. It is a popular place for artists and crafters to collect strange decorative materials.
