= Dark Horses =

Dark Horses may refer to:

== Music ==
- Dark Horses (band), a British rock band
- The Dark Horses, a band that plays with Tex Perkins
- Dark Horses (The Getaway Plan album) or the title song, 2015
- Dark Horses (Jon English album) or the title song, 1986
- Dark Horses (Tex Perkins album), 2000
- "Dark Horses" (song), by Switchfoot, 2011

== Other uses ==
- Dark Horses, a 1992 poetry collection by X. J. Kennedy

== See also ==
- Dark Horse (disambiguation)
