= Nilotpal Mrinal =

Indian author and activist (born 1984)

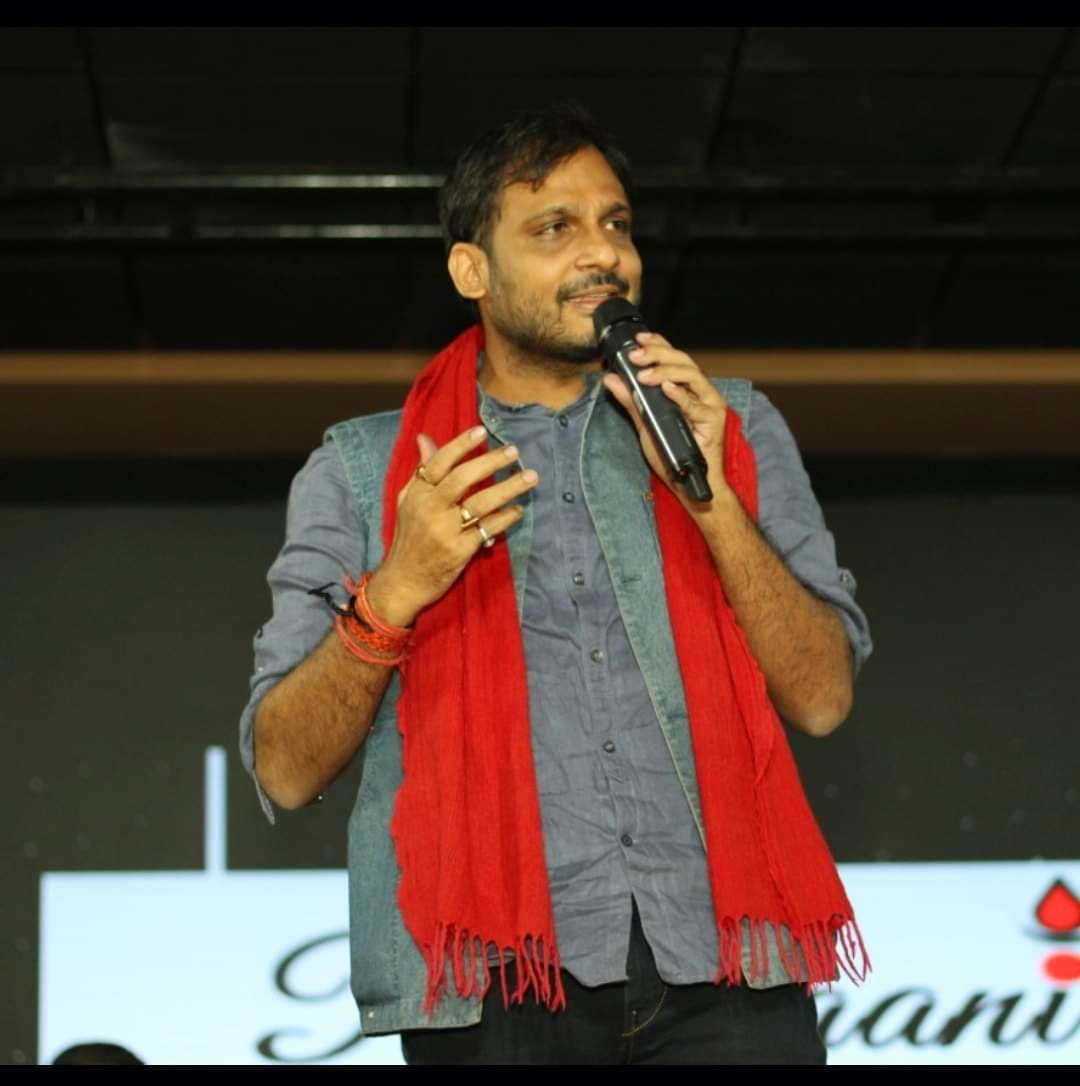
- Born: 25 December 1984 (age 41); Dumka, Jharkhand, India
- Occupations: Author; poet; activist
- Notable work: Dark Horse; Aughad; Yaar Jadugar; Vishwaguru
- Movement: CSAT Movement; Gamcha Movement
- Honours: Sahitya Akademi Yuva Puraskar (Hindi, 2016)

Nilotpal Mrinal (born 25 December 1984) is an Indian author, poet, socio-political activist and social media influencer. He is known for his books Dark Horse, Aughad and Yaar Jadugar. In 2016, he was awarded India's Sahitya Akademi Yuva Puraskar.

== Early life and education ==
Mrinal was born on 25 December 1984 in Dumka district, Jharkhand. He attended high school in Nonihat and graduated from St. Xavier's College, Ranchi in 2005. He moved to New Delhi in 2008, where he began preparing to enter civil service and had given the Civil Services Examination (CSE) several times.

== Career ==
Mrinal's first novel, Dark Horse, was published in 2015. Written in Hindi, it depicts the difficulties of leaving village life for that of the city, and is set against the backdrop of Mukherjee Nagar, Delhi. It received the Sahitya Academy Yuva Puraskar in 2016.

Four years later he released a second novel, Aughad. his third novel Yaar Jadugar published in 2021. After a long gap of four and a half years nilotpal published his fourth novel Vishwaguru in January 2026 and he recently announced his fifth novel 'Dulhin Savdhan' whose cover was unveiled by actor Pankaj Tripathi in a literary event.

He also writes poetry and folk songs, and has appeared as a motivational speaker for TED (conference) and Josh Talks.

== Notable works ==
=== Novels ===
- Dark Horse (2015)
- Aughad (2019)
- Yaar Jaadugar (2021)
- Vishwaguru (2026)
- Dulhin Savdhan (2026)

=== Audiobooks/series ===
- Jakhbaba (2019) for Storytel Originals
- Darling Democracy (2020) for Audible
- Railampel (2025) for Audible
- Astabal (2025) for Audible

=== Poetry and songs ===
- Duniya Esi Hua Karti Thi
- Chal Sadho Koi Desh
- Hum Bihar Hain
- Ab To Lagta Hai Desh Veerana
- Hum Hi To Kal Itihaas Likhenge
- Allahabad ke ladko
- O Maa Ye Duniya
- Jagat Mati Ka Dhela Re
- Ye Salli Dilli
- Hisab Karenge Booth Par

=== Bhojpuri poetry and songs ===
- Jata Mein Ganga
- Horilwa ke

=== Chhath songs ===
- Jagmag Kare i Sansar
- Sonchiraiya
- Chhath Maiya Hoiya Sahay
- Doobto Par Shish Navaiyeh
- Pahil Chhath
- Ghar Se Chhutal Chhath
