= Marine Parkway–Gil Hodges Memorial Bridge =

Bridge between Brooklyn and Queens, New York

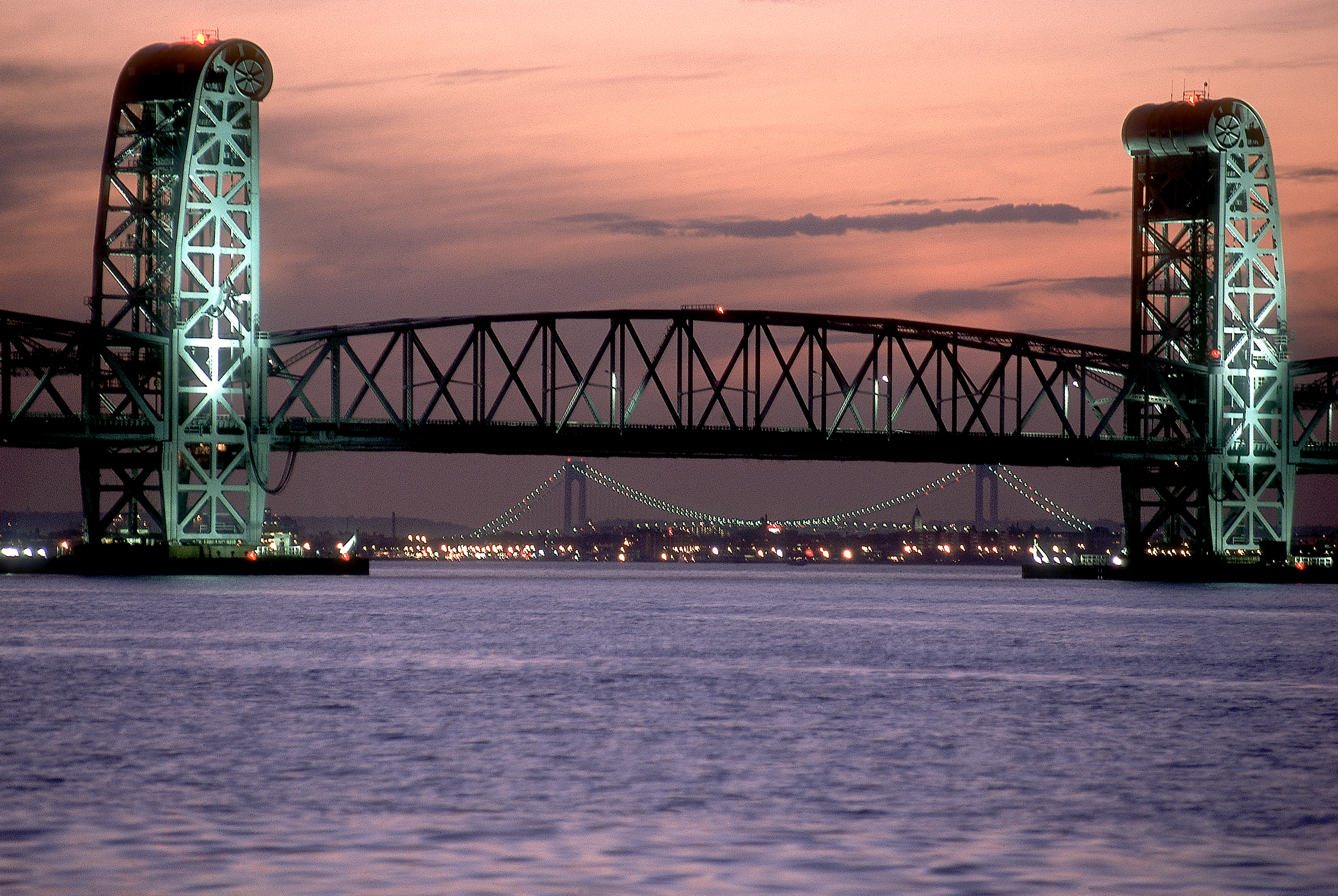
- The bridge, with the Verrazzano–Narrows Bridge visible in the background
- Coordinates: 40°34′24.4″N 73°53′5.8″W
- Carries: 4 lanes of Flatbush Avenue
- Crosses: Jamaica Bay
- Locale: Brooklyn and Queens, New York
- Maintained by: MTA Bridges and Tunnels

Characteristics
- Design: Vertical lift
- Total length: 4,022 feet (1,225.9 m)
- Longest span: 540 feet (164.6 m)
- Clearance above: 13 ft (4.0 m)
- Clearance below: 55 ft (17 m) at mean high water; 150 ft (46 m) in raised position

History
- Opened: July 3, 1937; 88 years ago

Statistics
- Daily traffic: 21,990 (2016)
- Toll: As of August 6, 2023, $5.60 (Tolls By Mail and non-New York E-ZPass); $2.60 (New York E-ZPass); $4.11 (Mid-Tier NYCSC E-Z Pass)

Location
- Interactive map of Marine Parkway–Gil Hodges Memorial Bridge

The Marine Parkway–Gil Hodges Memorial Bridge (originally and often referred to as the Marine Parkway Bridge) is a vertical-lift bridge in New York City, New York, that crosses Rockaway Inlet. The bridge, which opened on July 3, 1937, connects the Rockaway Peninsula in Queens, with Flatbush Avenue, in turn providing access to Floyd Bennett Field, Belt Parkway, and the Marine Park neighborhood in Brooklyn. The bridge is designated as New York State Route 901B, an unsigned reference route.

The center span is 540 feet (160 m) long and is normally 55 feet (17 m) above the water, although it can be raised to a height of 150 feet (46 m) above water level. With its distinctive twin towers (which house the vertical-lift machinery), the bridge has become an iconic landmark and symbol of the Rockaways.

The bridge is owned by the City of New York and operated by the MTA Bridges and Tunnels, an affiliate agency of the Metropolitan Transportation Authority. The operation of this bridge includes the maintenance of the Marine Parkway from the toll plaza to Jacob Riis Park. Though a city-owned and operated bridge, it connects Floyd Bennett Field and Jacob Riis Park, which are both part of the National Park System's Gateway National Recreation Area.

== History ==
=== Construction and opening ===
In February 1934, the New York State Assembly introduced a bill to build a $10 million bridge connecting Flatbush Avenue in Brooklyn to the Rockaway Peninsula in Queens. New York City Parks Commissioner Robert Moses wanted the bridge to connect Marine Park in Brooklyn and Jacob Riis Park in Queens, two of the parks that he was developing. The assembly authorized the creation of the Marine Parkway Authority, which was tasked with developing the bridge, in March. Moses was named as the only member of the authority. The next month, New York Governor Herbert H. Lehman approved the Assembly bill.

The Marine Parkway Bridge was to be constructed using Public Works Administration funds. The United States Department of War approved the Marine Parkway Authority's request to construct a bridge over Rockaway Inlet in December 1935, although some members of the War Department preferred a tunnel under the inlet so as to not impede marine traffic. In order to fund the bridge's construction the Marine Parkway Authority authorized the issuance of $6 million worth of bonds that would mature in 25 years. The bridge would also collect tolls from drivers to fund part of the rest of the costs. The Marine Parkway Bridge was developed in conjunction with other road infrastructure projects in New York City, such as the Triborough Bridge, Henry Hudson Parkway, Belt Parkway, and Grand Central Parkway. It would also be a part of a new greenbelt of parks that included Jacob Riis Park.

The bridge was to be built near Barren Island, an island on the Brooklyn side that housed 90 people from the former Barren Island community. In April 1936. The community was evicted so that the Marine Parkway Authority could place 2,000,000 cubic feet (57,000 m^{3}) of landfill to build a landing for the bridge, The Marine Parkway Authority opened a bidding competition for the construction of the Marine Parkway Bridge in June 1936. Eight bids had been submitted by the time the bidding process was completed in October 1936. The crossing's principal designer was David B. Steinman, with Richard S. M. Lee and Shortridge Hardesty as assistant designers, and Emil Praeger as Chief Engineer. The American Bridge Company ultimately ended up constructing the bridge since it had submitted the lowest bid, at just over $2.1 million.

The Marine Parkway Bridge was supposed to be completed in two years, but the construction process was accelerated because the city wanted the bridge to be completed in time to accommodate ferry traffic in summer 1937. By January 1937, there was significant progress on the Marine Parkway Bridge's construction, as the main span had been floated into place on January 13. The last section of the bridge was installed on May 26, 1937, and the toll bridge opened on July 3, 1937. A ceremonial opening had been scheduled for 10:30 AM that day, but the bridge was opened 15 minutes early in order to allow fire trucks to combat a five-alarm fire near the Rockaways' Playland amusement park in Rockaway Beach. At the time, the 540-foot (160 m) span was the longest vertical-lift vehicular span in the world. Green Bus Lines extended its Rockaway route (the current Q35 bus) across the bridge to Flatbush on the day of the bridge's opening.

The bridge's opening spurred a wave of real-estate sales in Flatbush. However, it also increased the amount of vehicular traffic to the Rockaways, which already had a severe traffic congestion problem.

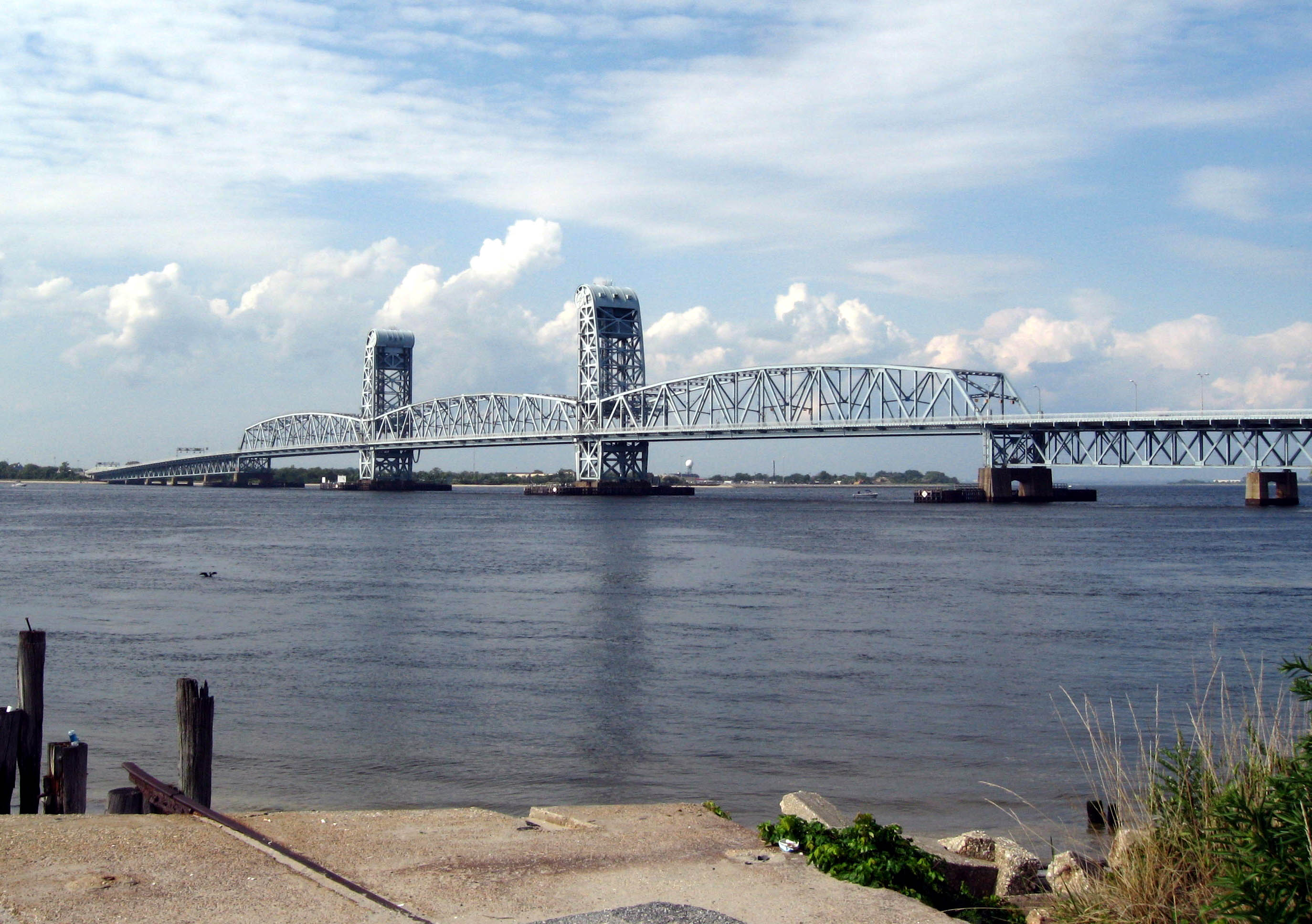
From Riis Landing

=== Later years ===
The bridge saw 1.7 million vehicles in 1938, its first full year of operation. By 1940, the Marine Parkway Bridge had recorded 4 million crossings. Following the 1940 merger of the Marine Parkway Authority and Triborough Bridge and Tunnel Authority, the operation of the bridge fell to the latter. On the bridge's 20th anniversary, The Wave of Long Island noted that 80 million vehicles had crossed the Marine Parkway Bridge since opening.

On April 4, 1978, the bridge connecting Brooklyn and Queens was renamed for Gil Hodges, the former championship-winning first baseman for the Brooklyn Dodgers who later won a World Series as the manager of the Queens-based New York Mets. It was believed to be the first bridge to be named for a major sports figure.

From 1999 to 2001, the bridge received a renovation. The four lanes were widened by placing the pedestrian walkway on the outside of the superstructure. The existing steel-grated roadway deck on the lift span was replaced with a new steel grating. A Jersey barrier was also installed to separate opposing traffic flows. In addition, the elevators and electrical systems in the two towers were replaced, and new variable message signs and traffic control devices were installed on the bridge, approach roadways, and toll plaza. The walkway on the bridge was closed temporarily so the roadway could be widened.

Part of the crash of American Airlines Flight 587 in 2001 was filmed from a tollbooth camera on this bridge.

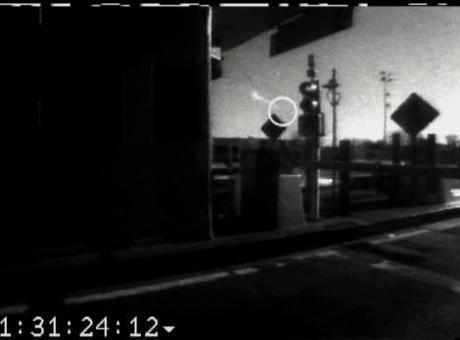
American Airlines Flight 587 (circled in white) is briefly seen in this video, moving downward with a white streak behind it. This video, released by the NTSB, was recorded by a toll-booth camera located on the bridge.

== Description ==
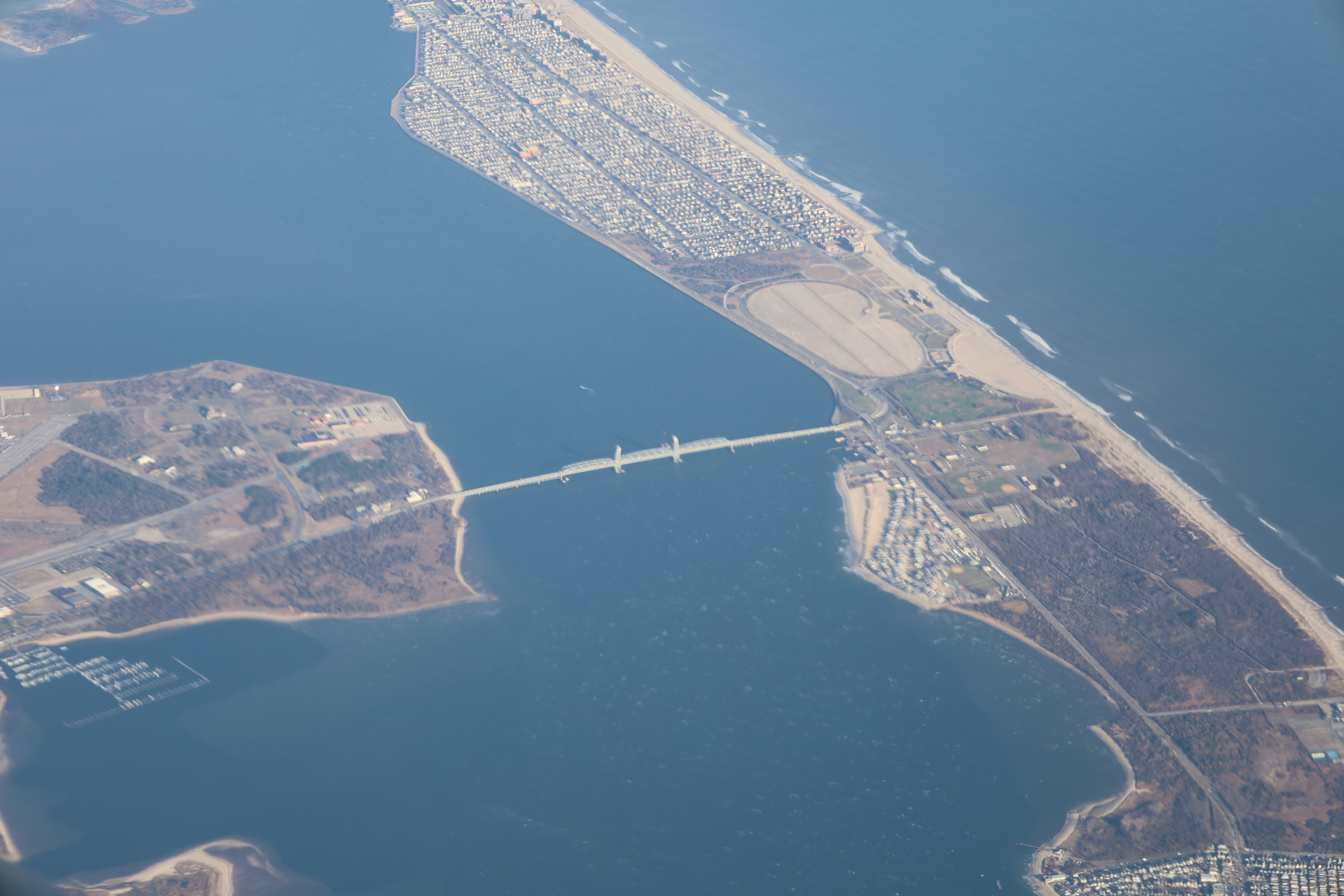
Aerial view of the bridge in 2021

The Marine Parkway Bridge carries four motor traffic lanes, and a footpath on the western edge. Originally, the bridge only had two lanes – one in each direction.

The entirety of the bridge, including approaches, is 4,022 feet (1,226 m) long. The main part of the Marine Parkway Bridge consists of three spans with an aggregate length of 1,500 feet (460 m). The center span is 540 feet long, weighs 3,600 tons, and is located 55 feet (17 m) above water level in the bridge's "closed" position. When the Marine Parkway Bridge is in the "open" position, the center span can be raised to a height of 140 feet (43 m) to allow vessels to pass beneath the roadway. The bridge was raised 157 times in 2006.

The curled tops of the Marine Parkway Bridge's towers were designed to give the bridge a whimsical aspect.

== Tolls ==
As of January 4, 2026, drivers pay $6.02 per car or $5.06 per motorcycle for tolls by mail/non-NYCSC E-Z Pass. E-ZPass users with transponders issued by the New York E‑ZPass Customer Service Center pay $2.80 per car or $2.33 per motorcycle. Mid-Tier NYCSC E-Z Pass users pay $4.42 per car or $3.72 per motorcycle. All E-ZPass users with transponders not issued by the New York E-ZPass CSC will be required to pay Toll-by-mail rates.

When the bridge opened, passenger automobiles were charged a toll of 15 cents. When the Cross Bay Bridge was opened in 1939, the toll for passenger cars and motorcycles was lowered to 10 cents to match that of the Cross Bay Bridge. Tolls for all other vehicle classes remained as before. Since 1993, residents of the Rockaways have received discounts on tolls for the Marine Parkway Bridge and Cross Bay Veterans Memorial Bridge. The tollbooths for the Marine Parkway Bridge were configured to collect tolls electronically from E-ZPass transponders in 1996.

Open-road cashless tolling began on April 30, 2017. The tollbooths were dismantled, and drivers are no longer able to pay cash at the bridge. Instead, cameras and E-ZPass readers are mounted on new overhead gantries manufactured by TransCore near where the booths were located. A vehicle without E-ZPass has a picture taken of its license plate and a bill for the toll is mailed to its owner. For E-ZPass users, sensors detect their transponders wirelessly. Residents with leftover bridge tokens would be eligible to redeem their tokens for a refund.

== Incidents ==
One person was killed in a three-car accident on the bridge on June 3, 1951. Another fatal accident on the bridge on July 14, 1963, killed two and injured seven.

On April 10, 1957, a gate for the Marine Parkway Bridge's drawbridge span was being lowered when it hit a bus, injuring four passengers.

On November 24, 2014, the bridge experienced a power failure while it was raised to let a boat pass. It remained stuck in the raised position for about six hours before technicians were able to lower it.

== See also ==
- List of reference routes in New York
- Cross Bay Veterans Memorial Bridge
- Joseph P. Addabbo Memorial Bridge
