= Rockaway Inlet =

Strait in New York City

Coordinates: 40.5732°N 73.9136°W

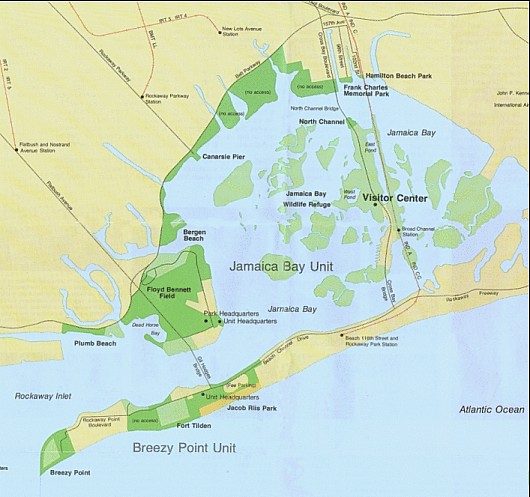
Map of Rockaway Inlet

Rockaway Inlet is a strait connecting Jamaica Bay, wholly within New York City, with the Atlantic Ocean. It separates the Rockaway Peninsula in Queens from the Floyd Bennett Field (formerly Barren Island) in Brooklyn.

== Description ==
Rockaway Inlet is bounded by Brooklyn to the north and Rockaway Peninsula to the south. It is the entrance to Jamaica Bay, and most of the inlet is within the boundary of Gateway National Recreation Area. Its entrance is marked by a light on a jetty extending southward from Rockaway Point. The entrance channel extends westward of the jetty and is marked by lighted buoys. It has a depth of about 15 feet midchannel with a shoal of only one foot. In 1968 a light failed and the tanker Mary A. Whalen ran aground, resulting in a case entitled United States v. Reliable Transfer Co. about dividing damage payments.

The inlet is spanned by the Marine Parkway–Gil Hodges Memorial Bridge.

== Rockaway Ferry ==
In June 2005, New York Representative Anthony D. Weiner requested three new ferries be set up for service in Rockway Inlet for 15 million dollars. On May 12, 2008, the first ferry of the inlet was set up, creating a path of commute between Breezy Point in Rockway and Lower Manhattan.

== See also ==
- East Rockaway Inlet, separating the peninsula from Atlantic Beach.
