= Flogging a dead horse =

Idiom about futile effort

- A man sits atop a dead horse in Sheboygan, Wisconsin. The idiom "to beat a dead horse" originated from the fact that flogging a dead horse will not compel it to do useful work.
- Meaning: An idiom highlighting the futility of one's effort

Flogging a dead horse (or beating a dead horse in American English) is an idiom meaning that a particular effort is futile.

== Early usage ==
The expression is said to have been popularized by the English politician and orator John Bright. Speaking in the House of Commons in March 1859 on Bright's efforts to promote parliamentary reform, Lord Elcho remarked that Bright had not been "satisfied with the results of his winter campaign" and that "a saying was attributed to him [Bright] that he [had] found he was 'flogging a dead horse'."

The earliest instance cited in the Oxford English Dictionary dates from 1872, when The Globe newspaper, reporting the Prime Minister, William Gladstone's, futile efforts to defend the Ecclesiastical Courts and Registries Bill in the Commons, observed that he "might be said to have rehearsed that particularly lively operation known as flogging a dead horse".

== Earlier related terms ==
The phrase may have originated in 17th-century slang, when a horse symbolized hard work. A "dead horse" came to mean something that had become useless. In gambling, "playing a dead horse" meant wagering on something, such as a hand of cards, that was almost sure to lose. In a 17th-century quote from a collection of documents owned by the late Earl of Oxford, Edward Harley,

Sir Humphry Foster had lost the greatest part of his estate, and then, playing, as it is said, for a dead horse, did, by happy fortune, recover it again.

In journeyman printer's slang from the 18th and 19th centuries, work that was charged for on a bill, but not yet carried out, was called "horse". Carrying out that work was said to be "working for a dead horse", since no additional benefit would be gained by the labourer when the work was complete.

Many sailors were paid in advance for their first month's work. In his book Old England and New Zealand, author Alfred Simmons gives a detailed explanation and background of the "Flogging the Dead Horse" ceremony, performed by a ship's crew at the end of the first month of their voyage at which time wages resumed. The sailors would get paid in advance of leaving the harbour, spend their money, and embark the ship with nothing. This situation allowed them to exclaim that the horse, symbolising their usual hard work and without money for motivation, was dead. However, once a month had passed, the sailors would have reached the horse latitudes, where wages due and paid would prompt the horse to "live" again.

One of the earliest synonyms may be found in an ancient Greek play by Sophocles, Antigone,

Nay, allow the claim of the dead; stab not the fallen; what prowess is it to slay the slain anew?

== Criticism and proposed replacement by PETA ==
In 2018, the organization People for the Ethical Treatment of Animals (PETA) campaigned for the general public to cease usage of the idiom, along with other idioms which mentioned animals, to "remove speciesism from daily conversation". As an alternative, PETA proposed that the general public replace "beating a dead horse" with "feeding a fed horse". PETA justified the replacement by claiming on Twitter that in the same way, "as it became unacceptable to use racist, homophobic, or ableist language, phrases that trivialize cruelty to animals will vanish as more people begin to appreciate animals for who they are and start 'bringing home the bagels' instead of the bacon."

PETA faced ridicule for the suggestion, such as from late night comedy hosts, Stephen Colbert and Seth Meyers.
