= Mercedes Narcisse =

American politician

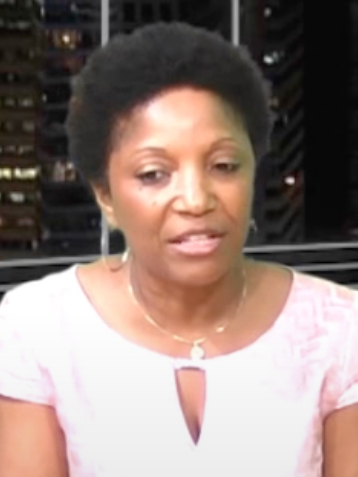

Member of the New York City Council from the 46th district
- Incumbent
- Assumed office January 1, 2022
- Preceded by: Alan Maisel

Personal details
- Born: April 26, 1965 (age 61) Saint-Marc, Haiti
- Party: Democratic
- Education: St. Joseph's University; Grand Canyon University (BS)
- Website: Official website Campaign website

Mercedes Narcisse (born April 26, 1965) is a Haitian American nurse and Democratic politician from New York City currently serving as the New York City Council Member representing Brooklyn's 46th City Council District covering the neighborhoods of Bergen Beach, Canarsie, Flatlands, Georgetown, Gerritsen Beach, Marine Park, Mill Basin, Mill Island, Sheepshead Bay in southeastern Brooklyn.

== Early life ==
Narcisse was born in Saint-Marc, Haiti, and was raised by her grandmother. When she was 17 years old, Narcisse moved to Brooklyn to live with her father, and attended Samuel J. Tilden High School despite initially not knowing any English. She then graduated from the New York City College of Technology to become certified as a registered nurse.

== Career ==
Narcisse has worked as a registered nurse for over 30 years, and established her own medical practice in 2001.

=== 2009 City Council campaign ===
In June 2008, with Councilman Lew Fidler prospectively term-limited in 2009, Narcisse announced her campaign for the 46th district of the New York City Council. The election was expected to be a contest between Narcisse and former Assemblyman Frank Seddio, who had once been Narcisse's political ally and was the godfather to one of her children. However, in October 2008, Mayor Michael Bloomberg and the City Council agreed to extend the city's term limits law, allowing Fidler to run for a third term; Seddio and Narcisse both chose to discontinue their campaigns.

=== 2012 and 2013 City Council campaigns ===
When Fidler ran for the 27th district of the New York State Senate in a 2012 special election, both Narcisse and Seddio prepared for another run for his City Council seat. Fidler lost the special election to Republican David Storobin by 13 votes, however, and thus remained in the 46th district seat until his final term ended. Narcisse continued running for the soon-to-be open seat, but Seddio halted his campaign, and Narcisse instead faced Assemblyman Alan Maisel, a Seddio ally. Although Maisel was white and the 46th district was plurality-Black, Narcisse could not overcome Maisel's name recognition and connections, and lost 60-40%.

=== 2016 State Senate campaign ===
Narcisse launched her third campaign for elected office in 2016, this time for the 19th district of the State Senate. The seat was held by Roxanne Persaud, who had won a special election after the previous incumbent, John Sampson, had been convicted on federal felony charges. Narcisse won the backing of Councilwoman Inez Barron, who sought to challenge the Brooklyn machine from the left, but nevertheless lost to Persaud in a 75-25% landslide.

=== 2021 City Council campaign ===
With her former opponent Alan Maisel term-limited in 2021, Narcisse announced her latest campaign for the City Council's 46th district. As in her previous runs, Narcisse ran without the support of the Brooklyn Democratic political apparatus, which instead aligned behind community board member Gardy Brazela. Narcisse did earn notable endorsements from several major unions and Public Advocate Jumaane Williams, and was seen as one of the race's frontrunners and its most progressive viable candidate.

On election night on June 22, Narcisse emerged with a large lead, receiving 36 percent of the vote to her nearest competitor's 16 percent. When absentee ballots and ranked-choice votes were counted two weeks later, Narcisse defeated runner-up Shirley Paul 64-36%; she declared victory on July 3. She won the November general election with over 63% of the vote and took office on January 1, 2022.

In 2024, Narcisse said she was against the City of Yes, a proposed zoning change that would have eliminated parking mandates for new housing units.

== Personal life ==
Narcisse lives in Canarsie. She has four children.

== Electoral history ==
=== 2025 ===
2025 New York City Council Democratic primary, District 46
Party	Candidate	Votes	%
Democratic	Mercedes Narcisse (incumbent)	13,389	82.9
Democratic	R. Dimple Willabus	2,712	16.8
Write-in		53	0.3
Total votes		16,154	100.0

2025 New York City Council election, District 46
Party	Candidate	Votes	%
Democratic	Mercedes Narcisse (incumbent)	26,687	67.6
Republican	Athena A. Clarke	10,938	27.7
Conservative	R. Dimple Willabus	1,808	4.6
Write-in		68	0.2
Total votes		39,501	100.0
Democratic hold			

=== 2023 ===
2023 New York City Council election, District 46
Party	Candidate	Votes	%
Democratic	Mercedes Narcisse (incumbent)	7,428	65.3
Republican	Michael J. Moran	3,088	27.1
Conservative	Michael J. Moran	571	5.0
Total	Michael J. Moran	3,659	32.2
Kebreau 4 Council	Adlerette Kebreau	221	1.9
Write-in		73	0.6
Total votes		11,381	100.0
Democratic hold			

=== 2021 ===
2021 New York City Council Democratic primary, District 46
Party	Candidate	Maximum round	Maximum votes	Share in maximum round	Maximum votes First round votes Transfer votes
Democratic	Mercedes Narcisse	7	8,940	63.7%	
Democratic	Shirley S. Paul	7	5,094	36.3%	
Democratic	Gardy Brazela	6	3,668	23.4%	
Democratic	Donald J. Cranston	5	2,791	16.3%	
Democratic	Judy D. Newton	4	1,905	10.8%	
Democratic	R. Dimple Willabus	3	1,445	8.0%	
Democratic	Tiffany Pryor	2	550	3.0%	
Democratic	Zuri S. Jackson	2	428	2.3%	
Write-In		1	58	0.3%	

2021 New York City Council election, District 46
Party	Candidate	Votes	%
Democratic	Mercedes Narcisse	16,813	63.2
Republican	Donald J. Cranston	8,610	32.4
Conservative	Donald J. Cranston	1,157	4.3
Total	Donald J. Cranston	9,767	36.7
Write-in		28	0.1
Total votes		26,608	100.0
Democratic hold			

=== 2016 ===
2016 New York State Senate Democratic primary, District 19
Party	Candidate	Votes	%
Democratic	Roxanne J. Persaud (incumbent)	10,358	75.7
Democratic	Mercedes Narcisse	3,284	24.0
Write-in		32	0.2
Total votes		13,674	100.0

=== 2013 ===
2013 New York City Council Democratic primary, District 46
Party	Candidate	Votes	%
Democratic	Alan N. Maisel	8,387	59.6
Democratic	Mercedes Narcisse	5,669	40.3
Write-in		8	0.1
Total votes		14,064	100.0

Political offices
Preceded by Alan Maisel	Member of the New York City Council from the 46th district 2022–present	Incumbent
