= New York's 59th State Assembly district =

American legislative district

Assemblymember
Jaime Williams; D–Canarsie

New York's 59th State Assembly district is one of the 150 districts in the New York State Assembly. It has been represented by Democrat Jaime Williams since 2016, replacing Roxanne Persaud.

== Geography ==
District 59 is in Brooklyn, and encompasses portions of Canarsie, Georgetown, Plumb Beach, Mill Basin, Marine Park and Gerritsen Beach. Floyd Bennett Field is also located within the district.

The district is (partially) overlapped by New York's 8th and 9th congressional districts, as well as the 19th, 20th, and 22nd districts of the New York State Senate and the 42nd, 45th and 46th districts of the New York City Council.

== Recent election results ==
=== 2026 ===
2026 New York State Assembly election, District 59
Primary election
Party	Candidate	Votes	%
Democratic	Jaime Williams (incumbent)	4,277	66.0
Democratic	Jibreel Jalloh	2,189	33.8
Write-in		15	0.2
Total votes		6,481	100.0
General election
Democratic	Jaime Williams		
Conservative	Jaime Williams		
Total	Jaime Williams (incumbent)		
Working Families	Jibreel Jalloh		
Write-in			
Total votes			100.0

=== 2024 ===
2024 New York State Assembly election, District 59
Party	Candidate	Votes	%
Democratic	Jaime Williams	29,237	
Republican	Jaime Williams	10,147	
Conservative	Jaime Williams	1,646	
Total	Jaime Williams (incumbent)	41,030	99.5
Write-in		190	0.5
Total votes		41,220	100.0
Democratic hold			

=== 2022 ===
2022 New York State Assembly election, District 59
Party	Candidate	Votes	%
Democratic	Jaime Williams	19,456	
Working Families	Jaime Williams	2,161	
Total	Jaime Williams (incumbent)	21,617	98.7
Write-in		286	1.3
Total votes		21,903	100.0
Democratic hold			

=== 2020 ===
2020 New York State Assembly election, District 59
Party	Candidate	Votes	%
Democratic	Jaime Williams (incumbent)	38,846	99.0
Write-in		398	1.0
Total votes		39,244	100.0
Democratic hold			

=== 2018 ===
2018 New York State Assembly election, District 59
Party	Candidate	Votes	%
Democratic	Jaime Williams	26,919	
Working Families	Jaime Williams	605	
Total	Jaime Williams (incumbent)	27,524	80.9
Republican	Brandon Washington	5,767	
Conservative	Brandon Washington	718	
Total	Brandon Washington	6,485	19.1
Write-in		10	0.0
Total votes		34,019	100.0
Democratic hold			

=== 2016 ===
2016 New York State Assembly election, District 59
Party	Candidate	Votes	%
Democratic	Jaime Williams	32,365	
Working Families	Jaime Williams	964	
Total	Jaime Williams (incumbent)	33,329	78.0
Republican	Jeffrey Ferretti	7,922	
Conservative	Jeffrey Ferretti	1,426	
Total	Jeffrey Ferretti	9,348	21.9
Write-in		41	0.1
Total votes		42,718	100.0
Democratic hold			

=== 2016 special ===
Incumbent Roxanne Persaud resigned on November 4, 2015 following her election to the New York State Senate, triggering a special election. In special elections for state legislative offices, primaries are usually not held – county committee members and district leaders for each party select nominees.

2016 New York State Assembly special election, District 59
Party	Candidate	Votes	%
Democratic	Jaime Williams	14,423	
Women's Equality	Jaime Williams	333	
Independence	Jaime Williams	318	
Total	Jaime Williams	15,074	82.5
Republican	Jeffrey Ferretti	2,558	
Conservative	Jeffrey Ferretti	532	
Reform	Jeffrey Ferretti	97	
Total	Jeffrey Ferretti	3,187	17.4
Write-in		21	0.1
Total votes		18,282	100.0
Democratic hold			

=== 2014 ===
2014 New York State Assembly election, District 59
Party	Candidate	Votes	%
Democratic	Roxanne Persaud	11,395	73.6
Republican	Jeffrey Ferretti	2,789	
Conservative	Jeffrey Ferretti	1,290	
Total	Jeffrey Ferretti	4,079	26.3
Write-in		11	0.1
Total votes		15,485	100.0
Democratic hold			

=== 2012 ===
2012 New York State Assembly election, District 59
Party	Candidate	Votes	%
Democratic	Alan Maisel (incumbent)	31,273	91.4
Conservative	Robert Maresca	2,921	8.5
Write-in		20	0.1
Total votes		34,214	100.0
Democratic hold			

=== 2010 ===
2010 New York State Assembly election, District 59
Party	Candidate	Votes	%
Democratic	Alan Maisel (incumbent)	16,332	86.0
Conservative	Robert Maresca	2,656	14.0
Write-in		2	0.0
Total votes		18,990	100.0
Democratic hold			

=== 2008 ===
2008 New York State Assembly election, District 59
Primary election
Party	Candidate	Votes	%
Democratic	Alan Maisel (incumbent)	3,262	78.2
Democratic	Harvey Clarke	910	21.8
Write-in		2	0.0
Total votes		4,174	100.0
General election
Democratic	Alan Maisel (incumbent)	24,659	94.9
Conservative	Edward Bracken	1,316	5.1
Write-in		3	0.0
Total votes		25,978	100.0
Democratic hold			

=== 2006 general ===
2006 New York State Assembly election, District 59
Primary election
Party	Candidate	Votes	%
Democratic	Alan Maisel (incumbent)	3,568	71.7
Democratic	Abraham Levy	1,406	28.3
Write-in		0	0.0
Total votes		4,974	100.0
General election
Democratic	Alan Maisel (incumbent)	12,427	93.5
Conservative	Stephen Walters	871	6.5
Write-in		0	0.0
Total votes		13,298	100.0
Democratic hold			

=== 2006 special ===
Incumbent Frank Seddio resigned on December 31, 2005 after he was elected Kings County Surrogate Court Judge, triggering a special election. In special elections for state legislative offices, primaries are usually not held – county committee members and district leaders for each party select nominees. Election was held on February 28, 2006.

2006 New York State Assembly special election, District 59
Party	Candidate	Votes	%
Democratic	Alan Maisel	1,932	84.9
Conservative	Alice Gaffney	202	8.9
Republican	Ronald Haugstatter	141	6.2
Write-in		0	0.0
Total votes		2,275	100.0
Democratic hold			

=== 2004 ===
2004 New York State Assembly election, District 59
Party	Candidate	Votes	%
Democratic	Frank Seddio	20,199	
Republican	Frank Seddio	7,929	
Independence	Frank Seddio	360	
Total	Frank Seddio (incumbent)	28,488	96.6
Conservative	Robert Mahoney	990	3.4
Write-in		0	0.0
Total votes		29,478	100.0
Democratic hold			

=== 2002 ===
2002 New York State Assembly election, District 59
Party	Candidate	Votes	%
Democratic	Frank Seddio	11,878	
Independence	Frank Seddio	436	
Total	Frank Seddio	12,314	74.5
Republican	Peter Evangelista	3,701	
Conservative	Peter Evangelista	520	
Total	Peter Evangelista	4,221	25.5
Write-in		0	0.0
Total votes		16,535	100.0
Democratic win (new boundaries)			

=== 2000 ===
2000 New York State Assembly election, District 59
Party	Candidate	Votes	%
Democratic	John Lavelle	19,202	
Independence	John Lavelle	465	
Total	John Lavelle (incumbent)	19,667	53.5
Republican	Robert Helbock	13,362	
Conservative	Robert Helbock	1,486	
Right to Life	Robert Helbock	765	
Total	Robert Helbock	15,613	42.4
Working Families	Raymond Jorgensen	739	2.0
Green	Franklin Hurd	475	1.3
Liberal	Michael Veasey	287	0.8
Write-in		0	0.0
Total votes		36,781	100.0
Democratic hold			

=== Federal results in Assembly District 59 ===
Year	Office	Results
2024	President	Harris 67.4 - 31.8%
2024	Senate	Gillibrand 70.0 - 29.5%
2022	Senate	Schumer 67.0 - 32.7%
2020	President	Biden 75.3 - 23.9%
2018	Senate	Gillibrand 81.3 - 18.7%
2016	President	Clinton 74.4 - 23.5%
2016	Senate	Schumer 85.2 - 13.5%
2012	President	Obama 79.7 - 19.9%
2012	Senate	Gillibrand 85.5 - 13.9%
