= Jaime Williams =

American politician

Member of the New York State Assembly from the 59th district
- Incumbent
- Assumed office May 10, 2016
- Preceded by: Roxanne Persaud

Personal details
- Born: August 24, 1979 (age 46) Trinidad and Tobago
- Party: Democratic
- Education: York College (BA); Fordham University (MA)
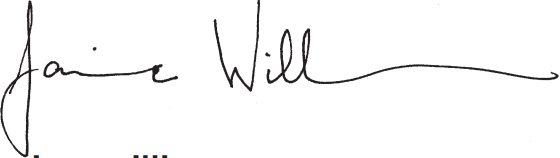
- Signature
- Website: State Assembly website

Jaime R. Williams (born August 24, 1979) is the Assembly member for the 59th district of the New York State Assembly. She is a Democrat. The district includes portions of Canarsie, Georgetown, Mill Basin, Marine Park, and Gerritsen Beach in Brooklyn.

== Early life and career ==
Williams was born and raised in Trinidad and Tobago before immigrating to New York City in 1999, where she has been a resident of Brooklyn ever since. Williams graduated from Fordham University with a master's degree in social work before going to work in the community, including for domestic violence prevention.

Following Hurricane Sandy, Williams worked for Catholic Social Services of Brooklyn and Queens to help with relief efforts. She joined the staff of Assemblywoman Roxanne Persaud following her election in 2014 as her Chief of Staff.

== New York State Assembly ==
In 2015, Williams was selected by the Kings County Democratic Party to run in the special election for Roxanne Persaud’s Assembly seat after she was elected to the New York Senate in a November 2015 special election caused by John L. Sampson’s corruption-related resignation. In April 2016, Williams won the special election against Republican Jeffrey Feretti with 82.47% of the vote.

=== Tenure ===
Williams was seated in the Assembly on May 10, 2016. She introduced two bills following her swearing in; one which would require landlords to inform tenants if their rental home was in foreclosure and one to amend environmental laws to protect bluefish.

In August 2023, Williams organized a protest against the planned construction of a migrant shelter on Floyd Bennett Field. The following month, Williams was invited by Republicans to testify before a House Natural Resources Committee oversight hearing titled "Destroying America’s Best Idea: Examining the Biden Administration’s Use of National Park Service Lands for Migrant Camps." She spoke about her opposition to the planned shelter and joined a lawsuit alongside Republican New York City Councilmember Joann Ariola to block it. Alexandria Ocasio-Cortez tweeted a video of an exchange between them, captioning it "Republicans have no solutions for immigration" despite Williams being a Democrat.

In 2024, Williams was the only Democrat to vote against overriding the New York Independent Redistricting Commission's congressional redistricting lines. Williams opposed the City of Yes upzoning program and supported Republican Curtis Sliwa in the 2025 NYC mayoral election.
