= Anthony J. Genovesi =

American politician

Anthony Genovesi

Member of the New York State Assembly from the 39th district
- In office January 1, 1987 – December 31, 1998
- Preceded by: Stanley Fink
- Succeeded by: Frank Seddio

Personal details
- Born: December 8, 1936 Brooklyn, New York, U.S.
- Died: August 10, 1998 (aged 61) Pawling, New York, U.S.
- Party: Democratic
- Education: Saint Peter’s College (BS); Fordham University (LL.B)

Anthony Joseph Genovesi (December 8, 1936 – August 10, 1998) was an American lawyer and politician from New York.

== Life ==
Genovesi was born on December 8, 1936 in Brooklyn, New York. After graduating from Xavier High School, he received his B.S. in economics from Saint Peter's College in 1958 and an LL.B. from Fordham Law School in 1961. Upon receiving his law degree, he completed his military service obligation as an officer in the United States Army Judge Advocate General's Corps. Afterwards he practiced law in Canarsie, Brooklyn. He married Joyce Khanisur (b. 1937), and they had five children

He entered politics as a Democrat, and became a top aide of Assembly Speaker Stanley Fink. Genovesi was a member of the New York State Assembly (39th D.) from 1987 until his death in 1998, sitting in the 187th, 188th, 189th, 190th, 191st and 192nd New York State Legislatures.

He died shortly before midnight on August 10, 1998, in a car accident on New York State Route 22 in Pawling, Dutchess County, New York, while returning from the Berkshires; and was buried at the Corashire Cemetery in Monterey, Massachusetts.

New York State Assembly
Preceded by Stanley Fink	New York State Assembly; 39th District; 1987–1998	Succeeded by Frank Seddio
