= Alan Maisel =

American politician

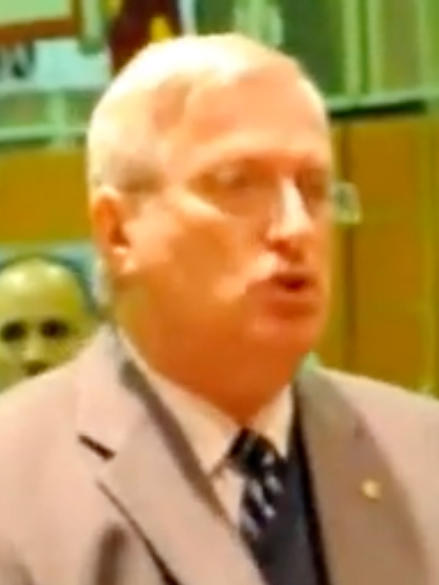
- Maisel in 2010

Member of the New York City Council from the 46th district
- In office January 1, 2014 – December 31, 2021
- Preceded by: Lewis A. Fidler
- Succeeded by: Mercedes Narcisse

Member of the New York Assembly from the 59th district
- In office February 28, 2006 – December 31, 2013
- Preceded by: Frank Seddio
- Succeeded by: Roxanne Persaud

Personal details
- Born: July 25, 1945 (age 81) Brooklyn, New York
- Party: Democratic
- Spouse: Lynn Maisel
- Children: 2
- Education: Long Island University (B.A.), (M.A.)
- Website: Official website

Alan N. Maisel (born July 25, 1946) is an American politician who served in the New York City Council for the 46th district from 2014 to 2021. He is a Democrat. He formerly represented the 59th district of the New York State Assembly from 2006 to 2013.

The district includes Bergen Beach, Canarsie, East Flatbush, Flatlands, Floyd Bennett Field, Gerritsen Beach, Marine Park, Mill Basin, Plumb Beach and Sheepshead Bay in Brooklyn.

== Life and career ==
Maisel is a lifelong resident of Brooklyn and graduated from the Brooklyn Center of Long Island University with a B.A. in History and an M.A. in Urban Studies. He also holds an Advanced Certificate of Administration and Supervision in Education from Brooklyn College.

Prior to his election to the Assembly, Maisel served as a member of Community Board #18. Prior to that he served as an Administrative Assistant to Congressman Charles Schumer and Chief of Staff to Assemblyman Frank R. Seddio, who preceded him in office. He also served as the Assistant Director of the New York State Legislative Task Force on Reapportionment from 1972 to 1982. He is also a retired school principal and public school teacher.

Maisel and his wife Lynn have two children, Terry and Lauren.

== New York City Council ==
In 2013, Maisel opted to seek a seat on the New York City Council to succeed Lewis A. Fidler. He easily won the Democratic nomination, and went on to win the general election as well. He took his seat on January 1, 2014.

Election history
Location	Year	Election	Results
NY Assembly District 59	2006	Special	√ Alan Maisel (D) 84.92% Alice G. Gaffney (Conservative) 8.88% Ronald G. Haugstatter (R) 6.20%
NY Assembly District 59	2006	Democratic Primary	√ Alan Maisel 71.73% Abraham Levy 28.27%
NY Assembly District 59	2006	General	√ Alan Maisel 93.45% Stephen Walters (Conservative) 6.55%
NY Assembly District 59	2008	Democratic Primary	√ Alan Maisel 76.85% Harvey-Roy "H.R." Clarke 23.15%
NY Assembly District 59	2008	General	√ Alan Maisel (D) 94.93% Edward P. Bracken (Conservative) 5.07%
NY Assembly District 59	2010	General	√ Alan Maisel (D) 86.00% Robert Maresca (Conservative) 13.99%
NY Assembly District 59	2012	General	√ Alan Maisel (D) 91.40% Robert Maresca (Conservative) 8.54%
NYC Council District 46	2013	Democratic Primary	√ Alan Maisel 59.67% Mercedes Narcisse 40.33%
NYC Council District 46	2013	General	√ Alan Maisel (D) 80.35% Anthony Testaverde (R) 19.50%
NYC Council District 46	2017	General	√ Alan Maisel (D) 84.15% Jeffrey J. Ferretti (Conservative) 15.68%

Political offices
Preceded by Lewis A. Fidler	New York City Council, 46th district 2014–2021	Succeeded by Mercedes Narcisse
Preceded by Frank Seddio	New York State Assembly, 59th district 2006-2013	Succeeded by Roxanne Persaud
