= New York City's 46th City Council district =

- Boundaries following the 2020 census

Government
  - Councilmember: . Mercedes Narcisse. D–Canarsie

Population (2010)
  - Total: 165,679

Demographics
  - White: 43%
  - Black: 42%
  - Hispanic: 7%
  - Asian: 6%
  - Other: 2%

Registration
  - Democratic: 68.5%
  - Republican: 11.6%
  - No party preference: 17.0%
- Registered voters (2021) 116,462

New York City's 46th City Council district is one of 51 districts in the New York City Council. It has been represented by Democrat Mercedes Narcisse since 2022. She succeeds Alan Maisel, who could not run again in 2021 due to term limits.

== Geography ==
District 46 covers a series of neighborhoods in southeastern Brooklyn along Jamaica Bay, including Canarsie, Bergen Beach, Mill Basin, Gerritsen Beach, Georgetown, and parts of Marine Park, Flatlands, and Sheepshead Bay. Marine Park – the park, not the neighborhood – is also located within the district, as is Floyd Bennett Field.

The district overlaps with Brooklyn Community Boards 15 and 18, and with New York's 8th and 9th congressional districts. It also overlaps with the 19th, 21st, and 22nd districts of the New York State Senate, and with the 41st, 58th, 59th, and 60th districts of the New York State Assembly.

== Members representing the district ==
Members	Party	Years served	Electoral history
District established January 1, 1992
Herbert Berman (Sheepshead Bay)	Democratic	January 1, 1992 – December 31, 2001	Redistricted from the 23rd district and re-elected in 1991. Re-elected 1993. Re-elected in 1997. Termed out.
Lewis A. Fidler (Sheepshead Bay)	Democratic	January 1, 2002 – December 31, 2013	Elected in 2001. Re-elected in 2003. Re-elected in 2005. Re-elected in 2009. Termed out.
Alan Maisel (Flatlands)	Democratic	January 1, 2014 – December 31, 2021	Elected in 2013. Re-elected in 2017. Termed out.
Mercedes Narcisse (Canarsie)	Democratic	January 1, 2022 –	Elected in 2021. Re-elected in 2023. Re-elected in 2025.

== Recent election results ==
=== 2025 ===
2025 New York City Council election, District 46
Primary election
Party	Candidate	Votes	%
Democratic	Mercedes Narcisse (incumbent)	13,389	82.9
Democratic	R. Dimple Willabus	2,712	16.8
Write-in		53	0.3
Total votes		16,154	100.0
General election
Democratic	Mercedes Narcisse (incumbent)	26,687	67.6
Republican	Athena Clarke	10,938	27.6
Conservative	R. Dimple Willabus	1,808	4.6
Write-in		68	0.2
Total votes		39,501	100.0
Democratic hold			

=== 2023 (redistricting) ===
Due to redistricting and the 2020 changes to the New York City Charter, councilmembers elected during the 2021 and 2023 City Council elections will serve two-year terms, with full four-year terms resuming after the 2025 New York City Council elections.

2023 New York City Council election, District 46
Party	Candidate	Votes	%
Democratic	Mercedes Narcisse (incumbent)	7,428	65.3
Republican	Michael Moran	3,088	
Conservative	Michael Moran	571	
Total	Michael Moran	3,659	32.2
Kebreau 4 Council	Adlerette Kebreau	221	1.9
Write-in		73	0.6
Total votes		11,381	100.0
Democratic hold			

=== 2021 ===
In 2019, voters in New York City approved Ballot Question 1, which implemented ranked-choice voting in all local elections. Under the new system, voters have the option to rank up to five candidates for every local office. Voters whose first-choice candidates fare poorly will have their votes redistributed to other candidates in their ranking until one candidate surpasses the 50 percent threshold. If one candidate surpasses 50 percent in first-choice votes, then ranked-choice tabulations will not occur.

2021 New York City Council election, District 46 Democratic primary
Party	Candidate	Maximum round	Maximum votes	Share in maximum round	Maximum votes First round votes Transfer votes
Democratic	Mercedes Narcisse	7	8,940	63.7%	
Democratic	Shirley Paul	7	5,094	36.3%	
Democratic	Gardy Brazela	6	3,668	23.4%	
Democratic	Donald Cranston	5	2,791	16.3%	
Democratic	Judy Newton	4	1,905	10.8%	
Democratic	R. Dimple Willabus	3	1,445	8.0%	
Democratic	Tiffany Pryor	2	550	3.0%	
Democratic	Zuri Jackson-Woods	2	428	2.3%	
Write-in		1	58	0.3%	

An interactive map of District 46

2021 New York City Council election, District 46 general election
Party	Candidate	Votes	%
Democratic	Mercedes Narcisse	16,813	63.2
Republican	Donald Cranston	8,610	
Conservative	Donald Cranston	1,157	
Total	Donald Cranston	9,767	36.7
Write-in		28	0.1
Total votes		26,608	100
Democratic hold			

=== 2017 ===
2017 New York City Council election, District 46
Party	Candidate	Votes	%
Democratic	Alan Maisel (incumbent)	21,457	84.1
Conservative	Jeffrey Ferretti	3,997	15.7
Write-in		43	0.2
Total votes		25,497	100
Democratic hold			

=== 2013 ===
2013 New York City Council election, District 46
Primary election
Party	Candidate	Votes	%
Democratic	Alan Maisel	8,387	59.6
Democratic	Mercedes Narcisse	5,669	40.3
Write-in		8	0.1
Total votes		14,064	100
General election
Democratic	Alan Maisel	19,765	
Working Families	Alan Maisel	526	
Total	Alan Maisel	20,291	80.2
Republican	Anthony Testaverde	3,792	
Conservative	Anthony Testaverde	998	
Independence	Anthony Testaverde	182	
Total	Anthony Testaverde	4,972	19.7
Write-in		38	0.1
Total votes		25,301	100
Democratic hold			
