= Leonard Yoswein =

American politician

Leonard E. Yoswein

Member of the New York State Assembly from the 39th district
- In office January 1, 1967 – December 31, 1968
- Preceded by: Samuel D. Wright
- Succeeded by: Stanley Fink

Member of the New York State Assembly from the 41st district
- In office January 1, 1966 – December 31, 1966
- Preceded by: District created
- Succeeded by: Stanley Steingut

Member of the New York State Assembly from Kings's 5th district
- In office January 1, 1961 – December 31, 1965
- Preceded by: James V. Mistretta
- Succeeded by: District abolished

Personal details
- Born: September 8, 1920 Manhattan, New York City, New York
- Died: February 25, 2011 (aged 90) Brooklyn, New York City, New York
- Party: Democratic

Leonard E. Yoswein (September 8, 1920 – February 25, 2011) was an American politician who served in the New York State Assembly from 1961 to 1968.

He died on February 25, 2011, in Brooklyn, New York City, New York at age 90. He was Jewish.
