= Stanley Fink =

American politician

116th Speaker of the New York State Assembly
- In office January 2, 1979 – December 31, 1986
- Governor: Hugh Carey; Mario Cuomo
- Preceded by: Stanley Steingut
- Succeeded by: Mel Miller

Member of the New York State Assembly from the 39th district
- In office January 8, 1969 – December 31, 1986
- Preceded by: Leonard E. Yoswein
- Succeeded by: Anthony J. Genovesi

Personal details
- Born: February 6, 1936 Brooklyn, New York, U.S.
- Died: March 4, 1997 (aged 61) Boston, Massachusetts, U.S.
- Party: Democratic
- Education: Brooklyn College (BA); New York University School of Law (JD)

Stanley Fink (February 6, 1936 – March 4, 1997) was an American lawyer and politician.

== Life ==
Fink was born on February 6, 1936, in Brooklyn, New York. He attended New Utrecht High School. He graduated from Brooklyn College in 1956, and from New York University School of Law in 1959. He then joined the U.S. Air Force, serving in England as a second lieutenant with the Judge Advocate General's office. He was discharged in 1962 as a captain. He returned to Brooklyn, where he practiced law and entered politics as a Democrat. He married Judith, and they had two sons: Marc Fink and Keith Fink.

In 1968, Fink was appointed as chief counsel to the Assembly's Committee on Mental Hygiene. He was a member of the New York State Assembly from 1969 to 1986, sitting in the 178th, 179th, 180th, 181st, 182nd, 183rd, 184th, 185th and 186th New York State Legislatures. He was Majority Leader in 1977 and 1978; and Speaker from 1979 to 1986.

In 1986, he decided not to seek re-election, saying he wanted to spend more time with his family and earn more money in the private sector. He joined Bower & Gardner, a Manhattan law firm, and was senior vice president for regulatory and Government affairs for NYNEX at the time of his death.

He died on March 4, 1997, in Massachusetts General Hospital in Boston, Massachusetts, of heart failure. He had been in failing health since late January when he underwent surgery for a recurrence of cancer. He was buried at the Mt. Ararat Cemetery on Long Island.

== Sources ==
- Hernandez, Raymond (March 6, 1997). "Stanley Fink, Assembly Speaker, 61, Is Dead". The New York Times.

New York State Assembly
Preceded by Leonard E. Yoswein	New York State Assembly; 39th District; 1969–1986	Succeeded by Anthony J. Genovesi
Political offices
Preceded by Albert H. Blumenthal	Majority Leader of the New York State Assembly; 1977–1978	Succeeded by Daniel B. Walsh
Preceded by Stanley Steingut	Speaker of the New York State Assembly; 1979–1986	Succeeded by Mel Miller
