= Frank Seddio =

American politician

Chair of the Kings County Democratic Committee
- In office September 19, 2012 – January 15, 2020
- Preceded by: Vito Lopez
- Succeeded by: Rodneyse Bichotte Hermelyn

Kings County Surrogate Court Judge
- In office January 2006 – May 2007

Member of the New York State Assembly
- In office January 1, 1999 – December 31, 2005
- Preceded by: Anthony J. Genovesi
- Succeeded by: Alan Maisel
- Constituency: 39th district (1999-2002); 59th district (2003-2005)

Personal details
- Born: October 14, 1946 (age 80) Brooklyn, New York, U.S.
- Party: Democratic
- Spouse: Joyce Becker-Seddio (m. 1998)
- Education: Brooklyn College; St. John's University School of Law

Frank R. Seddio (born October 14, 1946) is an American politician and lawyer who served as a member of the New York State Assembly representing southeastern Brooklyn from 1999 to 2005 before serving as a Kings County Surrogate Court Judge from 2006 to 2007.

He served as the chairman of the Brooklyn Democratic Party from 2012 to 2020, when he resigned to focus on his legal business. He remains a district leader for the 59th Assembly District, an unpaid volunteer party position he serves in since 2010.

== Early life and education ==
Seddio was one of six children in a family that lived in Canarsie, then a largely Italian and Jewish neighborhood in Brooklyn. His father was a truck driver who left the family when Seddio was 10. His mother attempted to raise the family on welfare. To assist her, Seddio went into the workforce at age 12 at a local grocery store.

Seddio is a graduate of Samuel J. Tilden High School, Brooklyn College and St. John's University School of Law.

== Career ==
=== Civil service ===
Prior to elected office, Seddio held several government positions. The first as a caretaker in the New York City Housing Authority before he served as a police liaison in the New York City Police Department for the 67th Precinct from October 1967 to May 1980. There he was tasked with overseeing the annual West Indian Day Parade in Crown Heights, starting with the inaugural one in 1969. Seddio recalled of that parade "Everybody said 'Who’s going to come to Eastern Parkway? Are you crazy?' And that first year we got 50,000 people, and now it’s the biggest parade in the city of New York."

From 1980 to 85 he served as district manager for Brooklyn Community Board 18 and later as chairman of the board from 1995 to 1998. He also served in the New York City Department of Transportation from 1985 to 1991, when he retired to start a law practice.

=== New York State Assembly ===
In 1999, Seddio succeeded Anthony Genovesi in the New York State Assembly representing the 39th Assembly District, which included parts of southeastern Brooklyn. After redistricting in 2002, the area became part of the 59th Assembly District, a district Seddio represented in the Assembly until his resignation in 2006 after he was elected Kings County Surrogate Court Judge.

=== Kings County Surrogate Court ===
Seddio was elected in 2005 to the Kings County Surrogate Court to a twelve year term. However, he resigned in May 2007 after saying the job was not “as exciting as I imagined" and amid a looming investigation in campaign fund misuse.

=== Brooklyn Democratic Party ===
Seddio was elected chairman of the Brooklyn Democratic Party in September 2012 after former Chairman Vito Lopez resigned following allegations of sexual harassment.

Unlike his predecessor, who was known to be vindictive, Seddio attempted to reach out to different factions within the party in what he called "cannoli diplomacy" saying "I would bring a couple dozen cannolis and go to their meeting and come in and get a chance to talk."

The heavy use of consultants, specifically George Artz Communications, led to accusations of mismanagement of the party's funds.

Despite resigning at party leader in 2020, he remains a district leader for the 59th Assembly District and one of the leading figures of the Thomas Jefferson Democratic Club in Canarsie, which The New York Times described as being known as "among the strong political groups in Brooklyn".

=== Private sector (2020–present) ===
==== Controversies ====
In November 2020 Seddio was seen at a birthday party without a mask with more than ten people, despite such gatherings being illegal at the time due to COVID-19 restrictions imposed by Governor Andrew Cuomo.

In August 2022, Seddio was filmed threatening an outgoing party leader, David Schwartz, at Nick's Lobster House in Marine Park, Brooklyn. As he was being held back, Seddio is heard screaming "What I am is a fucking Sicilian who will take your fucking heart out. You are absolutely done. Never fucking call me again. Don’t go call me for anything. Drop dead ... You should only suffer a terrible death."

As of May 2026, Seddio was scheduled to appear in a June state court hearing that might lead to sanctions against him for frivolous litigation "to obscure the whereabouts of $2 million investors placed into escrow". Seddio is widely seen as a power broker who influences the selection of judges, and his influence and connections have led to multiple judges recusing themselves from overseeing a case concerning him.

== In popular culture ==
In 2014, Seddio had a cameo in the political television show The Good Wife.

In 2020, Seddio's Christmas house was featured on the reality television show The Great Christmas Light Fight.

== Personal life ==
He lives and works in southeastern Brooklyn, where he makes annual headlines for an elaborate Christmas light display which is known to attract a large number of spectators, among them high-ranking elected officials such as former New York City Mayor Bill de Blasio.
