= Breukelen Houses =

Public housing development in Brooklyn, New York

- NYCHA property
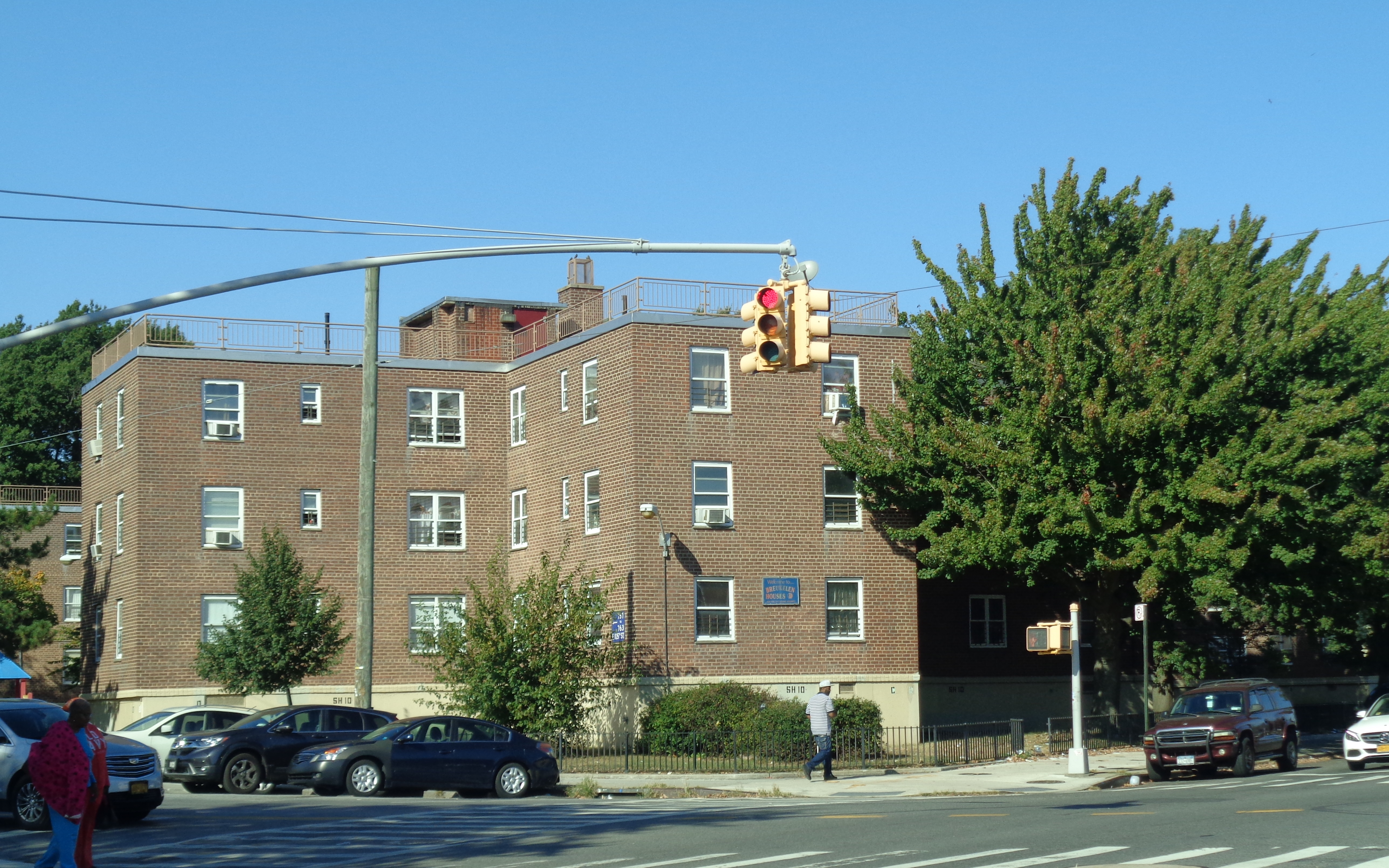
- NYCHA Breukelen Houses in 2017
- Interactive map of Breukelen Houses
- Coordinates: 40.651°N 73.894°W
- Country: United States
- State: New York
- City: New York City
- Borough: Brooklyn

Area
  - Total: 0.101 sq mi (0.26 km^{2})

Population
  - Total: 3,605
  - Density: 35,700/sq mi (13,800/km^{2})
- ZIP codes: 11236
- Area codes: 718, 347, 929, and 917
- Website: my.nycha.info/DevPortal/

Breukelen Houses (/ˈbrʊklaɪn/ BRUUK-lyne), also known as Breukelen and referred to by locals as "Brookline", is a large housing complex maintained in the Canarsie neighborhood of Brooklyn, by the New York City Housing Authority (NYCHA). The housing complex is bounded by East 103rd and East 105th Streets to the west, Flatlands Avenue to the south, Stanley Avenue to the north, and Williams Avenue to the east. The complex sits on 64.98 acres (26.30 ha) and consists of 1,595 apartment units inside 30 structures, all of which are either three or seven stories high. As of March 2008, the population was estimated to be 4,038. Its main office is located at 618 East 108th Street, Brooklyn, NY 11236.

== History ==
The Breukelen Houses gets its name from the Dutch in 1683, when present-day Brooklyn was known as Breukelen (named after the Dutch town of Breukelen). It later changed to Brockland, Brocklin, Brookline, and finally Brooklyn. The housing project borders the community of Flatlands to the southeast.

In the aftermath of World War II, there was a shortage of housing in Canarsie. Planning for the Breukelen development started in 1949. In August 1951, work started and was completed on October 31, 1952.

In 1980, the development received $21.6 million from the Department of Housing and Urban Development to modernize its heating systems, external improvements, and apartments. In 2001 the NYCHA authorized $4.5 million in upgrades to Breukelen Houses. Residents enjoyed new fencing, walkways, shrubbery, playgrounds, and updated lighting. In February 2007 the Breukelen Community Center opened its doors to the homeless as one of nine winter emergency “warming spots” in the city.

== Capital needs ==
Officials of the NYCHA claim their woes are due to “chronic federal under-funding”. As a result, in recent years many residents within the Breukelen community have expressed fears of mass privatization and pending rent hikes. As of June 2007 the NYCHA held a deficit of over $200 million with little to no fiscal help from Albany (state capital) or Washington in sight. Additionally, the NYCHA has lost $999 million between 2001 and 2008. In spite of it financial insufficiency, the NYCHA is not going to privatize housing. Instead they're selling surplus NYCHA land to the city's housing agency to develop affordable housing. They’ve also made staff and expense cuts and have more impending employee cutbacks in the works.

Nevertheless, Julia Vitullo-Martin purports that a potential buyer offered up $1.3 billion for an area of public housing in East New York that might encompass some or all of Breukelen Houses. Furthermore, Mayor Bloomberg stated on a radio show in 2007 that public housing has to pay for itself. With the NYCHA’s perpetual debt and with pressures from private, city, state, and federal departments, privatization may in fact be in Breukelen’s future.

In 2014, the Breukelen Houses topped the list of Brooklyn properties, and third-highest in the city in need of repair due to NYCHA's capital needs. The property had 897 non-current work orders, 44 outstanding Department of Buildings violations, and six outstanding Environmental Control Board violations.

== See also ==
- New York City Housing Authority
- List of New York City Housing Authority properties
