= Roxanne Persaud =

American politician

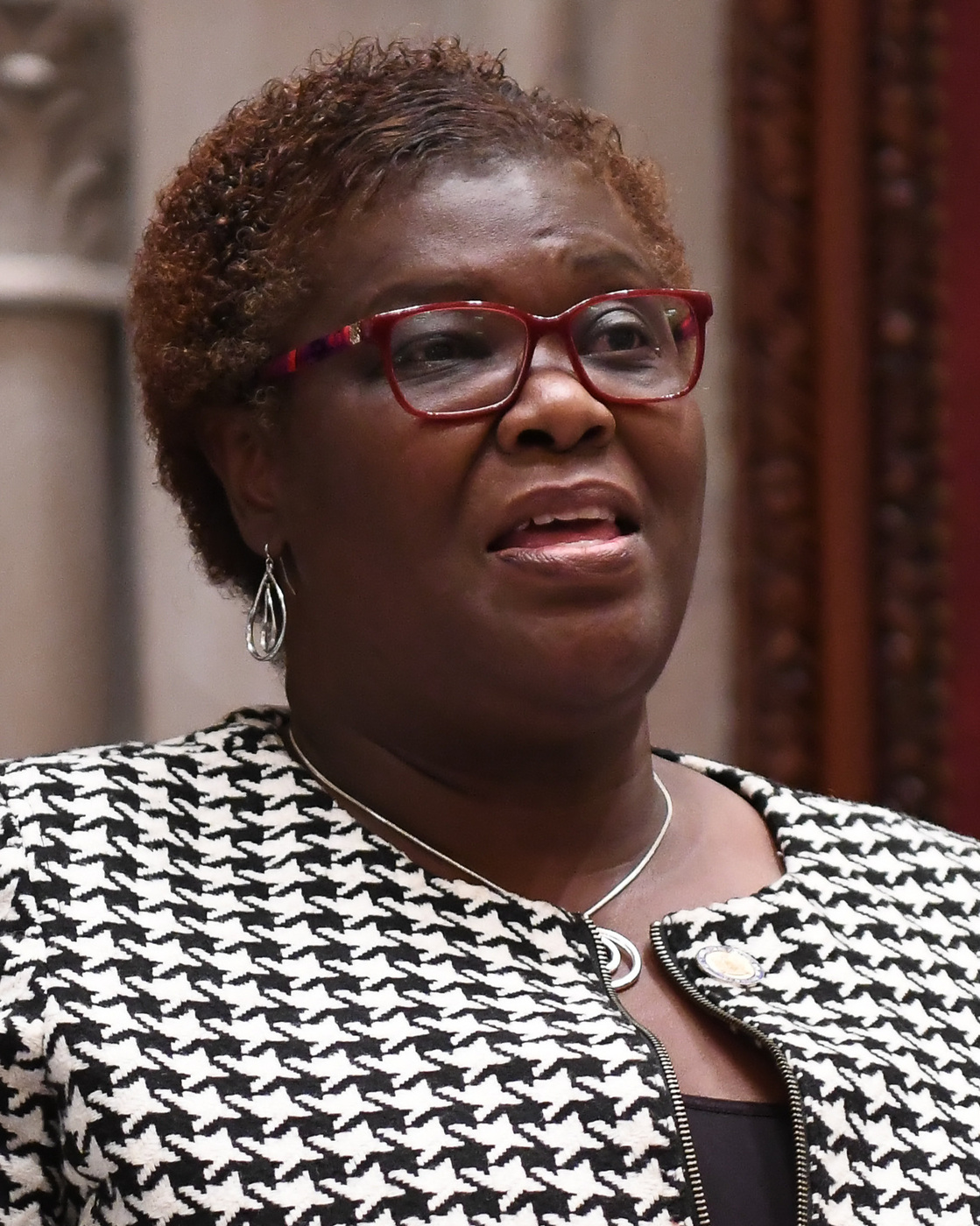

Member of the New York State Senate from the 19th district
- Incumbent
- Assumed office November 4, 2015
- Preceded by: John Sampson

Member of the New York Assembly from the 59th district
- In office January 1, 2015 – November 4, 2015
- Preceded by: Alan Maisel
- Succeeded by: Jaime Williams

Personal details
- Born: March 1, 1966 (age 60) St. Cuthbert's Mission, British Guiana (now Guyana)
- Party: Democratic
- Education: Pace University (BS, MS)
- Website: Campaign website State Senate website

Roxanne Persaud (born March 1, 1966) is a Guyanese-American politician. She is a Democrat and a member of the New York Senate for the 19th district, which includes portions of Canarsie, East New York, Brownsville, Mill Basin, Sheepshead Bay, Bergen Beach, Marine Park, Flatlands, Ocean Hill and Starrett City in Brooklyn.

== Life and career ==
A native of Guyana, Persaud immigrated with her family to Brooklyn, New York as a young person. She is of Dougla (Indo-Guyanese and Afro-Guyanese) heritage. She graduated from Pace University with both a Bachelor of Science and Master of Science in Education Administration before entering a career in education.

Persaud previously served as a school administrator with Pace University and St. Francis College, Brooklyn, and also was involved with her community board in Canarsie, and has served on numerous boards and commissions for the community. In 2015, Persaud won the Democratic nomination to succeed Alan Maisel in the New York Assembly, and served from January to November 2015.

== New York Senate ==
In 2015, Senator John Sampson was found guilty of corruption and forced to resign. Persaud, then a first-term Assemblywoman, was chosen by the Kings County Democratic Party to succeed him, and easily won election that November to finish his term. In 2016, Persaud faced a primary challenge from Mercedes Narcisse, who was backed by Assemblyman Charles Barron and Councilwoman Inez Barron. Persaud easily defeated Narcisse with over 75% of the vote. Persaud easily won re-election in 2016, 2018, and 2020.

Persaud was sworn in as state Senator on November 4, 2015. In 2019, with Democrats gaining the majority in the Senate, Persaud was named Chair of the Social Services Committee.
