= Herbert Berman =

American politician (1933–2014)

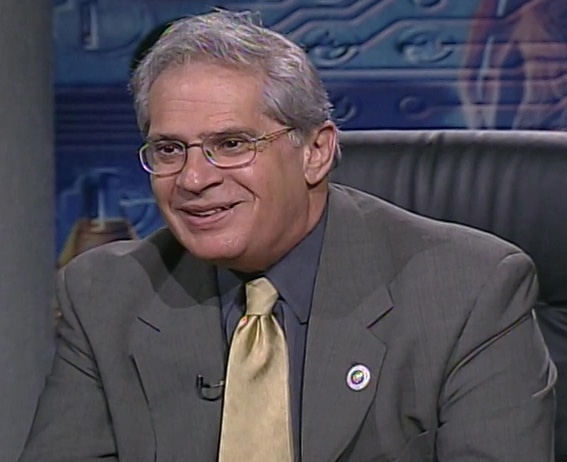
Berman on CUNY TV's Education Forum, October 2000.

Herbert Berman (August 19, 1933 – July 6, 2014) was a politician in New York City. He served as a City Councilman from Brooklyn and was the chairman of the Council Finance Committee for several years. Because of term limits prohibiting Berman from seeking reelection in 2001 to the Council, he sought the Democratic nomination for New York City Comptroller. He lost the Democratic nomination to former Board of Education President William C. Thompson, Jr. and was the nominee of the Liberal Party in the general election, which was also won by Thompson.

Berman then briefly served as Governor George Pataki's liaison to the Jewish community and was then appointed by Gov. George Pataki as president of the Roosevelt Island Operating Corporation, which runs the affairs of Roosevelt Island. Berman served in this position from 2003 to 2007. He died on July 6, 2014, from a long illness at the age of 80.

Political offices
Preceded by Monroe Cohen	New York City Council, 23rd district 1975–1991	Succeeded by Sheldon S. Leffler
Preceded by Newly created district	New York City Council, 46th district 1992–2001	Succeeded by Lewis Fidler
