= New York's 19th State Senate district =

American legislative district

Senator
Roxanne Persaud; D–Canarsie
- Registration: 75.2% Democratic; 7.0% Republican; 15.1% No party preference
- Demographics: 16% White; 60% Black; 15% Hispanic; 8% Asian
- Population (2017): 338,328
- Registered voters: 205,360

New York's 19th State Senate district is one of 63 districts in the New York State Senate. It has been represented by Democrat Roxanne Persaud since her 2015 victory in a special election to replace indicted incumbent John Sampson.

== Geography ==
=== 2020s ===
District 19 covers southeastern Brooklyn and a portion of southwestern Queens, including most of the Brooklyn neighborhoods of Canarsie, East New York and Starrett City, portions of Bergen Beach, Brownsville, Remsen Village, and Cypress Hills, and the Queens neighborhood of Lindenwood.

The district overlaps with New York's 5th, 7th, 8th, and 9th congressional districts, the 23rd, 54th, 55th, 58th, 59th and 60th districts of the New York State Assembly, and the 32nd, 37th, 41st, 42nd and 46th districts of the New York City Council.

=== 2010s ===
District 19 is located in southeastern Brooklyn, including some or all of the neighborhoods of Canarsie, East New York, Brownsville, Mill Basin, Sheepshead Bay, Bergen Beach, Marine Park, Flatlands, and Ocean Hill.

The district overlaps with New York's 7th, 8th, 9th, and 11th congressional districts, and with the 41st, 42nd, 45th, 54th, 55th, 58th, 59th, and 60th districts of the New York State Assembly.

== Recent election results ==
=== 2026 ===
2026 New York State Senate election, District 19
Party	Candidate	Votes	%
Democratic	Roxanne Persaud (incumbent)		
Write-in			
Total votes			100.0

=== 2024 ===
2024 New York State Senate election, District 19
Party	Candidate	Votes	%
Democratic	Roxanne Persaud (incumbent)	74,011	99.6
Write-in		313	0.4
Total votes		74,324	100.0
Democratic hold			

=== 2022 ===
2022 New York State Senate election, District 19
Party	Candidate	Votes	%
Democratic	Roxanne Persaud (incumbent)	43,866	99.7
Write-in		131	0.3
Total votes		43,997	100.0
Democratic hold			

=== 2020 ===
2020 New York State Senate election, District 19
Primary election
Party	Candidate	Votes	%
Democratic	Roxanne Persaud (incumbent)	19,971	74.8
Democratic	Keron Alleyne	6,642	24.9
Write-in		85	0.3
Total votes		26,698	100.0
General election
Democratic	Roxanne Persaud (incumbent)	95,755	99.4
Write-in		577	0.6
Total votes		96,332	100.0
Democratic hold			

=== 2018 ===
2018 New York State Senate election, District 19
Party	Candidate	Votes	%
Democratic	Roxanne Persaud	68,041	
Working Families	Roxanne Persaud	1,279	
Total	Roxanne Persaud (incumbent)	69,320	89.8
Republican	Jeffrey Ferretti	7,117	
Conservative	Jeffrey Ferretti	703	
Total	Jeffrey Ferretti	7,820	10.1
Write-in		56	0.1
Total votes		77,196	100.0
Democratic hold			

=== 2016 ===
2016 New York State Senate election, District 19
Primary election
Party	Candidate	Votes	%
Democratic	Roxanne Persaud (incumbent)	10,358	75.8
Democratic	Mercedes Narcisse	3,284	24.0
Write-in		32	0.2
Total votes		13,674	100.0
General election
Democratic	Roxanne Persaud	86,433	
Working Families	Roxanne Persaud	3,786	
Total	Roxanne Persaud (incumbent)	90,219	99.8
Write-in		193	0.2
Total votes		90,412	100.0
Democratic hold			

=== 2015 special ===
2015 New York State Senate special election, District 19
Party	Candidate	Votes	%
Democratic	Roxanne Persaud	7,380	
Women's Equality	Roxanne Persaud	94	
Independence	Roxanne Persaud	72	
Total	Roxanne Persaud	7,546	87.6
Republican	Jeffrey Ferretti	779	9.0
Conservative	Elias Weir	278	3.2
Write-in		16	0.2
Total votes		8,619	100.0
Democratic hold			

=== 2014 ===
2014 New York State Senate election, District 19
Primary election
Party	Candidate	Votes	%
Democratic	John Sampson (incumbent)	7,572	54.2
Democratic	Dell Smitherman	4,123	29.5
Democratic	Sean Henry	1,732	12.4
Democratic	Elias Weir	504	3.6
Write-in		37	0.3
Total votes		13,968	100.0
General election
Democratic	John Sampson (incumbent)	29,741	86.0
Conservative	Elias Weir	2,816	8.1
Working Families	Dell Smitherman	1,993	5.8
Write-in		28	0.1
Total votes		34,578	100.0
Democratic hold			

=== 2012 ===
2012 New York State Senate election, District 19
Party	Candidate	Votes	%
Democratic	John Sampson	77,618	
Working Families	John Sampson	1,356	
Total	John Sampson (incumbent)	78,974	90.3
Republican	Jane Neal	7,226	8.3
Conservative	Elias Weir	1,196	1.4
Write-in		23	0.0
Total votes		87,419	100.0
Democratic hold			

=== Federal results in District 19 ===
Year	Office	Results
2020	President	Biden 83.2 – 16.0%
2016	President	Clinton 85.3 – 13.3%
2012	President	Obama 88.7 – 11.0%
2012	Senate	Gillibrand 91.5 – 8.0%
