= Lewis A. Fidler =

American lawyer and politician (1956–2019)

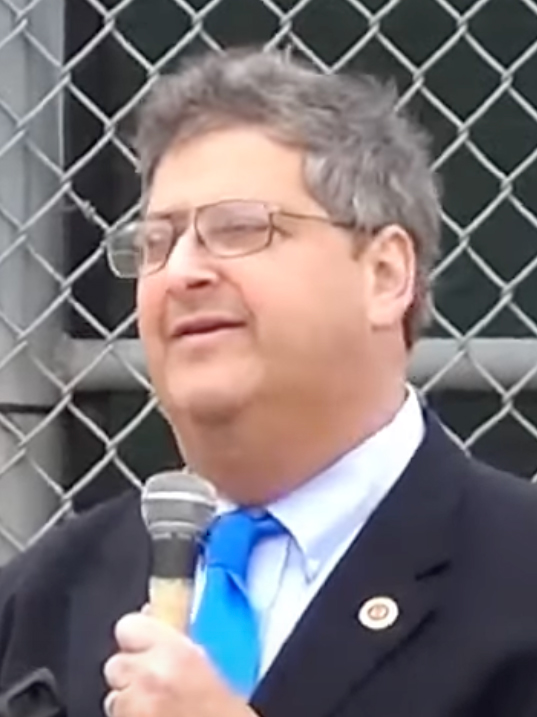
- Fidler in 2012

Member of the New York City Council from the 46th district
- In office January 1, 2002 – December 31, 2013
- Preceded by: Herbert Berman
- Succeeded by: Alan Maisel
- Constituency: Brooklyn: Bergen Beach, Canarsie, Georgetown, Starrett City, Flatlands, Marine Park, Mill Basin, Mill Island, Gerritsen Beach, Madison, Sheepshead Bay.

Personal details
- Born: May 27, 1956
- Died: May 5, 2019 (aged 62) Queens, New York City, U.S.
- Party: Democratic
- Spouse: Robin
- Children: 2
- Education: SUNY Albany (B.A. 1975); NYU School of Law (J.D. 1978)
- Profession: Politician, Lawyer
- Website: Lawcash.net

Lewis A. "Lew" Fidler (May 27, 1956 – May 5, 2019) was an American politician and New York City Councilman. In January 2002, he began his first term representing the 46th district in New York City, which includes the Brooklyn neighborhoods of Bergen Beach, Canarsie, Georgetown, Flatlands, Marine Park, Mill Basin, Mill Island, Gerritsen Beach, Madison and Sheepshead Bay.

== Career ==
=== City Council ===
During his time in the City Council, Fidler chaired of the Youth Services committee. He has also served as assistant majority leader under Speaker Christine Quinn. Fidler also served on the Education, Finance, Housing & Buildings, State & Federal Legislation, Veterans and Rules, Privileges & Elections committees. He was Democratic State Committeeman since 1992. In 2009, Fidler faced only token opposition from a Republican candidate whom he defeated with 79.2 percent of the vote. Fidler did not run for re-election in 2013 due to term limits; he was succeeded by fellow Democrat Alan Maisel on January 1, 2014.

=== Elections ===
In 1992 he was campaign manager for councilman Sal Albanese in a failed attempt to unseat congresswoman Susan Molinari in a year Democrats retook the White House. Additionally, Fidler served as campaign manager for the successful campaign of Brooklyn District Attorney Charles J. Hynes.

=== 2012 State Senate special election ===
Fidler was the Democratic nominee for the New York State Senate special election being held on March 20, 2012. The district encompasses parts of Mill Basin, Bergen Beach, Sheepshead Bay, Manhattan Beach, Brighton Beach, Bensonhurst, and Midwood. He faced Republican lawyer David Storobin. The vote was exceedingly close and a final tally was still not finished or released by Friday, April 20, 2012. On May 31, 2012, Lew Fidler conceded to Storobin following a full re-count, which Storobin led by 14 votes.

== Personal life and death ==
Fidler attended PS 208, JHS 285 and Tilden High School. He received a B.A. from SUNY Albany in 1975, and a J.D. from NYU School of Law in 1978. He was admitted to the New York State Bar Association in 1979.

From 1983 to 2019, Fidler was a partner in the firm of Roberts and Fidler PC. He lived in his district with his wife, Robin and their two sons.

At 11 p.m. on May 4, 2019, Fidler was found unconscious at a theater in Queens, and was brought to Elmhurst Hospital Center. He died the following day after undergoing two surgeries, without ever regaining consciousness.

On November 9, 2021, Fidler was memorialized with the opening of Lew Fidler Park in Sheepshead Bay.

Political offices
Preceded by Herbert Berman	New York City Council, 46th district 2002–2013	Succeeded by Alan Maisel
