= John L. Sampson =

American politician (born 1965)

John Sampson

Member of the New York State Senate from the 19th district
- In office January 1997 – July 24, 2015
- Preceded by: Howard E. Babbush
- Succeeded by: Roxanne Persaud

Democratic Conference Leader New York State Senate
- In office June 15, 2009 – December 17, 2012
- Preceded by: Office created
- Succeeded by: Andrea Stewart-Cousins

Personal details
- Born: Brooklyn, New York, U.S.
- Party: Democratic
- Education: Brooklyn College (B.A.); Albany Law School (J.D.)

John Llewllyn Sampson is an American former politician. A member of the Democratic Party, Sampson represented District 19 in the New York State Senate from 1997 to 2015. He is of Guyanese heritage. Sampson became Senate Democratic Leader in June 2009 and served as Senate Minority Leader from January 2011 to December 2012. Sampson was expelled from the Senate after being convicted of federal felony charges on July 24, 2015. On January 18, 2017, he was sentenced to five years in prison. He was released in 2021.

== Education and early legal career ==
Sampson earned his B.A. in Political Science from Brooklyn College and a J.D. from Albany Law School (class of 1991). He was a member of the Board of Trustees of Albany Law School.

Sampson worked for the Department of Environmental Conservation and as a Staff Attorney to the Legal Aid Society of New York.

Starting in 1994, he worked as an attorney for the law firm of Alter and Barbaro, Esqs.

== Political career ==
Elected in 1996 to the New York State Senate, Sampson served as a state Senator from 1997 to July 2015. He served as chairman of the Senate Ethics Committee and the Senate Administrative Regulations Review Commission, and was the first African-American to serve as chairman of the Senate Judiciary Committee. Sampson represented Senate District 19 in Brooklyn.

In 2005, Sampson made an unsuccessful bid to become District Attorney of Kings County, New York, opposing the incumbent, Charles J. Hynes.

On June 15, 2009, Sampson was elevated to the leadership of the Democratic Conference of the State Senate. As Conference chairman, he was responsible for the day-to-day operations and the legislative agenda of the Democratic caucus.

In early January 2011, just before the 2011 legislative session convened, four Senate Democrats—led by former Democratic whip Jeff Klein—broke away from the Senate Democratic Conference to form the Republican—aligned Independent Democratic Conference (IDC). Klein said that he and his three colleagues—Diane Savino, David Carlucci and David Valesky—could no longer support Sampson's leadership.

On December 17, 2012, Sampson was ousted from his leadership post when Democrats elected Andrea Stewart-Cousins as Senate Democratic Leader.

=== Criminal charges and conviction ===
On May 6, 2013, Sampson was indicted by a federal grand jury for embezzlement, obstruction of justice, and making false statements to the Federal Bureau of Investigation. The indictment stemmed from Sampson's alleged theft of $400,000 from the sale of foreclosed homes. He pleaded not guilty. On the day of his indictment, Sampson was stripped of his committee assignments and ranking positions and removed from the Senate Democratic Conference. Despite the indictment, Sampson won re-election in 2014.

On July 24, 2015, Sampson was convicted of one count of obstruction of justice and two counts of making false statements to federal agents, which are felonies. Upon his conviction, he was automatically expelled from the Senate. On March 10, 2016, the Appellate Division of the New York Supreme Court suspended Sampson from the practice of law.

Sampson filed an appeal based on a 2016 United States Supreme Court decision that overturned the conviction of former Virginia Governor Bob McDonnell. On January 18, 2017, Sampson was sentenced to five years in prison. He was released on parole in August 2021.

== See also ==
- Paterson, David "Black, Blind, & In Charge: A Story of Visionary Leadership and Overcoming Adversity."Skyhorse Publishing. New York, New York, 2020

New York State Senate
Preceded by Howard E. Babbush	New York State Senate; 19th district 1997–2015	Succeeded by Roxanne Persaud
Preceded by John A. DeFrancisco	New York State Senate; Chairman of the Judiciary Committee; 2009–2010	Succeeded by John Bonacic
Preceded by Andrew Lanza	New York State Senate; Chairman of the Committee on Ethics; 2009–2010	Succeeded by Andrew Lanza
Party political offices
New office	Democratic Conference Leader in the New York State Senate; 2009–2010	Succeeded by José M. Serrano
Preceded by Dean Skelos	Minority Leader in the New York State Senate; 2011–2013	Succeeded by Andrea Stewart-Cousins
