= Canarsie, Brooklyn =

Neighborhood in New York City

Canarsie
- Neighborhood of Brooklyn
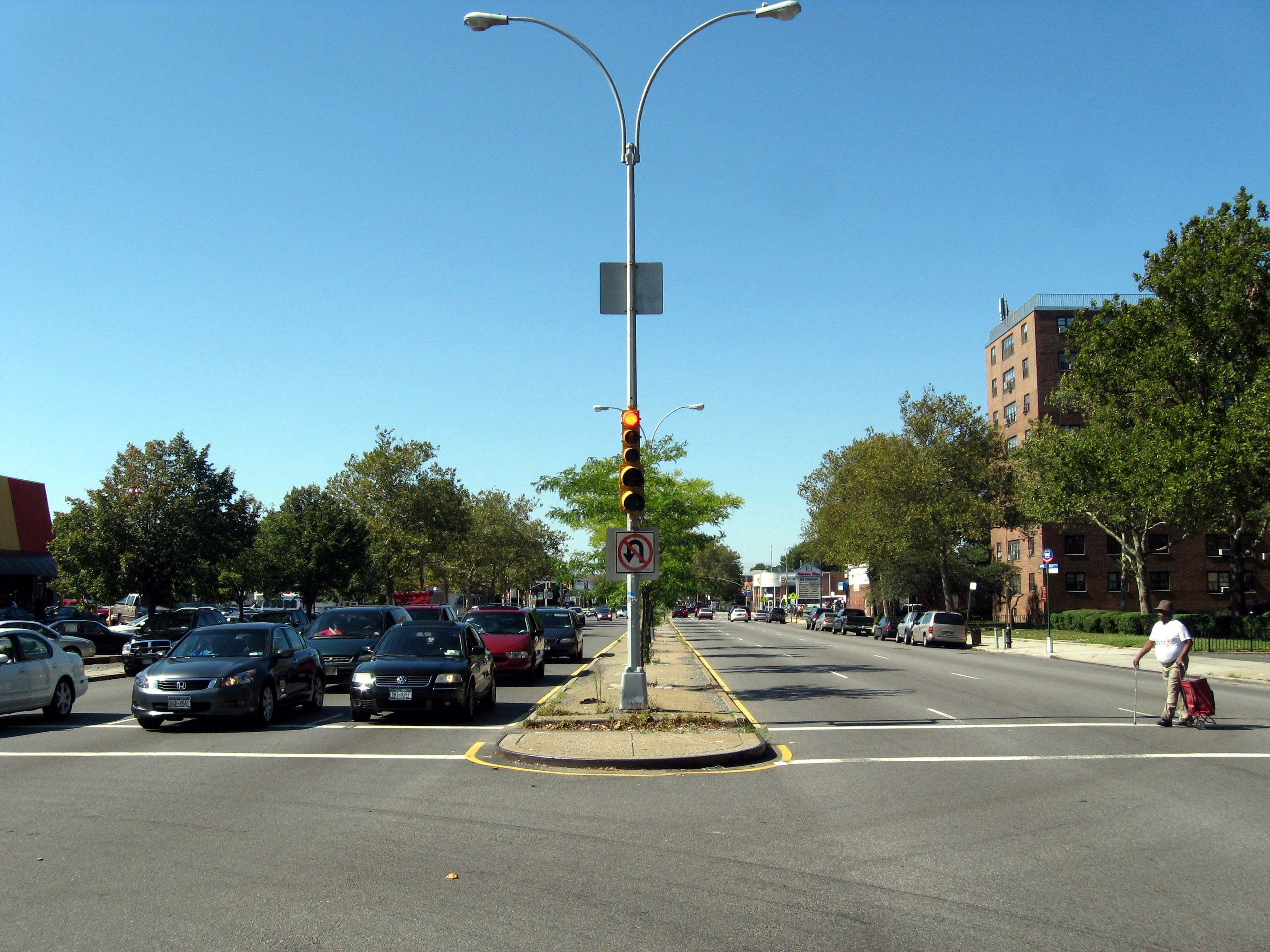
- Rockaway Parkway in Canarsie
- Nickname: The Flossy
- Interactive map of Canarsie
- Coordinates: 40.640°N 73.902°W
- Country: United States
- State: New York
- City: New York City
- Borough: Brooklyn
- Community District: Brooklyn 18

Area
  - Total: 2.898 sq mi (7.51 km^{2})

Population (2020)
  - Total: 88,522
  - Density: 30,550/sq mi (11,790/km^{2})

Economics
  - Median per capita income: $71,393
- ZIP Code: 11236
- Area code: 718, 347, 929, and 917

Canarsie (/kəˈnɑːrsi/ kə-NAR-see) is a mostly residential neighborhood in the southeastern portion of Brooklyn, New York City. Canarsie is bordered on the east by Fresh Creek Basin, East 108th Street, and Louisiana Avenue, on the north by Linden Boulevard, on the west by Ralph Avenue, on the southwest by Paerdegat Basin, and on the south by Jamaica Bay. It is adjacent to the neighborhoods of East Flatbush to the west, Flatlands and Bergen Beach to the southwest, Starrett City to the east, East New York to the northeast, and Brownsville to the north.

The area near Canarsie was originally settled by the Canarse Native Americans. The community's name is adapted from a Lenape word meaning "fenced area". After European settlement, Canarsie was initially a fishing community, but became a popular summer resort in the late 19th and early 20th centuries. By the late 1930s and early 1940, the resorts had been destroyed, and Canarsie was developed as a largely Italian American and Jewish suburb. In the 1970s, racial tensions developed around an argument over the zoning of the area's schools, and in the aftermath, Canarsie became a mainly black neighborhood with a high West Indian population in the late 1990s.

Canarsie is part of Brooklyn Community District 18 and its primary ZIP Code is 11236. It is patrolled by the 69th Precinct of the New York City Police Department. Fire services are provided by the New York City Fire Department's Engine Co. 257/Ladder Co. 170/Battalion 58. Politically it is represented by the New York City Council's 42nd and 46th Districts.

== Etymology ==
"Canarsie" is an adaptation to English phonology of a word in the Lenape language for 'fenced land' or 'fort'. Europeans would often refer to the indigenous people living in an area by the local place-name, though it is unclear whether the "Canarsie" name originally referred to their entire ancestral land, or whether it merely referred to a single "fenced village". References may be found in contemporary documents to "Canarsie Indians" (alternatively "Canarsee"). Their name has also been transcribed as "Connarie See" (a name for Jamaica Bay), "Conorasset", "Canarisse", "Canaryssen", "Canause", "Canarisea", and "Kanarsingh". The village itself was referred to as "Keskachauge" or "Kestateuw", alternatively transcribed as "Castateuw". After European settlement, the area became variously known as "Flatlands Neck", "Vischers Hook", and "Great Neck".

"By way of Canarsie" became a mid-twentieth century American English figure of speech meaning "to come to one's destination by a roundabout way or from a distant point". The expression has dropped from modern common parlance.

Canarsie was described as "the butt of vaudeville jokes" in the 1939 WPA Guide to New York City. A New York Times article in 1955 characterized Canarsie as a former "lame vaudeville gag". By the 2010s, "The Flossy" was also being used as a local nickname for Canarsie.

== Geography ==
Canarsie is bordered on the east by Fresh Creek Basin and Williams Avenue; on the north by Linden Boulevard and the Bay Ridge Branch; on the west by Ralph Avenue; on the southwest by Paerdegat Basin; and on the southeast by Belt Parkway and Jamaica Bay. It is adjacent to the neighborhoods of East Flatbush on the northwest, Flatlands on the west, Bergen Beach on the southwest, Brownsville on the north, and the Spring Creek subsection of East New York on the east and northeast.

Prior to European settlement, Canarsie featured the only large swath of uplands along the Jamaica Bay coast within the town of Flatlands. The islands in the bay, such as Bergen, Mill, and Barren islands, mostly featured marshy land with small pieces of uplands. In the 19th century, a few ports along the coast were built for limited industrial use. The coast was more significantly modified in the early 20th century, when more than 1 mile (1.6 km) of shoreline was filled in with a bulkhead.

== History ==
=== Early history ===
The coastal lands around Jamaica Bay, including present-day Canarsie, were originally settled by the Canarsie Indians. The present-day neighborhood of Canarsie was one of the Canarsie tribe's main villages. They probably lived near the intersection of present-day Seaview and Remsen Avenues. Cornfields grew from the shore to as far inland as Avenue J, and were centered around East 92nd Street. The Canarsie Indians grew cornfields on three flats within the area. As late as the 1930s, "immense shell heaps" could be found at the site. These shells might have served as planting fields.

In 1624, the Dutch Republic incorporated much of the current New York City area into the colony of New Netherland. In 1636, as the Dutch was expanding outward from present-day Manhattan, Dutch settlers founded the town of Achtervelt (later Amersfoort, then Flatlands) and purchased 15,000 acres (6,100 ha) around Jamaica Bay. Amersfoort was centered around the present-day intersection of Flatbush Avenue and Flatlands Avenue. Canarsie Indian leaders such as Penhawitz had signed three land agreements with Dutch settlers between 1636 and 1667, handing ownership of much of their historic land to the Dutch. Many of the tribe's members started moving away, and Dutch settlers rented the cornfields that had formerly belonged to the Indians. Much of the remaining land was located in the present-day neighborhood of Canarsie. The first European settler in the area was Pieter Claesen Wyckoff, a former indentured servant who built a house in Flatlands circa 1652. Wyckoff's house still stands along Clarendon Road, and it is believed to be the oldest structure in New York State.

In 1660, present-day Canarsie Point was given the name Vischers Hook ("fishers' hook"). The name referred to Hoorn, a Dutch fisherman who had built a house at that location. At the time, a group of islands extended into Jamaica Bay south of Canarsie, up to and including Barren Island.

The Indians still managed the land at Canarsie until the English took over New Amsterdam. In 1665, Canarsie Indians signed a land agreement that gave total ownership of almost all their land to the Dutch. By the time the land agreement was signed, only three Native American families remained in the area. In 1670, Daniel Denton, a co-founder of the nearby town of Jamaica, wrote: "It is to be admired how strangely they have decreast by the Hand of God [...] for since my time, when there were six towns, they are reduced to two small villages." Through 1684, the Dutch and the Native Americans had signed twenty-two deeds regarding the sale of different plots of land in Flatlands. By the beginning of the 18th century, the only Canarsie Indians living in the New York City area were a few small groups in the town of Canarsie, as well as at Gerritsen Beach and Staten Island. At this time, their ancestral land in Canarsie had been fragmented and sold off to different settlers. Some plots were subsequently merged to create large plantation-style farms. An observer noted in 1832 that "the Canarsie Indians are at this time totally extinct; not a single member of that ill-fated race is in existence". However, a few members still remained, albeit via mixed lineage. Joel Skidmore, the last member of the tribe through his mother's side, was a tax collector from the town of Flatlands who lived in Canarsie until he died in 1907.

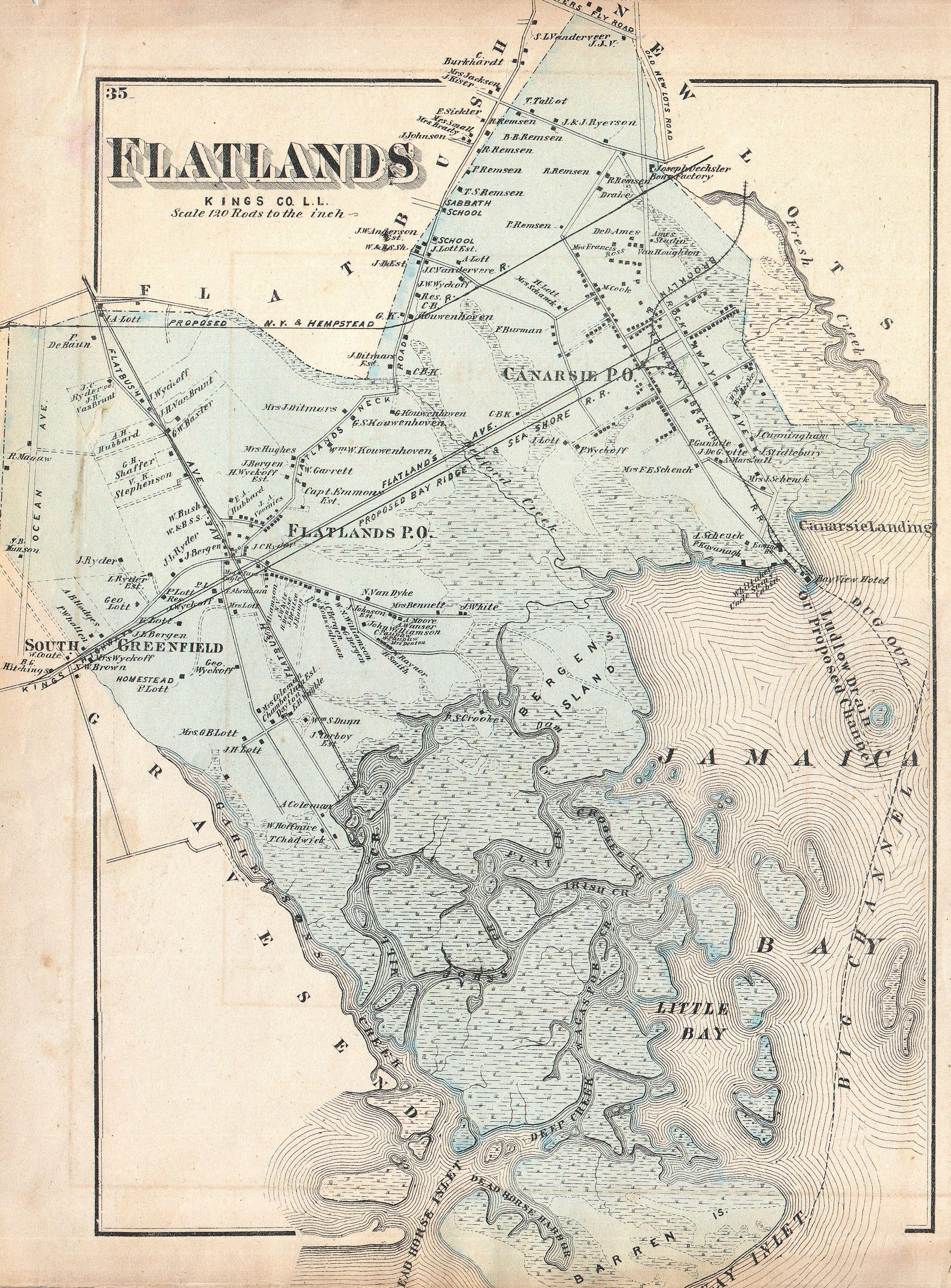
Map of Flatlands in 1873, which included Canarsie (at top right) but excluded the Fresh Creek shore

The towns of Flatbush and Flatlands laid competing claims to the western shore of Fresh Creek, within present-day Canarsie. A 1685 confirmation of Flatlands' boundaries did not recognize this small patch of land; instead, this land was classified as part of New Lots, then a subdivision of Flatbush. This dispute continued into the 19th century, as seen by maps from 1797 and 1873. Through this time, Canarsie remained sparsely populated. In an 1852 map, Jeremiah Schenck and James Schenck were listed as the only two landowners at Canarsie Point. They each owned 50 acres (20 ha) of land. The only road in the area was what would later be Rockaway Parkway. The only way to Canarsie was by taking a train to Jamaica and transferring to a stagecoach, where passengers would endure a "long and uncomfortable ride" through the marshy woodlands that the road winded through.

=== Seaside resort ===
The Brooklyn and Rockaway Beach Railroad, which opened on October 21, 1865, offered train service from the Long Island Rail Road at the East New York station to a pier at Canarsie Landing, very close to the current junction of Rockaway Parkway and the Belt Parkway. The railroad built a pier extending into Jamaica Bay, which was used for lumber deliveries and was later enlarged. Less than a year later, in summer 1866, the railroad started operating a ferry to Rockaway Beach, marking the start of the area's transformation into a summer beach resort. That year, there were ten daily round trips along the Canarsie railroad, but only three on the Rockaway ferry, so vacationers traveling to the Rockaways via the railroad and ferry would often stay on Canarsie Landing for a few hours. Railroad service was increased in 1867, with trains running every hour on weekdays and every half hour on Sundays; the railroad handled 122,567 passengers that year.

Five hotels soon opened on the Canarsie shore, starting with Bay View House in July 1867. In addition, restaurants and saloons began operating along Canarsie Landing. An 1867 account from a Brooklyn Daily Eagle correspondent stated that there were two railroads: the Canarsie steam dummy, which ran only to East New York, and the Nostrand Avenue Line, which connected with other streetcar lines that ran across Brooklyn. The correspondent wrote that "it has ample hotel accommodations for boarders or casual visitors, and all it needs is a good roadway along the waterside for promenade and drive." The next year, an article from the Eagle noted that although Canarsie still had a reputation for being a fisherman's village, it "will be largely patronized as soon as people get the means of going there". German, Dutch, Scottish, and Irish settlers started moving to Canarsie in large numbers during the 1870s.

Ferry service remained infrequent because any increase to ferry service would require new vessels, and in order to do that, Jamaica Bay would need to be dredged at a very high cost. At the time, the bay was a few inches deep during low tide, and a narrow, 5.5-to-7-foot-deep (1.7 to 2.1 m) channel stretched across the bay. The Canarsie Line employed steamboats, which were able to make a round trip in two hours and navigate the bay at low tide. During its early history, the route used steamers with a capacity of 250 passengers; later boats had larger capacity. In 1878, there were two proposals to create a more frequent transportation service between Canarsie and the Rockaways, but neither was implemented. One proposal entailed extending a railroad trestle into Jamaica Bay to shorten the ferry trip, while the other involved constructing a narrow-gauge railway that ran to Broad Channel, Queens. By that year, a rectangular peninsula extended into the bay. In 1880, the New York, Woodhaven and Rockaway Railroad constructed a trestle across the bay and started operating service across it. White's Iron Steamboats, which sailed from Manhattan directly to the Rockaways, started operating two years later. Despite the existence of two competitors, the Canarsie railroad saw a healthy continued patronage because many passengers wanted to go to Canarsie itself.

The success of the Canarsie railroad and the variety of activities available at Canarsie Point both contributed to that area's prosperity. In the late 1860s, a boat-rental company opened in Canarsie, and by 1880, there were ten such companies, with each company owning 50 boats on average. Rentals ranged from $5 to $7 on weekdays, and from $7 to $10 on weekends. An 1882 newspaper article observed that after traveling to Canarsie "through a tract of country that looked like one vast lawn of green velvet", visitors could hire yachts or rowboats, or just breathe the fresh air. In 1883, a large double-decker barge for theatrical and musical performances, called the "Floating Pavilion", was permanently anchored 0.75 miles (1.21 km) off the Canarsie shore. The depth of the bay was only 4 feet (1.2 m) deep at this point, making it suitable for bathing. A 50-foot (15 m) stage extended into the water for the performers, while bathhouses were placed on the barge's lower tier. The steamer Edith Peck regularly traveled between the shore and the barge. Summer bungalows were also built along the bay shore, especially east of Canarsie Landing in an area called Sand Bay. Since the land was submerged during low tide, many of these houses were built on stilts. Electric lighting was installed in 1892 in a bid to attract visitors at night as well.

Canarsie also grew into a fishing hub by the late 19th century. In 1850, there were 75 fishermen in Flatlands, compared to 191 other individuals who worked in agriculture. By 1880, there were 200 fishermen in Flatlands, of which around 90% lived in Canarsie. In an 1865 account, The New York Times described the fishing village as a self-sufficient community that was "a place of much resort for fishing, and one of the best near to the city". Boatbuilding also became popular: the number of boatbuilders in Canarsie grew from one in 1868 to eight in 1887. Much of the boats built in Canarsie were small rowboats, but some of them were large sloops. A 1900 magazine article described the Canarsie bay shore as "a level expanse of marshy meadowland indented with shallow inlets and dotted with boathouses, fishing huts, and boat builders' cabins perched high and dry on wooden piles." Visitors could rent a rowboat and catch fish at Ruffle Bar or other locations within Jamaica Bay. If these visitors had enough money, they could rent a large sloop and head to the open ocean to fish.

=== Fishing and amusement heyday ===
By the start of the 20th century, Canarsie was a bustling amusement district. Of the 50 buildings along the Canarsie bay shore, eighteen were hotels. Three ferry systems operated routes to Bergen Island, Barren Island, Rockaway Beach, and other destinations in Jamaica Bay. A fourth would start operations in 1915, but shuttered in 1918 after several unprofitable seasons.

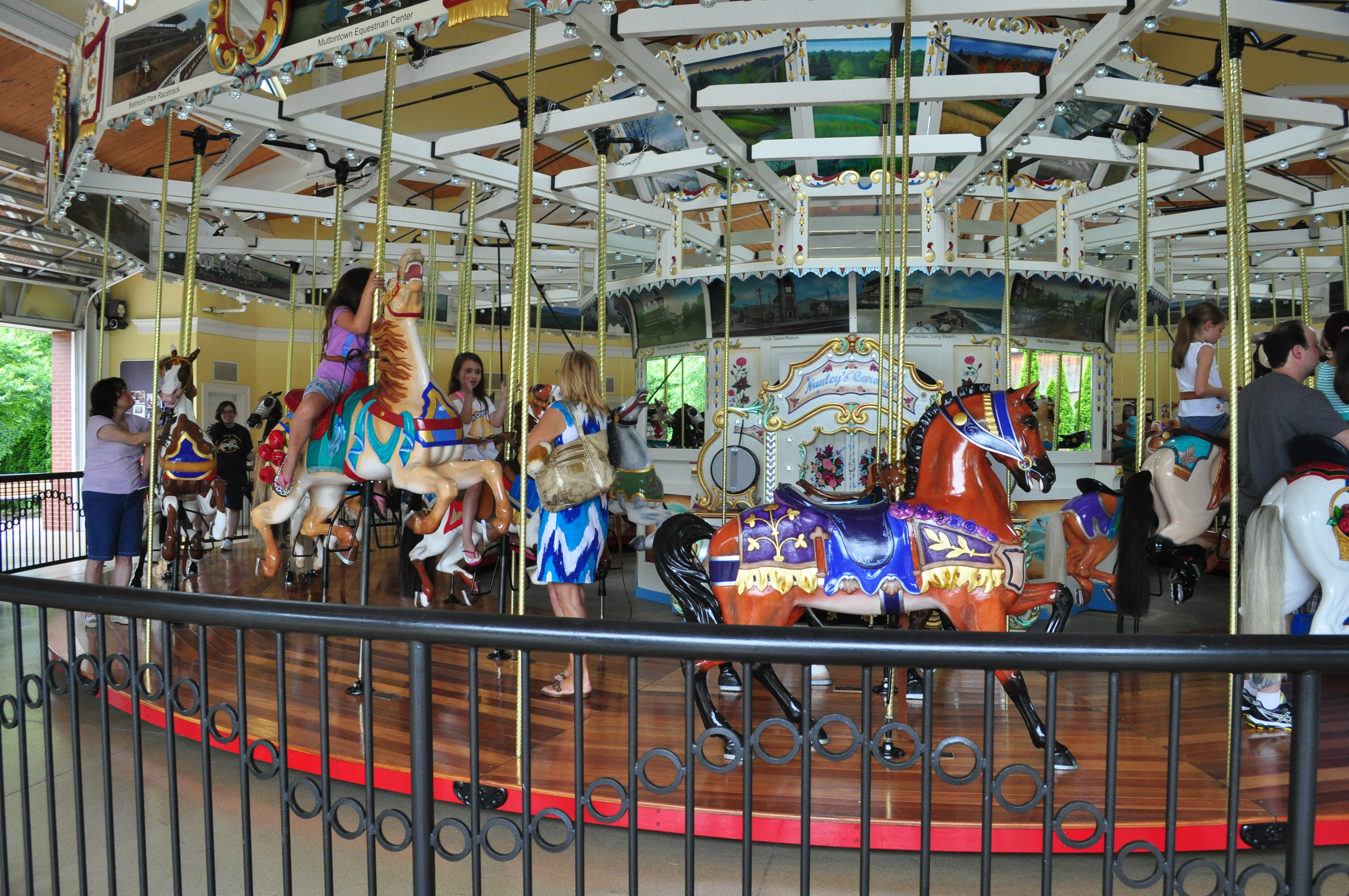
Nunley's carousel, formerly located in Canarsie

The Canarsie Line faced a steep drop in patronage in 1895, when frequent trolley service started operating to Coney Island. The line, which had operated a fleet of at least 10 vessels throughout its existence, stopped operating in 1905. The Canarsie Railroad, a subsidiary of the Brooklyn Rapid Transit Company, acquired the Brooklyn and Rockaway Beach line north of Rockaway Parkway on May 31, 1906. The BRT then announced that it would build an elevated railroad to Canarsie. This spurred speculation of rapid real estate development in Canarsie. Residents started constructing water and sewer pipes, as well as paving roads, in anticipation of this new development. The route south of Rockaway Parkway became an electric trolley shuttle route.

The 25-acre (10 ha) Golden City Amusement Park opened in May 1907 at what is now Seaview Avenue, near Canarsie Pier. The owners hoped that the five-cent fare of the Canarsie Railroad would draw riders who would otherwise pay 10 cents to go to the Coney Island amusement area. Golden City cost $1 million to build and included a miniature railroad, a dance hall, a roller skating rink, and a roller coaster. There was also a 300-foot-long (91 m) wooden shorefront promenade and a 2,500-seat theater with 7,000 electric lights. The buildings were adorned with silver and gold. Part of Golden City's appeal was that it was easily accessible from Manhattan via the elevated. In August of that year, the Golden City Construction was leased to the Canarsie Amusement Company, who planned to make the park one of the world's largest. In 1909, the park was severely damaged by a fire, which also destroyed two hotels. The park was completely rebuilt for the next season.

Murphy's Carousel was created in 1912 by the Stein and Goldstein Artistic Carousell Company of Brooklyn and installed in Golden City Park. A writer for The New York Times later noted that "the horses were carved in Coney Island style, which eschewed the look of docile ponies and prancing fillies and produced much more muscular, ferocious creatures with bared teeth and heads often lifted in motion."

After the end of World War I, the New York City Department of Docks started renting piers along the Canarsie shore. These piers were transformed into summer vacation houses, boardwalks, industrial buildings, railroads, and piers, among other purposes. Some piers were used by boat yards, clubs, and builders, while other piers were rented for an expansion of Golden City Park.

=== Decline of fishing and amusement ===
By the 20th century, the fishing industry started to decline, since pollution had contaminated the oysters that occupied the bay. The shellfish in the bay began showing signs of chemical contamination in 1904, when an outbreak of typhoid fever was linked to a catch of shellfish in Inwood, New York, another town on the Jamaica Bay shore. In 1912, a typhoid outbreak in upstate Goshen, New York, was attributed to a banquet where Jamaica Bay oysters were served. In 1915, Canarsie itself was affected when 27 residents contracted typhoid from that year's shellfish catch. Another 100 cases of gastroenteritis were traced to that year's shellfish catch. By 1917, an estimated 50,000,000 US gallons (190,000,000 L) of sewage per day was being discharged into the bay. The whole industry was shuttered in 1921 because too much of the shellfish population had been infected.

The shoreline was further altered in 1926 through the construction of Canarsie Pier, a 250-yard-long (230 m) dock with a 300-yard-wide (270 m) base. The pier was built as part of the greater improvement project for Jamaica Bay, wherein channels were being dredged in an effort to turn the bay into a large seaport. This was tied to improvement projects at Mill and Barren islands. This brought new industrial tenants along the Jamaica Bay shore, including an asphalt company and a construction company. The first industrial export from Canarsie Pier, a 500-ton shipment of scrap metal, departed in 1933. Planners also wanted to create a spur of the Long Island Rail Road's Bay Ridge Branch south to Flatlands, with two branches to Canarsie and Mill Basin. In January 1931, the New York City Board of Estimate approved a plan to build railroads on both sides of Paerdegat Basin, connecting the LIRR to Canarsie Pier on the east and to Floyd Bennett Field on the west. Ultimately, Robert Moses, the New York City Parks Commissioner at the time, disapproved of the project. He moved to transform the bay into a city park instead.

The Canarsie Railroad was converted to the Canarsie subway line in 1928, providing direct access to Manhattan. After the subway line opened, officials began calling for a new ferry service between Canarsie and Rockaway Beach. The subway line was also supposed to help improve access to the proposed seaport, although the seaport was ultimately not built. The area remained a relatively remote outpost through the 1920s. Southern Italian immigrants, along with Jews, soon settled in the area.

Golden City was severely damaged by another fire in January 1934, which destroyed fifteen buildings and caused $60,000 worth of damage. This time, the amusement park's operators decided not to rebuild, and the area spent its last days as a boat dock. In 1938, the city moved to acquire Golden City's land, as well as improve sewage facilities within Canarsie. The hope was that the new Belt Parkway would attract drivers to Golden City from all over the metropolitan area. This did not happen, mainly because Robert Moses wanted to build the parkway through the amusement park. Golden City was demolished in 1939 to make way for the Belt Parkway. In the spring of 1940, when the Belt Parkway was built through the area, the carousel was moved to Baldwin, on the border abutting Freeport, on Long Island. The Works Progress Administration, in conjunction with the city's Departments of Parks and Docks, built a recreation building on Canarsie Pier in 1941.

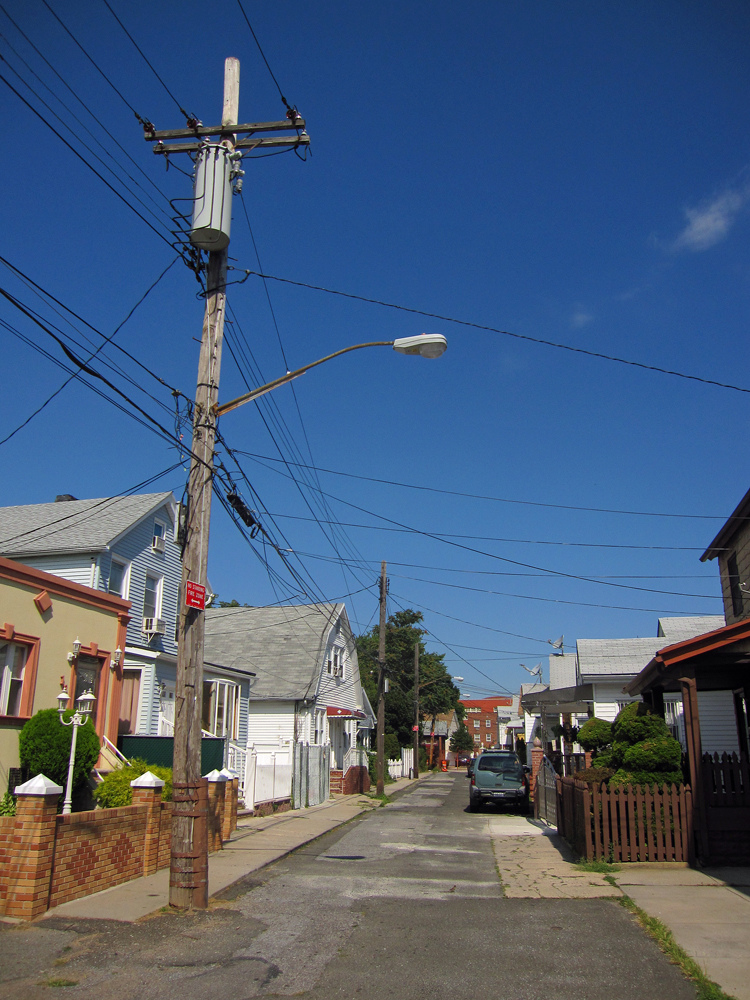
Bungalows in Canarsie

Ferry service at Canarsie Pier also withered away after the opening of the Marine Parkway–Gil Hodges Memorial Bridge in 1937, which connected Brooklyn to the Rockaways directly. In 1939, the WPA Guide to New York City mentioned that Canarsie was a "sparsely settled community located on dispiriting flatlands". The Guide further described the burned-down amusement park, the ramshackle shacks, and Canarsie's "weedy lots and small truck farms cultivated by Italians". The book stated that riders on the Canarsie Pier trolley could see "great stenches of dump and marsh" interspersed between the "unkempt gardens of run-down houses" that the trolley's route adjoined. Until 1939, dozens of disused trolley cars from around the city were dumped into a 7-acre (2.8 ha), 35-foot-deep (11 m) lake in Canarsie. The Canarsie Pier trolley route was discontinued in 1942 and was replaced by the B42 streetcar (later bus) route, despite residents' protests. The right-of-way of the old Canarsie Pier trolley was abandoned.

In 1940, plans for a 14,000-seat arena in Canarsie were filed. This arena was apparently not built for several decades, because in 1974, many Canarsie residents announced their opposition to a proposed 15,000-seat arena in Brooklyn. One of the proposed sites of the arena was in Canarsie. In 1941, the city announced that a new sewage plant would be built in Canarsie in order to reduce the amount of raw sewage going in Jamaica Bay.

=== Residential development ===
Canarsie only saw large residential development after World War II. Much of the area's residential buildings were built from this post-war era up until the 1970s. Marshland in the area was filled in. Due to the large shortage of housing in New York City after the war, the city announced the construction of more than a thousand Quonset huts for veterans along the Jamaica Bay shore. The first huts were delivered in February 1946, and they were ready for occupancy by June of that year.

Starting in the 1950s, a series of suburban waterfront communities were being rapidly developed in Southeast Brooklyn, including in present-day Bergen Beach, Canarsie, and Mill Basin. Most of the new residents were whites who were moving out of neighborhoods such as East New York and Brownsville, which were gaining more black residents. In August 1951, work started on the Breukelen Houses, a 1,600-unit New York City Housing Authority development between East 103rd and East 105th Streets. The development was completed in October 1952. The Bayview Houses, another NYCHA development, started construction in 1954 and opened in 1955. The latter NYCHA development included a shopping center.

Houses were also constructed by private developers, but due to zoning laws, these residences were limited to three stories high. Vacant lots remained, but they were being very quickly developed at the time. Some lots along the Paerdegat Basin shore remained undeveloped through the 1960s. One plot, in particular, was supposed to become a public housing development for lower- and middle-class families. However, the plot was privately owned, and residents of nearby houses wanted to see a private developer build two-story middle-class detached houses at that location. This plot ultimately became a middle-income housing development with units for 6,000 families, built by the city under the Mitchell-Lama Housing Program.

In conjunction with this development, the federal and city governments each awarded hundreds of thousands of money toward improving parks and beaches in Canarsie. The New York Times predicted that Canarsie could become "the next Jones Beach", a seaside resort of kinds. It was expected that there would be 5,000 more school-aged children living in Canarsie, so public and parochial schools were expanded as well. From 1950 to 1955, Canarsie's population grew from 3,500 to 4,500. By 1963, a new 69th Precinct building for the New York City Police Department had to be constructed to accommodate the growing population. Many young families moved to Canarsie, and Canarsie High School was built to handle the newcomers. Canarsie High School opened in 1964.

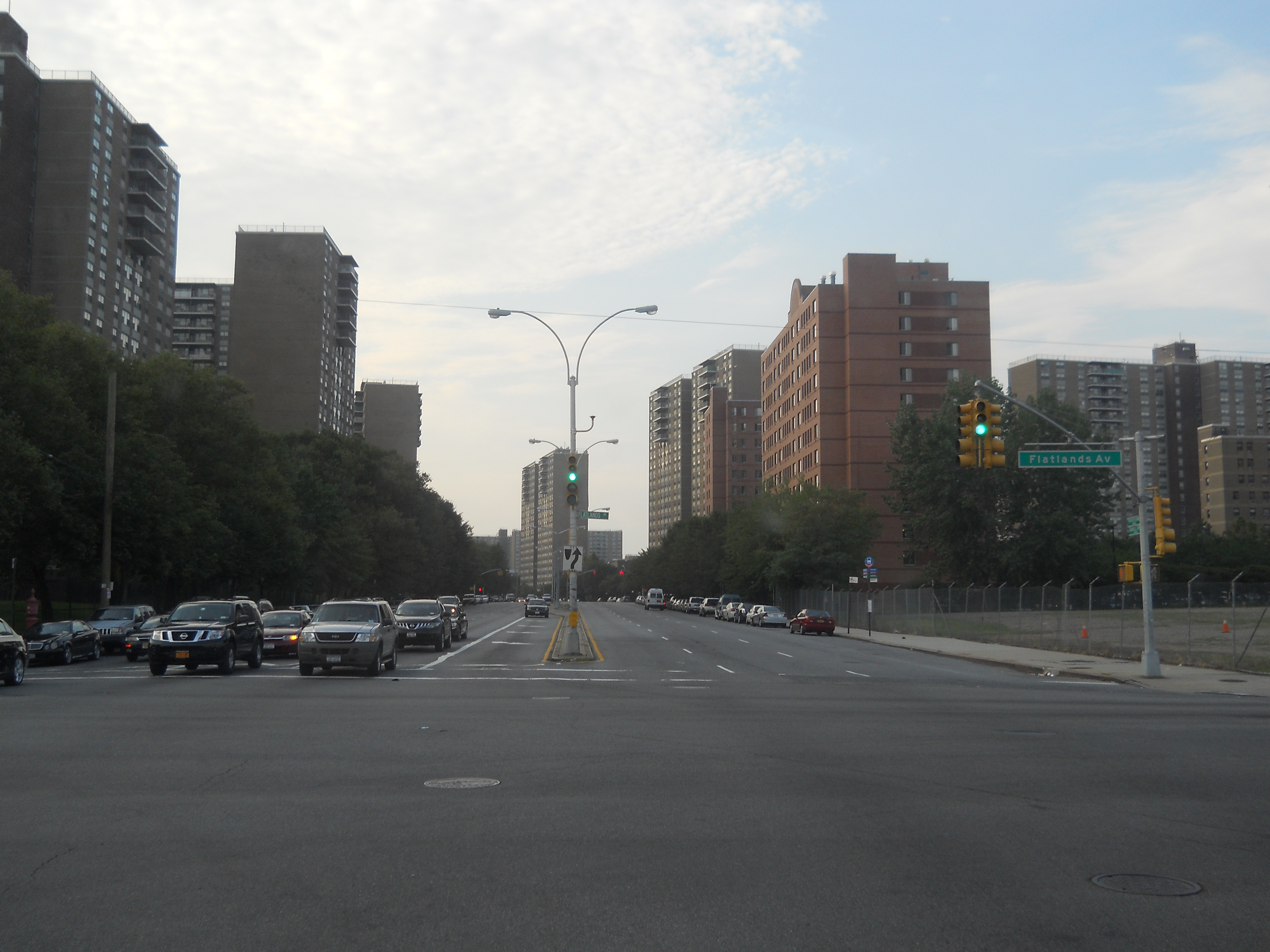
Starrett City, a 1970s-era development east of Canarsie

The city proposed the construction of Flatlands Industrial Park, an industrial park, in Canarsie in 1959. The city took over the project after a previous attempt by a private developer had been canceled in 1958 due to a lack of tenants. The industrial park was to be located on a 93-acre (38 ha) plot between East 99th and 108th Streets between Farragut Road and the Long Island Rail Road. Permission to clear the land was granted in 1962. East Brooklyn residents wished to see an educational complex on the site instead, on the grounds that not building an educational complex would prolong the school segregation prevalent in Eastern Brooklyn. The New York City Department of City Planning approved the plan anyway in 1965. The city added 6.5 acres (2.6 ha) of land to the proposed industrial area by deleting plans for the side streets that were supposed to run through the area. These delays held up construction for nine years: in March 1966, an aide to Mayor John Lindsay reported that "not one spadeful of dirt" had been excavated on the site. Construction on the project started in summer 1966, and when the Flatlands Industrial Park opened in 1969, it became the city's first publicly sponsored industrial complex.

Other development in Canarsie around this time included the middle-income Starrett City complex east of Fresh Creek. The complex is located east of Fresh Creek between Belt Parkway and Vandalia Avenue. In 1962, the California-based Thompson–Starrett Co. bought 130 acres (53 ha) of land, upon which they proposed to construct apartment buildings. However, this did not occur due to a lack of funds, and the land was sold to a consortium of investors. The project's new developers were a joint venture by the Starrett Corporation and the National Kinney Corporation, who renamed the project "Starrett City". In 1967, the United Housing Foundation (UHF) announced a plan to construct a housing development with similarities to Co-op City in the Bronx. The UHF left the project in 1972, by which time part of Starrett City had already been built. Starrett City was dedicated in October 1974, and the first residents started moving in by the end of the year. At the time of opening, it had 5,881 units in 46 eleven- to twenty-story buildings.

=== Racial tensions and growing black population ===
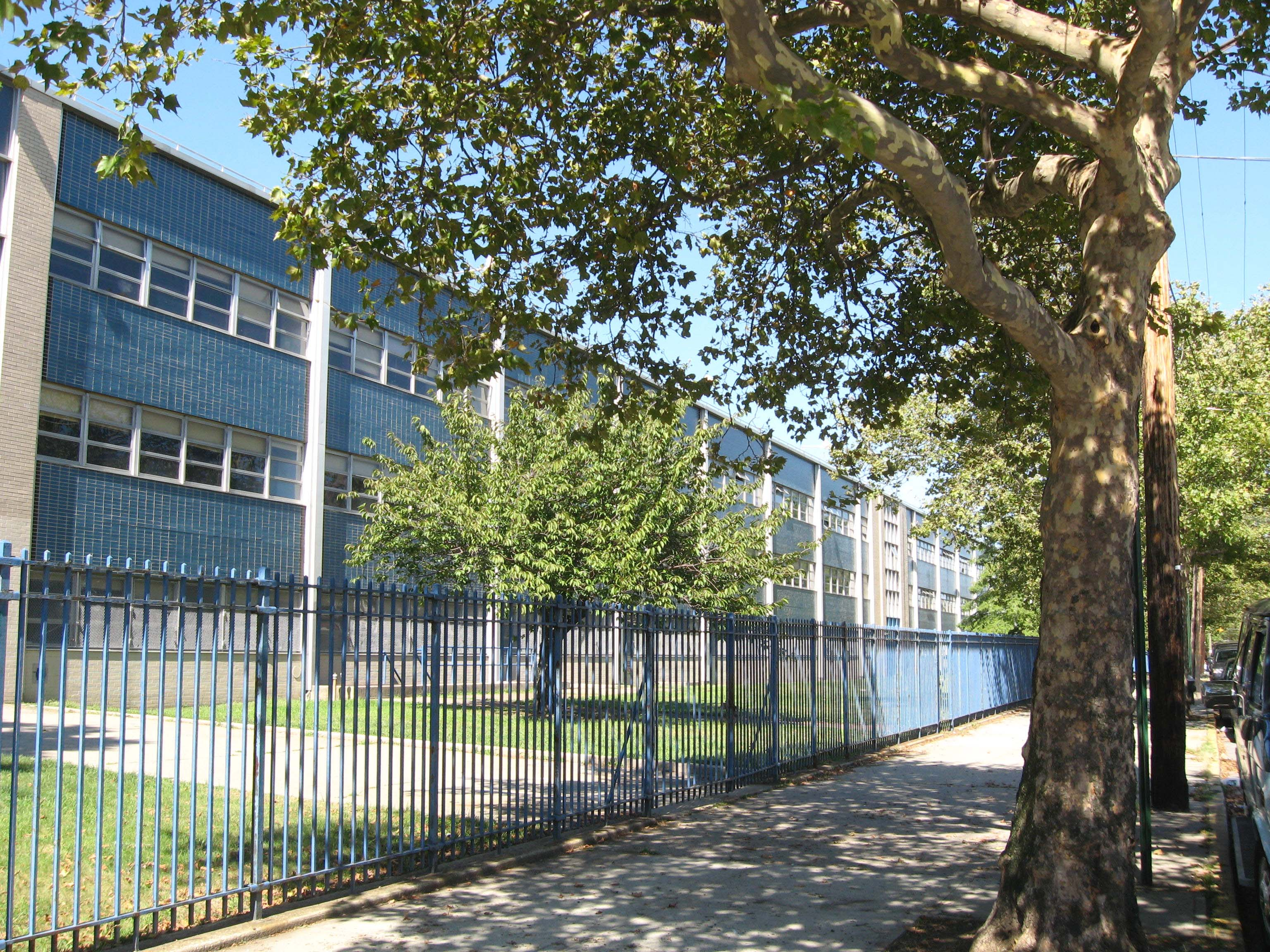
Canarsie High School, which was shuttered for three days in 1969 due to racial tensions

In the late 1960s and early 1970s, parents of white students protested against the New York City Department of Education's efforts to desegregate its District 18, which comprised schools in Canarsie and East Flatbush, by "busing" minority pupils into Canarsie schools. Many of the minority students were pupils from majority-black Brownsville, which bordered Canarsie to the north but was in a different school district. The racial tensions began in 1964, when the NYCDOE zoned some Brownsville students to Canarsie High School. In 1969, a fight between a white student and a black student at Canarsie High School caused the school to be closed down for three days. South Shore High School opened in 1970, albeit in a physically incomplete state: many rooms did not have furniture, plumbing, or public announcement systems until the middle of the school year. Major conflicts between white and black students occurred in September 1970 and April 1971. By the end of its first year, the principal was stepping down, and a coalition called "Friends of South Shore" had formed to protest the lack of resources or opportunities available at that school.

The 1972–1973 school year was a tumultuous one for Canarsie. On September 12, 1972, the first day of the school year, District 18 officials refused to enroll approximately 90 students from Brownsville into IS 285, a school in East Flatbush. This change came after IS 285 had been enrolling Brownsville students for several years. Brownsville parents had already been hesitant to enroll their students into schools in Canarsie due to large opposition there. By the start of October, these students had still not been able to start school. On October 14, the NYCDOE came up with a solution regarding approximately 40 of these students: send eleven to IS 285, and enroll the rest within IS 211 in Canarsie. (The number of Brownsville students enrolled in IS 211 was variously given as either 29 or 31. That number later rose to 32.) In response, on October 17, hundreds of white parents from Canarsie showed up to protest outside IS 211 and IS 267. They announced their intention to keep protesting unless the black students were reassigned to another school. Because the parents' protests blocked these schools' entrances, the schools were closed for the rest of that day. These protests went on for three days until the NYCDOE threatened a writ of court action against these parents.

The NYCDOE unsuccessfully attempted to broker a compromise between parents in Brownsville and Canarsie. On October 24, 1972, NYCDOE Chairman Harvey B. Scribner withdrew enrollment for the Brownsville students who were going to IS 211. The Brownsville parents brought their students to IS 211 the next day and started protesting outside the school. On October 26, the NYCDOE reversed Scribner's order, re-enrolling the black students from Brownsville. The same day, a police guard escorted 28 Brownsville students to their first day of classes at IS 211, amid a crowd of over 1,000 protesters. Of 10,000 students enrolled in Canarsie public schools, only 850 had gone to school on October 26. Due to low attendance, six Canarsie schools were closed for that day. By November 1, the fifth day of the boycott, the number of protesters had subsided, but the boycott was still ongoing. The boycott was broken on November 10, twelve days after it started. As part of the terms to end the boycott, a new zoning plan for the area was ordered. The new plan, released on December 6, was also controversial because it involved rezoning many black students. A second new plan was then ordered. Many Canarsie parents, who complained that it was taking too long to come up with a new zoning plan, initiated a second boycott on March 1, 1973. This boycott spread to a school in Mill Basin, but a similar one in Gravesend was unsuccessful. The boycott ended on April 1, after parents agreed almost unanimously to prohibit any more Brownsville students from enrolling in Canarsie schools. Students who were already enrolled were allowed to stay until they graduated. In total, white students boycotted their schools for seven weeks of the 1972–1973 school year. In 1978, a NYCDOE integration plan was tentatively approved by the state. Black students from Brownsville could enroll in Canarsie schools as long as they did not make up a majority of the student population there.

Of the 80,000 Canarsie residents in 1972, about 2.5% were black. Canarsie's black residents were mostly concentrated in the NYCHA developments, which were integrated with the detached houses in the rest of the neighborhood. The conflict was compared to the Little Rock Nine controversy in 1957, where presidential intervention had been required in order to integrate nine black students into a majority-white school. One writer described the Canarsie school conflict as a time when white residents felt that "things began to go awry". The conflict marked the beginning of white Canarsie residents' shift from liberalism to conservatism. By 1978, Canarsie was characterized as "a conservative, middle-class Jewish and Italian section of Brooklyn". The elected leadership of District 18 became ethnically disproportionate to the student body: by 1983, most of the District 18 board members were white, even though 75% of the district's students were black. This disproportionate representation continued through 1994, when the mostly-white members of District 18 opposed a plan to split off several schools into a nearby district in order to increase the proportion of black votes in both districts. That plan was subsequently canceled.

In 1989, construction commenced on the Seaview Estates condominiums. The project was characterized as Canarsie's first large new residential development in decades. The development opened in 2003.

In the 1980s, the white residents of Canarsie started moving away, and black residents started moving in. From 1980 to 1990, the proportion of Canarsie's population who was white dropped from 90% to 75%. Much of Canarsie's white population left for the suburbs of Staten Island, Queens, Long Island, and New Jersey, part of a national phenomenon referred to as "white flight". This culminated in a spate of racial conflicts in 1991, where 14 racial-bias incidents were recorded within a month and a half. These incidents were committed by both blacks against whites, and by whites against blacks. The black population of Canarsie rose from 10% in 1990 to 60% in 2000, with most of the new residents being Caribbean and West Indian immigrants. By 2010, the neighborhood was 78% black, and between 47% and 60% of the total residents were immigrants from the Caribbean.

The late-2000s subprime mortgage crisis affected the 11236 zip code, which includes Canarsie and Flatlands, more than any other neighborhood in the city. The area had 1,930 subprime mortgages, the most of any city neighborhood; of these, twelve percent were facing foreclosure proceedings. During Hurricane Sandy in October 2012, the basements of many homes in Canarsie were flooded. By June 2013, more than 10% of the residential buildings within Canarsie's zip code, 11236, were being foreclosed upon. In the aftermath of Hurricane Sandy, the Federal Emergency Management Agency started redrawing flood-risk maps in New York City to account for climate change. The original flood map in 1983 labeled 26 buildings under the FEMA "flood zone", but the new flood map proposed increasing that total to 5,000 buildings. Many area homeowners opposed the maps because they could not afford flood insurance if they were rezoned under the FEMA flood zone.

== Community ==
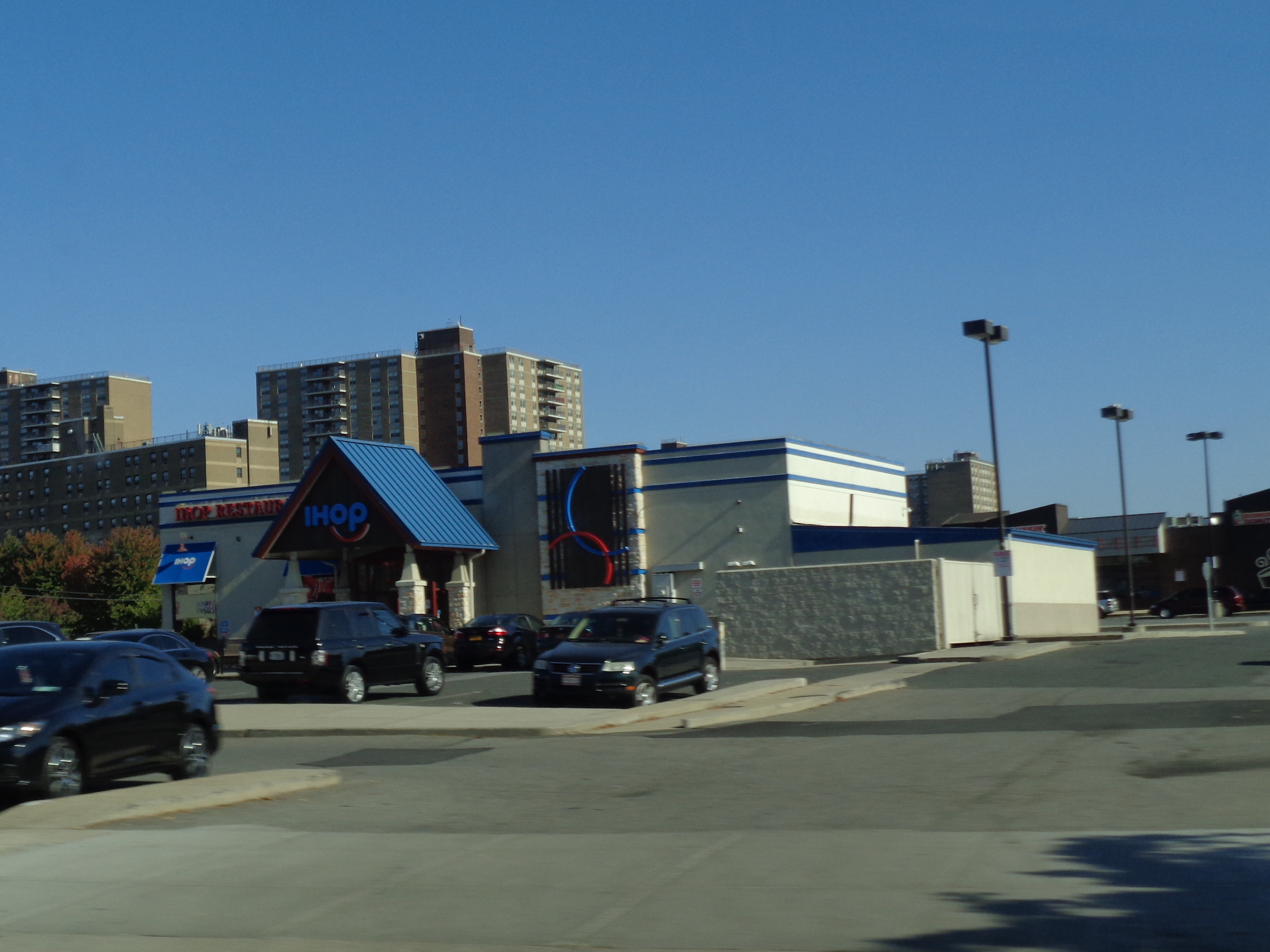
An IHOP in Canarsie

Canarsie is characterized as a middle-class neighborhood. Canarsie's residences consist mainly of one- and two-family homes. Most houses are detached, unlike elsewhere in Brooklyn where townhouses are more common. The houses between East 105th and East 108th Streets south of Avenue L typically have backyards, lawns and similar styled suburbs which unlike its neighbors Bergen Beach and Mill Basin, have not changed since the 1950s, large houses dating to the 1910s and 1920s can be found north of Flatlands Avenue. Eastern Canarsie tends to have more dense concentrations of housing than western Canarsie, while the center of the neighborhood has very dense development. There are two large public housing developments, the Breuckelen Houses and the Bayview Houses, both operated by the New York City Housing Authority. Canarsie also contains a gated community, started in 1985 and completed in 2003, the Seaview Estates condominium complex, which has five buildings as well as its own tennis court and swimming pool.

Brooklyn Community District 18, which encompasses Amersfort, Bergen Beach, Canarsie, Flatbush, Flatlands, Fraser, Georgetowne, Marine Park, and Mill Basin has a poverty rate of 11.8%, lower than the city's 20% overall poverty rate, and a homeownership rate of 60%, higher than the city's 30% overall homeownership rate.

=== Places of interest ===
There are two shopping centers in Canarsie. One of them is Canarsie Plaza, located on Avenue D. Opened in 2011, the mall contains 278,000 square feet (25,800 m^{2}) of retail space. The Brooklyn Terminal Market is located adjacent to Canarsie Plaza, and sells horticultural items such as plants, trees, and fruits.

The Canarsie Cemetery is located at Remsen Avenue and Avenue K. It was owned by the Remsen family until 1888, when they sold it to the town of Flatlands. In 1898, the cemetery became part of New York City, who became the new owner of the cemetery. Over the next century, 6,400 corpses were interred at the Canarsie Cemetery, including Civil War and Spanish–American War veterans. The city announced its intention to sell Canarsie Cemetery in 1982, but for more than 25 years, its efforts to sell were unsuccessful. Cypress Hills, the operator of another cemetery straddling Brooklyn and Queens, purchased Canarsie Cemetery in 2010. By that time, there had been 8,000 interments, with space for 6,000 more corpses.

== Demographics ==
Based on data from the 2020 United States Census, the population of Canarsie was 92,227, an increase of 8,534 (9.24%) from 83,693, and a decrease of 1,365 (1.6%) from the 85,058 counted in 2010. Covering an area of 1,959.94 acres (793.16 ha), the neighborhood had a population density of 42.7 inhabitants per acre (27,300/sq mi; 10,600/km^{2}). The racial makeup of the neighborhood was 79.4% (73,131) African American, 3.8% (3,488) non-Hispanic White, 0.3% (276) Native American, 2.0% (1,871) Asian, 0.0% (8) Pacific Islander, 2.9% (2,669) from other races, and 1.5% (1,278) from two or more races. Hispanic or Latino of any race were 8.5% (7,845) of the population.

The entirety of Community District 18, which comprises Canarsie and Flatlands, had 165,543 inhabitants as of NYC Health's 2018 Community Health Profile, with an average life expectancy of 82.0 years. This is slightly higher than the median life expectancy of 81.2 for all New York City neighborhoods. Most inhabitants are middle-aged adults and youth: 25% are between the ages of 0–17, 29% between 25 and 44, and 24% between 45 and 64. The ratio of college-aged and elderly residents was lower, at 9% and 13% respectively.

As of 2019, the median household income in Community District 18 was $80,471. In 2018, an estimated 11.7% of Canarsie and Flatlands residents lived in poverty, compared to 21% in all of Brooklyn and 20% in all of New York City. One in twelve residents (8%) were unemployed, compared to 9% in the rest of both Brooklyn and New York City. Rent burden, or the percentage of residents who have difficulty paying their rent, is 50% in Canarsie and Flatlands, lower than the citywide and boroughwide rates of 52% and 51% respectively. Based on this calculation, as of 2018, Canarsie and Flatlands are considered to be higher-income relative to the rest of the city.

The 2020 census data from the New York City Department of City Planning shows that there were fewer than 5,000 white residents, fewer than 5,000 Asian residents, between 5,000 and 9,999 Hispanic residents, and over 40,000 black residents.

During the 1990s, much of Canarsie's white population left for the suburbs as part of a national phenomenon referred to as "white flight". In the early 21st century, Canarsie's population is mostly black due to significant West Indian immigration in the area. East Brooklyn Community High School serves the transfer student population.

== Police and crime ==
Canarsie is primarily served by the NYPD's 69th Precinct, located at 9720 Foster Avenue, although the small area west of the Bay Ridge Branch tracks falls under the 67th Precinct, located at 2820 Snyder Avenue. In 2019, the 69th Precinct reported 2 murders, 25 rapes, 91 robberies, 146 felony assaults, 63 burglaries, 286 grand larcenies, and 72 grand larcenies auto. Crime in these categories fell by 84.9% in the precinct between 1990 and 2019, and by 60.9% since 2001. Of the five major violent felonies (murder, rape, felony assault, robbery, and burglary), the 69th Precinct had a rate of 456 crimes per 100,000 residents in 2019, compared to the boroughwide average of 571 crimes per 100,000 and the citywide average of 572 crimes per 100,000. As of 2021, Canarsie’s significant decrease in crimes recently ranked the sixth-safest neighborhood for total crime among 22 neighborhoods in Brooklyn and 29th-safest overall among all New York City neighborhoods.

As of 2018, Community District 18 has a non-fatal assault hospitalization rate of 46 per 100,000 people, compared to the boroughwide and citywide rates of 49 per 100,000. Its incarceration rate is 380 per 100,000 people, compared to the boroughwide rate of 460 per 100,000 and the citywide rate of 425 per 100,000.

In 2019, the highest concentrations of felony assaults in Canarsie were near the intersection of 93rd Street and Avenue L, where there were 6, and on Farragut Road between 105th and 108th streets, where there were also 6. The highest concentrations of robberies were near the intersection of 103rd Street and Glenwood Road, where there were 4, and at the nearby intersection of 105th Street and Glenwood Road, where there were also 4.

== Fire safety ==
Canarsie is served by the New York City Fire Department (FDNY)'s Engine Co. 257/Ladder Co. 170/Battalion 58, located at 1361 Rockaway Parkway.

== Health ==
Preterm births are more common in Canarsie and Flatlands than in other places citywide, though births to teenage mothers are less common. In Canarsie and Flatlands, there were 89 preterm births per 1,000 live births (compared to 87 per 1,000 citywide), and 11.6 births to teenage mothers per 1,000 live births (compared to 19.3 per 1,000 citywide). Canarsie and Flatlands has a relatively low population of residents who are uninsured, or who receive healthcare through Medicaid. In 2018, this population of uninsured residents was estimated to be 21%, which is higher than the citywide rate of 12%.

The concentration of fine particulate matter, the deadliest type of air pollutant, in Canarsie and Flatlands is 0.0071 milligrams per cubic metre (7.1×10^{−9} oz/ft^{3}), lower than the citywide and boroughwide averages. Fifteen percent of Canarsie and Flatlands residents are smokers, which is slightly higher than the city average of 14% of residents being smokers. In Canarsie and Flatlands, 30% of residents are obese, 14% are diabetic, and 37% have high blood pressure—compared to the citywide averages of 24%, 11%, and 28% respectively. In addition, 21% of children are obese, compared to the citywide average of 20%.

Eighty-one percent of residents eat some fruits and vegetables every day, which is lower than the city's average of 87%. In 2018, 77% of residents described their health as "good", "very good", or "excellent", slightly less than the city's average of 78%. For every supermarket in Canarsie and Flatlands, there are 9 bodegas.

== Post offices and ZIP Codes ==
Canarsie and Flatlands are covered by ZIP Codes 11234, 11236, and 11239, which covers the Spring Creek section of the East New York neighborhood. The United States Post Office's Canarsie Station is located at 10201 Flatlands Avenue.

== Recreation ==
=== Canarsie Pier ===
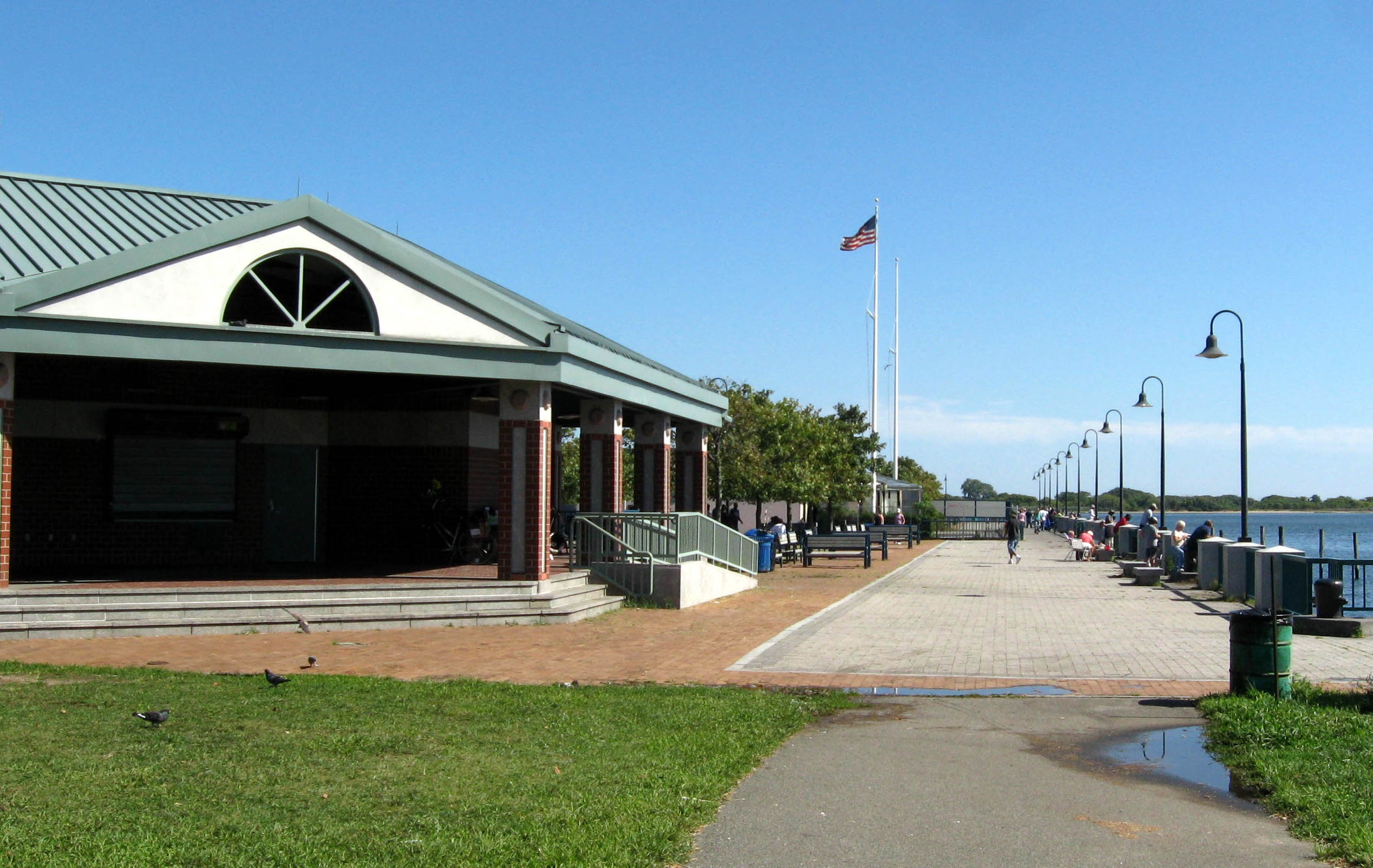
Canarsie Pier

Canarsie Pier, a fishing spot and recreation and community area on Jamaica Bay, is located in the southern part of the neighborhood at the end of Rockaway Parkway. Once a place from which members of the indigenous Canarsie tribe launched canoes into Jamaica Bay, the pier is now part of the Gateway National Recreation Area's Jamaica Bay Unit, operated by the National Park Service. The city renovated the pier in 1971, and the NPS spent $5 million to renovate the pier again in 1992. The pier contains a restaurant and a visitor center.

=== Canarsie Park ===
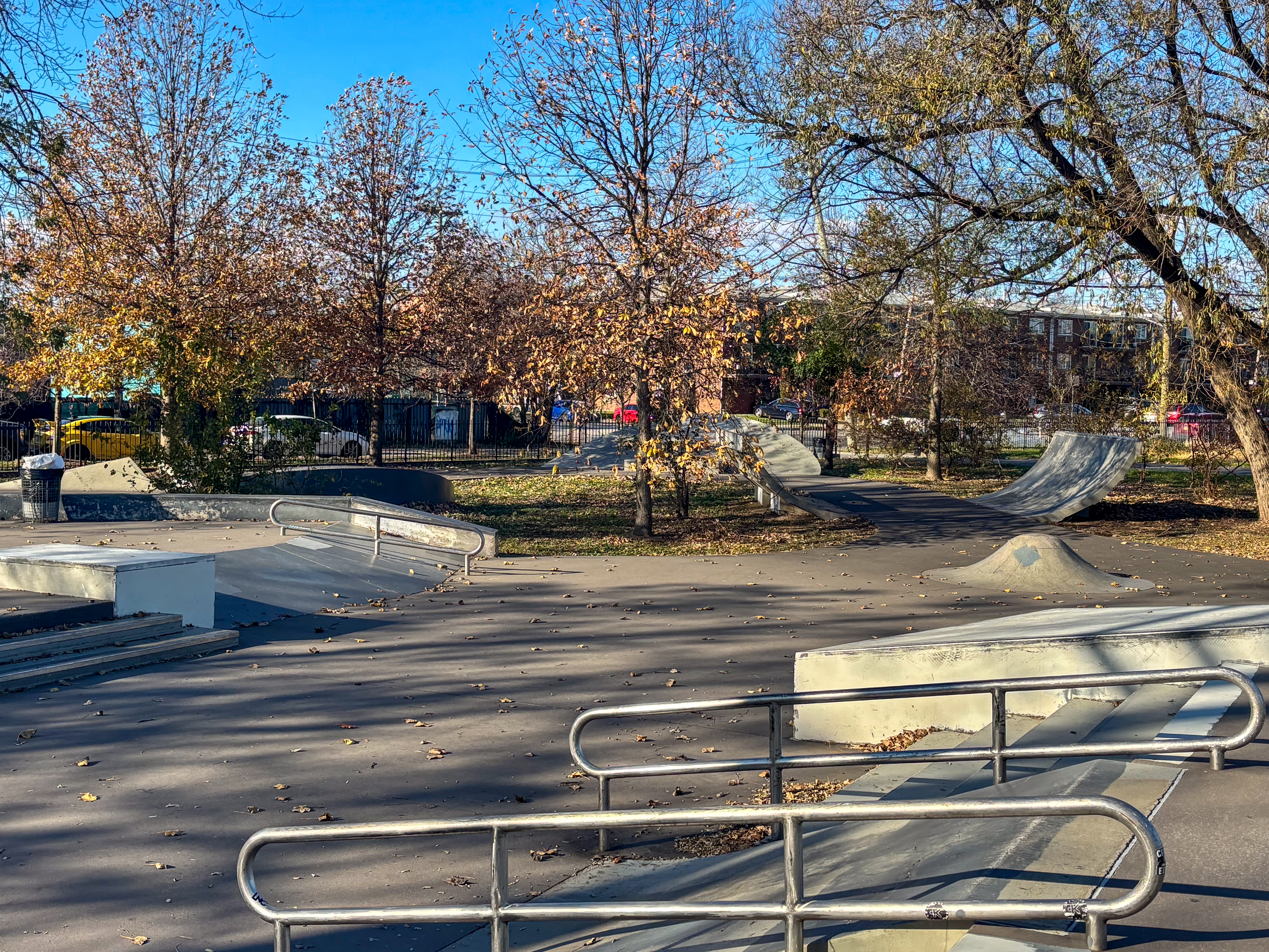
Canarsie Park includes the Canarsie Skate Park, which was renovated and reopened in 2012.

Canarsie Park (aka Seaview Park), operated by New York City Department of Parks and Recreation (NYC Parks), is located in two pieces south of Seaview Avenue: one west of East 93rd Street, and another east of East 102nd Street. In 1895 and 1896, the city acquired the plot of land bound by East 88th and East 93rd Streets between Seaview and Skidmore Avenues. At the time, the land contained the Jans Martense Schenck house. The park was expanded in 1934 after the city purchased land from the Department of Docks, and a playground was built at Seaview Avenue and East 93rd Street in 1936. Canarsie Park grew again in 1939 and 1948 using parcels from the New York City Board of Estimate. A fourth expansion occurred in 1954 when some land next to Fresh Creek Basin was purchased. The Seaview Avenue playground was renovated in the mid-1990s. Canarsie Park was renovated in the 2000s. During the renovation, a skatepark, a cricket field, and a nature trail were added. This renovation, and the upkeep of other parks in Canarsie, was attributed to an infusion of $13 million in funds from City Councilman Lewis A. Fidler, who represented Community Board 18 at the time. There are also facilities for baseball, soccer, basketball, and tennis, as well as a dog run. New York Road Runners hosts a weekly 3-mile (4.8 km) Open Run in the park.

=== Other parks ===
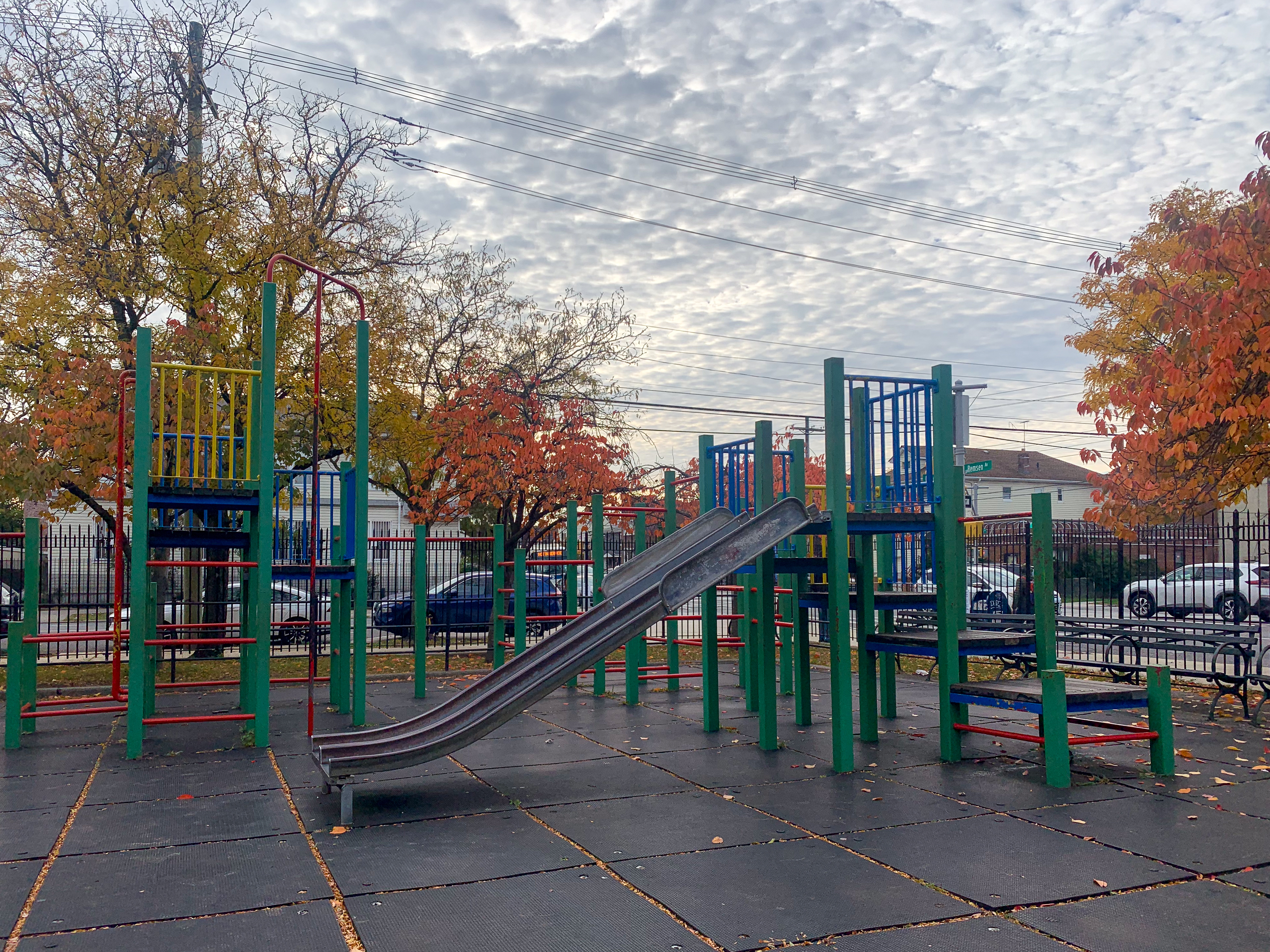
Remsen Park is located in Canarsie next to PS 114.

The neighborhood has several other parks operated by NYC Parks. Bayview Playground is located at Seaview Avenue and East 100th Street, within the Bayview Houses and next to PS 272. The original plot for the playground was acquired in 1955, and NYCHA gave additional land in 1962. Bayview Playground contains basketball and handball courts, as well as a play area and fitness area.

Bildersee Playground is located on Flatlands Avenue between East 81st and East 82nd Streets. Its namesake, Isaac Bildersee, was an assistant public school superintendent for Brooklyn during the 1940s. The city purchased the land in 1960 so it could construct IS 68, the Isaac Bildersee School, along with an accompanying playground. Bildersee Playground opened along with the school in 1965. It contains basketball and handball courts, as well as a play area.

Curtis Playground is located on Foster Avenue between East 81st and East 82nd Streets. It contains basketball courts as well as fitness and play areas.

Sledge Playground is located on East 95th Street between Holmes Lane and Avenue L. The park originally opened in 1934 on land that was acquired by the city in 1924. In 1984, it was renamed after Cecil Frank Sledge, an NYPD officer for the 69th Precinct who was killed in the line of duty in 1980. Sledge Playground was renovated in 1997–1998.

100% Playground is located on Glenwood Road between East 100th and East 101st Streets. It contains handball courts, a playground, and spray showers.

In 1978, the city proposed an additional park between East 102nd and East 108th Streets along Jamaica Bay, but residents opposed the new park because they wanted the funds to pay for existing parks' upkeep.

== Transportation ==
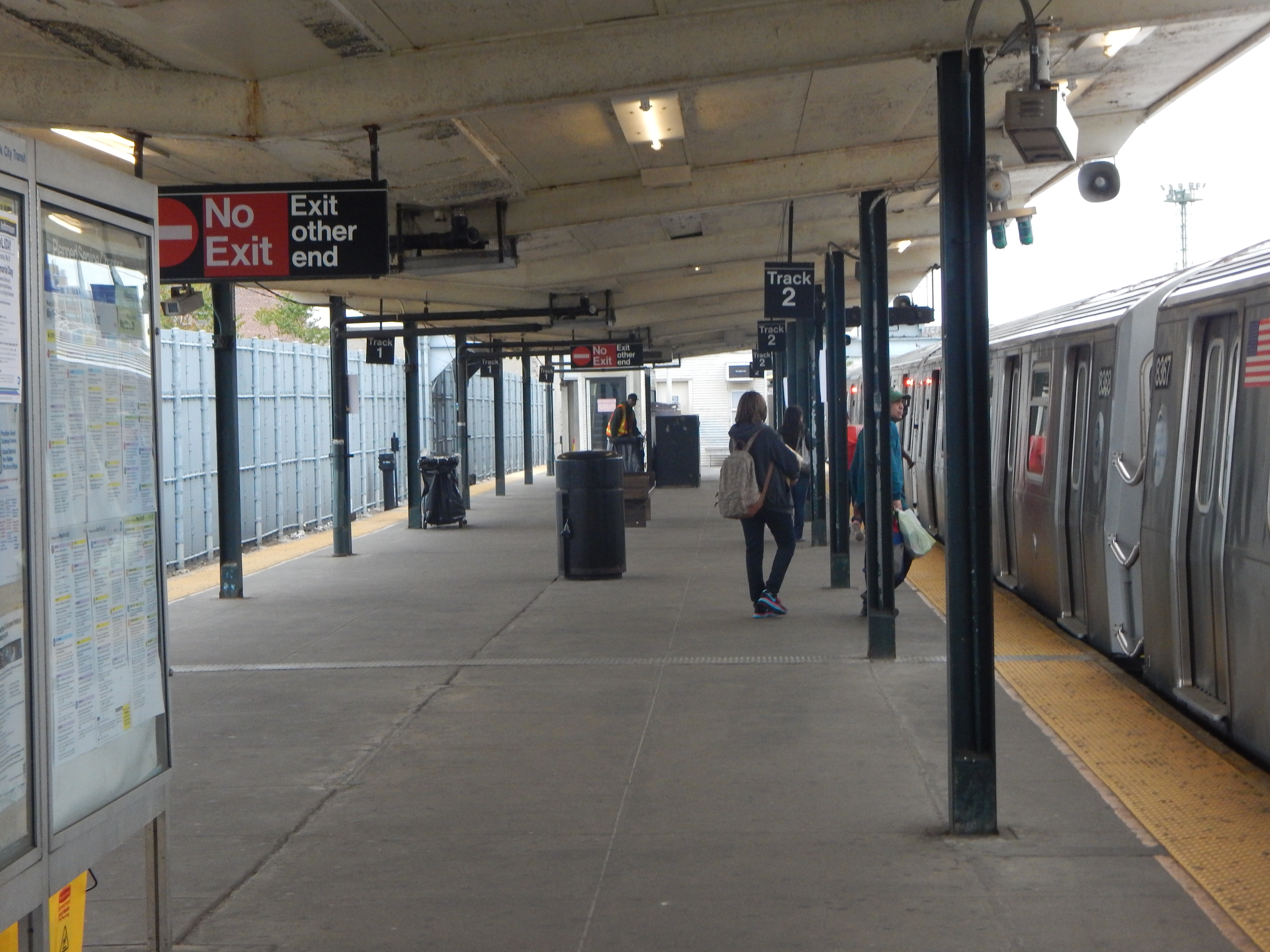
Subway platform at Rockaway Parkway

The BMT Canarsie Line, on which the New York City Subway's L train runs, terminates at Canarsie–Rockaway Parkway near the northern end of the neighborhood. There is also a subway station at East 105th Street between Foster Avenue and Farragut Road. The subway system's only level crossing was located at East 105th Street until it was closed by 1973 as part of the Flatlands Industrial Park project.

The MTA Regional Bus Operations' B6, B17, B42, B60, B82, B82 SBS, B103, and BM2 routes also run through Canarsie. The B103 route was erected on June 16, 1986 between Downtown Brooklyn and Canarsie, it originally terminated at East 94th Street and Flatlands Avenue, the BM2 had begun service 7 years prior, connecting the neighborhood with The Financial District and Midtown Manhattan. In 2009, both the B103 and BM2 were rerouted to service the Paerdegat Basin and suburbs of Canarsie, terminating at the Bruekelen Houses on Williams Avenue. The B42 route along Rockaway Parkway is a direct descendant of the former trolley route that ran to Canarsie Pier. There is a free direct transfer between the B42 and the subway at Rockaway Parkway. Other New York City Bus routes that partially serve the area are the B8 on Avenue B between Ralph and Remsen Avenues and with the B35 on Church Avenue between Remsen Avenue and East 93rd Street, as well as the B47 on Ralph Avenue between Avenue A and Flatlands Avenue, close to the East Flatbush and Flatlands neighborhoods.

The principal roadways through Canarsie are Remsen Avenue, Rockaway Parkway, and Flatlands Avenue. The Belt Parkway, a limited-access parkway, serves Canarsie via an exit at Canarsie Pier.

== Education ==
Canarsie and Flatlands generally has a similar ratio of college-educated residents to the rest of the city as of 2018. Though 40% of residents age 25 and older have a college education or higher, 13% have less than a high school education and 48% are high school graduates or have some college education. By contrast, 40% of Brooklynites and 38% of city residents have a college education or higher. The percentage of Canarsie and Flatlands students excelling in math rose from 40 percent in 2000 to 57 percent in 2011, though reading achievement decreased from 48% to 46% during the same time period.

Canarsie and Flatlands's rate of elementary school student absenteeism is slightly lower than the rest of New York City. In Canarsie and Flatlands, 17% of elementary school students missed twenty or more days per school year, compared to the citywide average of 20% of students. Additionally, 80% of high school students in Canarsie and Flatlands graduate on time, equal to the citywide average of 75% of students.

=== Schools ===
Public elementary schools in Canarsie include PS 114, PS 115, PS 272, PS 276, PS 279, IS 68, and IS 211. These schools are all operated by the New York City Department of Education (NYCDOE).

Canarsie also contains buildings formerly occupied by the South Shore High School and Canarsie High School, which now serve as educational campuses. In late fall 2006, Mayor Michael Bloomberg announced that five troubled high schools would close by 2010, including South Shore and Canarsie High Schools. According to a NYCDOE spokesperson, the closings were attributed to "dismal graduation rates, consistent low test scores, a poor history of educating, low performing students, and lackluster demand."

Canarsie and Flatlands generally has a similar ratio of college-educated residents than the rest of the city as of 2018. A 2018 study found that 38% of residents age 25 and older have a college education or higher, but 14% have less than a high school education and 49% are high school graduates with some college education. By contrast, 38% of Brooklynites and 41% of city residents have a college education or higher. The percentage of Canarsie and Flatlands students excelling in math has increased from 40 percent in 2000 to 57.4 percent in 2011, but within the same time period, reading proficiency dropped from 48% to 45.6%.

=== Libraries ===
The Brooklyn Public Library (BPL) has two branches in Canarsie. The Canarsie branch is located at 1580 Rockaway Parkway near Avenue J. It opened in 1909 with a small circulating connection and became a BPL branch in 1932. Since then, it has relocated twice to accommodate high patronage. The Jamaica Bay branch is located at 9727 Seaview Avenue between Rockaway Parkway and East 98th Street, and it opened in 1973. In addition, the Paerdegat branch is located just west of Canarsie, at 850 East 59th Street near Paerdegat Avenue South.

== Media ==
The Canarsie Courier, published every Thursday, is the oldest weekly publication in Brooklyn and is still in publication. It was founded by Walter S. Patrick on April 22, 1921. The Courier was then purchased by brothers Bob and Joe Samitz in 1959. After the death of Joe Samitz, Mary Samitz became co-publisher of the paper with her husband Bob and then became the sole publisher after Bob's death in 1998. The Samitz family then sold the paper to Donna Marra and Sandra Greco. Marra became the sole publisher in 2010.

== Notable residents ==
Notable current and former residents of Canarsie include:

- Danielle Brisebois (born 1969), former child actress (Archie Bunker's Place) and musician (New Radicals)
- John Brockington (1948-2023), running back who played in the NFL for the Green Bay Packers and Kansas City Chiefs
- Frank Carone (born 1969), political figure and lawyer, who served as Chief of Staff for Mayor of New York City Eric Adams
- Peter Criss (born 1945), rock musician with Kiss
- Patrick Clark (1955–1998), chef
- Warren Cuccurullo (born 1956), rock musician, went to Canarsie High School
- Michael De Luca (born 1965), film producer
- Flipp Dinero (born 1995), American rapper
- The Fat Boys, rap group
- William Forsythe (born 1955), actor
- World B. Free (born 1953 as Lloyd Free), former professional basketball player
- Randy Graff (born 1955), Tony Award-winning actress
- Alisha Itkin (born 1968), 1980s dance music singer
- Steven Keats (1945–1994), actor
- Dusty Locane (born 1999), drill rapper
- Mark Morales, rap artist, member of the Fat Boys
- Dan Morogiello (born 1955), professional baseball player
- Necro (born 1976), rapper and producer
- Diane Noomin (born 1947), underground cartoonist
- Al Roker (born 1954), broadcaster
- Wayne Rosenthal (born 1965), former professional baseball player and coach
- John Salley (born 1964), four-time NBA champion.
- Lance Schulters (born 1975), professional football player
- Howard Schultz (born 1953), chairman of Starbucks Coffee Company
- Annabella Sciorra (born 1960), actress
- Evan Seinfeld (born 1967), lead singer of Biohazard and actor
- Richard Sheirer (1946–2012), former director of the New York City Office of Emergency Management
- Joel Sherman, sportswriter
- Curtis Sliwa (born 1954), founder of the Guardian Angels.
- Pop Smoke (1999–2020), drill rapper.
- Stuart Sternberg (born 1959), owner of Major League Baseball's Tampa Bay Rays.
- Rah Swish (born 1997), drill rapper
- Lou Vairo (born 1945), coach of 1984 U.S. Olympic ice hockey team.
- Leon Williams (born 1983), professional football player who played linebacker in the NFL for the Cleveland Browns, Dallas Cowboys and the Kansas City Chiefs.
