= Community boards of Brooklyn =

New York City community boards

Map of community districts in the City of New York

Community boards of Brooklyn are New York City community boards in the borough of Brooklyn, which are the appointed advisory groups of the community districts that advise on land use and zoning, participate in the city budget process, and address service delivery in their district.

Community boards are each composed of up to 50 volunteer members appointed by the local borough president, half from nominations by City Council members representing the community district (i.e., whose council districts cover part of the community district). Additionally, all City Council members representing the community district are non-voting, ex officio board members.

== History ==
The 1963 revision of the New York City Charter extended the Borough of Manhattan's "Community Planning Councils" (est. 1951) to the outer boroughs as "Community Planning Boards", which are now known as "Community Boards".

The 1975 revision of the New York City Charter set the number of Community Districts/Boards to 59, established the position of the district manager for the community districts, and created the Uniform Land Use Review Procedure (ULURP) which gave the community boards the authority to review land use proposals such as zoning actions, and special permits.

== Community boards ==
Borough	Borough President (B.P.)	Number of Districts	Max. number of B.P. appointees	Max. number of all appointees
Brooklyn	Antonio Reynoso	18	450	900

=== Brooklyn Community Board 1 ===
Brooklyn Community Board 1 encompasses Williamsburg and Greenpoint. It is delimited by the Newtown Creek and Queens Borough line on the east, Flushing and Kent Avenue on the south, as well as by the East River on the west.

=== Brooklyn Community Board 2 ===
Brooklyn Community Board 2 includes Brooklyn Heights, DUMBO, Vinegar Hill, Fulton Mall, Boerum Hill, Fort Greene, Brooklyn Navy Yard, Fulton Ferry, and Clinton Hill. It is delimited by East River on the west and the north, by Kent and Classon Avenues on the east, as well as by Atlantic Avenue, Pacific Street, 4th Avenue, Warren and Court Streets on the south.

=== Brooklyn Community Board 3 ===
Brooklyn Community Board 3 includes Bedford–Stuyvesant, Stuyvesant Heights, and Ocean Hill. It is delimited by Classon Avenue on the west, Flushing Avenue, Broadway and Saratoga Avenue on the north, by Kent and Classon Avenues on the east, as well as by Atlantic Avenue on the south.

=== Brooklyn Community Board 4 ===
Brooklyn Community Board 4 includes Bushwick. Its boundaries currently extend from Flushing Avenue on the north, Broadway on the southwest, the border with Queens to the northeast, and the Cemetery of the Evergreens on the southeast.

=== Brooklyn Community Board 5 ===
Brooklyn Community Board 5 includes East New York, Cypress Hills, Highland Park, New Lots, City Line, and Starrett City. It is delimited by Van Sinderen Avenue on the west, the Queens Borough line on the north and on the east, as well as by the Gateway National Recreation Area, Louisiana and Stanley Avenue on the south.

=== Brooklyn Community Board 6 ===
Brooklyn Community Board 6 includes Red Hook, Carroll Gardens, Park Slope, Gowanus, and Cobble Hill. It is delimited by Upper New York Bay and East River on the west, Atlantic Avenue, Court Street, 4th Avenue, Warren and Pacific Street on the north, Prospect Park on the east, as well as by the 15th Street and the Gowanus Canal on the south.

=== Brooklyn Community Board 7 ===
Brooklyn Community Board 7 includes Sunset Park and Windsor Terrace. It is delimited by Gowanus Bay on the west, 15th Street and Prospect Park South West on the north, Caton Avenue, Fort Hamilton Parkway, 37th Street and 8th Avenue on the east, as well as by the Long Island Rail Road and Bay Ridge R.R. Yards on the south.

=== Brooklyn Community Board 8 ===
Brooklyn Community Board 8 includes Crown Heights, Prospect Heights, and Weeksville. It is delimited by Flatbush Avenue on the west, Atlantic Avenue on the north, Ralph Avenue on the east, as well as by New York Avenue, Rochester Avenue and Eastern Parkway on the south.

=== Brooklyn Community Board 9 ===
Brooklyn Community Board 9 includes Crown Heights, Prospect Lefferts Gardens, and Wingate. It is delimited by Ocean Avenue and Flatbush Avenue on the west, Eastern Parkway on the north, Rochester, East New York and Utica Avenues on the east, as well as by Clarkson Avenue on the south.

=== Brooklyn Community Board 10 ===
Brooklyn Community Board 10 includes Bay Ridge, Dyker Heights, and Fort Hamilton. It is delimited by Upper New York Bay on the west, Bay Ridge R.R. Yards and Long Island Rail Road on the north, 14th Avenue and Bay 8th Avenue on the east, as well as by Lower New York Bay on the south.

=== Brooklyn Community Board 11 ===
Brooklyn Community Board 11 includes Bath Beach, Gravesend, Mapleton, and Bensonhurst. It is delimited by Bay 8th Street and 14th Avenue on the west, 61st Street on the north, McDonald Avenue on the east, as well as by Avenue U and Gravesend Bay on the south.

=== Brooklyn Community Board 12 ===
Brooklyn Community Board 12 includes Borough Park, Kensington, Ocean Parkway, and Midwood. It is delimited by 61st Street on the west, 8th Avenue, 37th Street and Caton Avenue on the north, Coney Island Avenue, 18th Avenue, McDonald Avenue and Long Island Rail Road on the east, as well as by Avenue P on the south.

=== Brooklyn Community Board 13 ===
Brooklyn Community Board 13 includes Coney Island, Brighton Beach, Bensonhurst, Gravesend, and Seagate. It is delimited by Gravesend Bay on the west, 26th Avenue, 86th Street, Avenue Y on the north, Coney Island Avenue and Corbin Place on the east, as well as by Lower New York Bay on the south.

=== Brooklyn Community Board 14 ===
Brooklyn Community Board 14 includes Flatbush, Midwood, Kensington, and Ocean Parkway. It is delimited by Coney Island Avenue, the Long Island Rail Road, McDonald Avenue, Avenue F and 18th Avenue on the west, Parkside Avenue on the north, Bedford Avenue, Foster Avenue and Nostrand Avenue on the east, as well as by Kings Highway and Avenue P on the south.

=== Brooklyn Community Board 15 ===
Brooklyn Community Board 15 includes Sheepshead Bay, Manhattan Beach, Kings Bay, Gerritsen Beach, Kings Highway, East Gravesend, Madison, Homecrest, and Plum Beach. It is delimited by Corbin Place, Coney Island Avenue, Avenue Y, 86th street, Avenue U and McDonald Avenue, Avenue P and Kings Highway on the north, Nostrand avenue and Marine Park on the east, as well as by the Atlantic Ocean on the south.

=== Brooklyn Community Board 16 ===
Brooklyn Community Board 16 includes Brownsville, Ocean Hill and a portion of Bedford-Stuyvesant. It is delimited by East 98th street, East New York Avenue, Ralph Avenue, Atlantic Avenue and Saratoga Avenue on the west, Broadway on the north, Van Sinderen Avenue on the east, as well as by the Long Island Rail Road on the south.

=== Brooklyn Community Board 17 ===
Brooklyn Community Board 17 includes East Flatbush, Remsen Village, Farragut, Rugby, Erasmus and Ditmas Village. It is delimited by East 32nd street, Glenwood Road, Nostrand Avenue, Foster Avenue and Bedford Avenue on the west, Clarkson Avenue, Utica Avenue and East New York Avenue on the north, East 98th street on the east, as well as by the Long Island Rail Road on the south.

=== Brooklyn Community Board 18 ===
Brooklyn Community Board 18 includes Canarsie, Bergen Beach, Mill Basin, Flatlands, Marine Park, Georgetown, and Mill Island. It is delimited by Nostrand Avenue on the west, the Long Island Rail Road on the north, Van Sinderen Avenue and Louisiana Avenue on the east, as well as by Shore Parkway on the south.

== Other areas ==
Within the borough of Brooklyn there are two Joint Interest Areas (JIA), which are outside of the jurisdiction of individual community districts, and have their own district number. The two JIAs in Kings county are:

- District 55 - Prospect Park, 2010 Census population: 76
- District 56 - Brooklyn Gateway National Recreation Area, 2010 Census population: 15

== Notable members ==
- Alexa Avilés (Brooklyn CB7)
- Sara M. Gonzalez (Brooklyn CB7)
- Crystal Hudson (Brooklyn CB8)
- Diana Richardson (Brooklyn CB9)
- Khader El-Yateem (Brooklyn CB10)
- Kalman Yeger (Brooklyn CB14)
- Jeannette Gadson (Brooklyn CB16)
- Gail Reed-Barnett (Brooklyn CB17)
- Roxanne Persaud (Brooklyn CB18)

== See also ==
- Government of New York City
- Kings County Democratic County Committee
- List of Brooklyn neighborhoods
- New York City Council
- Borough president
- Borough boards of New York City
