= Sheepshead Bay-Nostrand Houses =

Public housing development in Brooklyn, New York

Sheepshead Bay Houses Sheepshead Houses
- NYCHA Property
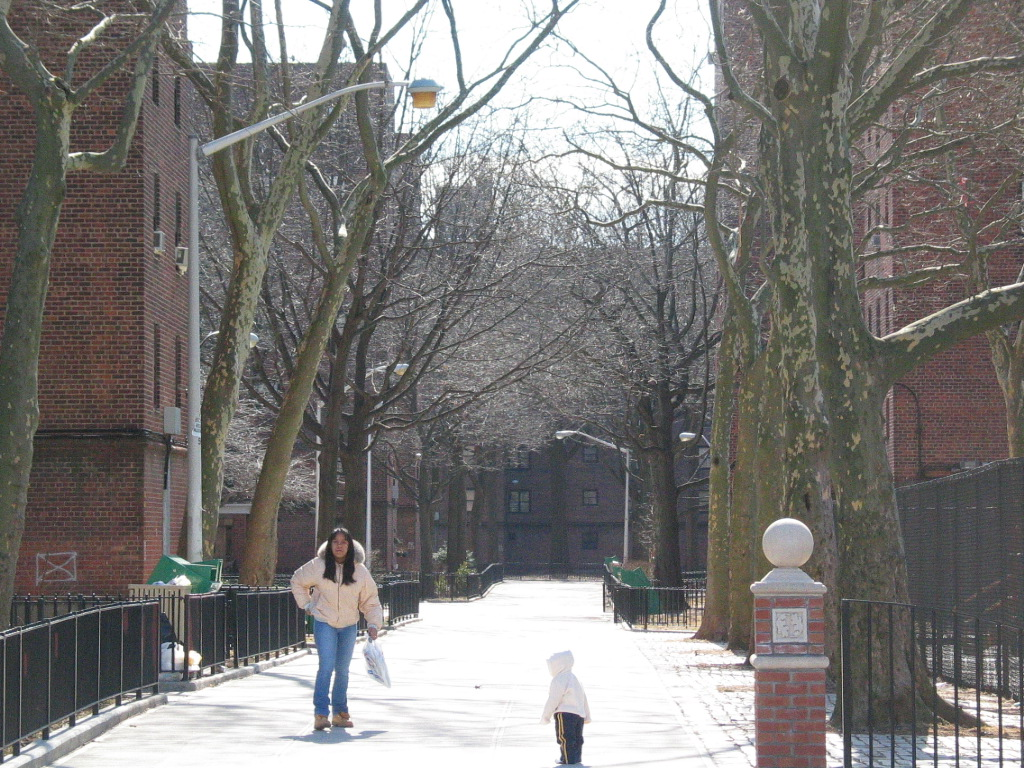
- Interactive map of Sheepshead Bay Houses
- Country: United States
- State: New York
- City: New York City
- Borough: Brooklyn

Area
  - Total: 25.06 acres (10.14 ha)

Population
  - Total: 2,083
- Zip Codes: 11229

Nostrand Houses
- NYCHA Property
- Interactive map of Nostrand Houses
- Country: United States
- State: New York
- City: New York City
- Borough: Brooklyn

Area
  - Total: 24.93 acres (10.09 ha)

Population
  - Total: 2,005
- Zip Codes: 11229
- Website: Official website

The Sheepshead Bay and Nostrand Houses are adjacent New York City Housing Authority (NYCHA) complexes in the Sheepshead Bay neighborhood of Brooklyn, New York.

== Description ==
The New York City Housing Authority (NYCHA)-owned complex consists of the Nostrand Houses, which are 16 residential buildings located between Avenues V and X on the north—south axis, and Bragg Street and Batchelder Street on the east—west axis; and the adjacent Sheepshead Bay Houses, which are 18 six-story residential buildings located between Batchelder Street and Nostrand Avenue on the east—west axis. The total area for both developments is 50 acres (20 ha), with a combined population of more than 4000. The Nostrand Houses have an upcoming $400M renovation project that will provide its 1,148 units with many upgrades.

Bordering Avenue V on Sheepshead Bay Houses is the Herman Dolgon Playground, named in 1951 for a World War II veteran who campaigned for the New York City Housing Authority to build low cost housing for veterans in the area. The park is shaded by linden trees.

=== Nostrand Houses Converted To Preservation Trust Section 8 Management ===
The Nostrand Houses was converted in late 2026 into Preservation Trust Section 8 Management after receiving enough votes from the residents for the conversion. NYCHA still manages the property though under this program instead of the traditional public housing management. Sheepshead Bay Houses still remains under regular public housing management with currently no official plans of conversions at this time.

== History ==
The property had attracted millionaires in the 19th-century. The Sheepshead Bay Racetrack was built in 1880 on the property, and was used primarily for horse racing. After the Hart–Agnew Law outlawing race track betting passed in the New York State Legislature on June 11, 1908, the track switched over to car racing, ultimately shuttering due to bankruptcy.

Plans for a 1,056 apartment development were announced in December 1947 as part of a larger plan by NYCHA to construct projects in all five boroughs of the city with an aggregate of 32,808 apartments. Partial funding had previously been announced in January of that year, with $4.918 million in notes sold for use on Sheepshead Bay and three other projects. Construction bids were scheduled for October 26. Sheepshead Bay was completed in August 1950, while the Nostrand Houses were completed in December 1950.

In 2023, the Federal Emergency Management Agency reported that the two developments are "are at risk of extreme flooding due to their proximity to a coastal water body and increased rainfall from climate change" and that $23.08 million had been allocated for a stormwater management system. In 2025, The New York Times reported that this funding had been eliminated as part of a $325 million reduction in federal funding to New York State.

== See also ==
- List of New York City Housing Authority properties
