= Michael A. DiSpezio =

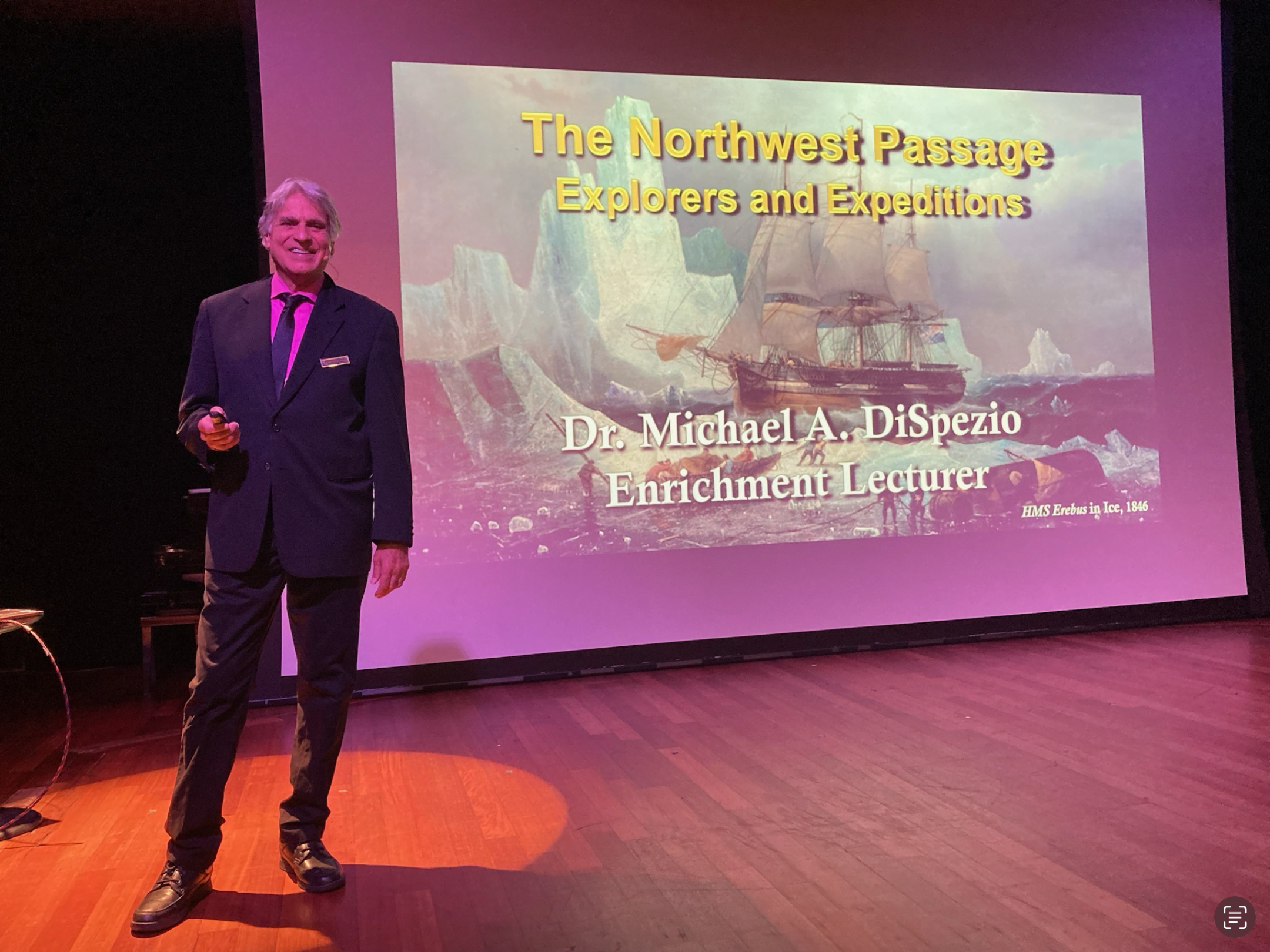
Michael speaking on cruise ship.

Michael Anthony DiSpezio (born 1953) is an American author, television host and stage edutainment performer who specializes in science and science education. He is known for his quick wit and playful style. Along with infusing his performances with humor and theatrics, he often engages audiences in hands-on activities, puzzle solving and 3D illusions.

In addition to hosting over three dozen broadcasts of National GeographicJASON Project, DiSpezio has performed stage shows at the National Geographic Auditorium in Washington, D.C.. He has also performed onstage for the Discovery Channel as well as developing the Discovery Channel Camp at the Bahama's resort Atlantis.

He is co-author of over sixty science textbooks that are used in the K-12 classroom. He has also authored several dozen tradebooks on various topics in science that range from critical thinking puzzles to HIV awareness. in 1998, his role as a member of the creative team of the television broadcast The Science of HIV/AIDS helped earn the Discovery Channel numerous awards including their first Emmy Award nomination.

In addition to his land-based global performances, Michael is also an enrichment edutainer aboard cruise ships. At sea, his style of audience engagement targets topics that range from the discovery of the Titanic to the Magic of 3D.

== Biography ==
DiSpezio grew up in Sheepshead Bay, Brooklyn. After graduating from Brooklyn College, he continued graduate research at Boston University and received a master's degree in biology. During his graduate years, he worked as a research assistant to Nobel Laureate, Albert Szent-Györgyi. After teaching at Boston University, Boston University School of Nursing and several independent day schools in New England, he went on to author his first textbook in chemistry. To date, he has coauthorship on over sixty textbooks and classroom ancillaries for publishers that include Addison-Wesley, Pearson Education, National Geographic Society and Houghton Mifflin Harcourt. After returning to graduate school in 1996, he was later awarded his doctorate in education, based upon his work in HIV/AIDS education.

In 1994, he worked in the Middle East as part of the Israel/Jordan peace accord where he trained Arab counterparts in the application of educational television production to issues in gender equality and critical thinking. He lives in Cape Cod and continues to write and speak on science, creativity, and applying brain research to increase classroom effectiveness.

== Selected publications ==
- HMH Science Dimensions Chemistry (Houghton Mifflin Harcourt Publishing), ISBN 978-0-544-86180-0
- Your 21st Century Brain (Sterling Publishing), ISBN 1-4027-7658-6
- The Science of HIV (National Science Teachers Association) ISBN 0-87355-160-5
- Dino Mania: Discovering Who's Who In the Jurassic Zoo (Sterling Publishing) ISBN 978-0-8069-8981-5
- Awesome Experiments in Light and Sound (Sterling Publishers) ISBN 1-4027-2372-5
- Science Fusion(Houghton Mifflin Harcourt Publishing Company) ISBN 978-0-547-36587-9
- Space Mania: Discovering Distant Worlds Without Leaving Your Own (Sterling Publishing) ISBN 0-8069-7287-4
- Great Critical Thinking Puzzles (Sterling Publishing) ISBN 978-0-8069-9725-4
- Science Insights (Addison Wesley) ISBN 978-0-201-33285-8
- Visual Foolery (Tormont/Brimar Publications) ISBN 2-7641-0213-5
- USA today: Weather Wonders Book & Kit (Sterling Innovation) ISBN 1-4027-6533-9
- Exploring Earth and space (Addison Wesley) ISBN 0-201-25700-9
- Heath Chemistry Lab Experiments (D.C. Heath) ISBN 978-0-669-09855-6
- Super Sensational Science Fair Projects (Sterling Publishing) ISBN 978-0-8069-4409-8
