= Vedah Bertram =

American actress (1891–1912)

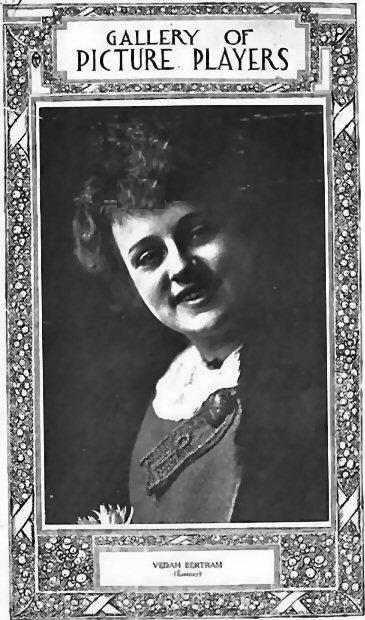
- Motion Picture Story Magazine, August, 1912
- Born: December 4, 1891; Boston, Massachusetts, United States
- Died: August 26, 1912 (aged 20)
- Occupation: Actress

Vedah Bertram (December 4, 1891 – August 26, 1912) was an American silent film actress.

== Early life ==
Vedah Bertram was born in Boston, Massachusetts as Adele Buck, daughter of Jerome H. Buck and Jennie E. Howell Buck. Her father was sometimes described as a wealthy Boston publisher or lawyer; at the time of her death, he was the advertising manager for a newspaper in Brooklyn.

Her parents divorced in 1897, and her mother died in 1907. Adele was raised in her maternal grandmother's house in Sheepshead Bay, New York. She attended Wesleyan Academy in Wlibraham, Massachusetts; some sources say she also graduated from Wellesley College. She was engaged to a man named Leavitt H. Merrill, and he followed when she moved to California to pursue a film career.

== Career ==
Broncho Billy Anderson saw Buck picture in a Boston society column and contacted her and asked her to be his leading lady in the series of silent films he was making. Due to opposition by her family, she used the name "Vedah Bertram", to help shield her family from scandal. She became an immediate success in pictures as Broncho Billy's romantic lead. In 1912, she made over 20 one-reel western films for Essenay Studios, and had a huge following. Her first film was The Ranch Girl's Mistake (1912); her last, released posthumously, was Broncho Billy Outwitted (1912).

== Death ==
In July 1912, Bertram was admitted into an Oakland hospital with stomach pains and died on August 26, aged 20, reportedly from complications after surgery for acute appendicitis. She was one of the first acknowledged movie stars to be mourned by the public. Her grave is in Woodlawn Cemetery in the Bronx.
