= Lundy's Restaurant =

Former seafood restaurant in Brooklyn, New York

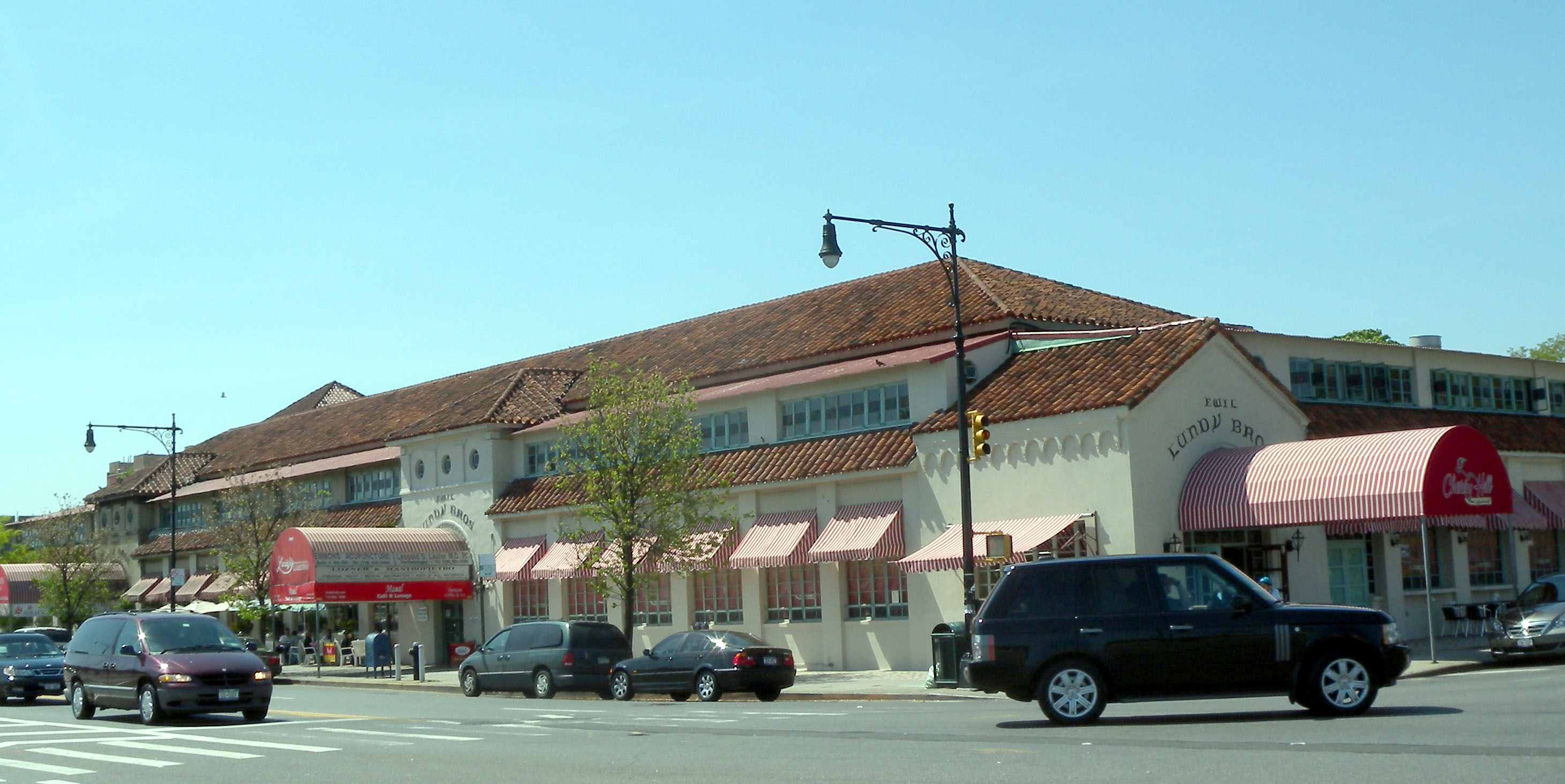
- Seen from the building's southeast corner, on Emmons Avenue

- Location within New York City Location within New York Location within the United States

Restaurant information
- Established: 1926 (first version); 1995 (second version)
- Closed: October 1979 (first version); January 2007 (second version)
- Previous owner: Irving Lundy
- Food type: Seafood
- Location: 1929 Emmons Avenue, Brooklyn, New York, 11235, United States
- Coordinates: 40°35′02″N 73°56′57″W
- Seating capacity: 2,400 to 2,800 (first version); 700 to 800 (second version)

Lundy's Restaurant, also known as Lundy Brothers Restaurant, was an American seafood restaurant in the Sheepshead Bay neighborhood of Brooklyn in New York City, along the bay of the same name. Lundy's was founded in 1926 by Irving Lundy as a restaurant on the waterfront of Sheepshead Bay; five years later, the original building was condemned to make way for a redevelopment of the bay. The present building opened in 1934 or 1935, (Note: Accounts vary on whether the restaurant opened in 1934 or 1935) and closed in 1979. Another restaurant operated in the Lundy's building from 1996 to early 2007, after which the building was converted into a shopping center.

Lundy's, the last of the many seafood restaurants that once lined Sheepshead Bay, was well known for its cuisine and was among the largest restaurants in the United States upon its completion, with between 2,400 and 2,800 seats. At its peak, Lundy's served a million patrons annually.

The building, designated by the New York City Landmarks Preservation Commission as an official city landmark, was designed by architects Bloch & Hesse in the Spanish Colonial Revival style. The building's distinguishing features include its multiple tiers of red-tile roofs, its leadlight windows, and decorative ironwork, a style of architecture that is used on few other buildings in the New York metropolitan area.

== History ==
=== Founding ===
Lundy's was founded by Sheepshead Bay native Frederick William Irving Lundy (c. 1895 – 1977; popularly known as "Irving"). Irving Lundy was the oldest of seven; his father Fred was a prominent figure in the Brooklyn Democratic Party. Several of Irving's male relatives, including his father, operated the successful Lundy Brothers fish market, which by the early 1880s sold fish, clams, and oysters wholesale at their shops in Coney Island and Sheepshead Bay. According to a 1902 biography of the Lundys, they were also selling seafood in Manhattan Beach by then.

At the turn of the 20th century, Irving Lundy started a business selling clams out of a pushcart. By 1907, he had opened a clam bar built on stilts over Sheepshead Bay. By the time he was 16, Lundy claimed to be employing several workers. Then, during World War I, he joined the United States Navy. Irving Lundy's brothers Clayton and Stanley died in January 1920 in a boating accident while tending the family's clam beds in Jamaica Bay.

In 1923 Irving would buy the pier for the original restaurant, located between East 21st Street and Ocean Avenue. The site had been previously operated by Henrietta Sheirr, who had operated the pier as a restaurant since 1906, initially operating with two tables; at the time, only one other seafood restaurant existed in the area. Sheirr's eatery had expanded to accommodate 235 patrons by the time Lundy purchased the pier. In 1926, Lundy closed the pier in lieu of operating the restaurant. The restaurant was decorated with the letters "F.W.I.L.," standing for "Frederick William Irving Lundy". Irving's surviving brother Allen and their three sisters would manage the restaurant. The same year, Irving Lundy was kidnapped and the restaurant was burglarized in an armed robbery, though Irving escaped relatively unharmed.

=== Relocation ===
==== Construction ====
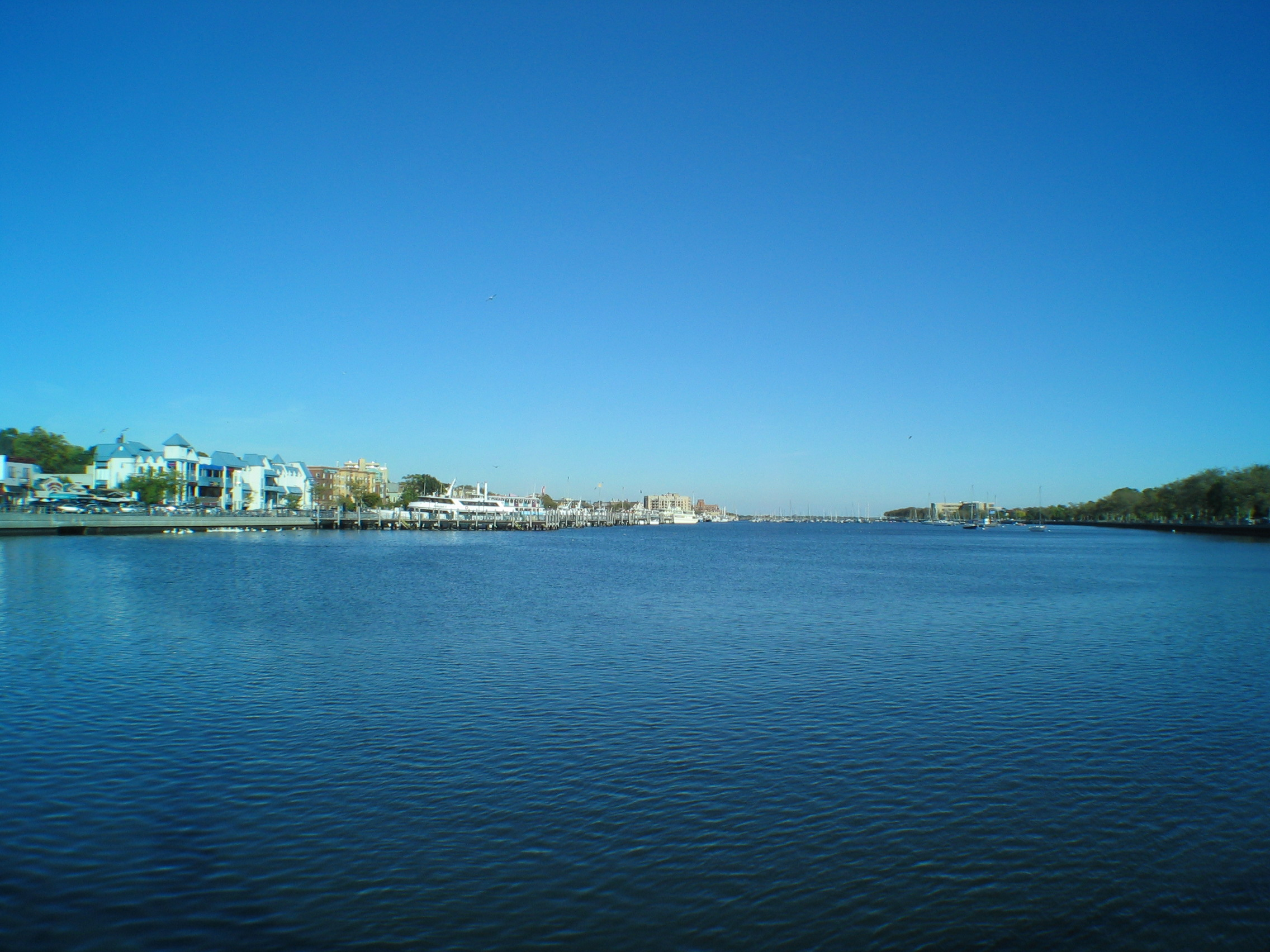
The shore of Sheepshead Bay, where the original Lundy's was located

With the development of the Sheepshead Bay community into a residential neighborhood, there were efforts to improve the facilities on the waterfront. The channel of the Sheepshead Bay waterway was dredged by 1916 to allow fishing boats to dock there, and in 1922 the New York City Dock Commission planned to dredge the bays further, build bulkheads on the shore, and widen Emmons Avenue on the waterfront from 80 to 120 feet (24 to 37 m). As part of the project, 25 piers would be built on the south side of Emmons Avenue, while 26 buildings would be built on the north side. This would make Sheepshead Bay into what the Brooklyn Daily Eagle described as a "modern Venice". Since the Sheepshead Bay development would entail the destruction of the original Lundy's location, Irving Lundy decided to rebuild his restaurant at 1901 Emmons Avenue, on the road's northern sidewalk, at the site of the Bayside Hotel and Casino. Lundy commissioned architects Ben Bloch and Walter Hesse to design the new building. By March 1932, his attorney said that "Lundy's would establish a $600,000 restaurant on the north side of Emmons Avenue as soon as the razing of the waterfront structures gets underway."

In 1931, the city condemned several buildings on the bay shore, including the original Lundy's, to widen Emmons Avenue. The Great Depression delayed further progress, as these buildings would not be destroyed until mid-1934, and construction started on new buildings on Emmons Avenue's northern sidewalk. To avoid excessive disruption to normal business, Lundy waited until the last minute to close his original restaurant. A contemporary account stated that the relocation was timed such that when the new building was opened just in time for "the shucking of the last clam in the old place." Demolition was underway by April 1934. Herb Shalat, who became a partner at Bloch & Hesse several decades later, said that "Bloch and Hesse and staff would work at all hours and bring complete or even incomplete design drawings and details to the site each morning during the building process supervised by Walter Hesse, Piero Ghiani [an architect with Bloch & Hesse] and Irving Lundy." Lundy retained Bloch & Hesse for his other Sheepshead Bay projects through the 1970s.

==== 1930s to 1960s ====
The new building opened in 1934 or 1935. In 1935, shortly after Lundy's opened, the federal government threatened to seize the restaurant because Irving Lundy had not paid taxes on liquor that he stored in the restaurant. After a federal raid and a brief closure in June 1935, a judge sympathetic to Lundy ordered an injunction against the federal government's proposal to dismantle the bar at Lundy's. That October, Lundy agreed to pay back taxes. In 1937, part of the ceiling collapsed, injuring five diners. Simultaneously, Frederick Lundy was seeking $853,000 in compensation from the New York City government for the acquisition of the original building. A state court ruled in 1939 that Lundy was only entitled to $253,000 in damages.

With the success of Lundy's Restaurant, Irving Lundy was able to buy waterfront real estate along Sheepshead Bay. In some cases, he bought the enterprises of rival restaurateurs. At one point, his holdings included all of the 70 waterfront properties on Emmons Avenue from East 19th to East 29th Streets. Lundy never resold his properties, but he did lease them to businesspeople that he liked. As a result, much of the north side of Emmons Avenue remained undeveloped through the early 1960s, even as apartment houses were developed in the rest of Sheepshead Bay. Lundy never married and became a recluse in his later life. Because of his reclusive behavior and his wealth, Lundy became known as the "Howard Hughes of Brooklyn". Despite his infrequent public appearances, Irving Lundy managed the restaurant with what one author called "an iron hand", which may have contributed to the waiters' dour expressions.

Lundy constructed the one-story Teresa Brewer Room along Ocean Avenue was constructed in 1945, naming it after the pop singer whom his nephew had married. Lundy added air conditioning to the restaurant around this time. The first labor strike in Lundy's history occurred in July 1946 when waiters walked out due to union disagreements; the strike lasted for most of that month. In 1947, Walter Hesse enclosed the patios on the second floor.

A larger strike started in July 1957, when 75 employees walked out during a dispute over wages; another 200 employees walked out soon afterward. Irving Lundy said that he would permanently shutter the restaurant if the waiters did not stop striking, claiming that he had lost control over his waiters. At the time, the restaurant served 2,000 patrons on an average weekday, which increased to 10,000 on Sundays and 15,000 during holidays. A few days after the strike started, he officially announced that Lundy's would "never reopen" due to the strike. Despite a report in September 1957 that Lundy's would reopen imminently after personnel changes, much of the restaurant except for the clam bar remained closed until a labor agreement was reached that December. The restaurant was briefly closed again in 1968 due to a seafood shortage.

==== Decline and first closure ====
By the 1970s, Lundy's was facing numerous problems, including two armed robberies in 1972 and November 1974; after a third attempted robbery in December 1974, one of the restaurant's managers got into a shoot-out with policemen after assuming that they were robbers. The restaurant was temporarily closed following an unfavorable health-inspection report in 1973, and it suffered after two of the Lundy siblings were murdered in 1975. In the years before Irving Lundy's death in September 1977, he had become increasingly reclusive, refusing even to talk to the police about the killings of his siblings. A fire damaged Lundy's that same November.

After Irving Lundy's death, his $25 million estate was distributed among a niece and three nephews. Under subsequent management, Lundy's Restaurant started to lose money, making it financially unsustainable. Changes were also occurring in the surrounding community; while Sheepshead Bay did not undergo the white flight and high crime that afflicted other New York City neighborhoods, the waterfront economy was dependent on the success of Lundy's. The last surviving Lundy siblings were unable to resolve their disputes, and officials discovered in 1979 that numerous people, including Irving Lundy's longtime chauffeur, had embezzled $11 million from the restaurant. Lundy's closed in October 1979, (Note: Two articles in The New York Times cite the year of closure as being in 1979. Another Times article in 2007 says that Lundy's had "closed after the death of the founder, Irving Lundy, in 1977", though this seems to confirm Lundy's death in 1977 rather than assert that the restaurant had closed at that date.) with a sign stating that Lundy's was "Closed for Renovations".

=== Abandonment ===
The Lundy's Restaurant building was sold to investment company Litas Group in 1981 for about $11 million. The new owners wished to build a high-rise residential development with condominiums, a nightclub, a hotel, and specialty shops on the nearly 14-acre (5.7 ha) site. The building soon became dilapidated and filled with graffiti, and other stores in Sheepshead Bay had closed in turn due to a general decline in visitors. The New York Times wrote that, even though local officials did not consider the neighborhood to be blighted, "the deteriorating wooden docks and the vacancy of Lundy's Restaurant on Emmons Avenue, a local landmark, have kept the area from attracting the number of visitors it once did". The city government had proposed converting the site to a museum, stores, and 63 condominiums in 1987 but was unsuccessful.

As early as 1986, there had been proposals to preserve the building's exterior as a city landmark, protecting it from demolition. The Sheepshead Bay Beautification Group's co-director Peter Romeo, who thought that Lundy' s abandonment affected economic development along Sheepshead Bay, started lobbying for Lundy's to be restored. Romeo began looking for developers to purchase, maintain, and restore the building. The New York City Landmarks Preservation Commission designated the building an official city landmark on March 3, 1992. The Seaside Restaurant Development Corporation, which owned the building, supported landmark designation. Immediately after the landmark designation, the owner started looking for $10 million to restore the building. At that point, the restaurant's reopening had been proposed unsuccessfully at least 12 times. With permission from the restaurant's owner, Romeo covered the graffiti on the facade with more than three dozen murals in 1993. The New York City Council approved the landmark designation that June.

=== Use as shopping plaza ===
==== Initial stores and second restaurant ====
Donald Lentnek and Steve Pappas of Lundy's Management Corporation leased the restaurant building for 49 years from the owner, Sheepshead Bay Restaurant Associates, in 1994 and began renovating it that June. Lundy's Management Corporation offered to renovate a nearby vacant lot into a public park in exchange for permission to operate a 100-space parking lot next to Lundy's. The firm began converting the Lundy's building into a small shopping center, with two restaurants on Emmons Avenue, including a scaled-down revival of Lundy's, and up to 50 stores inside. Tam Restaurant Group (headed by restaurateurs Frank and Jeanne Cretella, who also managed the Boathouse Cafe at Loeb Boathouse in Central Park) agreed to operate the scaled-down Lundy's in January 1995. Frank Cretella said he had leased the restaurant because, "whenever I talked about restaurants in Brooklyn, someone said, 'Lundy's.'" Niemitz Design Group was hired to renovate the restaurant.

Tam reopened the second Lundy's on December 6, 1995. The second iteration of Lundy's only occupied about half of the space taken up by the original eatery. The opening of the new Lundy's location spurred a wave of development on Emmons Avenue. By March 1996, property owners reported that real estate prices had doubled and that vacant apartments were being occupied. Formerly vacant lots were being developed and new restaurants and other businesses were being opened along Emmons Avenue, including two shopping plazas and a sports bar. Lundy's itself saw waiting lists of up to one month for weekend reservations, and many people called to ask if the restaurant had reopened. Despite its relative remoteness (it was nearly 10 miles from Manhattan and not easily accessible by subway or taxi), Lundy's was popular, with patrons coming from as far as eastern Long Island. The Times later wrote that the Cretellas had "helped revive Lundy's". By 1998 there was also a Japanese restaurant at the site of the original Lundy's, while the retail space was being converted into office space. The unused space later became Lundy's Landing Shopping Plaza, though the shopping space was initially unsuccessful.

Tam had planned to expand Lundy's into a brand with dozens of locations across the U.S., but this was canceled after the company began to experience financial issues in late 2000. Tam opened a branch location in 2001, at 205 West 50th Street near Manhattan's Times Square, which lasted only a short time. Lundy's temporarily closed in May 2003 after Tam failed to pay taxes, but it reopened soon afterward when Tam filed for Chapter 11 bankruptcy protection. By the next year, Tam's president Tony Golio said that "business is good". A family-owned business named The Players Club, headed by restaurateur Afrodite Dimitroulakos, acquired Lundy's from Tam in December 2004. The Dimitroulakos family expanded the restaurant's menu and added a sushi bar. Lundy's again closed in January 2007; a state judge had ordered the closure of the restaurant because the Demetroulakos family had filed for bankruptcy and had not paid rent in several months.

==== Late 2000s to present ====
After the second Lundy's closed, Lentnek sought to lease out its space. The former space of the second Lundy's was renovated and incorporated into Lundy's Landing Shopping Plaza, hosting several restaurants and businesses. Neighborhood residents felt that the new occupants of the Lundy's location, the Russian-themed Cherry Hill Gourmet Market, were radically altering the space. In particular, residents objected when David Isaev, who operated the market, removed lettering from the "Lundy's" sign above the entrance. The city government ordered Isaev to stop renovating the space in late 2008 after finding that the market violated local zoning ordinances, since Lundy's fell within a zoning district that prohibited non-maritime uses. Work resumed after Isaev submitted revised plans for the market, but city inspectors again issued a stop-work order in April 2009, since the market still violated the local zoning ordinance. In total, the city issued 46 stop-work orders for the project; Isaev said of the controversy: "I was in war in Israel and saw nothing like this." The renovation of the market ultimately cost $7 million.

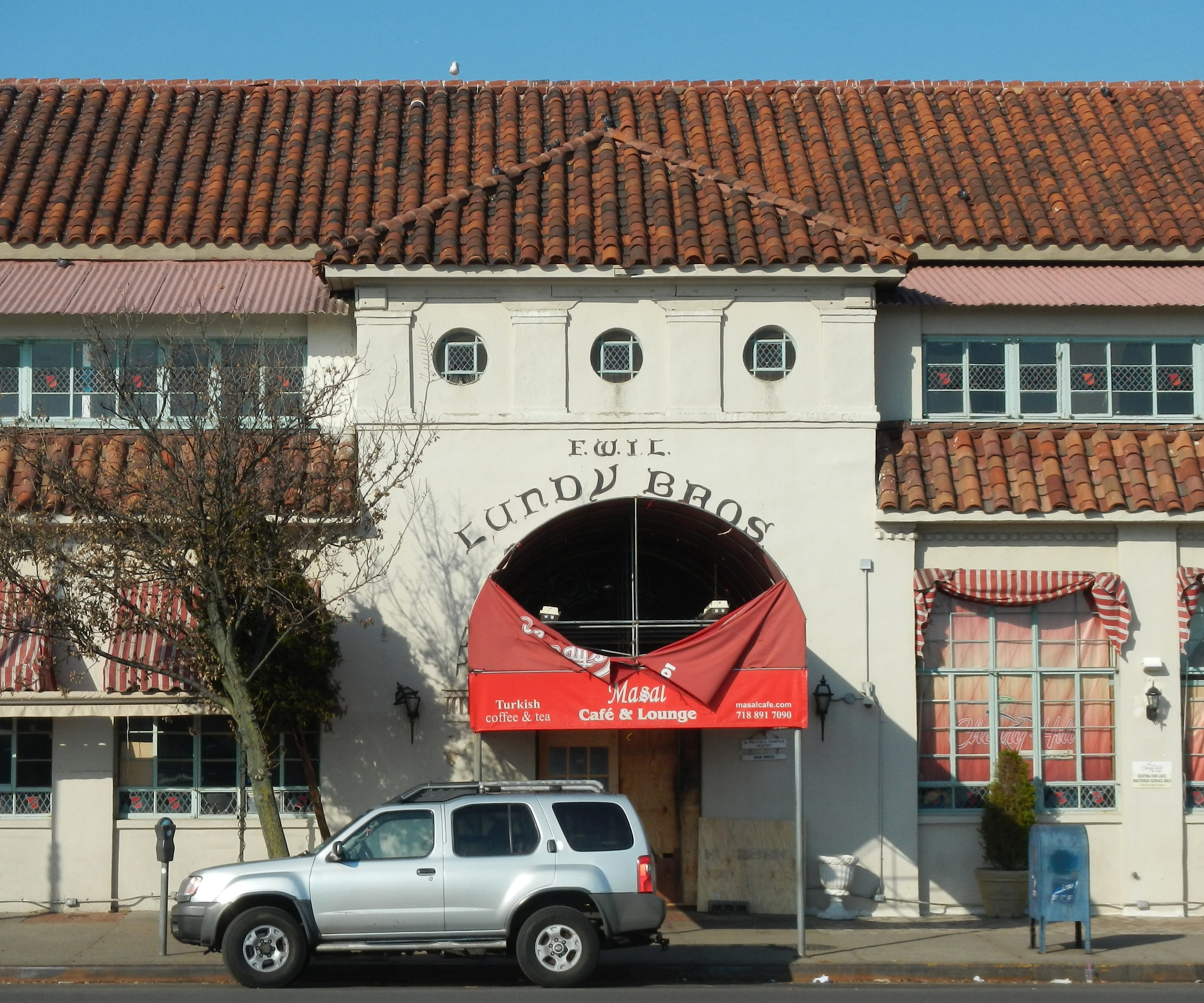
Storm damage from Hurricane Sandy

When Cherry Hill Gourmet Market opened in May 2009, city inspectors promptly fined Isaev for violating zoning ordinances. At the time, the remaining space was occupied by Turkish and Japanese restaurants. Despite the controversies over the renovations, the market was popular, and Crain's New York Business said "the market has helped revive a local landmark". After Isaev agreed to restore the sign above the building's entrance, the LPC waived the zoning-code violations in August 2011. Isaev asked the city to rezone the Lundy's site later the same year. In the aftermath of Hurricane Sandy in October 2012, the waters of Sheepshead Bay overflowed, flooding the building. The front of Masal's Cafe looking out on Sheepshead Bay at Lundy's Landing Shopping Plaza shows the high height of the water level entering the Lundy's structure at the peak of Hurricane Sandy. In 2015, a seafood restaurant named Cipura moved into the western side of the former Lundy's building.

After one of the building's co-owners, Dimitrios Kaloidis, died in 2019, his estate retained 25 percent of the shares in the building, which was valued at $11 million. His brother George Kaloidis, another co-owner, sued Dimitrios's estate in 2021 in an attempt to force the estate to sell the shares. Meanwhile, Frank Cretella transferred the restaurant's naming rights in 2023 to Mark and Sandra Snyder, who announced in 2024 that the restaurant itself would reopen in Red Hook, Brooklyn.

== Architecture ==
The Lundy's restaurant building was designed in the Spanish Colonial Revival style by Bloch & Hesse. The architects had to make the building large enough to be appealing to patrons while also blending in with the seaside-resort and "modern Venice" designs of Sheepshead Bay. The entire city block occupied by Lundy's measured 250 feet (76 m) on its southern side (along Emmons Avenue) and 200 feet (61 m) along its western and eastern sides (along East 19th Street and Ocean Avenue, respectively). The structure has a mostly rectangular footprint, except at its northwestern corner, where it incorporates part of the 2 1/2-story Bayside Hotel on East 19th Street.

Lundy's contained numerous spaces including indoor and outdoor dining, clam and liquor bars, kitchens, storage, a salesmen's waiting room, restrooms, offices, and a staff lounge. The former Bayside Hotel contained the offices, lounge, waiting rooms, and storage, while the one-story wing on Ocean Avenue contained the bars.

=== Main building ===
The primary structure comprising Lundy's is a two-story Spanish Colonial Revival structure, newly built by Bloch & Hesse. Its facade contained large windows that could be opened to let in air; there was no air conditioning at the time of the restaurant's construction, and the windows also provided views of the bay. Specific elements in the Spanish Colonial Revival style included its stucco walls, sloping mission-tiled roofs, an arcade on the second story, a large chimney, tiled gateways, ornate entrance pavilions, and detailing such as wooden lintels and grills at each of the entrances along Emmons Avenue. At the time of the building's construction, the Mediterranean style was commonly used at seaside resorts, so the use of the Spanish Colonial Revival style at Lundy's would have made it seem like a seaside resort.

The southern facade along Emmons Avenue serves as the main facade for the building. Along that side, there is an enclosed second story that is slightly set back from the first story below. The windows on both floors are composed of large casement windows, designed at a time when air-conditioning was nonexistent. The Emmons Avenue facade contains twenty-one bays and two pavilions with hip roofs; the ground-floor bays are separated by pilasters. The entrance bays originally contained wood-and-glass doors with seafood-themed carvings, as well as glass fanlights that contained depictions of seahorses and crabs. Raised lettering with the words f.w.i.l. lundy bros is located above the entrance bays. The other bays contain projecting stone window sills.

The second story has rectangular window openings that are wider and shorter than the corresponding windows on the ground floor, as well as groups of three ocular window openings above each of the entrance pavilions. The rectangular windows are composed of three vertical sections: a decorated center section and transparent top and bottom sections. The second floor's enclosed porches are covered by a red corrugated sheet metal roof. The portion of the second story above the entrance pavilions is also enclosed.

The northern or rear facade contains two sections: a kitchen wing on the western side (adjacent to the Bayside Hotel annex on the northwestern corner of the building), and a dining room wing on the eastern side. The ground floor of the kitchen wing contained the kitchens and included four long, horizontal bays for window openings, while the second floor was an extension of the dining area there, with stucco walls and casement windows. On the dining room wing, there are two pavilions with ocular windows extending from the second floor, between which is an enclosed porch with casement windows.

=== Ancillary structures ===
The Bayside Hotel was incorporated onto the western portion of the building. In 1934 it was redesigned with a stucco facade and Spanish Colonial Revival elements to maintain a continuous design with the new structure. The former hotel is physically separated from the main building by a private alley. At ground level, the western facade of the structure (facing East 19th Street) is composed of four bays with a doorway at the southernmost bay. The second and third levels contain six windows each: two windows that correspond to the southernmost ground-level bay, and four corresponding to the remaining three bays. In the renovation, the hotel structure's original windows were expanded, and on the back facade, an exterior stairway was built to provide access to the second floor. When the original restaurant was in operation, Lundy lived in the old hotel with his significant other, Henry Linker.

The Ocean Avenue side of the restaurant was a separate one-story wing that housed the liquor and clam bars, and was expanded to two stories in 1947. The Ocean Avenue facade has eight bays. Both of the end bays contain entrance pavilions with gable roofs and arched entrances. The six center bays are simpler in design, similar to those on the Emmons Avenue side, though the southernmost of these intermediate bays also contains a doorway. The second story design is similar to that of the second-story porches along Emmons Avenue.

In 1945, the one-story Teresa Brewer Room was erected on the Ocean Avenue side of the building. The room is a one-story log-and-stucco-faced frame structure, with a mosaic war memorial facing Ocean Avenue.

== Cuisine ==
Lundy's menu included several food choices. According to The Village Voice, "Favorite dishes included raw clams on the half shell, small buttered biscuits, tomato salads, corn on the cob, shore dinner, Manhattan clam chowder, and huckleberry pie served with Breyers ice cream." Other popular menu items included lobster, oyster, shrimp, fresh fish, chicken, steak, and ice cream. Many diners reportedly came solely for the small buttered biscuits, which became a staple of Lundy's. Another popular dish was the "shore dinner", a dish that offered shrimp, steamed clams, potatoes, vegetables, a crab or oyster cocktail, halves of a lobster and a chicken, coffee, and dessert, which cost US$5 immediately after World War II (equivalent to $83 in 2025).

The revived version of Lundy's had a contemporary menu, which included both traditional seafood and newer Italian food, meat, and poultry. The new restaurant included a dozen different varieties of lobsters, which were stored in a 1,500-U.S.-gallon (5,700 L) holding tank until just before the guest was about to eat it. Guests were allowed to take the identification tag on the lobster as a souvenir. The Brooklyn-born chef Neil Kleinberg curated the rest of the menu, which included clam chowder, fried shrimp, and three tiers of shore dinners. Under Kleinberg's management, all of the food was baked on the premises, and even included a wood-fired oven for baking pizza.

== Service ==
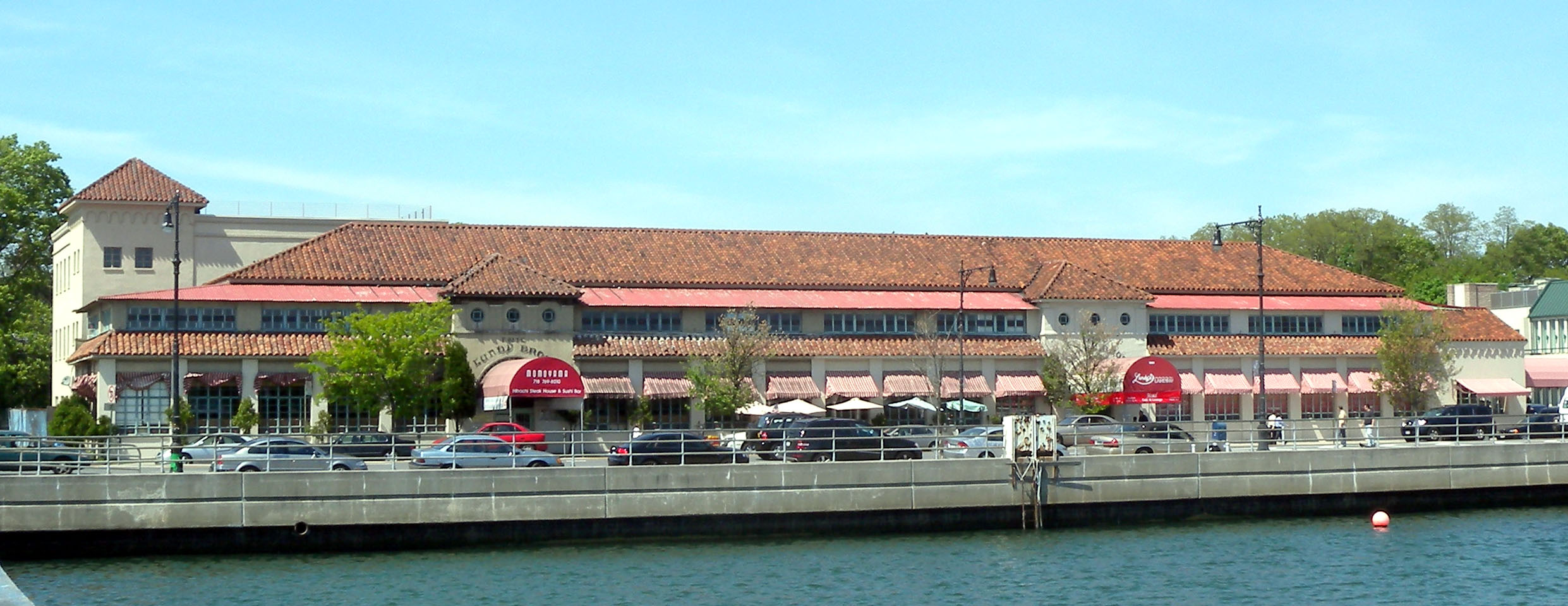
Lundy's as seen from across Sheepshead Bay

Lundy's in its heyday was reported to be one of the largest restaurants in the United States. According to various reports, it seated 2,400, 2,800, or 3,000 patrons. Half of the seats were on the ground floor and the other half were on the second floor. The 1996 version seated 700–800. According to a New York City Landmarks Preservation Commission report, on a regular weekday Lundy's could seat 2,000 patrons, and on a typical Saturday, it could accommodate 10,000 customers. On particularly busy days such as Mother's Day, over 15,000 people could be served at Lundy's. However, the fifth edition of the AIA Guide to New York City states that on busy days, Lundy's only served up to 5,000 meals a day.

Most of the waiters were African-American, due to Irving Lundy's insistence on hiring African Americans to induce a "southern" feeling. This contrasted with the surrounding neighborhoods, which were largely European-American. In the mid-1950s Lundy's employed up to 385 staff, including cooks, bar staff, and waitstaff. Accounts provided by waiters demonstrated a hectic workplace; waitstaff often worked 12-to-14-hour shifts, and Irving Lundy was known to fire staff for the smallest infractions.

Heyday dining at Lundy's was different than from most other restaurants. The restaurant did not provide hosts for seating and reservations were not taken. Arriving diners would spread out throughout the expanse to search for empty or about-to-be-vacated tables, which sometimes resulted in arguments between patrons. Other unusual rituals of Lundy's included the "lobster bibs" which Lundy had invented for diners to wear, and at the end of each meal, diners were given a bowl of water with which to rinse their fingers.

== Reception ==
Food critic Mimi Sheraton wrote that her favorite dishes included the "Huckleberry pie (not blueberry), biscuits and Manhattan clam chowder". Columnist James Brady stated that he remembered "being taken by my father to Lundy's on a Sunday morning after church when he would stand at the clam bar and eat a dozen clams or oysters and I nibbled those little crackers they called Oysterettes." Playwright Wendy Wasserstein said of Mother's Day peak periods in the mid-1950s: "Waiters shoved by with plates piled high with steamers and lobster tails and my brother and I tossed hot biscuits."

Raymond Sokolov of The New York Times wrote in 1971 that the restaurant building was "a stucco colossus". Speaking of the food itself, Sokolov wrote that "the shore dinner only costs $8 and includes soup, plus choice of clam, oyster, shrimp or crabmeat cocktails, steamers, a half broiled lobster and a half broiled chicken, potatoes, vegetables, ice cream or pie and coffee, tea or milk. Every item on that list, except the pies, was a simple but honest success." Author Elliot Willensky described Lundy's in the first edition of the AIA Guide to New York City as being "big, brash, noisy, crowded .... [and] a special treat for anyone in New York." After Irving Lundy died, in 1978 Stan Ginsberg of New York magazine wrote that Lundy's was "the most famous and most popular restaurant on the bay", praising its ambiance with "movie-set Moorish with tables and chairs".

== See also ==
- List of restaurants in New York City
- List of seafood restaurants
- List of New York City Designated Landmarks in Brooklyn
