= Plumb Beach, Brooklyn =

Neighborhood in New York City

Plumb Beach
- Neighborhood of Brooklyn
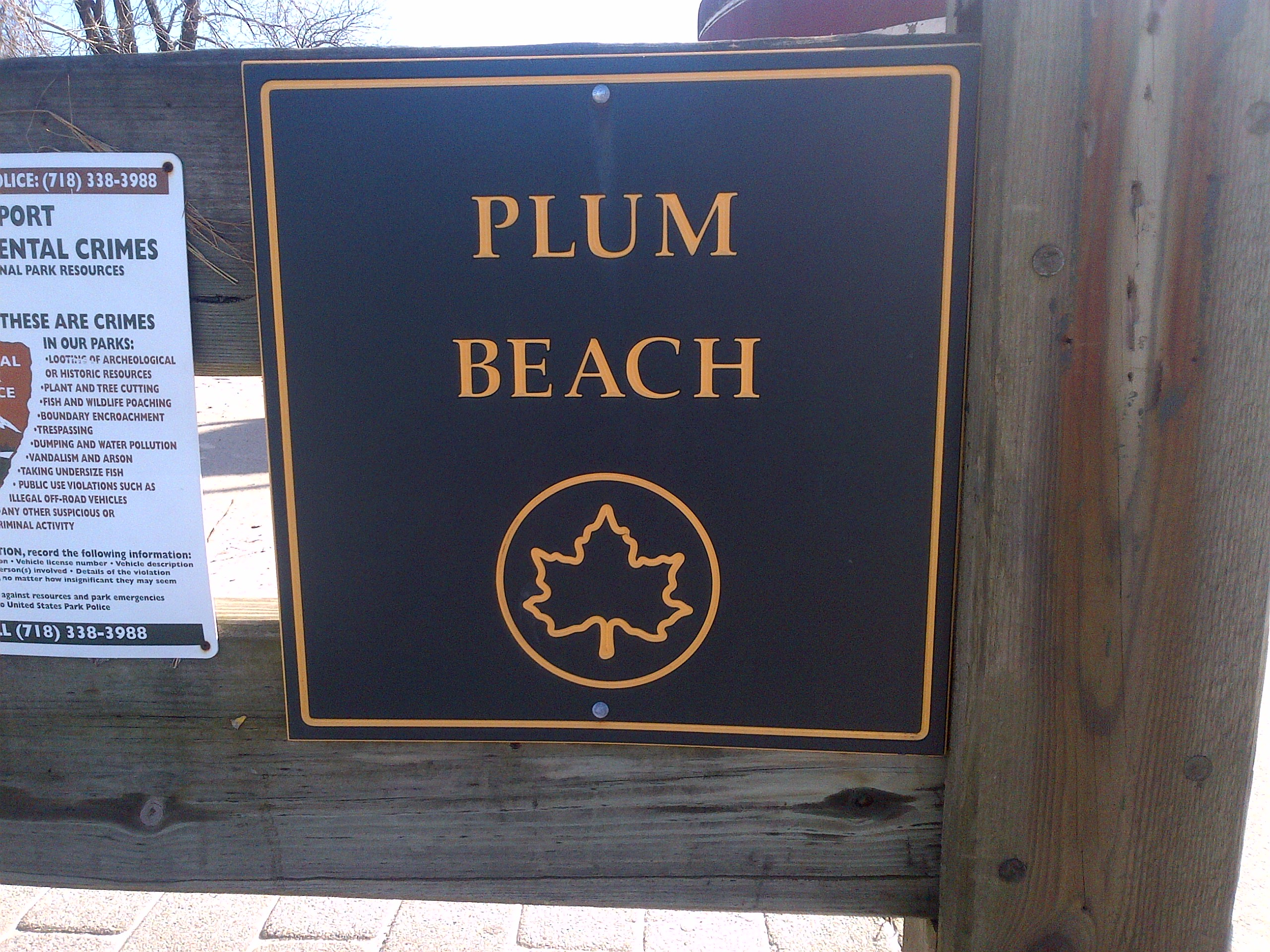
- "Plum Beach" sign in Plumb Beach
- Location in New York City
- Coordinates: 40.584°N 73.921°W
- Country: United States
- State: New York
- City: New York City
- Borough: Brooklyn
- Time zone: UTC– 05:00 (Eastern Time Zone)
- ZIP Code: 11235
- Telephone area code: 718, 347, 929, and 917

Plumb Beach (sometimes spelled "Plum") is a beach and surrounding neighborhood along the north shore of Rockaway Inlet, in the New York City borough of Brooklyn. It is located near the neighborhoods of Sheepshead Bay and Gerritsen Beach, just off the Belt Parkway.

Plumb Beach was originally part of a small island until Hog Creek was filled in during the late 1930s, connecting the beach to the rest of Brooklyn. Since 1972 it has been a part of Gateway National Recreation Area, though the parking lot and greenway that provide primary access to the shore are the responsibility of the New York City Department of Parks and Recreation and the New York City Department of Transportation. The neighborhood is part of Brooklyn Community District 15, although a section of the beach is not part of a Community District.

In May and June, horseshoe crabs climb onto the beach to mate. That beach is often subjected to heavy beach erosion, as incoming storms often blow large amounts of water up the Rockaway Inlet past the beach into Jamaica Bay. In the summer, the beach attracts kiteboarding enthusiasts, as the southerly sea breeze makes the area ideal for this use.

== Early settlements ==
Sailors stopped by the island as early as the 1800s, perhaps snacking on the beach plums that gave the island its name. By 1900, there was sufficient demand for Reid's Ferry, which made stops at Sheepshead Bay, Plumb Beach, Barren Island, and Breezy Point, among others.

George Ayen opened a hotel in 1907, but by World War I, most of the inhabitants of Plumb Island were squatters. This would continue until the 1938 New England hurricane, nicknamed the "Long Island Express", which destroyed most of the shanties, with the remaining squatters forced to leave when construction began on the Belt Parkway. Hog Creek was filled in for this purpose, connecting Plumb Island to the mainland.

== U.S. Army ==
In the 1890s, the federal government intended to build a mortar battery on the eastern end of the island, purchasing one third of Plumb Island's 150 acres. But "Reservation Beach" was unsuitable to the task due to the quicksand-like soil, so squatters moved in, selling liquor and cigars free of any excise tax. To recoup the government's investment, in May 1907 Secretary of War William Howard Taft entered into an agreement with former Judge Winfield S. Overton to lease the property for five years. Overton, soon known as "the czar of Plumb Island", set up his own private police force to protect his domain. To deal with the squatters who refused to pay him rent, he convinced two Army companies from Fort Hamilton to perform the evictions, as it was federal land.

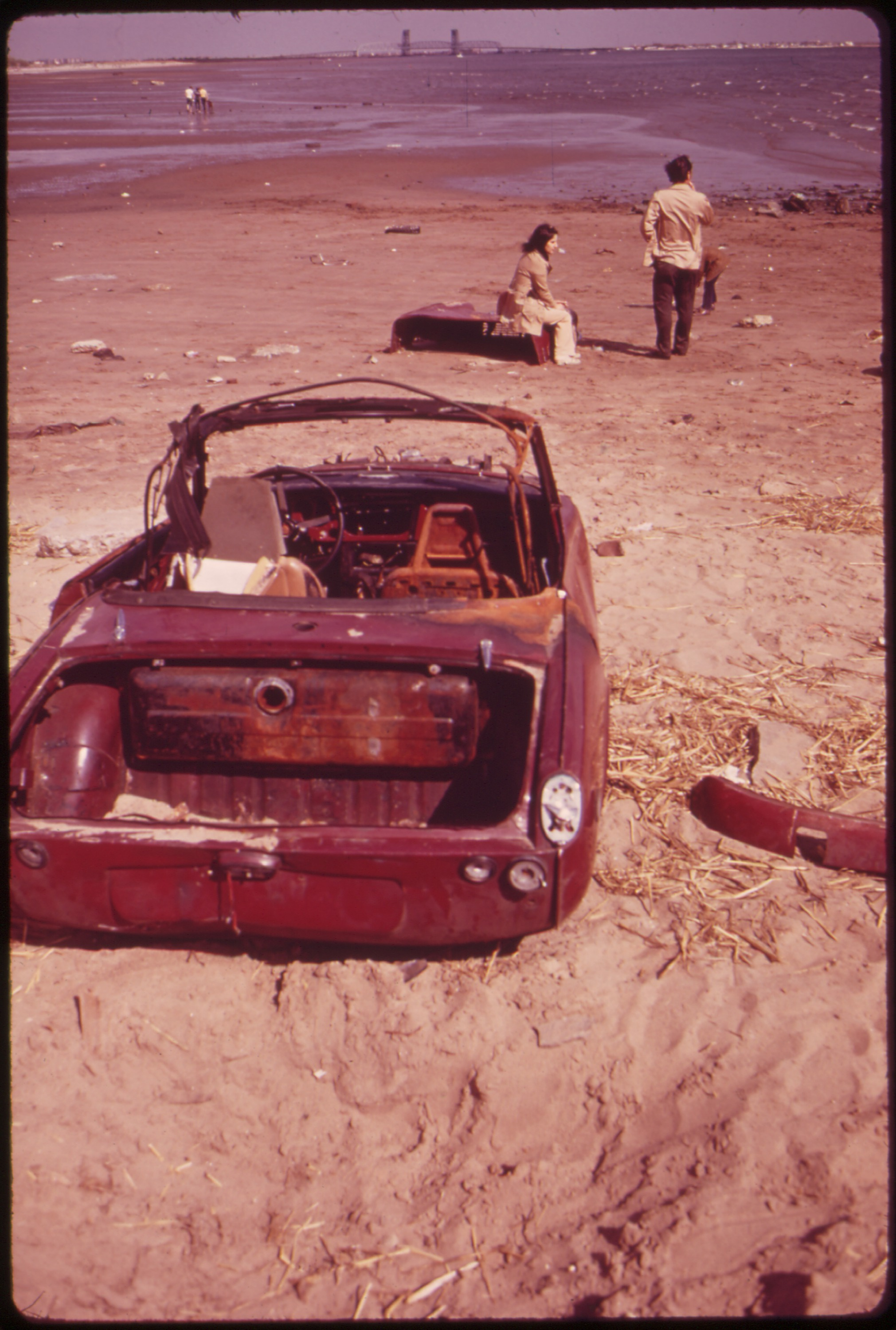
Plumb Beach in 1973

Overton reasoned that state laws did not apply. He announced a "carnival" complete with boxing matches, an illegal activity in New York State. On August 15, 1908, around 200 members of the recently formed "United States Military Athletic and Sporting Club" took in the three-card afternoon as the Sheepshead Bay precinct of the NYPD looked on helplessly. When Overton repeated the feat one week later, the crowd more than doubled in size.

In January 1909, the Department of War responded by revoking Overton's lease, and kicked him off the island; in his place was installed a new "mayor", Frank Dotzler, who would also treat the land as his own private fiefdom. When word came in May that Overton was returning, the 12th Infantry was sent to keep him out – the second "invasion" of Plumb Island in as many years.

== Later years ==
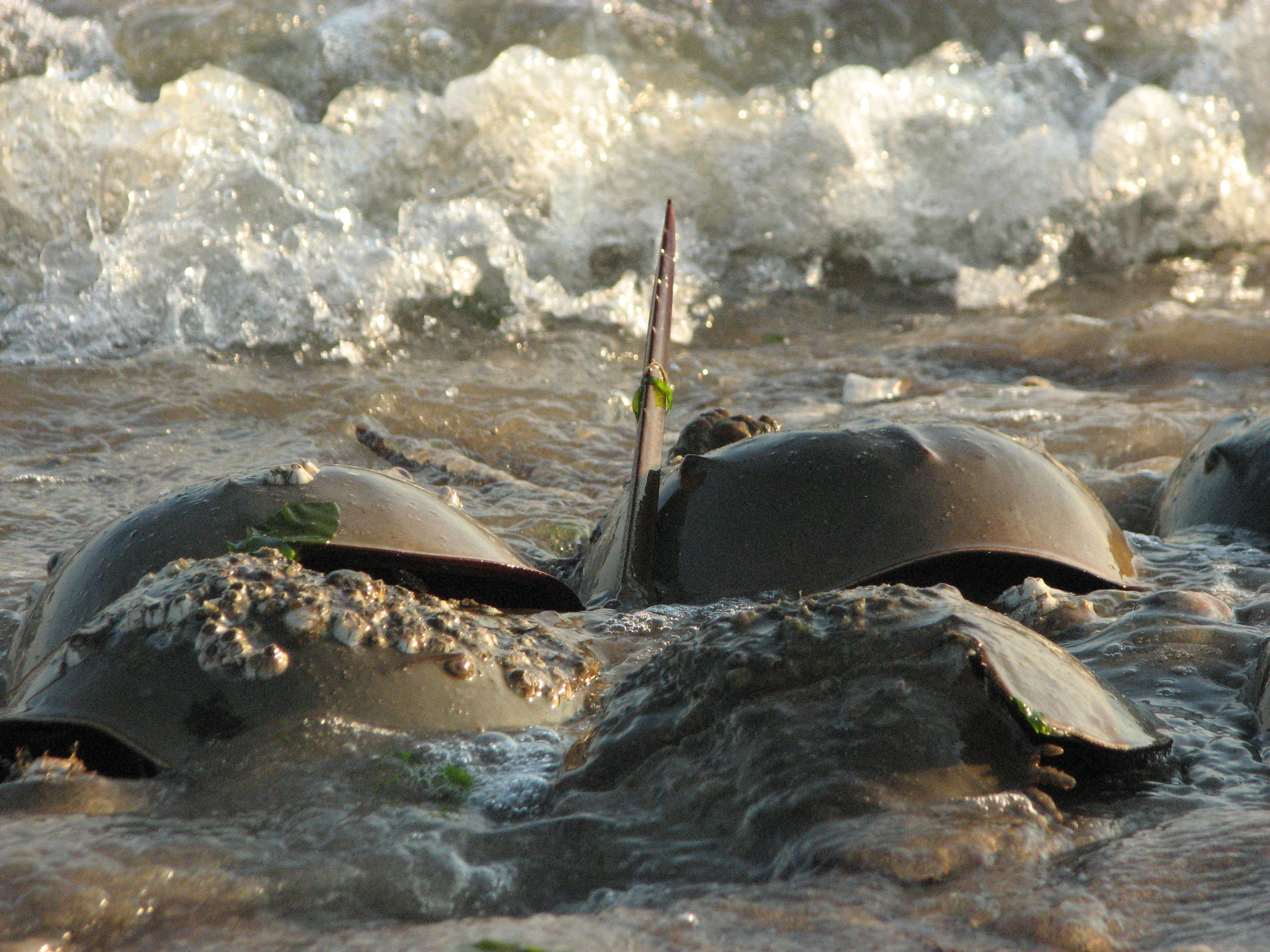
Horseshoe crabs on the shore of Plumb Beach in June 2017

New York City acquired the federal property for park purposes in 1924, but leased it to a contracting company, which parceled and rented the land. The National Park Service acquired Plumb Beach in 1972, and added it to the Gateway National Recreation Area.

It has had a reputation as a lover's lane and as a cruising location.
