= Brooklyn Community Board 15 =

Brooklyn Community District 15
- Community District
- Country: United States
- State: New York
- City: New York City
- Borough: Brooklyn
- Neighborhoods: List: East Gravesend; Gerritsen Beach; Homecrest; Madison; Manhattan Beach; Plum Beach; Sheepshead Bay

Government
  - Chairperson: Theresa Scavo
  - District Manager: Laura Singer

Area
  - Total: 4.7 sq mi (12 km^{2})

Population (2010)
  - Total: 159,650
  - Density: 34,000/sq mi (13,000/km^{2})

Ethnicity
  - African-American: 3.9%
  - Asian: 17.2%
  - Hispanic and Latino Americans: 10.0%
  - White: 66.8%
  - Others: 2.0%
- Time zone: UTC−5 (Eastern)
  - Summer (DST): UTC−4 (EDT)
- ZIP codes: 11223, 11229 and 11235
- Area code: 718, 347, 929, and 917
- Police Precincts: 61st (website)
- Website: www1.nyc.gov/site/brooklyncb15/index.page

Brooklyn Community Board 15 is a New York City community board that encompasses the Brooklyn neighborhoods of Gravesend, Sheepshead Bay, Manhattan Beach, Gerritsen Beach, Madison, Homecrest, and Plum Beach. It is delimited by Corbin Place, Coney Island Avenue, Avenue Y, 86th street, Avenue U and McDonald Avenue, Avenue P and Kings Highway on the north, Nostrand avenue and Marine Park on the east, as well as by the Atlantic Ocean on the south.

Its current chairman is Theresa Scavo. As of the United States Census, 2000, the Community Board has a population of 160,319, up from 143,477 in 1990 and 149,570 in 1980. Of them (as of 2000), 121,052 (75.5%) are White non Hispanic, 4,823 (3.0%) are African-American, 20,229 (12.6%) Asian or Pacific Islander, 123 (0.1%) American Indian or Native Alaskan, 340 (0.2%) of some other race, 3,506 (2.2%) of two or more race, 10,246 (6.4%) of Hispanic origins. 26.6% of the population benefit from public assistance as of 2004, up from 16.1% in 2000. The land area is 3,166.9 acres (12.816 km^{2}).
