= Gail Reed-Barnett =

American counselor & advocate (born 1955)

- Born: Gail Reed; May 28, 1955 (age 70); Bedford–Stuyvesant, Brooklyn, New York City, New York U.S.
- Occupations: School counselor Community advocate
- Years active: 1996-present

Gail A. Reed-Barnett (born May 28, 1955) is a career school counselor and former Brooklyn elected official.

== Early life and education ==
Reed-Barnett was born in the Bedford-Stuyvesant neighborhood of Brooklyn, New York, to parents William and Lillian Reed. She eventually moved and permanently relocated to the East Flatbush neighborhood of Brooklyn.

Reed-Barnett holds a B.A. in Psychology from Medgar Evers College, an MSEd from Long Island University in counseling and an Ed.D in Child, Youth and Family Studies from Nova Southeastern University.

== Career ==
Since 1996, Reed-Barnett has been a School Counselor/College Advisor at the New York City Department of Education.

From 2002 to 2006, she was New York State Committeewoman/District Leader for the 58th Assembly District.

From 2004 to 2006, Reed-Barnett was district leader of Brooklyn Community Board 17. From 2013 to 2015, she was and Chairperson of Brooklyn Community Board 17.

== Leadership ==
- Alumni Association of Medgar Evers College, Secretary and Second Vice President
- East 38th Street 2001 Block Association, President
- New York State School Counselor Association, Governor and Executive Board member
- Nova Southeastern University Alumni Association, Brooklyn Chapter, President

== Honors ==
In 2007, Reed-Barnett was honored by New York State Senator Edolphus Towns for her work in education and within the community.

In 2015, Reed-Barnett won a "Women of Distinction" award from the New York State Senate.

== Personal life ==
Reed-Barnett lives in the East Flatbush neighborhood of Brooklyn. She is married to her husband, Winston Barnett, who is a math teacher.
