= Nostrand Avenue =

Avenue in Brooklyn, New York

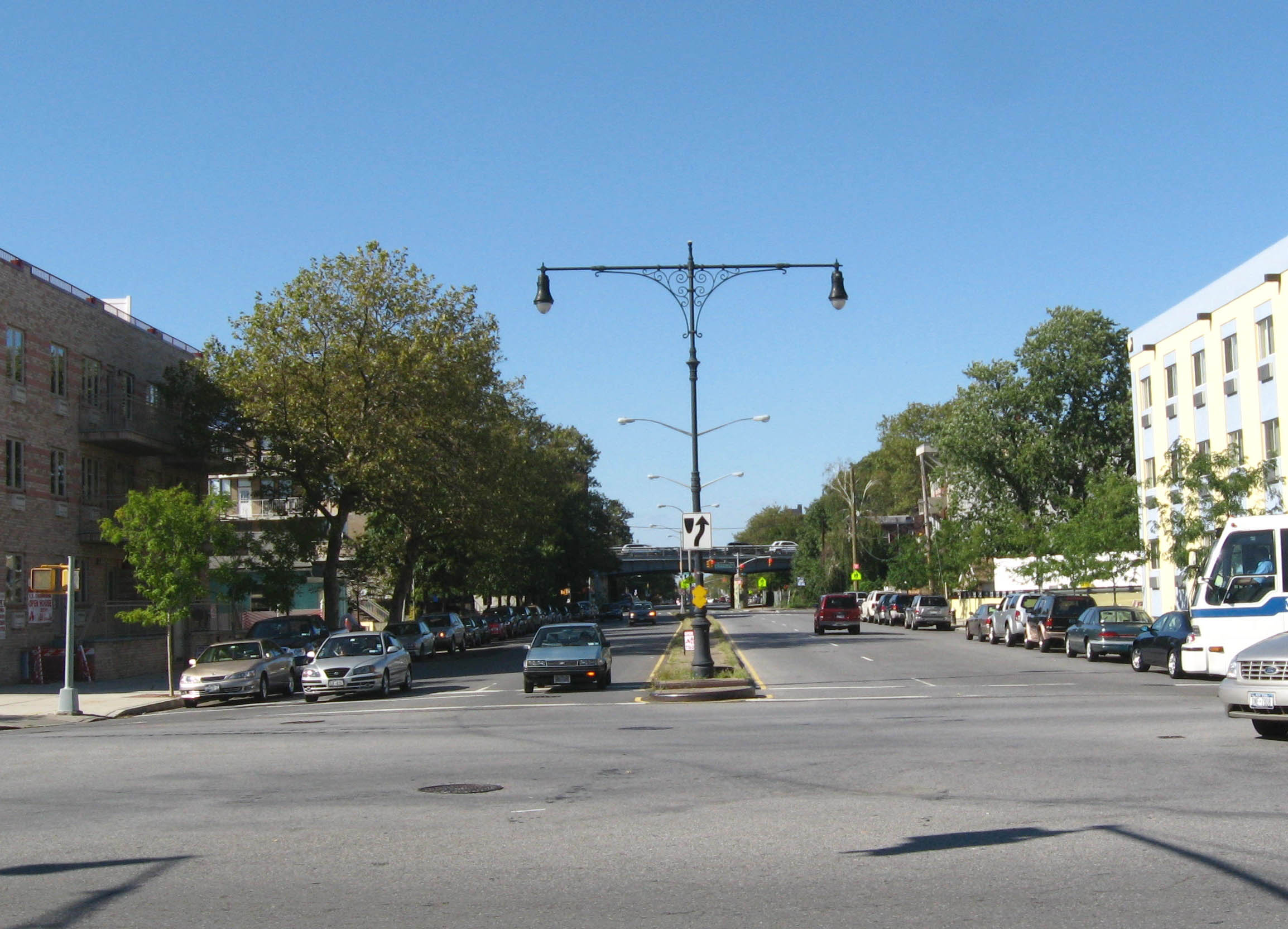
- South end in Sheepshead Bay

- Location within New York City
- Namesake: Dutch settler Gerret Noorstrandt
- Length: 8 miles (13 km)
- Location: Brooklyn, New York City, U.S.
- North end: Flushing Avenue in Williamsburg
- South end: Emmons Avenue in Sheepshead Bay

Nostrand Avenue (/ˈnoʊstrənd/) is a major street in Brooklyn, New York, that runs for 8 miles (13 km) north from Emmons Avenue in Sheepshead Bay to Flushing Avenue in Williamsburg, where it continues as Lee Avenue. It occupies the position of East 30th Street in the Brooklyn street grid. The street is named after the 17th century Dutch settler Gerret Noorstrandt.

== Description ==
From Flushing Avenue to Farragut Road, Nostrand Avenue is a one-way two-lane street going southbound only. Between Farragut Road and Kings Highway, it is a two way street with two traffic lanes. Between Kings Highway and Avenue X, it is a two-way street with four traffic lanes. South of Avenue X, the avenue is a very wide two-way divided road with six traffic lanes. The avenue, originally called Nostrand Lane, has been open since 1840.

In 2004, the 200th anniversary of Haiti's independence, Nostrand Avenue was co-named Toussaint Louverture Boulevard in honor of the Haitian revolutionary Toussaint Louverture (1743–1803).

== Public transportation ==
The street is serviced by the following bus routes:

- The B44 local and B44 SBS buses, which replaced a streetcar line in 1951, serves the entire avenue. Southbound service heads east on Shore Parkway. Where Nostrand is one-way southbound, northbound buses head east via Farragut Road to New York Avenue (local), or northwest on Flatbush Avenue to Rogers Avenue (SBS).
- The B36 runs on the avenue from Avenue Z and Gravesend Neck Road, where it terminates.
- The BM4 express bus runs between Avenue K and Gerritsen Avenue.
- The Bay Ridge-bound B8 runs for one block between Avenue D and Foster Avenue, near the Newkirk Avenue–Little Haiti station.
- The Ridgewood-bound B26 runs from Putnam Avenue to Halsey Street.

Several New York City Subway stations are located on the avenue:

- The IRT Nostrand Avenue Line, served by the 2 and 5 trains, runs under Nostrand Avenue from President Street to Avenue H.
- The IRT Eastern Parkway Line has one local station (3 train) at Eastern Parkway.
- The IND Fulton Street Line has one express station (A and C trains) at Fulton Street.
- The IND Crosstown Line has one station (G train) at Lafayette Avenue.

In addition, the Long Island Rail Road's Atlantic Branch has one station at Atlantic Avenue.
