= Gerritsen Beach, Brooklyn =

Neighborhood in New York City

Coordinates: 40°35′29″N 73°55′36″W

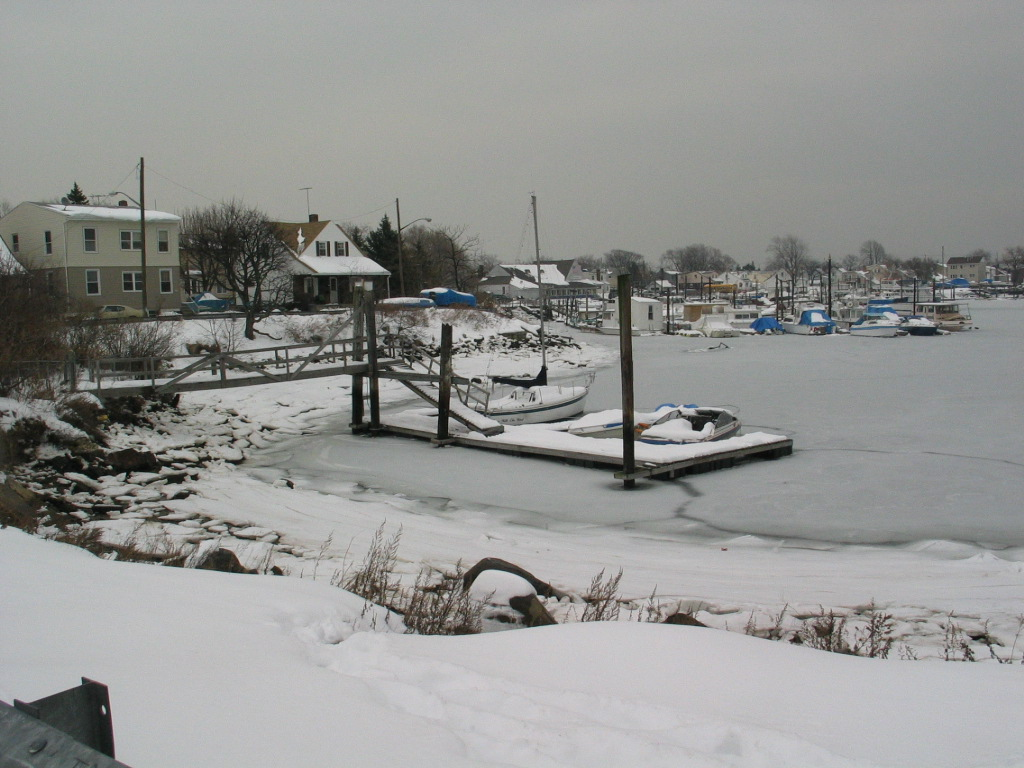
The Plumb Beach Channel in Gerritsen Beach

Gerritsen Beach is a neighborhood in the New York City borough of Brooklyn, located between Sheepshead Bay to the west and Marine Park to the east. The area is served by Brooklyn Community Board 15. The population of the neighborhood is 4,797 as of the 2020 U.S. census.

== History ==
Location in New York City

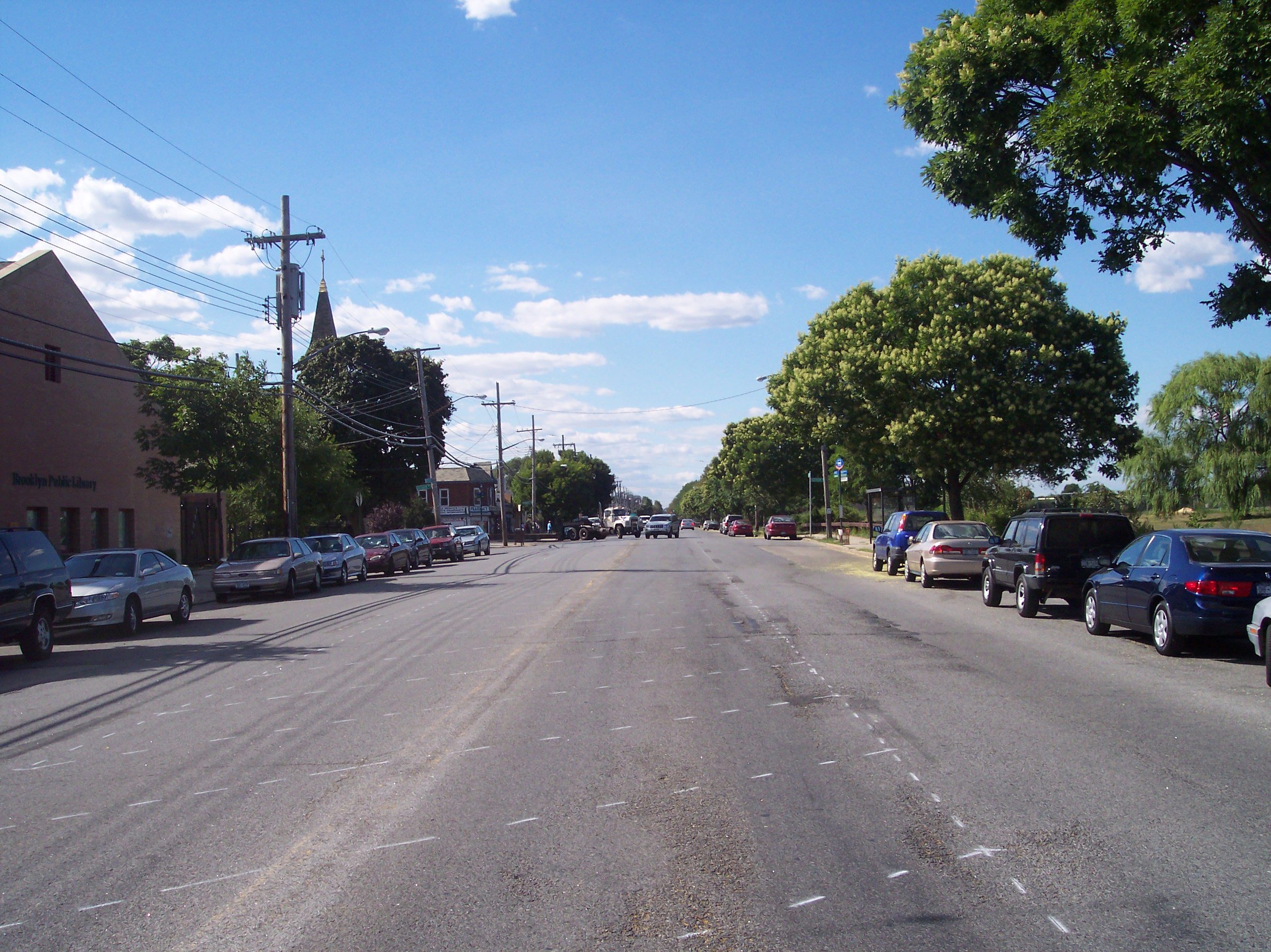
Gerritsen Avenue without bike lanes

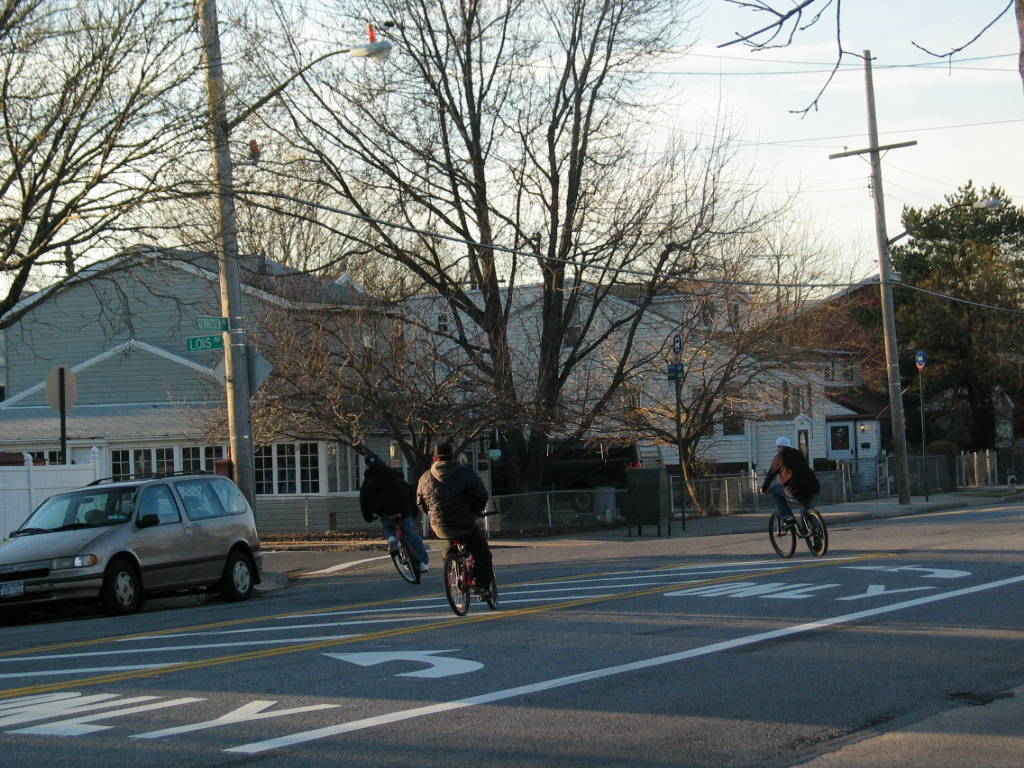
Cyclists on Gerritsen Avenue

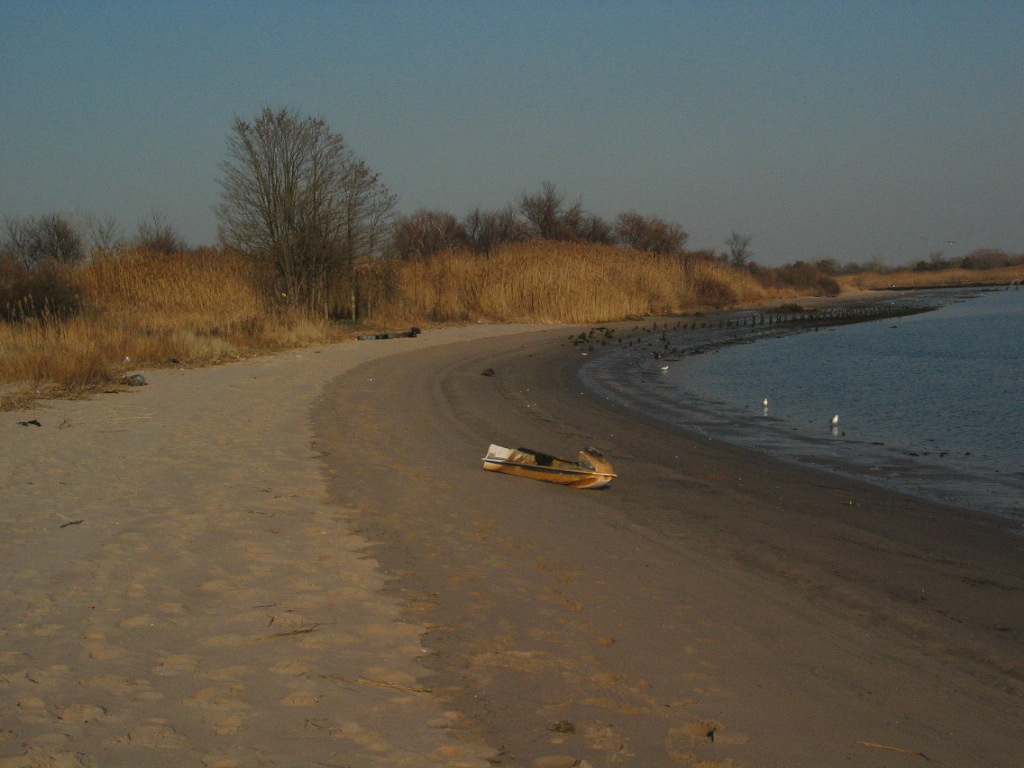
The beach just past the end of Gerritsen Avenue, called "The Point" by local residents

The neighborhood is named for Wolphert Gerretse, a Dutch settler, who, in the early seventeenth century, built a house and mill on Gerritsen Creek, which is now part of the nearby Marine Park neighborhood. The three-hundred-year-old mill was destroyed by fire in 1931. The famous Whitney family owned property by the mill and built a mansion. The Mansion had horse stables, servant quarters, a carriage house, and a private race track. The Mansion was knocked down in 1936 for the Marine Park Building Developments but the carriage house was still left standing. The Carriage house was converted into a private home that is still standing today.

Until the early twentieth century, the area remained undeveloped except for a few squatters’ bungalows clustered at the foot of Gerritsen Avenue. In 1920, Realty Associates, a speculative real-estate builder, began constructing a middle-class summer resort there. The southwestern section of Gerritsen’s meadow was soon covered to one-story bungalows with peaked roofs and no backyards. The popularity of this venture spurred further growth. Some bungalow-owners made them suitable for year-round habitation; others built two-story houses with backyards; and, within a decade, there were fifteen hundred houses in Gerritsen Beach. After WWII, there were apartments for returning veterans and their families. They were located on the opposite side of Gerritsen Avenue in what is now park land. They were demolished around 1955 after all the residents had relocated.

Almost all homes in the Gerritsen Beach area were damaged and/or affected by seawater on October 29, 2012, from Hurricane Sandy due to its peninsula characteristics. Almost all of the residents did not leave the neighborhood before the flooding began. The flood waters reached a record 10–12 ft in some parts of the neighborhood. A bar from Deep Creek Marina, two miles away, floated into the neighborhood, with bottles and seating intact. The damage was so severe that it led Mayor Michael Bloomberg to reclassify Gerritsen Beach as being in a Zone A flood zone.

== Geography ==
Gerritsen Beach lies on a peninsula in the southeastern part of Brooklyn, south of the neighborhood of Marine Park and west of the eponymous park. It is bounded on the north by Midwood at Avenue U, to the east by Marine Park at Gerritsen Avenue, to the south by Plumb Beach and the Plumb Beach Channel, and to the west by Sheepshead Bay at Shell Bank Creek and Knapp Street.

It is bisected, from west to east, by the Gotham Avenue Canal. The area north of the canal, known as the "new section" by local residents, has traditional city streets lined with stores, brick houses, and wide sidewalks. The area south of the canal (the "old section") is a popular spot for party and chartered fishing boat berths. The typical size of the land lots in the community are 40 by 45 feet (12.19 by 13.72 m) in the old section, 34 by 52 feet (10.36 by 15.85 m) in the new section, and 24 by 70 feet (7.32 by 21.34 m) on the waterfront. The streets in Gerritsen Beach are in alphabetical order (that is, Aster, Bevy, Celeste, Dictum, etc.).

== Community ==
The neighborhood has a large Irish-Catholic presence in the community. A few long-standing residents of Irish descent refer to the community as being cois fharraige, which is an Irish language phrase meaning "by the sea". The remaining percentage of the population is predominantly of Scandinavian, Italian and German descent.

== Education ==
The neighborhood is the location of the New York City Department of Education's Public School 277, an elementary school known as the Gerritsen Beach School. Comedian Chris Rock attended the school.

Brooklyn Blue-Feather School, at 2335 Gerritsen Avenue, is for special needs children.

The Brooklyn Public Library's Gerritsen Beach branch is located at 2808 Gerritsen Avenue. The library has been operating since the 1950s, though it moved to its current location, a 10,000-square-foot (930 m^{2}) structure, in 1997.

== Recreation ==
The Gerritsen Ballfields, consisting of three baseball fields, two athletic fields for soccer or football, and one Little League field, are located on the east side of Gerritsen Avenue, in addition to a "mini-airport" for motorized model airplanes located at Seba Avenue and Gerritsen Avenue. In 1993, this site benefited from a $192,000 renovation sponsored by Borough Council Member Herbert E. Berman. Also, recreational fishing is very popular with citizens of the community, as anglers are found fishing along the shore at the southern end of Gerritsen Avenue and along the adjacent shoreline of the Gerritsen Creek-Marine Park "salt marsh". The Gerritsen Creek estuary and the adjacent salt marsh is also a major spawning ground for various species of marine fish. Although riding quads is popular at this park, the activity is illegal everywhere in New York City and is destructive to the park's fragile ecosystem.

== Police and crime ==
Gerritsen Beach is patrolled by the 61st Precinct of the NYPD, located at 2575 Coney Island Avenue. The 61st Precinct ranked 5th safest out of 69 patrol areas for per-capita crime in 2010.

The 61st Precinct has a lower crime rate than in the 1990s, with crimes across all categories having decreased by 88.2% between 1990 and 2018. The precinct reported 1 murder, 17 rapes, 150 robberies, 170 felony assaults, 169 burglaries, 584 grand larcenies, and 72 grand larcenies auto in 2018.

== Fire safety ==
=== New York City Fire Department ===
Gerritsen Beach is served by the New York City Fire Department (FDNY)'s Engine Co. 321/Foam 321/Brush Fire Unit 6, located at 2165 Gerritsen Avenue.

=== Volunteer Fire Department ===
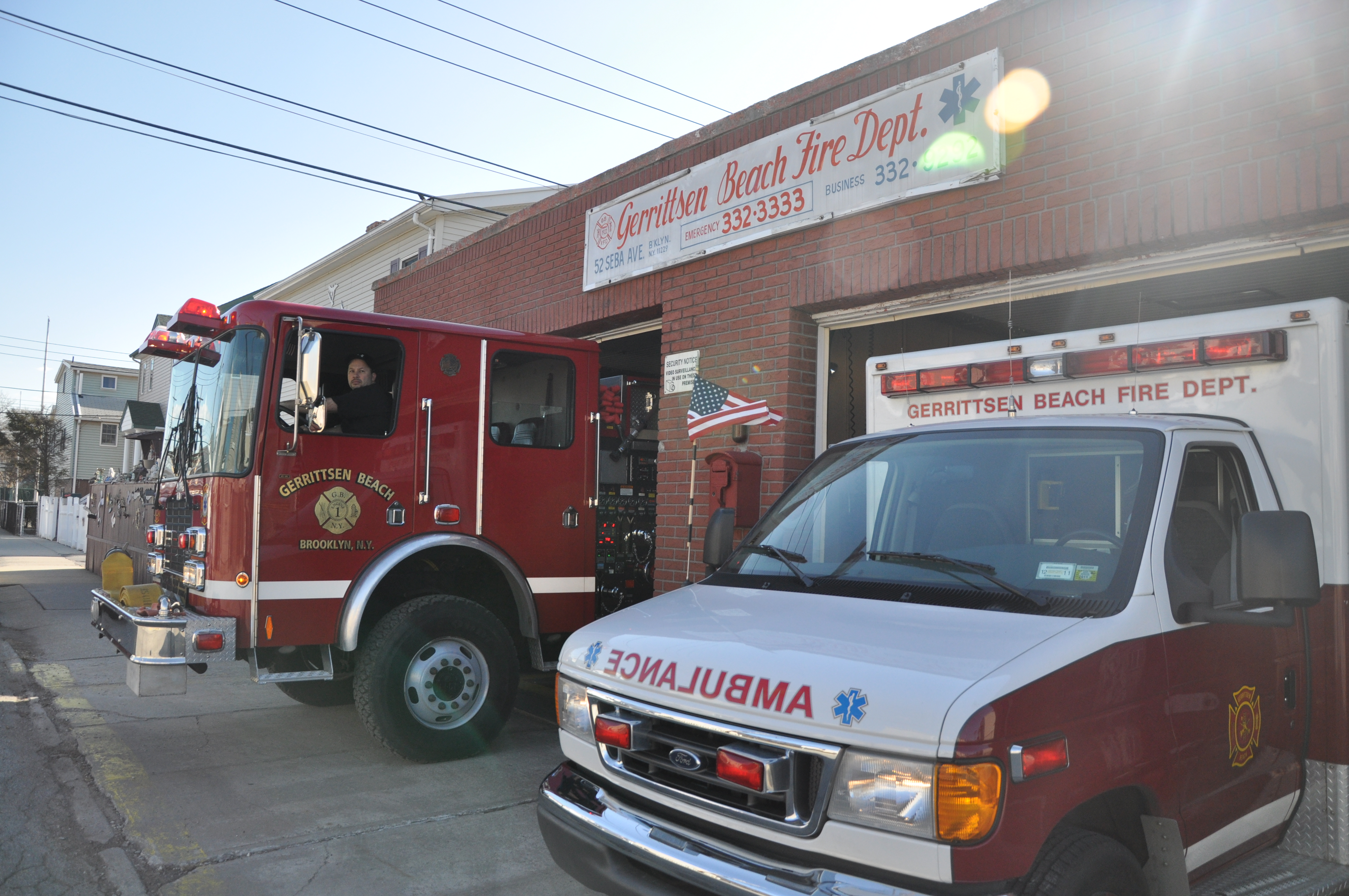
Gerrittsen Beach Fire Department Vehicles

The local Volunteer Fire Department (a.k.a. "the Vollies"), the last remaining volunteer fire department in Brooklyn, was organized in 1922 when Gerritsen Beach was a small summer-resort community. The name of the department is officially spelled Gerrittsen Beach Fire Department [sic]. In 1921, a damaging fire on Abbey Court demonstrated to the community that the city’s regular fire apparatus could not reach the beach in time to put out a fire. A mass meeting was called by the residents, and that resulted in the organization of the only volunteer fire department in Brooklyn.

Before the city added water mains under Gerritsen Beach streets, the Volunteers had to handle fires at least three times a week. The danger posed to Gerritsen Beach residents by fire was especially acute because most families relied on oil stoves and kerosene lamps, and the water to fight fires had to be pumped from wells. The city did not build Engine Company 321's firehouse at Gerritsen Avenue and Avenue U until October 4, 1930.

Members of the fire brigade, currently known as the Vollies, were, in earlier times, nicknamed "the Vamps". Members are not only trained to fight fires, but also to rescue people who are drowning and to assist in other medical emergencies. According to the Vollies 1976 anniversary booklet, the Vollies were approved by the New York State Department of Health as an Emergency Services Training Center. Although the community is now served by Engine Company 321, strong support for the "Vollies" continues.

The following historical events involved the Gerritsen Beach volunteers in actions outside their own neighborhood:

- The Vollies responded with medical aid to the victims of the jet airliner crash at 7th Avenue and Sterling Place, on December 16, 1960.
- Just three days after the New York air disaster, on December 19, 1960, the Vollies responded to the city’s call for assistance in fighting a blaze aboard the aircraft carrier USS Constellation (CV-64) at the Brooklyn Navy Yard.
- During heavy fog, the powerful beam of the department's Mack searchlight is used at Kennedy Airport when requested.
- When there was a major oil fire in Mill Basin in 1962, the Vollies responded with foam to help put it out.
- On 9/11 The Vollies assisted FDNY Battalion 33 by temporarily relocating their apparatus to the Firehouse of Engine 321 on Gerritsen Avenue and Avenue U when E321 responded to the WTC. Doing so allowed the Vollies to cover the response areas normally covered by E321 such as Marine Park and Sheepshead Bay while continuing to provide service to the residents of Gerritsen Beach.
- During the blizzard of 2010, the department responded rapidly to Gerritsen Beach while the EMS system was heavily delayed.
- During Hurricane Sandy the Gerrittsen Beach Fire Department assisted in evacuating and rescuing residents trapped by flood waters, In the aftermath of Hurricane Sandy the department set up a relief center providing food, shelter, medical resources and agency support to its residents.

The Gerritsen Beach Volunteer Fire Department has one fire engine, two ambulances, one brush fire unit and a fly car.

== In film ==
- Moscow on the Hudson (1984)
- The Departed (2006)
- Shaft (2000)
- She's the One (1996)
- Then She Found Me (2007)

== Notable people ==
- Heather Hardy (born 1982), boxer
- Patty Smyth (born 1957), singer and songwriter, lead singer of rock band Scandal
- Robert Anton Wilson (1932–2007), author, futurist and self-described agnostic mystic.
