= Sheepshead Bay, Brooklyn =

Neighborhood in New York City

Sheepshead Bay
- Neighborhood
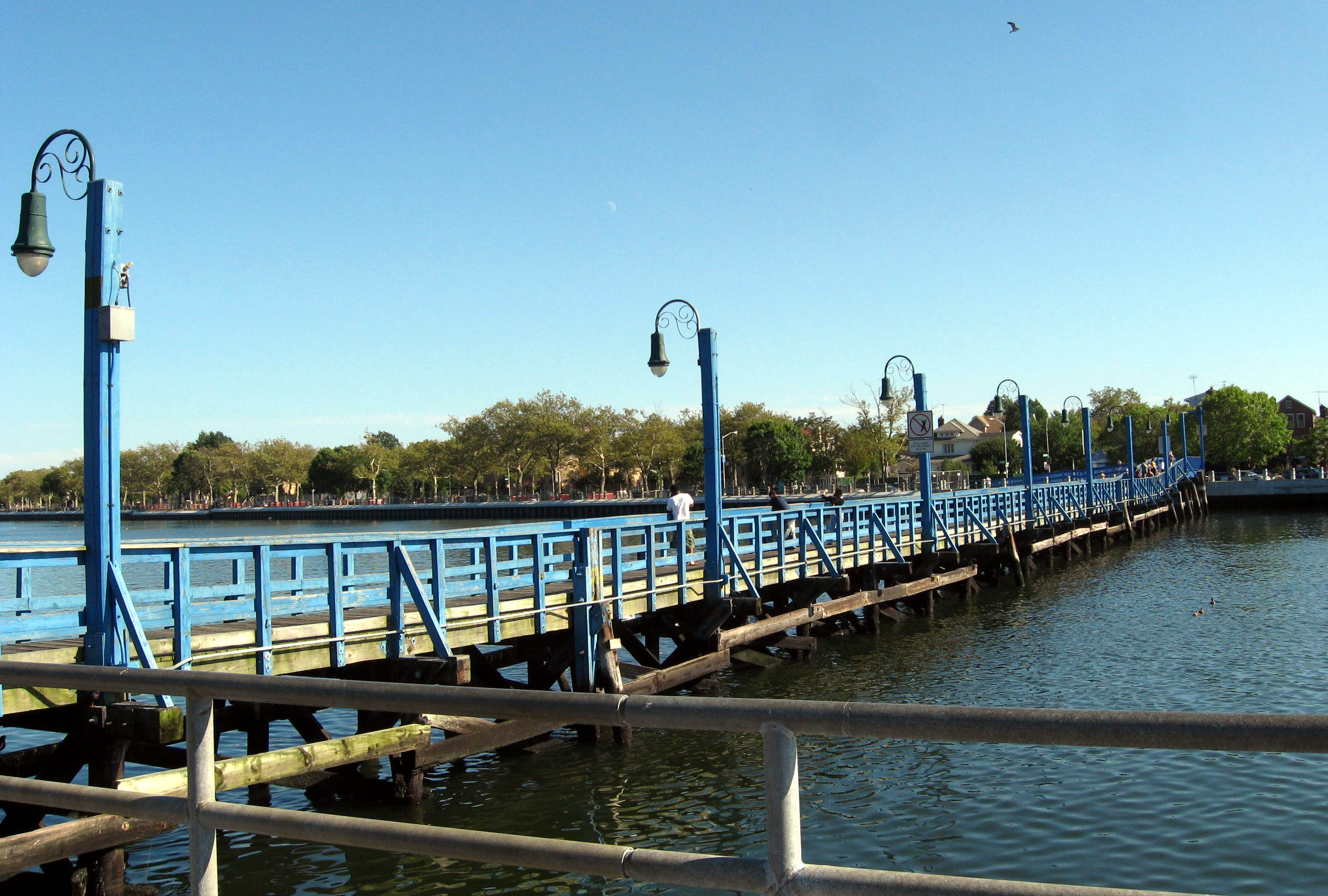
- Ocean Avenue Footbridge
- Location in New York City
- Coordinates: 40.582°N 73.942°W
- Country: United States
- State: New York
- City: New York City
- Borough: Brooklyn
- Community District: Brooklyn 15

Area
  - Total: 2.2800 sq mi (5.9053 km^{2})

Population (2010)
  - Total: 64,518 (103,834 with Madison subsection)
  - Density: 28,297/sq mi (10,925/km^{2})

Ethnicity
  - White: 68.1%
  - Asian: 15.7
  - Hispanic: 8.1
  - Black: 6.4
  - Other: 1.7
- Time zone: UTC−5 (Eastern)
  - Summer (DST): UTC−4 (EDT)
- Postal codes: 11229, 11235
- Area code: 718, 347, 929, and 917

Sheepshead Bay is a neighborhood in southern Brooklyn, New York City. It is bounded by Ocean Parkway to the west; Kings Highway to the north; Nostrand Avenue and Gerritsen Avenue to the east; and the Atlantic Ocean to the south. Sheepshead Bay is abutted by the neighborhoods of Brighton Beach, Manhattan Beach, Coney Island and Homecrest, to the west; Midwood to the north; and Gerritsen Beach to the east.

The neighborhood is named after a bay that separates mainland Brooklyn from the eastern portion of Coney Island & the Southern portion of Manhattan Beach & Brighton Beach which was originally one of the Outer Barrier islands but is now a peninsula. The mouth of the bay is about 1.0 mile (1.6 km) southwest of Marine Park.

Sheepshead Bay is part of Brooklyn Community District 15, and its primary ZIP Codes are 11229 and 11235. It is patrolled by the 61st Precinct of the New York City Police Department. Politically it is represented by the New York City Council's 46th and 48th Districts.

== History ==
=== Fishing and tourism destination ===
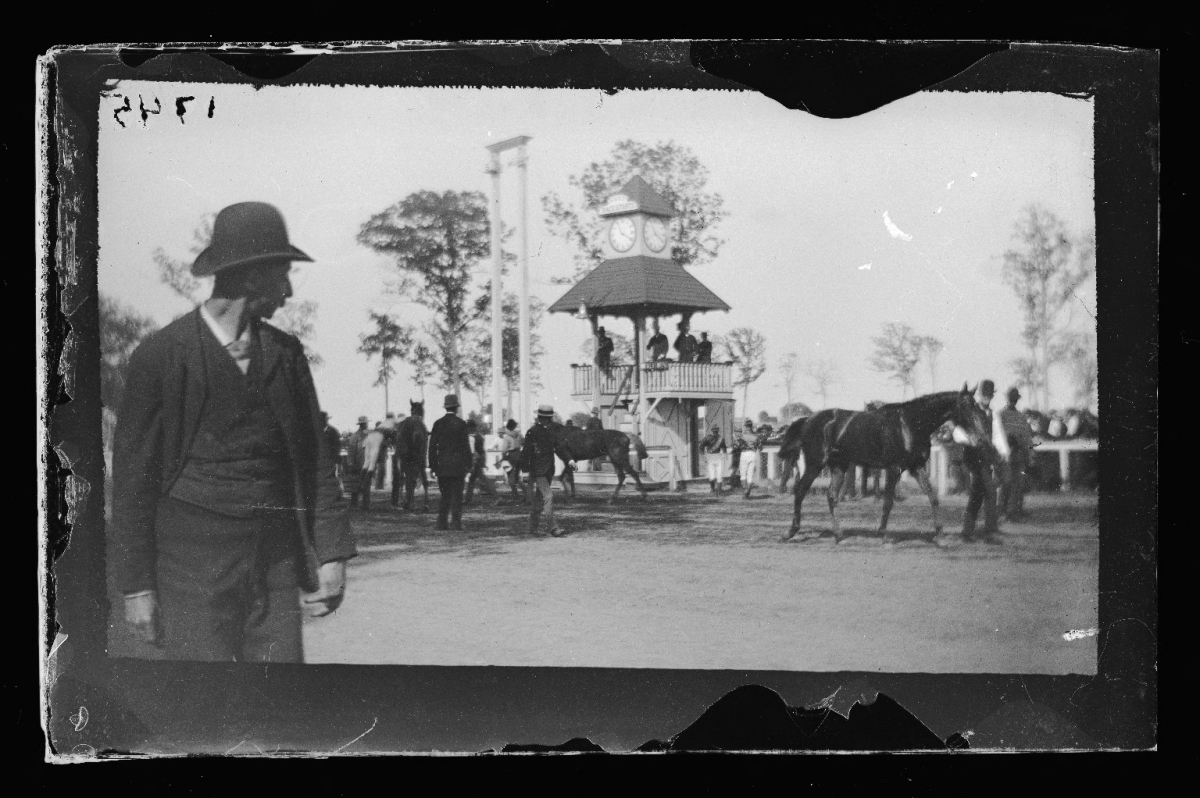
Races, c. 1872–1887

The name "Sheepshead Bay" applies to the neighborhood north of the bay as well as the bay itself. Sheepshead Bay was named for the sheepshead, an edible fish found in the bay's waters. Originally an extension of the town of Gravesend to the west, Sheepshead Bay was a secluded fishing and farming community early in its history.

Starting in the 1840s, residents of Brooklyn and Manhattan were drawn to the community as a summer destination. Hunters and fishermen started coming to Sheepshead Bay and various restaurants and hotels were erected. Sheepshead Bay's allure as a fishing destination was further helped by the opening of Ocean Avenue in 1876 and the extension of the Long Island Rail Road's Manhattan Beach Branch in 1877–1878, which brought visitors both to the community of Sheepshead Bay and to the Manhattan Beach resort across the bay. The first of the community's farms was split up into several lots for residential development in 1877. Three years later the Sheepshead Bay Race Track opened in the neighborhood, bringing even more visitors during the spring and fall. Near the racecourse, racing investor William Collins Whitney constructed a training track. A "Millionaire's Row" was built on Emmons Avenue east of East 27th Street, while socialites tended to go to restaurants such as Tappan's.

The track would continue to operate as a horse-racing course until 1910 when horse betting was criminalized in New York state. Afterward it operated as an auto racing track from 1915 to 1919. The decline of the Sheepshead Bay Race Track, along with the construction of amusement parks at nearby Coney Island and the proximity of Coney Island's attractions to the newly built subway, led to the decline of Sheepshead Bay as a tourist destination. Passenger rail service on the Manhattan Beach Branch ceased in 1924, and the line was formally abandoned in 1937. The former race track site was subdivided for the construction of housing, and Millionaire's Row was soon lined with bungalows. The closure of the race track resulted in a plethora of newly vacant plots in the community of Sheepshead Bay, and by extension, an influx of residents.

=== Filling of creek and waterfront development ===
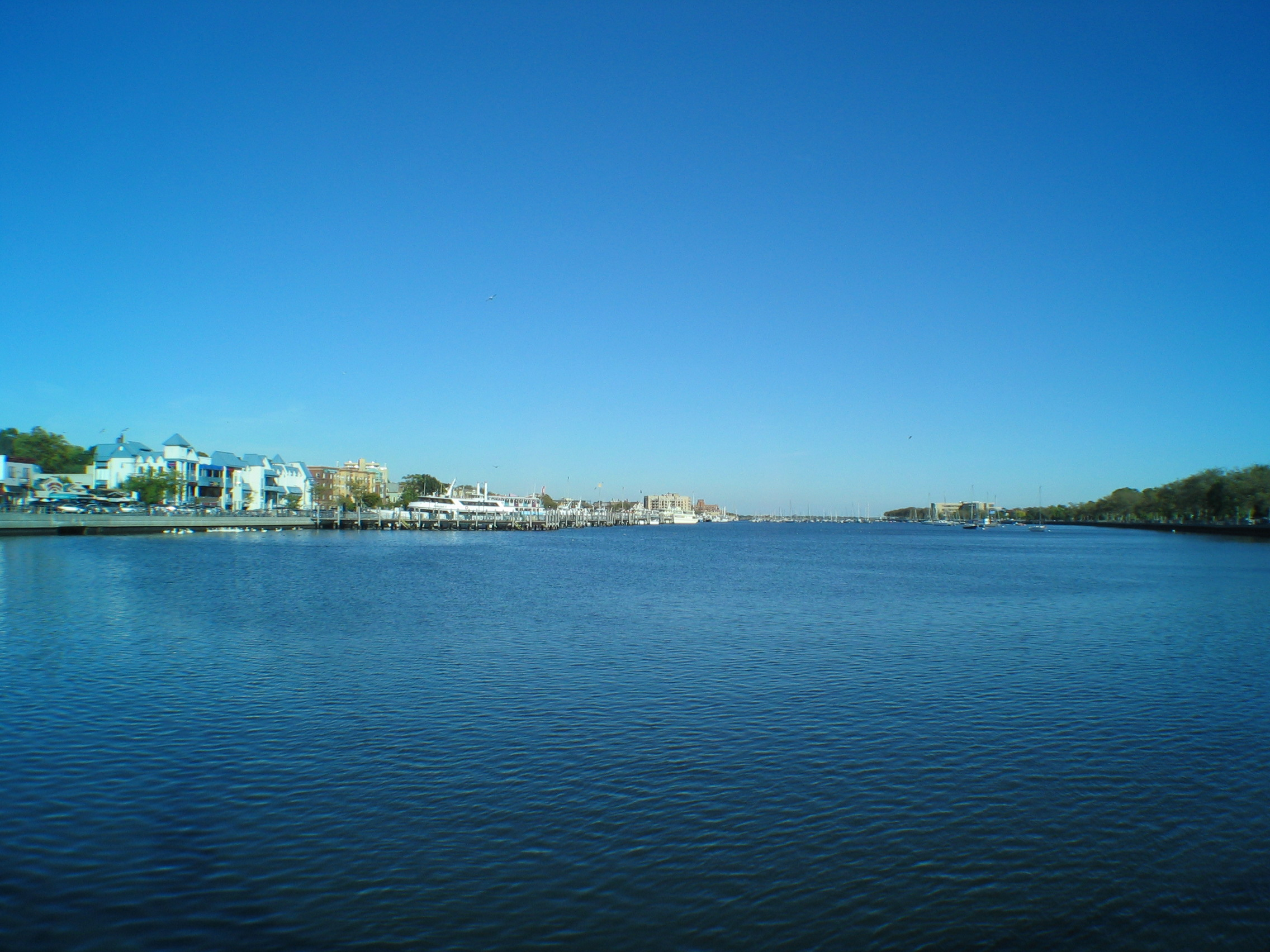
Sheepshead Bay, facing east

The bay itself was originally the easterly entrance to Coney Island Creek, which was 3 miles (4.8 km) long and minimally navigable through the 20th century. A map from 1898 shows that numerous inlets protruded from the bay into the community. From the late 19th century through the early 20th century there were plans to turn the creek into the Gravesend Ship Canal. The plan including re-dredging the creek into a canal running in a straight east–west line and filling all the marsh land either side of the creek to expand the urban grid to the edge of the canal. However, this never happened. Squan Creek, a tributary of the Coney Island Creek, ran through the Sheepshead Bay neighborhood. While Squan Creek was infilled in the 1920s, its route is still evidenced by Sheepshead Bay Road's crooked route through the street grid, as well as the presence of several dead-end streets that used to abut the creek's route.

With the development of the Sheepshead Bay community into a residential neighborhood, there were efforts to improve the facilities on the waterfront. The channel of the Sheepshead Bay waterway was dredged by 1916 to allow fishing boats to dock there; previously these craft had to dock at Canarsie. In 1922 the New York City Dock Commission proposed to dredge the bays further, build bulkheads on the shore, and widen Emmons Avenue on the waterfront from 80 to 120 feet (24 to 37 m). 25 piers would be built on the south side of Emmons Avenue while 26 buildings, including a new Lundy's Restaurant location, would be built on the north side. Residents expressed concerns that the bay might become a commercial shipping port, and local fishermen opposed the city's plan to establish a fish market there. A compromise to use Sheepshead Bay only for private and charter boats was reached in 1929, and the city built several piers at an angle from the bulkhead to prevent trucks from loading onto these piers.

In 1931, the city condemned several buildings on the bay shore, including the original Lundy's Restaurant, to widen Emmons Avenue. The Great Depression delayed further progress, as these buildings would not be destroyed until mid-1934, and construction started on new buildings on Emmons Avenue's northern sidewalk. At that point a newspaper article noted that Emmons Avenue had been "transformed by attractive looking restaurants and stores." In 1936, the city and the owners of the condemned buildings reached a monetary settlement, and by the following year, the channel had been dredged and ten docks had been constructed. The filling-in of the central part of the Coney Island during the 1930s, in conjunction with construction of the Shore Parkway portion of the Belt Parkway. Shore Parkway opened in 1941, and soon afterward, the last remaining farms in Sheepshead Bay were redeveloped into residential buildings.

=== Later development ===
Sheepshead Bay became populated by Jewish and Soviet immigrants during the late 20th century, similar to neighboring Brighton Beach. In 1978, in one of the largest disasters in Sheepshead Bay's modern history, six firefighters were killed while fighting the Waldbaum's supermarket fire. Sheepshead Bay did not undergo the white flight and high crime that afflicted other New York City neighborhoods. Lundy's closed in 1979, resulting in the closure of retail on Emmons Avenue. After the closure of Lundy's, Sheepshead Bay transformed from a predominantly Irish and Italian enclave into a more racially diverse neighborhood, and the population became increasingly elderly. Recreational fishing along the bay also started to decline in the surrounding community. In the 1970s, the city created a maritime zoning district on Emmons Avenue to promote waterfront development. The Sheepshead Bay Roll-A-Palace, a roller disco rink that opened in the neighborhood in 1977, welcomed over 5,000 customers per weekend at its peak.

In the last decade of the 20th century, a real estate boom brought the reopening of Lundy's Restaurant, which was made a city landmark in 1992. Furthermore, Loehmann's proposed a store in Sheepshead Bay in 1993, the first major development in the area in several years, though the city rejected initial plans for the development after community opposition. After another proposal for a Loehmann's shopping center was rejected, Mayor Rudy Giuliani's administration approved a smaller version of the shopping center in the late 1990s. Meanwhile, the reopening of Lundy's in 1995 spurred a wave of development on Emmons Avenue. By March 1996, property owners reported that real estate prices had doubled and that vacant apartments were being occupied. With new development, housing prices in the area increased sharply, and there were concerns about a dearth of parking, since the new developments had collectively resulted in the removal of 2,000 parking spots in Sheepshead Bay. Also in the mid-1990s, a small amusement park called Fun Time USA opened on Knapp Street, operating for almost 11 years before closing in 2005.

Lundy's closed again in 2007; a shopping center took its place. Soviet-style restaurants/nightclubs opened along the waterfront. Sheepshead Bay has also experienced a growth of condominium developments, and on Emmons Avenue, the northern shoreline street along the bay, are piers boasting an active seafood market and tour boats.

== Land use ==
Sheepshead Bay is mostly residential. Low-density, one- and two-family attached and semi-attached houses are common near the western and eastern edges of the neighborhood. Higher-density condominiums and co-ops are more common near Ocean Avenue, at the center of the neighborhood. Housing developments include Sheepshead Bay-Nostrand Houses managed by NYCHA and two Mitchell-Lama Housing Program co-ops, Kings Bay I & Kings Bay II.

== Demographics ==
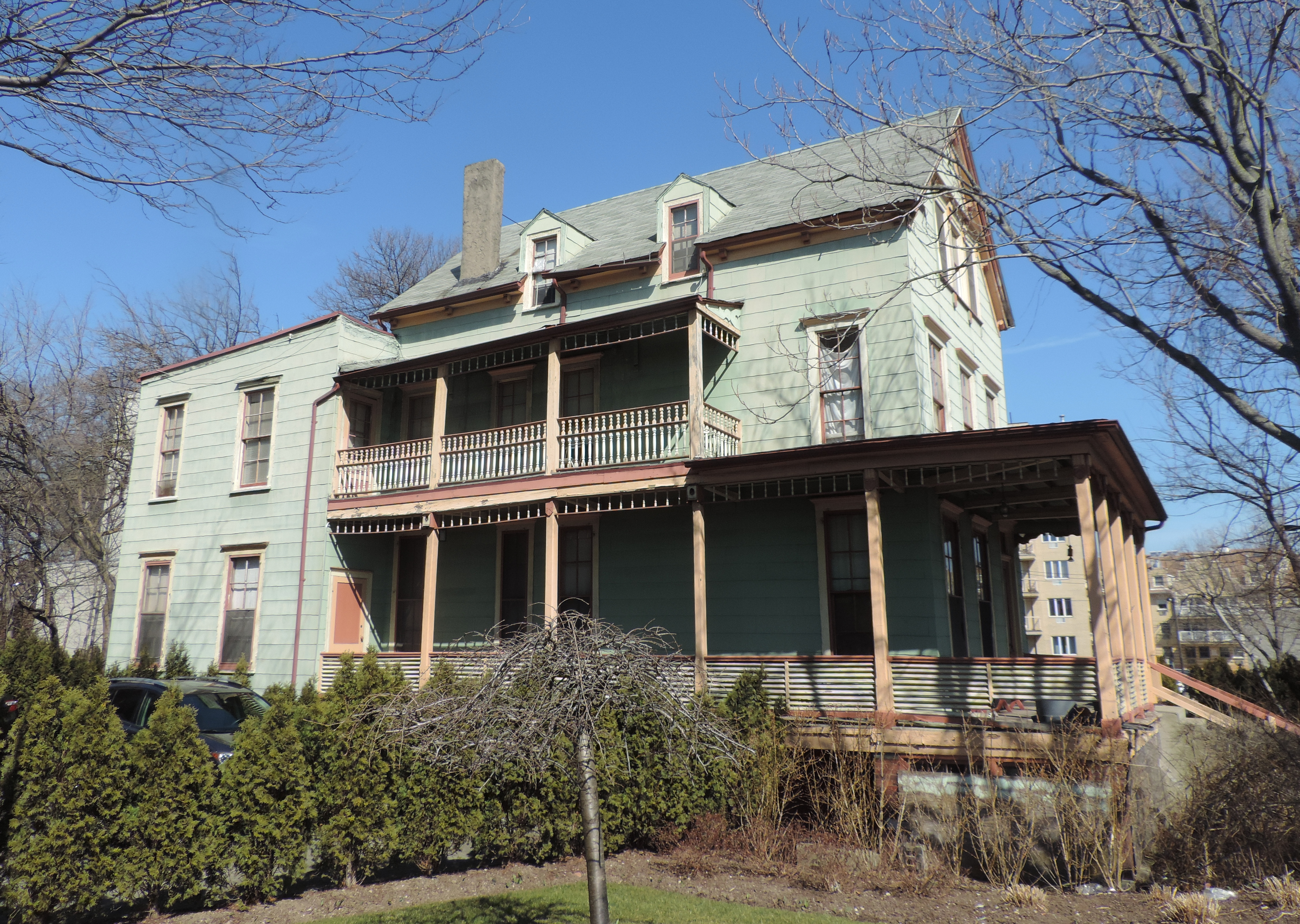
Many homes like this were built in the 1920s

Based on data from the 2010 United States census, the population of Sheepshead Bay was 64,518, a change of −78 (−0.1%) from the 64,596 counted in 2000. Covering an area of 1,459.24 acres (590.53 ha), the neighborhood had a population density of 44.2 inhabitants per acre (28,300/sq mi; 10,900/km^{2}).

The racial makeup of the neighborhood was 68.1% (43,944) White, 6.4% (4,161) African American, 0.1% (43) Native American, 15.7% (10,135) Asian, 0% (3) Pacific Islander, 0.2% (152) from other races, and 1.4% (877) from two or more races. Hispanic or Latino residents of any race were 8.1% (5,203) of the population.

The entirety of Community Board 15, which comprises Sheepshead Bay, had 173,961 inhabitants as of NYC Health's 2018 Community Health Profile, with an average life expectancy of 83.7 years. This is higher than the median life expectancy of 81.2 for all New York City neighborhoods. Most inhabitants are middle-aged adults and youth: 21% are between the ages of 0–17, 28% between 25 and 44, and 26% between 45 and 64. The ratio of college-aged and elderly residents was lower, at 8% and 17% respectively.

As of 2016, the median household income in Community Board 15 was $61,274. In 2018, an estimated 19% of Sheepshead Bay residents lived in poverty, compared to 21% in all of Brooklyn and 20% in all of New York City. One in twelve residents (8%) were unemployed, compared to 9% in the rest of both Brooklyn and New York City. Rent burden, or the percentage of residents who have difficulty paying their rent, is 53% in Sheepshead Bay, slightly higher than the citywide and boroughwide rates of 52% and 51% respectively. Based on this calculation, as of 2018, Sheepshead Bay is considered to be high-income relative to the rest of the city and not gentrifying.

In the 2020 census data from New York City Department of City Planning, southern Sheepshead Bay and nearby Manhattan Beach/Gerritsen Beach is still an overwhelming majority White population of 40,000 or more residents, between 10,000 and 19,999 Asian residents, and between 5,000 and 9,999 Hispanic residents. Meanwhile, the northern section called Madison has between 20,000 and 29,999 White residents and 5,000 to 9,999 Asian residents, while the Black and Hispanic populations were less than 5000 residents each. However, there is a significant concentrated community of Black residents inside the affordable NYCHA Development, Sheepshead Bay Houses that is located on the borderline of Sheepshead Bay and Gerritsen Beach, though the housing development also has other diverse racial populations as well.

=== Ethnic enclaves ===
There are large populations of Chinese and Russian ancestry in Sheepshead Bay. Brooklyn's Avenue U Chinatown, which emerged as the second Chinatown of Brooklyn during the late 1990s, is located partially in Sheepshead Bay and partially in nearby Homecrest. Along the waterfront is a high concentration of immigrants from the former Soviet Union, including Russians and Central Asians, similar to in nearby Brighton Beach. Other ethnic groups in the area include Albanians, Italians, Turks and Hispanics.

== Police and crime ==
Sheepshead Bay is patrolled by the 61st Precinct of the NYPD, located at 2575 Coney Island Avenue. The 61st Precinct ranked 5th safest out of 69 patrol areas for per-capita crime in 2010. As of 2018, with a non-fatal assault rate of 22 per 100,000 people, Sheepshead Bay's rate of violent crimes per capita is less than that of the city as a whole. The incarceration rate of 200 per 100,000 people is lower than that of the city as a whole.

The 61st Precinct has a lower crime rate than in the 1990s, with crimes across all categories having decreased by 88.2% between 1990 and 2018. The precinct reported one murder, 17 rapes, 150 robberies, 170 felony assaults, 169 burglaries, 584 grand larcenies, and 72 grand larcenies auto in 2018.

== Fire safety ==
Sheepshead Bay is served by three New York City Fire Department (FDNY) fire stations:

- Engine Co. 254/Ladder Co. 153 – 901 Avenue U
- Engine Co. 246/Ladder Co. 169 – 2732 East 11th Street
- Engine Co. 321/Foam 321/Brush Fire Unit 6 – 2165 Gerritsen Avenue

== Health ==
As of 2018, preterm births and births to teenage mothers are less common in Sheepshead Bay than in other places citywide. In Sheepshead Bay, there were 66 preterm births per 1,000 live births (compared to 87 per 1,000 citywide), and 12.4 births to teenage mothers per 1,000 live births (compared to 19.3 per 1,000 citywide). Sheepshead Bay has a relatively high population of residents who are uninsured, or who receive healthcare through Medicaid. In 2018, this population of uninsured residents was estimated to be 4%, which is lower than the citywide rate of 12%.

The concentration of fine particulate matter, the deadliest type of air pollutant, in Sheepshead Bay is 0.0068 milligrams per cubic metre (6.8×10^{−9} oz/ft^{3}), lower than the citywide and boroughwide averages. Seventeen percent of Sheepshead Bay residents are smokers, which is slightly higher than the city average of 14% of residents being smokers. In Sheepshead Bay, 26% of residents are obese, 9% are diabetic, and 25% have high blood pressure—compared to the citywide averages of 24%, 11%, and 28% respectively. In addition, 17% of children are obese, compared to the citywide average of 20%.

Ninety-three percent of residents eat some fruits and vegetables every day, which is higher than the city's average of 87%. In 2018, 70% of residents described their health as "good", "very good", or "excellent", less than the city's average of 78%. For every supermarket in Sheepshead Bay, there are 25 bodegas.

The nearest large hospital is the Coney Island Hospital.

== Post offices and ZIP Codes ==
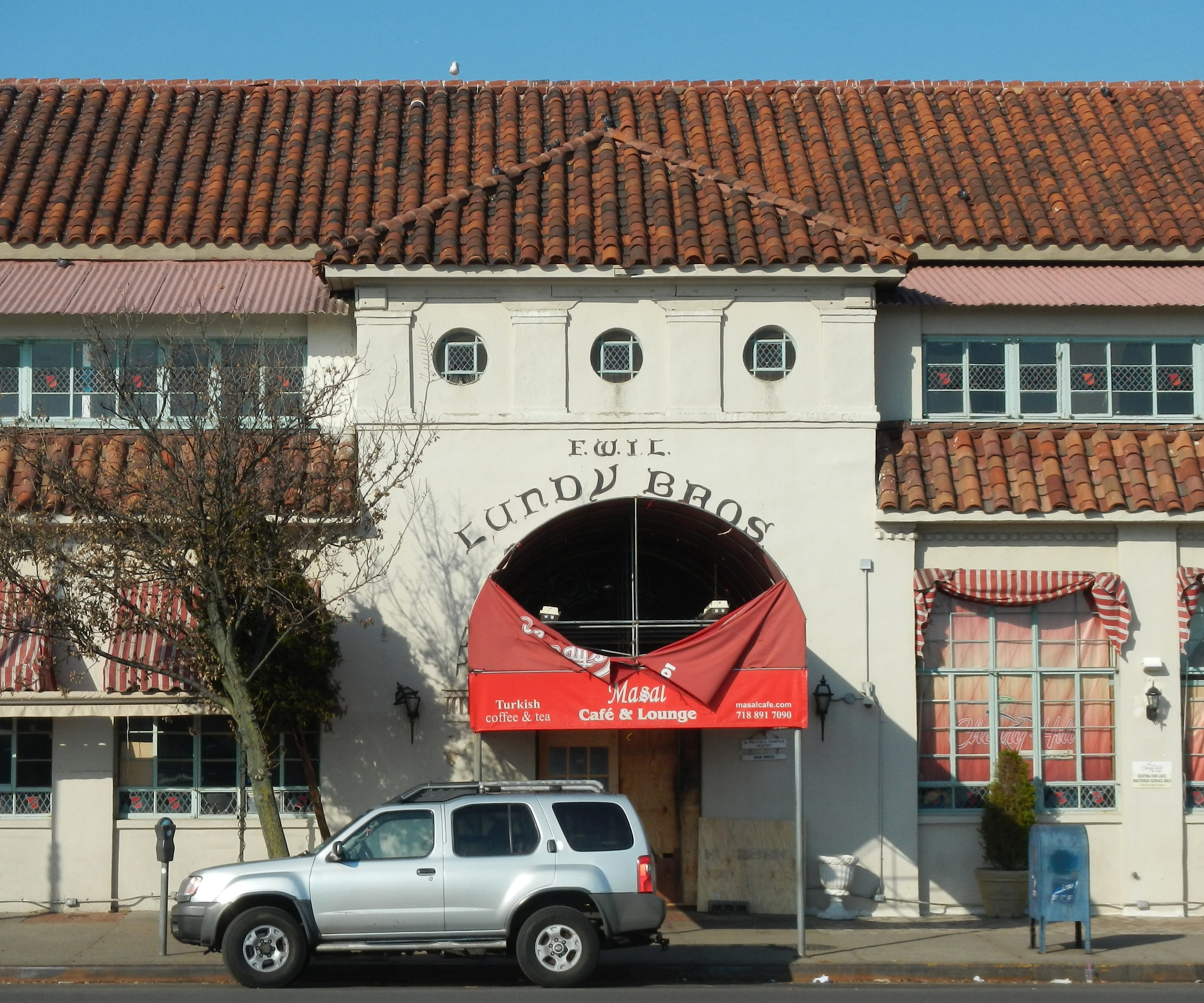
Minor damage at Lundy's Restaurant due to Hurricane Sandy

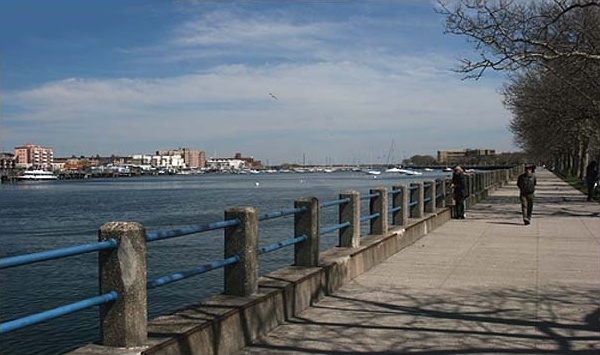
South shore of Sheepshead Bay

Sheepshead Bay is covered by ZIP Codes 11229 north of Avenue X and 11235 south of Avenue X. The United States Post Office operates four locations nearby: the Bay Station at 2628 East 18th Street, the Homecrest Station at 2370 East 19th Street, a second Homecrest Station at 2302 Avenue U, and the Nostrand Station at 2934 Avenue X.

== Education ==
Sheepshead Bay generally has a higher ratio of college-educated residents than the rest of the city as of 2018. A plurality of residents (47%) have a college education or higher, while 15% have less than a high school education and 38% are high school graduates or have some college education. By contrast, 40% of Brooklynites and 38% of city residents have a college education or higher. The percentage of Sheepshead Bay students excelling in math rose from 49 percent in 2000 to 66 percent in 2011, but reading achievement dropped from 54% to 52% during the same time period.

Sheepshead Bay's rate of elementary school student absenteeism is about equal to the rest of New York City. In Sheepshead Bay, 16% of elementary school students missed twenty or more days per school year, less than the citywide average of 20%. Additionally, 82% of high school students in Sheepshead Bay graduate on time, more than the citywide average of 75%.

=== Schools ===
Several public schools serve the community: James Madison High School; Abraham Lincoln High School, JHS 14 Shell Bank Intermediate School; The Bay Academy; and elementary schools P.S.194 PS 254, PS 206, PS 209, PS 225 and PS 52. Private schools in the area include St. Mark Catholic Academy, St. Edmund's School, and the Brooklyn Amity School. Kingsborough Community College of the City University of New York (CUNY) is nearby. The former Sheepshead Bay High School closed in 2016.

=== Libraries ===
The Brooklyn Public Library has four branches in Sheepshead Bay.

The Sheepshead Bay branch is located at 2636 East 14th Street, near Avenue Z. The branch has occupied four buildings since it was founded in 1903. The current 7,475-square-foot (694.5 m^{2}) building opened in 1963.

The Kings Bay branch is located at 3650 Nostrand Avenue between Avenues W and X. It opened in 1951, and has occupied its current location since 1959.

The Kings Highway branch is located at 2115 Ocean Ave, just south of the Midwood neighborhood. Originally opened in 1910 as an unstaffed deposit station, it moved several times during the early 20th century before arriving at its current location in 1954. The current building was the first branch library built in Brooklyn by the City of New York. The branch also includes a US Passport Office.

The Homecrest branch is located at 2525 Coney Island Ave, just south of Avenue V.

== Madison subsection ==
Map of Madison

Madison is a purely residential subsection of Sheepshead Bay, located just south of Midwood. Named after its own James Madison High School, its borders are Kings Highway to the north, Avenue U to the south, Ocean Avenue to the west, and Nostrand Avenue to the east. Madison uses the ZIP Code 11229. The area is served by Brooklyn Community Board 15.

== Transportation ==
=== Public transportation ===
New York City Subway service to Sheepshead Bay is provided by the BMT Brighton Line (B and Q trains), with local stops at Avenue U and Neck Road, and express/local stops at the Kings Highway and Sheepshead Bay stations.

New York City Bus routes in the area include the B3, B4, B36, B44, B44 SBS, B49 and B68 local buses and the BM3 express bus. The Madison subsection is also served by the B2, B7, B31, B82, B82 SBS, B100 and BM4.

=== Main thoroughfares ===
The main shopping and business thoroughfares are Emmons Avenue, Sheepshead Bay Road, Avenue U, Ocean Avenue, and Nostrand Avenue. Emmons Avenue is at the west end of the Shore Greenway which lies between Shore Parkway and Jamaica Bay, connecting eastward and northward to Canarsie and Cross Bay Boulevard. Emmons Avenue is a waterfront road with piers from which yachts and boats offer day trips for fishing and dancing.

== Notable people ==
- Herbert L. Abrams (1920–2016), medical doctor, who was involved in the anti-nuclear movement
- Stew Albert (1939–2006), early member of the Yippies and an important figure in the New Left movement of the 1960s
- Vedah Bertram (1891–1912), actress
- Elayne Boosler (born 1952), comedian
- Vitaly Borker (born 1986), Internet fraudster
- James Brady (1928–2009), columnist
- Jerry Butler (born 1939), musician
- Andrew Dice Clay (born 1957), comedian
- Reed Farrel Coleman (born 1956), writer of crime fiction and a poet
- Alan Dale (1925–2002), singer of traditional popular and rock and roll music
- Ken Dashow, writer, performer and director who is a disc jockey at New York City's WAXQ "Q104.3" classic rock radio station
- Larry David (born 1947), comedian
- Michael A. DiSpezio (born 1953), writer, performer and broadcast host
- James E. Fitzsimmons (1874–1966), thoroughbred horse trainer
- Fran Fraschilla (born 1958), basketball commentator and former college basketball coach
- Frank Frazetta (1928–2010), comic book artist
- Louis Gossett Jr. (1936–2024), actor
- Keith Green (1953–1982), gospel singer
- Terry Gross (born 1951), host of Fresh Air on National Public Radio
- Garland Jeffreys (born 1943), singer-songwriter
- Howard Kurtz (born 1953), journalist and author and host of Media Buzz on Fox News
- Margarita Levieva (born 1980), actress
- Vince Lombardi (1913–1970), NFL head coach of the Green Bay Packers
- Marty Markowitz (born 1945), former Brooklyn borough president
- Lee Mazzilli (born 1955), former New York Mets baseball player and coach for the Baltimore Orioles and New York Yankees
- Winsor McCay (c. 1866–1871 –1934), cartoonist and animator
- Anthony Melchiorri (born 1965), hospitality expert and television personality, who is the creator, co-executive producer, and host of the Travel Channel show Hotel Impossible
- Richard Migliore (born 1964), retired award-winning thoroughbred jockey and current TV analyst
- Bruce Morrow (born 1935), radio performer, known for professional purposes as Cousin Brucie or Cousin Bruce Morrow
- Donna Pescow (born 1954), film and television actress and director, known for her role as Annette in the 1977 film Saturday Night Fever
- Rico Petrocelli (born 1943), Boston Red Sox shortstop and third baseman
- Thomas Pitera (born 1954), Italian mobster
- Rockets Redglare (1949–2001), character actor and stand-up comedian
- Buddy Rich (1917–1987), jazz drummer and bandleader
- Adam Richman, actor and television host of various dining and eating-challenge programs, including Man v. Food
- Mark Roth (born 1951), professional bowler who is second in all-time professional tour earnings
- Gene Russianoff, staff attorney and chief spokesman for the Straphangers Campaign
- Judy Sheindlin (born 1942), former family court judge, known on television as Judge Judy
- Martin Shkreli (born 1983), pharmaceutical entrepreneur and convicted felon
- Joe Tacopina (born 1966), lawyer and owner/chairman of Italian soccer club Venezia F.C.
- Bob Thiele (1922–1996), record producer, musician and songwriter
- Michelle Trachtenberg (1985–2025), actress
- Bradley Tusk (born 1973), businessman, venture capitalist, political strategist and author

== Politics ==
The neighborhood is part of New York's 8th, 9th, and 10th congressional districts, respectively represented by Democrats Yvette Clarke and Hakeem Jeffries as of 2019.

It is also part of the 17th, 19th and 27th State Senate districts, represented respectively by Democrats Simcha Felder. Roxanne Persaud, Andrew Gounardes, and Diane Savino. In addition, Sheepshead Bay is covered by 41st and 45th State Assembly districts, represented respectively by Democrats Helene Weinstein and Steven Cymbrowitz.

Sheepshead Bay is located in New York City's 48th City Council district, represented by Republican Inna Vernikov. It is served by Brooklyn Community Board 15.
