= Politics of New York City =

The city government of New York City controls a budget of $112.4 billion, as of 2024. Officials receive municipal funding for their campaigns, and are elected for a maximum of two terms. City government is dominated by the Democratic Party, which also normally attracts majority support within the city in State, Congressional, and Presidential elections. The suffrage has been extended in stages since the founding of the state: African Americans (men only) received the vote in 1870 and women in 1920. Since 1968, electoral district boundaries at all levels have been drawn so as to ensure minority representation.

New York City politicians have often exerted lots of influence in other countries represented in the city's ethnic mix, as in the development of the MacBride Principles affecting employment practices in Northern Ireland. The city contains many headquarters of Federal institutions and military installations like the Intrepid.

== City budget ==
The New York City government's budget is the largest municipal budget in the United States, totaling about $112.4 billion in 2024. It employs 250,000 people, spends $23.5 billion to educate more than 1.1 million children, levies $27 billion in taxes, and receives $14 billion from federal and state governments. New York State has more than 4,200 local governments in the form of counties, cities, towns, and villages. About 52% of all revenue raised by local governments in the state is raised solely by the government of New York City, which spends it on education (28%), social services (20%), public safety (13%), and benefits and pensions (10%). New York City property taxes are lower than those in the suburbs because most of the city's revenue comes from the city's sales tax and income tax. New York City residents pay an income tax to the municipality, in addition to their New York state income taxes, based on brackets that range from 2.9% to 3.7% of state taxable income. The city income tax also features a number of fully refundable tax credits, including an Earned Income Credit.

The city has a strong imbalance of payments with the federal and state governments. As of 2022, New York City receives $0.95 cents in services for every $1.40 it sends to Washington in taxes (or annually sends $13.1 billion more to Washington than it receives back), marking it as one of the states that subsidize federal spending in other regions. The city also sends an additional $11.1 billion more each year to the state of New York than it receives back. The city's total tax burden is among the highest in the United States.

== Party strength ==
New York City (5 boroughs) presidential election results
Year	Democratic		Republican	
2024	68.10%	1,903,344	30.01%	838,838
2020	76.19%	2,321,759	22.70%	691,682
2016	79.95%	2,191,869	17.04%	467,254
2012	81.19%	1,995,241	17.78%	436,889
2008	79.29%	2,074,159	20.06%	524,787
2004	74.99%	1,828,015	24.10%	587,534
2000	77.90%	1,703,364	18.23%	398,726
1996	77.10%	1,512,248	17.31%	339,537
1992	68.72%	1,458,784	24.00%	509,423
1988	66.17%	1,340,795	32.84%	665,407
1984	60.96%	1,343,875	38.66%	852,317
1980	54.88%	1,052,178	37.51%	719,278
1976	66.37%	1,423,380	32.95%	706,663
1972	51.46%	1,342,996	48.27%	1,259,873
1968	60.56%	1,582,681	33.94%	886,959
1964	73.02%	2,183,646	26.81%	801,877
1960	62.62%	1,936,323	37.04%	1,145,205
1956	51.10%	1,617,701	48.90%	1,548,132
1952	54.54%	1,861,930	43.79%	1,495,493
1948	49.47%	1,596,545	34.34%	1,108,288
1944	61.64%	2,042,500	38.36%	1,271,287
1940	61.18%	1,966,083	38.82%	1,247,624
1936	75.40%	2,041,347	24.60%	665,951
1932	67.31%	1,455,176	27.02%	584,056
1928	62.06%	1,167,971	37.94%	714,144
1924	35.02%	489,199	44.83%	626,131
1920	27.34%	345,001	62.29%	785,947
1916	52.95%	353,235	47.05%	313,813
1912	49.76%	312,386	20.16%	126,582
1908	48.52%	284,190	51.48%	301,568
1904	53.05%	326,900	46.95%	289,345
1900	52.47%	309,524	47.53%	280,343

The Democratic Party holds the majority of public offices. As of 2024, 56 percent of registered voters in the city identify as Democrats, 26% as Republicans, and 18% identify as neither. There are pockets of Republican strength in some sections of Brooklyn and Queens, and a large Republican stronghold in the more suburban Staten Island, totaling 26% of registered voters. In 2022, the city has 39% of the state's registered voters and 43% of the state's total population.

The Working Families Party, affiliated with the labor movement and progressive community activists, is a force in city politics. Its platforms are centered on economic justice, healthcare for all, environmental justice, and social justice.

== History ==
=== Voting rules ===
In the 1820s, New York State removed all property qualifications for the right to vote for whites but retained them for blacks. In 1846 voters in New York State rejected a proposed amendment to the state constitution that would guarantee blacks the same voting rights as whites. In 1870, however, five years after the Civil War, the 15th Amendment to the U.S. Constitution was ratified, giving blacks throughout the United States the same voting rights as whites.

Three suffragists casting votes in New York City around 1918

New York City introduced a uniform ballot listing all candidates in 1880. To get on it, an office seeker would have to be nominated by a political party or submit nominating petitions, laying the groundwork for a system that persists to this day. In 1894 bipartisan control of elections was introduced, establishing a system in effect to this day. All election positions, from Board of Elections commissioners to election inspectors, must be divided equally between the two major parties.

A voting machine developed by Jacob H. Myers, was used in Lockport, New York in 1892. By the early 1920s, voting machines would be used for all general elections in New York City. A 1915 referendum giving women the vote was defeated by city and state voters, but in 1920 the 19th Amendment to the U.S. Constitution was signed into law, guaranteeing women throughout the United States the right to vote.

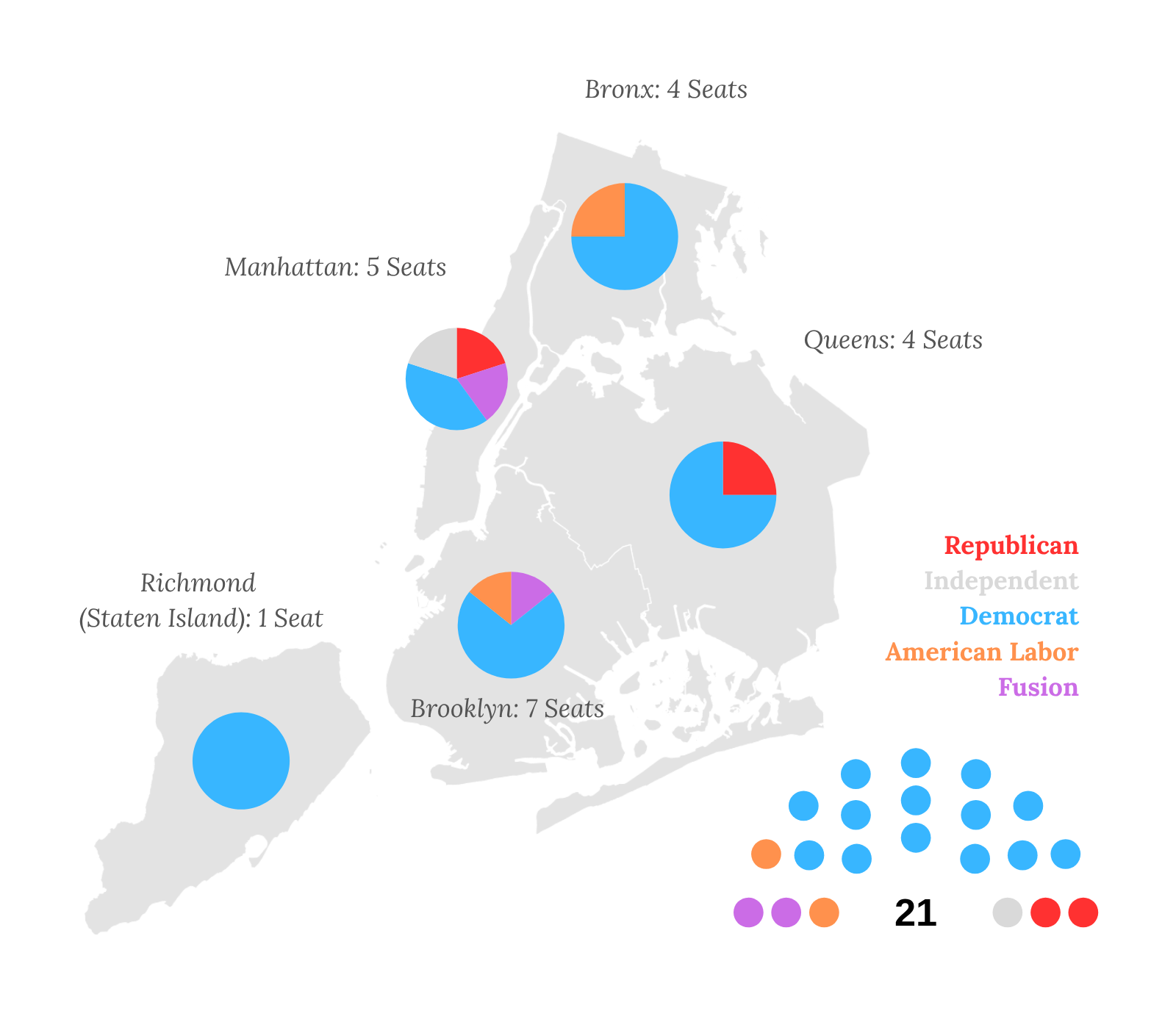
Results of the 1939 New York City council election by borough using STV.

By 1930s 65 aldermen were being elected using single-member wards. This led to strong Tammany Hall dominance interspersed by short periods of reform activity and representation, plus disproportional results party-wise and borough-wise. To address this, New York City used single transferable voting proportional representation to elect its city councillors from 1937 to 1945. Each voter had just one vote while each borough was treated as a whole, with each electing multiple city councillors.

In 1967, a suit brought under the Voting Rights Act passed by the U.S. Congress two years earlier led to the creation of the majority black 12th Congressional District in Brooklyn. Previously, black voters had been divided among several predominantly white districts. Under the Act, Manhattan, Brooklyn, and the Bronx are subject to preclearance by the Department of Justice before implementing any changes affecting voting. In 1968, voters in the district elected Shirley Chisholm as the first black woman ever in the U.S. House of Representatives. Since then, congressional, state legislative, and City Council districts have been drawn so as to ensure minority representation.

Non-citizens who have children in public schools were given the right to vote in elections for members of community school boards in 1969 (those boards no longer exist). Starting in 1975 election information was provided in Spanish as well as English, and in 1992 the City introduced ballots in Chinese.

As of May 2013, a new bill has begun working its way through the NYC political system to allow noncitizens living in the five boroughs the right to vote in local elections. It has enough projected votes in the NYC City Council to overrule an expected Mayoral veto. It is unclear whether this new law (if passed) will actually be valid.

In December 2021, the city council voted to allow non-citizens within New York City to vote in elections. However, the bill was overturned by a NYS court judge in 2022 on the grounds of noncitizen voting being unconstitutional according to the New York State constitution. A NYS appeals court affirmed the decision to block the bill in 2025 with a 6-1 majority.

=== Electoral reform ===
In 1937, New York City began to elect its city council through Single transferable voting. Unusually the variety of STV it adopted used the "uniform quota" where anyone who received 75,000 votes was elected and perhaps others who came close if that was needed to fill the seats.

The city also used its boroughs as its electoral districts, and they had a range of district magnitude (number of members). The NYC STV was unique for having a novel provision where the number of councilors representing a borough was tied to voter turnout in that borough. This meant that the number of councilors varied from election to election, but it intuitively ensured that each borough had the representation that it deserved, which had not been the case previously due to the city's districting lagging behind shifts in population. Under NYC's STV, total seats on council varied: 1937 New York City Council election 25 seats, 1939 New York City Council election 21 seats, 1941 26 seats, 1943 17 seats, and 1945 23 seats.

=== Term limits and campaign finance ===
New York has a municipal campaign finance system. The New York City Campaign Finance Board (NYCCFB) gives public matching funds to qualifying candidates, who in exchange submit to strict contribution and spending limits and a full audit of their finances. Citywide candidates in the program are required to take part in debates. Corporate contributions are banned and political action committees must register with the city.

A two-term limit was imposed on most elected officials, including the Mayor and City Council, but excluding the Districts Attorney, after a 1993 referendum. In 1996, voters turned down a City Council proposal to extend term limits. The movement to introduce term limits was led by Ronald Lauder, a cosmetics heir, who spent $4 million on the two referendums.

In 2008 the City Council voted 29–22 to overturn two referendums and to extend the term limits to three terms. These limits were reinstated as part of an NYC Charter update voted in by the electorate.

== Federal connections ==
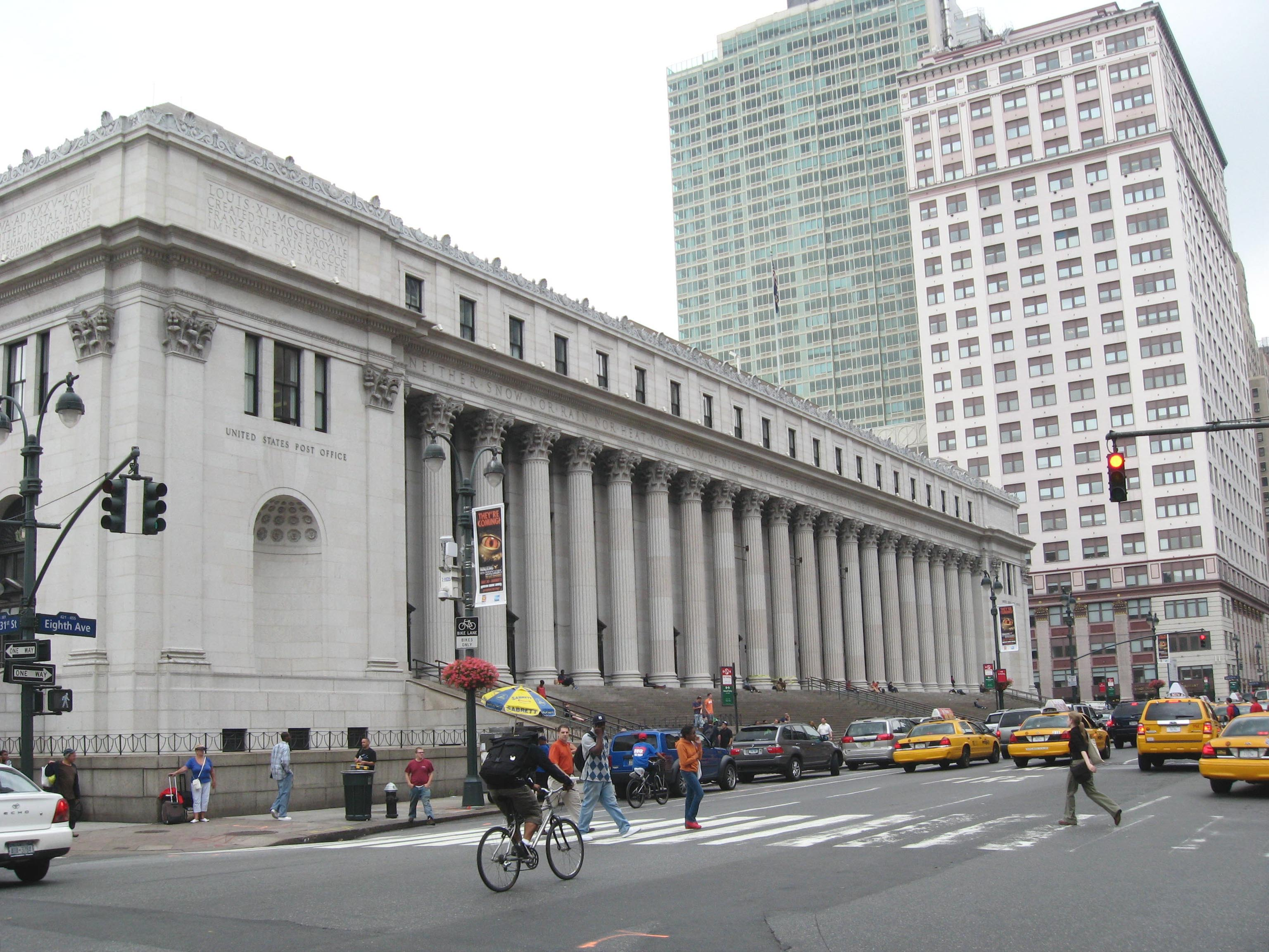
James A. Farley Post Office

The United States Post Office operates post offices in New York City. The James A. Farley Post Office in Midtown Manhattan is the city's main post office. The post office stopped 24-hour service beginning on May 9, 2009, due to decreasing mail traffic. Brooklyn, The Bronx, and Staten Island each have central and/or main post offices. Queens has three, each serving one of the former townships of Queens County.

New York City also has federal buildings in downtown Manhattan that house buildings for the United States Attorney and the FBI.

New York's military installations include the United States Army post of Fort Hamilton, primarily used by the Army National Guard and the United States Army Reserve. It is located in the Bay Ridge section of Brooklyn under the shadow of the Verrazzano–Narrows Bridge. The bridge spans the Narrows and connects to Staten Island, where Coast Guard base Fort Wadsworth lies under the bridge's shadow. Fort Totten is another military installation located in Queens near the Throggs Neck Bridge.

== See also ==
New York City-related articles:

- Government of New York City
- Elections in New York City
- New York City mayoral elections
- Tammany Hall
- Kings County Democratic Committee
- New York County Democratic Committee
- Government and politics in Brooklyn

New York State-related articles:

- Elections in New York
- Politics of New York (state)
- American Labor Party
- Conservative Party of New York
- Independence Party of New York
- Liberal Party of New York
- New York State Right to Life Party
- Working Families Party
