= 1965 New York City Council presidential election =

- November 2, 1965
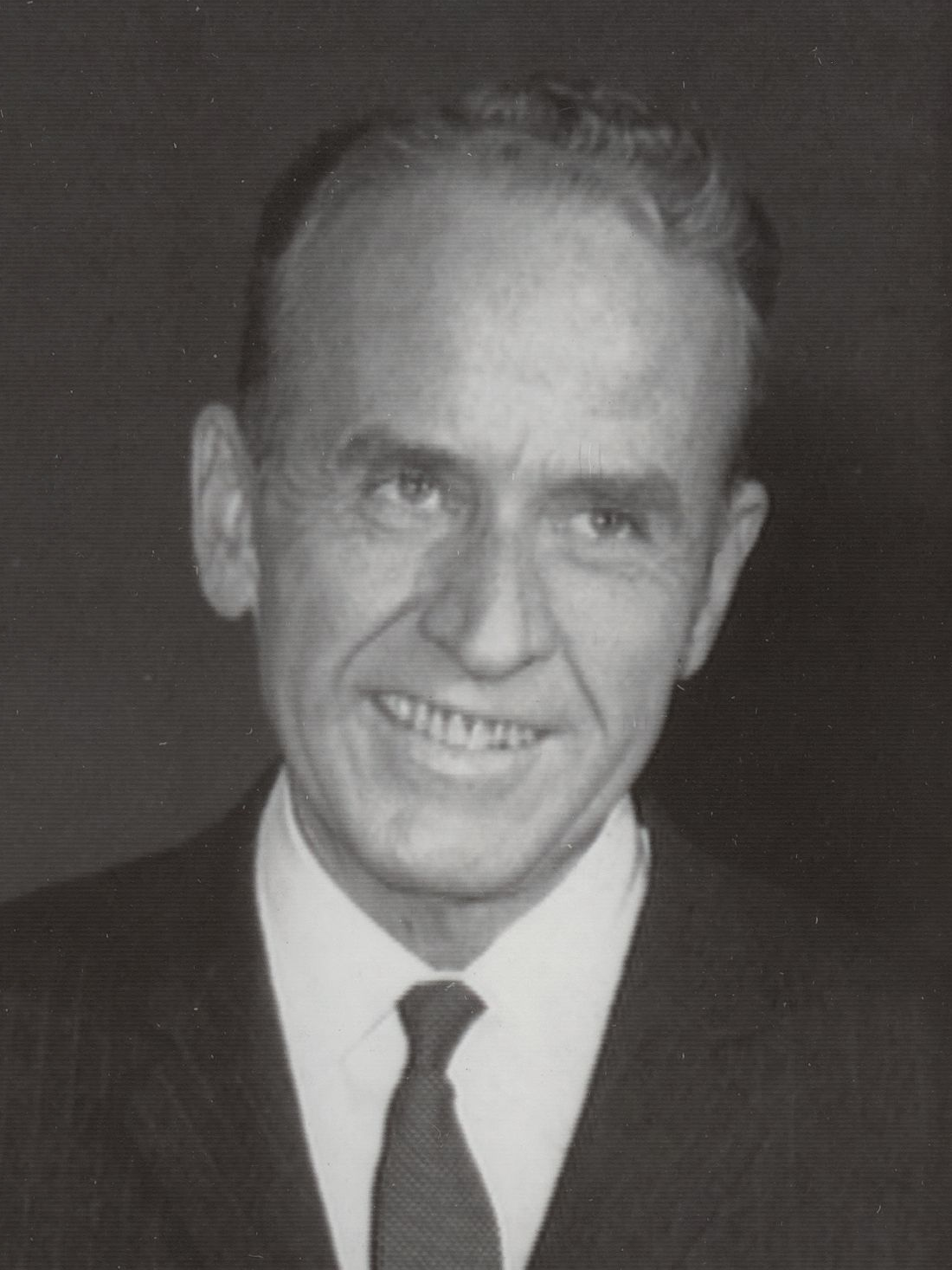

| Nominee | Frank D. O'Connor | Timothy W. Costello | Rosemary G. Moffett |
| Party | Democratic | Liberal | Conservative |
| Alliance | | Republican; CSF |
| Popular vote | 1,336,260 | 939,479 | 208,386 |
| Percentage | 53.2% | 37.4% | 8.3% |
President of the City Council before election
Paul Screvane
Democratic
Elected President of the City Council
Frank D. O'Connor
Democratic

An election was held on November 2, 1965, to elect the President of the New York City Council. Democratic incumbent Paul Screvane ran for mayor, leaving the office open for the next term. Queens district attorney Frank D. O'Connor won the Democratic primary and general election to succeed him.

== Democratic primary ==
=== Candidates ===
- Anna Arnold Hedgeman, former city liaison to the United Nations and candidate for U.S. Representative in 1960 (running with William Fitts Ryan)
- Daniel Patrick Moynihan, Assistant U.S. Secretary of Labor for Policy Planning and Research (running with Paul Screvane)
- Frank D. O'Connor, Queens County District Attorney (running with Abraham Beame)
- W. Bernard Richland, attorney (running with Paul O'Dwyer)

=== Results ===
1965 Democratic Council President primary
| Party | Candidate | Votes | % |
|---|---|---|---|
| Democratic | Frank D. O'Connor | 350,462 | 49.38% |
| Democratic | Daniel Patrick Moynihan | 260,312 | 36.67% |
| Democratic | Anna A. Hedgeman | 79,677 | 11.23% |
| Democratic | W. Bernard Richland | 19,331 | 2.72% |
| Total votes | | 709,782 | 100.00% |

== General election ==
=== Candidates ===
- Timothy W. Costello, chair of the Liberal Party of New York (Republican, Liberal and Civil Service Fusion)
- Rosemary G. Moffett (Conservative)
- Frank D. O'Connor, Queens County District Attorney (Democratic)

=== Results ===
1965 New York City Council President election
| Party | Candidate | Votes | % | ±% |
|---|---|---|---|---|
| Democratic | Frank D. O'Connor | 1,336,260 | 53.15% | |
| Republican | Timothy W. Costello | 695,226 | 27.65% | |
| Liberal | Timothy W. Costello | 166,159 | 6.61% | |
| CSF | Timothy W. Costello | 78,094 | 3.11% | |
| Total | Timothy W. Costello | 939,497 | 37.37% | |
| Conservative | Rosemary G. Moffett | 208,386 | 8.29% | |
| Total votes | | 2,514,125 | 100.00% | |
