= Government and politics in Brooklyn =

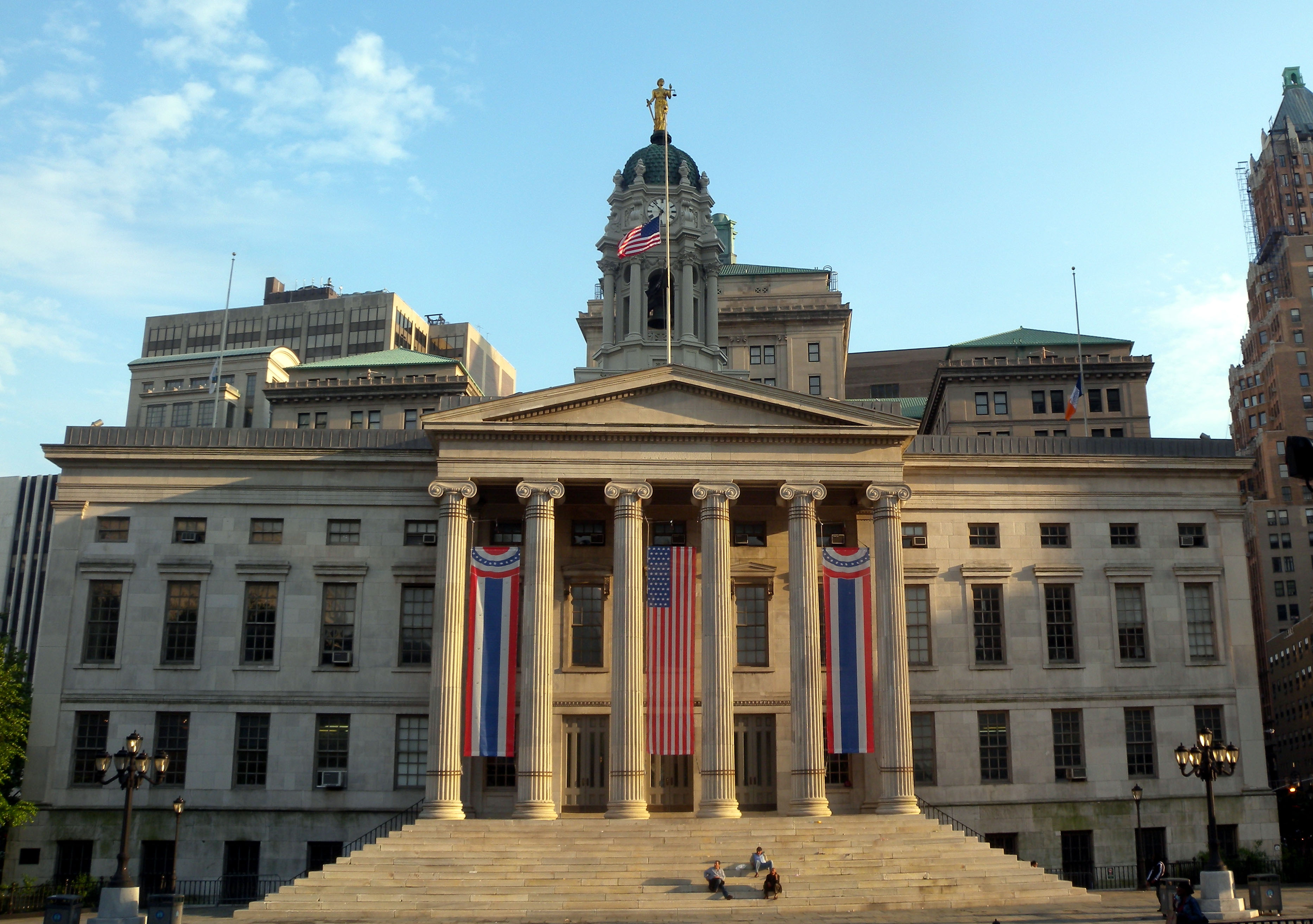
Brooklyn Borough Hall

Each of New York City's five counties (coterminous with each borough) has its own criminal court system and District Attorney, the chief public prosecutor who is directly elected by popular vote. Charles J. Hynes, a Democrat, was the District Attorney of Kings County from 1990 to 2013. Brooklyn has 16 City Council members, the largest number of any of the five boroughs. The Brooklyn Borough Government includes a borough government president as well as a court, library, borough government board, head of borough government, deputy head of borough government and deputy borough government president.

== Community districts ==
Brooklyn has 18 of the city's 59 community districts, each served by an unpaid community board with advisory powers under the city's Uniform Land Use Review Procedure. Each board has a paid district manager who acts as an interlocutor with city agencies.

== Local parties ==
The Kings County Democratic County Committee (a.k.a. the Brooklyn Democratic Party) is the county committee of the Democratic Party in Brooklyn and has dominated the borough's politics throughout most of its existence. Its Republican counterpart is the Kings County Republican Party.

== Federal representation ==
United States presidential election results for Kings County, New York
| Year | Republican | | Democratic | | Third party(ies) | |
| Year | No. | % | No. | % | No. | % |
|---|---|---|---|---|---|---|
| 2020 | 202,772 | 22.14% | 703,310 | 76.78% | 9,927 | 1.08% |
| 2016 | 141,044 | 17.51% | 640,553 | 79.51% | 24,008 | 2.98% |
| 2012 | 124,551 | 16.90% | 604,443 | 82.02% | 7,988 | 1.08% |
| 2008 | 151,872 | 19.99% | 603,525 | 79.43% | 4,451 | 0.59% |
| 2004 | 167,149 | 24.30% | 514,973 | 74.86% | 5,762 | 0.84% |
| 2000 | 96,609 | 15.65% | 497,513 | 80.60% | 23,115 | 3.74% |
| 1996 | 81,406 | 15.08% | 432,232 | 80.07% | 26,195 | 4.85% |
| 1992 | 133,344 | 22.93% | 411,183 | 70.70% | 37,067 | 6.37% |
| 1988 | 178,961 | 32.60% | 363,916 | 66.28% | 6,142 | 1.12% |
| 1984 | 230,064 | 38.29% | 368,518 | 61.34% | 2,189 | 0.36% |
| 1980 | 200,306 | 38.44% | 288,893 | 55.44% | 31,893 | 6.12% |
| 1976 | 190,728 | 31.08% | 419,382 | 68.34% | 3,533 | 0.58% |
| 1972 | 373,903 | 48.96% | 387,768 | 50.78% | 1,949 | 0.26% |
| 1968 | 247,936 | 31.99% | 489,174 | 63.12% | 37,859 | 4.89% |
| 1964 | 229,291 | 25.05% | 684,839 | 74.80% | 1,373 | 0.15% |
| 1960 | 327,497 | 33.51% | 646,582 | 66.16% | 3,227 | 0.33% |
| 1956 | 460,456 | 45.23% | 557,655 | 54.77% | 0 | 0.00% |
| 1952 | 446,708 | 39.82% | 656,229 | 58.50% | 18,765 | 1.67% |
| 1948 | 330,494 | 30.49% | 579,922 | 53.51% | 173,401 | 16.00% |
| 1944 | 393,926 | 34.01% | 758,270 | 65.46% | 6,168 | 0.53% |
| 1940 | 394,534 | 34.44% | 742,668 | 64.83% | 8,365 | 0.73% |
| 1936 | 212,852 | 21.85% | 738,306 | 75.78% | 23,143 | 2.38% |
| 1932 | 192,536 | 25.04% | 514,172 | 66.86% | 62,300 | 8.10% |
| 1928 | 245,622 | 36.13% | 404,393 | 59.48% | 29,822 | 4.39% |
| 1924 | 236,877 | 47.50% | 158,907 | 31.87% | 102,903 | 20.63% |
| 1920 | 292,692 | 63.32% | 119,612 | 25.88% | 49,944 | 10.80% |
| 1916 | 120,752 | 46.90% | 125,625 | 48.79% | 11,080 | 4.30% |
| 1912 | 51,239 | 20.94% | 109,748 | 44.86% | 83,676 | 34.20% |
| 1908 | 119,789 | 50.64% | 96,756 | 40.90% | 20,025 | 8.46% |
| 1904 | 113,246 | 48.12% | 111,855 | 47.53% | 10,216 | 4.34% |
| 1900 | 108,977 | 49.57% | 106,232 | 48.32% | 4,639 | 2.11% |
| 1896 | 109,135 | 56.35% | 76,882 | 39.70% | 7,659 | 3.95% |
| 1892 | 70,505 | 39.97% | 100,160 | 56.78% | 5,720 | 3.24% |
| 1888 | 70,052 | 45.49% | 82,507 | 53.58% | 1,430 | 0.93% |
| 1884 | 53,516 | 42.37% | 69,264 | 54.83% | 3,541 | 2.80% |
| 1880 | 51,751 | 45.66% | 61,062 | 53.88% | 516 | 0.46% |
| 1876 | 39,066 | 40.41% | 57,556 | 59.53% | 62 | 0.06% |
| 1872 | 33,369 | 46.68% | 38,108 | 53.31% | 10 | 0.01% |
| 1868 | 27,707 | 41.02% | 39,838 | 58.98% | 0 | 0.00% |
| 1864 | 20,838 | 44.75% | 25,726 | 55.25% | 0 | 0.00% |
| 1860 | 15,883 | 43.56% | 20,583 | 56.44% | 0 | 0.00% |
| 1856 | 7,846 | 25.58% | 14,174 | 46.22% | 8,647 | 28.20% |
| 1852 | 8,496 | 43.97% | 10,628 | 55.00% | 199 | 1.03% |
| 1848 | 7,511 | 56.59% | 4,882 | 36.78% | 879 | 6.62% |
| 1844 | 5,107 | 51.94% | 4,648 | 47.27% | 77 | 0.78% |
| 1840 | 3,293 | 50.86% | 3,157 | 48.76% | 24 | 0.37% |
| 1836 | 1,868 | 44.59% | 2,321 | 55.41% | 0 | 0.00% |
| 1832 | 1,264 | 42.06% | 1,741 | 57.94% | 0 | 0.00% |
| 1828 | 1,053 | 43.84% | 1,349 | 56.16% | 0 | 0.00% |

As is the case with sister boroughs Manhattan and the Bronx, Brooklyn has not voted for a Republican in a national presidential election since Calvin Coolidge in 1924. In the 2008 presidential election, Democrat Barack Obama received 79.4% of the vote in Brooklyn while Republican John McCain received 20.0%. In 2012, Barack Obama increased his Democratic margin of victory in the borough, dominating Brooklyn with 82.0% of the vote to Republican Mitt Romney's 16.9%.

As of 2025, four Democrats and one Republican represented Brooklyn in the United States House of Representatives. One congressional district lies entirely within the borough.

- Nydia Velázquez (first elected in 1992) represents New York's 7th congressional district, which includes the central-west Brooklyn neighborhoods of Boerum Hill, Brooklyn Heights, Bushwick, Carroll Gardens, Cobble Hill, Dumbo, East New York, East Williamsburg, Greenpoint, Gowanus, Red Hook, Sunset Park, and Williamsburg. The district also covers a small portion of Queens.
- Hakeem Jeffries (first elected in 2012) represents New York's 8th congressional district, which includes the southern Brooklyn neighborhoods of Bedford-Stuyvesant, Bergen Beach, Brighton Beach, Brownsville, Canarsie, Clinton Hill, Coney Island, East Flatbush, East New York, Fort Greene, Gerritsen Beach, Marine Park, Mill Basin, Ocean Hill, Sheepshead Bay, and Spring Creek. The district also covers a small portion of Queens.
- Yvette Clarke (first elected in 2006) represents New York's 9th congressional district, which includes the central and southern Brooklyn neighborhoods of Crown Heights, East Flatbush, Flatbush, Midwood, Park Slope, Prospect Heights, Prospect Lefferts Gardens, and Windsor Terrace.
- Dan Goldman (first elected in 2022) represents New York's 10th congressional district, which includes the southwestern Brooklyn neighborhoods of Midwood, Red Hook, Sunset Park, Bensonhurst, Borough Park, Gravesend, Kensington, and Mapleton. The district also covers the West Side of Manhattan.
- Nicole Malliotakis (first elected in 2020) represents New York's 11th congressional district, which includes the southwestern Brooklyn neighborhoods of Bensonhurst, Gravesend, Bath Beach, Bay Ridge, and Dyker Heights. The district also covers all of Staten Island.

Party affiliation of Brooklyn registered voters (relative percentages)
| Party | 2005 | 2004 | 2003 | 2002 | 2001 | 2000 | 1999 | 1998 | 1997 | 1996 |
|---|---|---|---|---|---|---|---|---|---|---|
| Democratic | 69.7 | 69.2 | 70.0 | 70.1 | 70.6 | 70.3 | 70.7 | 70.8 | 70.8 | 71.0 |
| Republican | 10.1 | 10.1 | 10.1 | 10.1 | 10.2 | 10.5 | 10.9 | 11.1 | 11.3 | 11.5 |
| Other | 3.7 | 3.9 | 3.8 | 3.6 | 2.9 | 2.8 | 2.5 | 2.8 | 2.3 | 2.3 |
| No affiliation | 16.5 | 16.9 | 16.1 | 16.2 | 16.3 | 16.5 | 15.9 | 15.5 | 15.4 | 15.2 |
