= Sebastian Leone =

American politician & judge (1924–2016)

Sebastian "Sam" Leone (December 6, 1924 — November 14, 2016) was the borough president of Brooklyn from 1970 to 1976 and a justice of New York Supreme Court from 1977 to 2001.

== Early life ==
Leone was born on the Lower East Side of Manhattan in 1924 to Anthony Leone and Josephine Gilistro. As an infant, he and his family moved to Bensonhurst. He attended P.S. 97, David Boody Junior High School, and Lafayette High School, all in Brooklyn, and after a stint in the U.S. Army, graduated from St. John's University in Queens in 1946.

== Political career ==
Leone got his start in politics in 1948, when as a law student he met Frank J. Pino, then a New York State Assemblyman, who had come into the Leone family's grocery store in Bensonhurst. He rang doorbells and spoke to voters on behalf of Mr. Pino, who was in a tough reelection fight that year. After Pino won his election, Leone joined the United Democratic Club in Bensonhurst.

Leone graduated from his undergraduate alma mater's law school in February 1949 and entered private practice shortly thereafter. After two years he set up his own law firm, then formed a partnership with Irwin R. Brownstein, who later became a New York legislator and a judge. In 1965, Leone became a law secretary to Judge Philip M. Kleinfeld, who had also been a long-time legislator and judge, and at that time was a judge in the Appellate Division in Brooklyn. The next year, Leone became district leader of the United Democratic Club, a post previously held by Brownstein. After five years as Kleinfeld's law secretary, Leone was "angling to become a Civil Court judge," but the Brooklyn Borough President, Abe Stark, became ill and decided to resign, leaving a three-year unexpired term. Leone was selected by Meade Esposito, the long-time Brooklyn Democratic leader, to be Stark's replacement, and was promptly elected interim Borough President by the Brooklyn City Council delegation on September 9, 1970. He was formally installed as borough president on September 18, 1970. Two months later, the voters elected him to serve the remainder of Stark's term, and in November 1973, he was elected to his own full term.

== Judicial career ==
Leone was averse to the fund-raising required for political office, so in 1976, he was nominated for a position as a justice of the New York Supreme Court. He served from January 1977 until he retired in January 2001.

== Personal life ==
Leone married Helene Morgenstern in 1966, and they had a son, Matthew. He died November 14, 2016.

== In popular culture ==
The opening credits of the television show Welcome Back, Kotter, which was set in Brooklyn, began with the image of a large highway sign that read, "Welcome to Brooklyn, 4th Largest City in America, Hon. Sebastian Leone Borough President".

Political offices
Preceded by Abe Stark	Borough President of Brooklyn; 1970-1976	Succeeded by Howard Golden
