= 1965 New York City mayoral election =

- November 2, 1965
- Registered: 3,281,689
- Turnout: 2,652,451; 80.82% (▲4.66 pp)
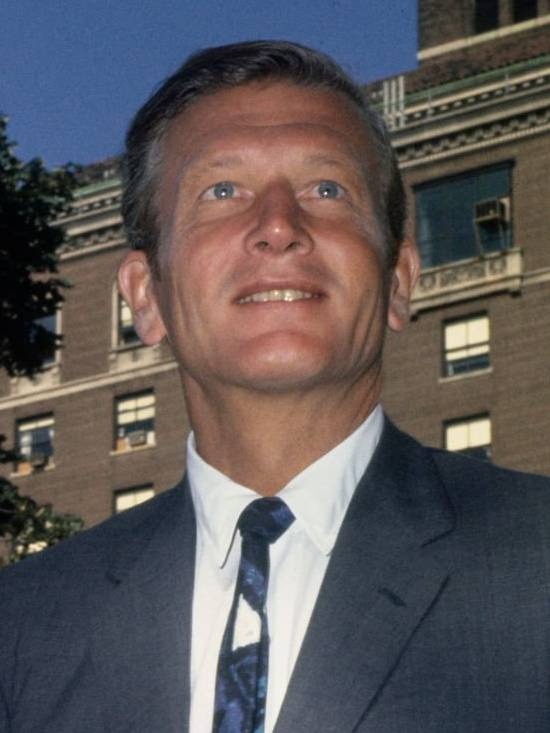

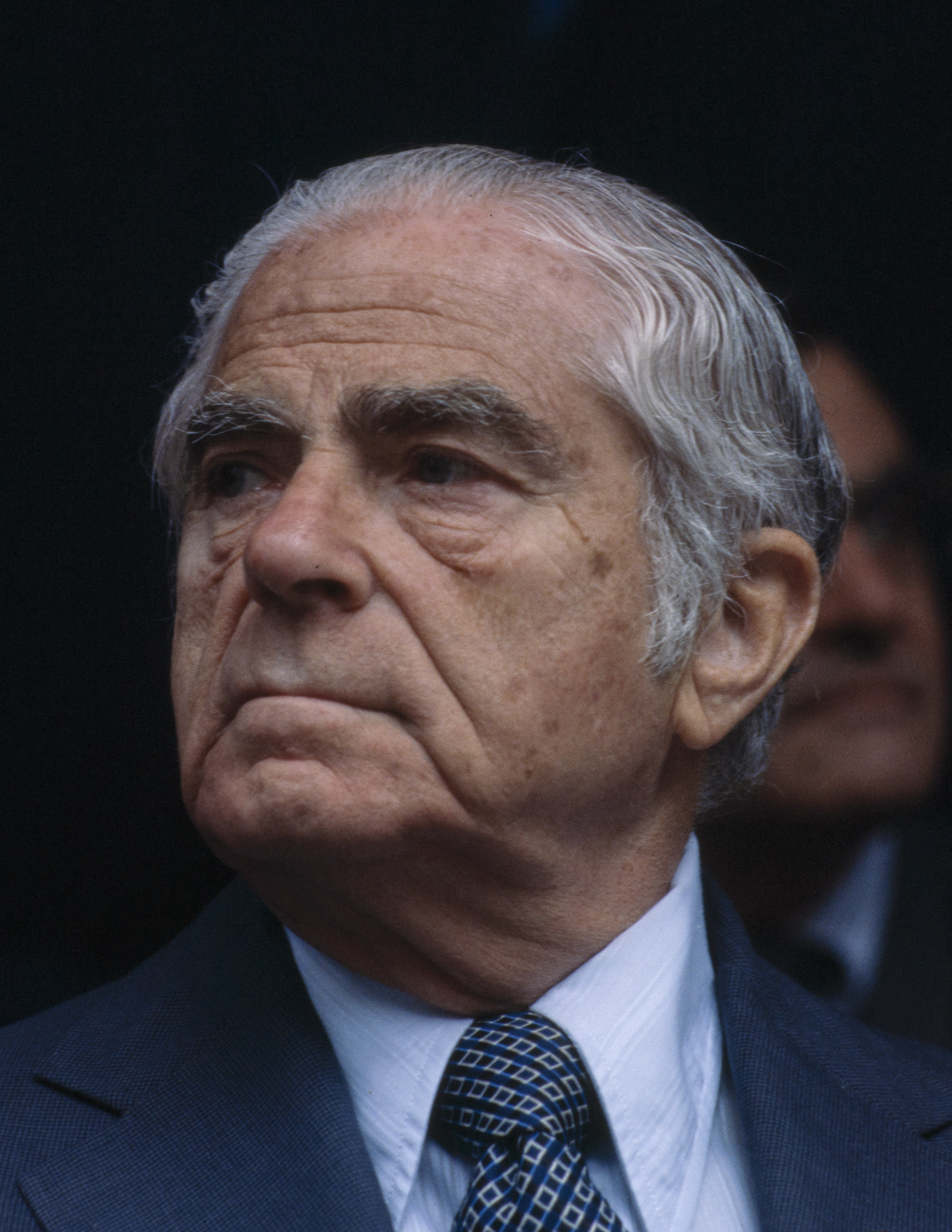

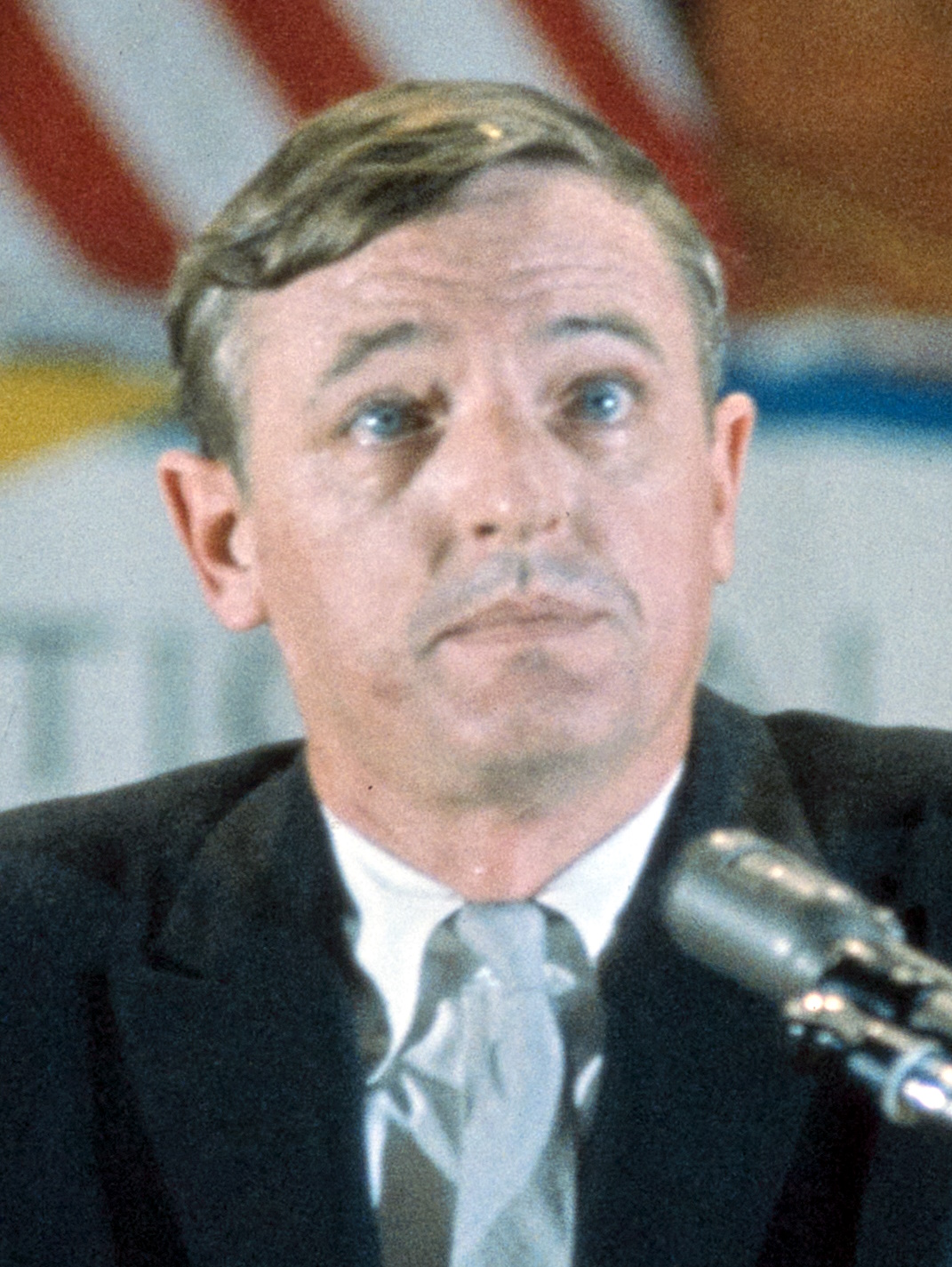
Candidate	John Lindsay	Abraham Beame	William F. Buckley Jr.
Party	Republican	Democratic	Conservative
Alliance	Liberal	Civil Service
Popular vote	1,149,106	1,046,699	341,226
Percentage	45.0%	41.0%	13.4%
- Results by Borough; Lindsay: 40–50% 50–60% Beame: 40–50%
Mayor before election
Robert F. Wagner, Jr.
Democratic
Elected Mayor
John Lindsay
Republican

The 1965 New York City mayoral election occurred on Tuesday, November 2, 1965, with Republican Congressman John Lindsay winning a close plurality victory over the Democratic candidate, New York City Comptroller Abraham Beame.

Lindsay received 44.99% of the vote to Beame's 40.98%, a victory margin of 4.01%. Finishing in a distant third was the candidate of the recently formed Conservative Party, conservative author and commentator William F. Buckley Jr., who received 13.36% of the vote, but whose unexpectedly strong support made the race "one of the most memorable ... in New York history." Lindsay and Beame received the Liberal and Civil Service ballot line respectively. Lindsay won a decisive majority in Manhattan, while winning comfortable plurality victories in Queens and Staten Island. Beame won pluralities in the Bronx and Brooklyn. This was the first time since 1941, and the last time until 1993, that Republicans won a mayoral election in New York City.

== Background ==
In 1961, mayor Robert F. Wagner Jr. was re-elected to a third consecutive term. Wagner was generally popular in the city and had a reputation for integrity as an opponent of Tammany Hall.

Nevertheless, popular Republican Congressman John Lindsay from the Upper East Side began to explore a run for mayor. In 1963, he told the New York Herald Tribune editorial board he would consider a campaign for mayor, adding, "Washington, compared to New York City, is a very shallow place. It's got politics, endless white marble, and some very good museums. Beyond that it has very little." Lindsay won a landslide re-election in 1964 despite his party's own defeat at the national and state level. In a January 1965 speech to the Executives Club of Chicago titled, "The Republican Challenge," Lindsay outlined his belief that Republicans needed to "recapture the center" and could not ignore American cities "where 70 percent of the vote is found. How can Republicans as the best pragmatists of all ignore this area?"

Lindsay's efforts were aided by media attention on the issue of urban neglect, led by Jock Whitney, owner of the Herald Tribune and one of Lindsay's top campaign funders. As early as 1963, Whitney and publisher Walter Thayer had sought to use the paper to support a reform candidate for mayor. Though other pieces on declining quality of life in the city were published by Look and Richard J. Whalen, the Herald Tribune led with a multi-part, pessimistic series on New York City drug use, pollution, welfare, healthcare, one-party rule, capital and white flight, crime, and bureaucratic inefficiencies. Lindsay later admitted the editorial series provided a raison d'etre for his campaign, and when Wagner ultimately chose not to run for an expected fourth term, the Herald Tribune staff claimed credit.

== Democratic primary ==
=== Candidates ===
- Abraham Beame, New York City Comptroller
- Paul O'Dwyer, member of the City Council from Manhattan at-large
- Paul R. Screvane, President of the New York City Council
- William Fitts Ryan, U.S. Representative from the Upper West Side

==== Withdrew ====
- Frank D. O'Connor, Queens County District Attorney (ran for Council President)

==== Declined ====
- Franklin D. Roosevelt Jr., chair of the Equal Employment Opportunity Commission and former U.S. Undersecretary of Commerce
- Robert F. Wagner Jr., incumbent mayor since 1954 (declined June 10)

=== Campaign ===
On June 10, 1965, mayor Robert F. Wagner Jr. announced that he would not run for reelection. Paul R. Screvane, the president of the city council, was favored by Wagner.

=== Results ===
1965 New York City Democratic primary
Party	Candidate	Votes	%
Democratic	Abraham Beame	336,345	44.84%
Democratic	Paul R. Screvane	271,381	36.18%
Democratic	William Fitts Ryan	113,738	15.16%
Democratic	Paul O'Dwyer	28,675	3.82%
Total votes		750,139	100.00%

==== Results by borough ====
1965 Democratic primary
	Manhattan	The Bronx	Brooklyn	Queens	Staten Island	Total
Abraham D. Beame	53,386	66,064	128,146	82,601	6,148	336,345
Paul R. Screvane	66,444	54,260	79,485	63,680	7,512	271,381
William F. Ryan	48,744	16,632	24,588	22,570	1,204	113,738
Paul O'Dwyer	6,771	5,976	8,332	6,895	697	28,675
						750,139

== Republican primary ==
=== Candidates ===
- John Lindsay, U.S. Representative from the Upper East Side of Manhattan

==== Declined ====
- Jacob Javits, U.S. Senator since 1957

== Liberal nomination ==
The Liberals viewed Screvane as uninspiring, Beame was a member of a Brooklyn political machine, Frank D. O'Connor was a conservative ally, and O'Dwyer was the brother of the party's old political enemy William O'Dwyer. Members of the party liked Ryan, but viewed him as unlikely to win the Democratic nomination.

Alex Rose considered having the party nominate Lindsay even before Wagner's withdrawal. Rose met with Robert Price and Price said that Rose agreed to support Lindsay in exchange for one-third of the mayoral appointments, money for the Liberal campaign, and a citywide Liberal candidate. Lindsay accepted the demand, but was upset with how unethical Price was.

Luigi Antonini opposed giving the party's nomination to a Republican, stating that it would hurt the Democrats nationally and split progressives. The convention voted 800 to 50 to endorse Lindsay. Timothy Costello, the chair of the Liberal Party, and Milton Mollen received the Liberal and Republican nominations for city council president and comptroller.

== Conservative candidate ==
The campaign of William F. Buckley Jr. -- heir, conservative activist, syndicated columnist, and editor of the political magazine National Review -- has been called "a bizarre but memorable chapter of the city’s political history". Buckley has been described as entered the 1965 race on the Conservative Party of New York State ticket "on a lark" (historian Jennifer Burns); to split the Republican vote and defeat (liberal) John Lindsay, whom Buckley reportedly "loathed" (Louis Menand); or more generally to undermine the liberal leadership of the New York Republican party (such as Jacob Javits and Nelson Rockefeller) and bring the party in line with the more conservative national "mainstream" of Republican opinion (Sam Tanenhaus).

Buckley took little time off from his other pursuits to campaign for mayor and was initially criticized by some for not being serious enough. However, in the four televised campaign debates he came across as a civil and witty change-of-pace from the two cliché and attack-driven veteran politicians (Lindsay and Beame), and "more fun to listen to than most professional comedians". At the same time he appealed to angry outer-borough, white-skinned, blue-collar, non-WASP (White Anglo-Saxon Protestants) voters known as "white ethnics", with calls for law and order and attacks on liberal policies such as welfare spending.

As the campaign went on, Buckley was shown polling as high as 20% and appeared to be diverting votes from the Democrat Beame, rather than liberal Lindsay. In the end he captured over 13% of the vote, helping Lindsay win, making himself "famous", and foreshadowing the conservative Reagan coalition that would cleanse the Republican party of liberals like Lindsay and Nelson Rockefeller.

== General election ==
=== Candidates ===
- Vito Battista, perennial candidate (United Taxpayers)
- Abraham Beame, New York City Comptroller (Democratic and Civil Service)
- William F. Buckley Jr., author and columnist (Conservative)
- Clifton DeBerry, activist and candidate for President of the United States in 1964 (Socialist Workers)
- Eric Haas, perennial candidate (Socialist Labor)
- John Lindsay, U.S. Representative from the Upper East Side (Republican, Liberal and Independent)

=== Campaign ===
The Liberals pressured President Lyndon B. Johnson to not become involved in the election and David Dubinsky wrote to him about how the American Labor Party endorsed both Democratic Franklin D. Roosevelt and Republican Fiorello La Guardia. Vice President Hubert Humphrey and U.S. Senator Robert F. Kennedy campaigned for Beame, but Johnson only gave him a late endorsement.

The Liberals spent $300,000 during the campaign.

=== Endorsements ===
Beame endorsements

Federal officials

- Lyndon B. Johnson, 36th President of the United States
Lindsay endorsements

Notable individuals

- Ed Koch, Greenwich Village Democratic leader

=== Results ===
The number of votes Lindsay received on the Liberal ballot line was greater than his margin of victory.

Almost a quarter of Lindsay's vote (281,796) was on the Liberal Party ticket, while 63,590 of Beame's votes were on the Civil Service ticket.

1969 New York City mayoral election
Party	Candidate	Votes	%	±%
Republican	John Lindsay		%	
Liberal	John Lindsay	281,796	11.03%	▲2.32
Independent	John Lindsay		%	
Total	John Lindsay	1,149,106	44.99%	N/A
Democratic	Abraham Beame	983,109	38.49%	▲1.11
Civil Service	Abraham Beame	63,590	2.49%	N/A
Total	Abraham Beame	1,046,699	40.98%	N/A
Conservative	William F. Buckley	341,226	13.36%	N/A
United Taxpayers	Vito Battista	11,104	0.43%	▼0.39
Socialist Workers	Clifton DeBerry	3,977	0.16%	▼0.13
Socialist Labor	Eric Haas	2,087	0.08%	▼0.06
Total votes		2,554,199	100.00%	

==== Results by borough ====
Lindsay carried Manhattan, Queens, and traditionally Republican Staten Island, while Beame carried The Bronx and his home borough of Brooklyn, both of which he had also won in the Democratic primary. However, while Beame had also carried Queens in the primary, he lost it to Lindsay in the general election.

1965 General Election	party	Manhattan	The Bronx	Brooklyn	Queens	Richmond [Staten Is.]	Total	%
John V. Lindsay	Republican - Liberal - Independent Citizens	291,326	181,072	308,398	331,162	37,148	1,149,106	45.0%
John V. Lindsay	Republican - Liberal - Independent Citizens	55.8%	39.5%	40.0%	47.1%	45.8%	1,149,106	45.0%
Abraham Beame	Democratic - Civil Service Fusion	193,230	213,980	365,360	250,662	23,467	1,046,699	41.0%
Abraham Beame	Democratic - Civil Service Fusion	37.0%	46.6%	47.4%	35.6%	28.9%	1,046,699	41.0%
William F. Buckley, Jr.	Conservative	37,694	63,858	97,679	121,544	20,451	341,226	13.4%
William F. Buckley, Jr.	Conservative	7.2%	13.9%	12.7%	17.3%	25.2%	341,226	13.4%
subtotal		522,250	458,910	771,437	703,368	81,066	2,537,031	99.4%
others							17,168	0.6%
T O T A L							2,554,199	

== Works cited ==
- Soyer, Daniel (2021). Left in the Center: The Liberal Party of New York and the Rise and Fall of American Social Democracy. Cornell University Press. ISBN 9781501759888. JSTOR 10.7591/j.ctv1hw3x50.2.
