= Robert Price (attorney) =

American lawyer

Robert Price (August 27, 1932– April 22, 2016) was an American attorney, investment banker and corporate executive. A strategist and campaign manager for John V. Lindsay and Nelson Rockefeller, Price served as deputy mayor of New York City before entering business. He founded Price Communications in 1981.

== Early life and education ==
Price was born in Morris Heights in the Bronx on August 27, 1932. His parents were Eastern European Jewish immigrants who ran a grocery store in the Washington Heights section of Manhattan.

Price graduated from the Bronx High School of Science and, in 1950, New York University. He graduated from Columbia Law School, and while a law student worked in the legal department of Macy's.

== Career in politics and government ==
After graduating from law school, Price entered private practice with future congressman Theodore R. Kupferman.

In 1958, Price — then a member of The New York Young Republican Club — managed the first congressional campaign waged by John V. Lindsay on the Upper East Side, in which Lindsay ran against the candidate of the party organization. Price then managed Lindsay's successful campaigns for reelection in 1960, 1962, and 1964. In the latter election, Lindsay was reelected despite Republican presidential nominee Barry Goldwater's landslide defeat by Lyndon B. Johnson.

Also in 1964, Price managed the campaign of New York Governor Nelson Rockefeller in the Republican party presidential primary in Oregon. Rockefeller initially ran fourth in polls, but under Price's guidance surged to a surprise primary victory in the state. Rockefeller asked Price to work on the presidential primary in California, but Lindsay declined to authorize Price to do so.

Price then managed Lindsay's successful 1965 mayoral race. Price then served as deputy mayor of New York City under Lindsay, becoming (at age 33) the city's youngest deputy mayor. Price's portfolio was operations. Although his tenure was short (just over one year), Price was involved in a number of important events, including the negotiated ending to the thirteen-day 1966 New York City transit strike, the enactment of a New York City income tax, and "increased financial concessions from the Port Authority of New York and New Jersey in return for approval of a World Trade Center downtown." Price also killed a proposal by Robert Moses to construct an eight-lane Lower Manhattan Expressway, which would connect the Holland Tunnel to the Manhattan Bridge and Williamsburg Bridge.

== Career in business ==
After leaving city government, Price entered the private sector. He was the founder and president of Price Communications Corp., creating the company in 1979 but activating it two years later, when the company obtained capital. By 1985, Price Communications Corp. owned and operated three television stations and eleven radio stations. In the same year, Price Communications made its first print acquisition when it purchased the New York Law Journal and its companion publication, the National Law Journal, from SFN Companies, for $20.5 million.

Price was also the president of the White Plains-based PriCellular Corp., which he founded in 1992. He ran the company jointly with his son, Steven Price; the elder Price becoming chairman and the younger Price became president and chief executive. The company went public in late 1994 and was acquired by American Cellular Corp. in 1998.

In addition to his work at Price Communications and ProCellular, Price was also executive vice president of Dreyfus Corp. (an investment management company) and general counsel of Lazard Freres & Co. (a financial management firm). He joined Lazard Freres in 1972.

== Death ==
Price died on April 22, 2016, in Manhattan, of a brain hemorrhage.

== Sources cited ==
- Smith, Richard Norton (2014). On His Own Terms: A Life of Nelson Rockefeller (1st ed.). New York: Random House. ISBN 978-0-375-50580-5
