= Brooklyn Democratic Party =

Affiliate of the Democratic Party in New York City

Kings County Democratic County Committee
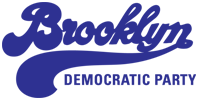
- Chairperson: Nydia Velázquez
- Interim Executive Director: Priscilla Chery
- Headquarters: Brooklyn, NY
- Ideology: Modern American liberalism Progressivism
- National affiliation: Democratic Party
- Colors: Blue
- New York State Assembly (Brooklyn Seats): 17 / 21
- New York State Senate (Brooklyn Seats): 9 / 10
- Citywide Executive Offices: 3 / 3
- New York City Council (Brooklyn Seats): 12 / 15

Website
- brooklyndems.com

The Brooklyn Democratic Party, officially the Kings County Democratic County Committee, is the county committee of the Democratic Party in the New York City borough of Brooklyn (Kings County). It is the most local level of party governance in New York. Kings County Democratic County Committee is one of the largest Democratic county organizations in the United States, and the largest that is not its own city.

In New York, county executive committees typically select candidates for local public offices, with the county committees ratifying the selections, including judicial candidates and the Democratic Party's nominee in special elections.

A vast number of county committee seats are left unfilled, undermining broad participation in county decision-making.

== Structure ==
The New York Election Law defines the structure of political parties and requires each party to have county committees. County committees are composed of at least two members elected from each election district, and in New York City assembly district leaders, elected at the primary for each assembly district or part of an assembly district, are automatically members. Leadership of the party is held by the Chairman of the Executive Committee, voted on by the State Committee members (who collectively form the Executive Committee). Chairmen are known colloquially as "Brooklyn Boss" or "Party Boss."

Every two years, Democrats in each assembly district elect two district leaders: one male, one female. In principle, county committee members select the county committee chair, but in New York City the practice is that the district leaders control the choice. The district leaders and chair make up the executive committee of the county committee. There are 21 assembly districts in Brooklyn, so when all seats are filled, the executive committee has 42 members. Each election district is made up of a small number of city blocks. Each election district has 2 to 4 seats in the general membership of the county committee, so when all the seats are filled, there are approximately 3000 members.

As of 2005, Brooklyn was home to 929,459 enrolled Democrats. There are approximately 10,000 seats on the County Committee, nearly half of which are typically unfilled. There are 42 elected State Committee members (who also function as assembly district leaders), a male and female for each assembly district in the county, two of each in more populous districts. The Executive Committee is composed of the State Committee members from Brooklyn along with the elected officers of the County Committee.

== Criticism and controversies ==
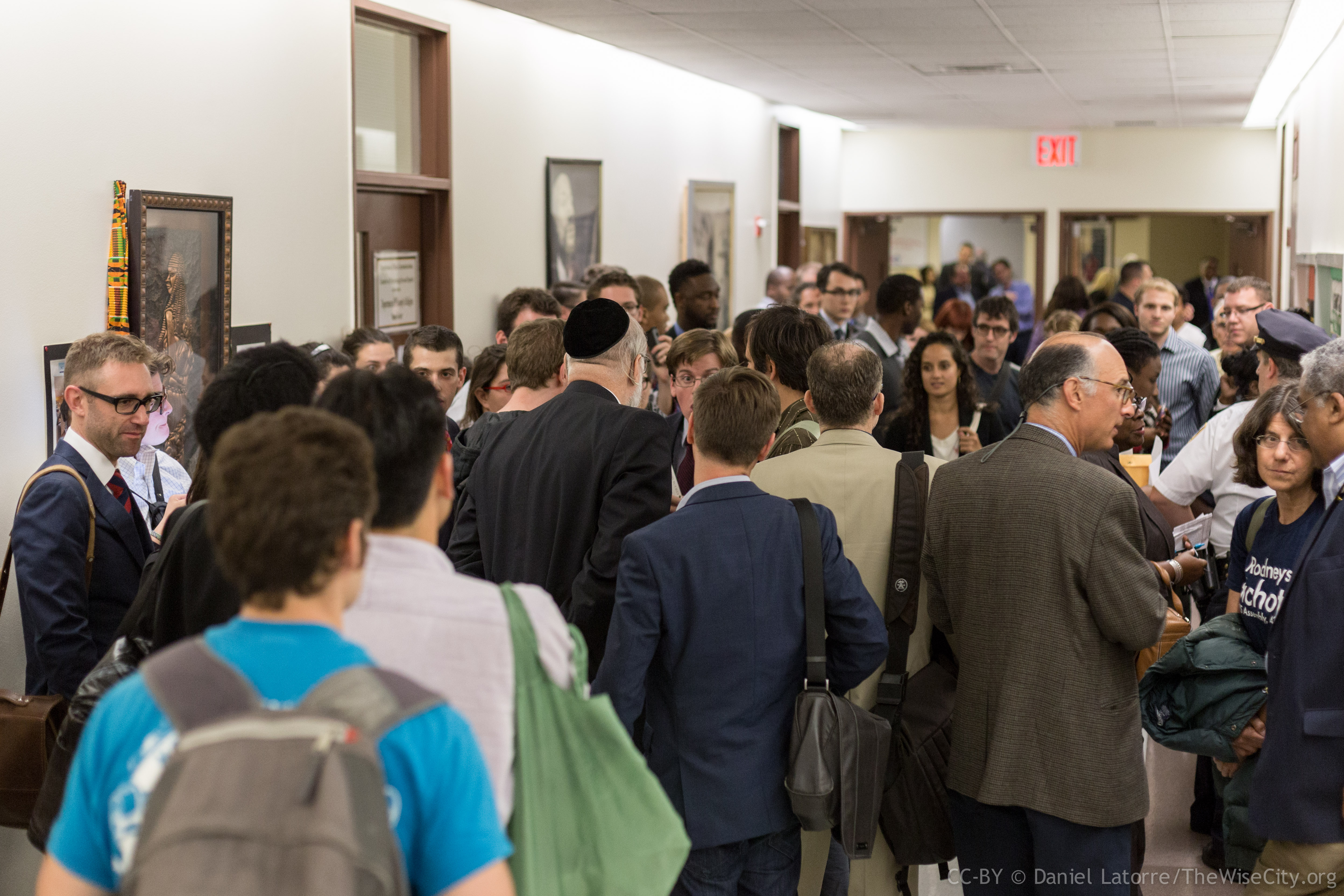
A demonstration outside a September 2014 meeting

A 2005 study by the Grassroots Initiative found that in New York City more than 50% of all county committee seats were vacant and that 98% of committee member elections were uncontested.

Although New York's judicial nominating conventions have been criticized as opaque, brief and dominated by county party leaders, critics claim that in heavily Democratic Brooklyn, party control is extreme. While voters choose delegates to the judicial nominating conventions which pick New York Supreme Court judges, the powerful Democratic machine usually controls the delegates, which critics say gives the party almost virtual control over judge selection.

=== #RepYourBlock ===
In 2016 a campaign titled #RepYourBlock was led by New Kings Democrats, in collaboration with other Brooklyn political clubs, local progressive politicians and candidates, and everyday citizens, to help reform-minded Democratic voters run for County Committee.

=== 2016 reform attempt ===
In September 2016 at the first county committee meeting of the new term, the Kings County Democratic County Committee blocked a vote on a set of ethics and transparency amendments to the governing rules proposed by reform activists. The reform amendments were proposed by Brooklyn reform clubs the New Kings Democrats, Prospect Heights Democrats for Reform, and Southern Brooklyn Democrats with the main objectives of:

1. Increasing transparency in Executive Committee decision-making processes like the nomination of judges
2. Strengthening party ethics to disallow public officials who have been convicted of public malfeasance from being supported by the party
3. Broadening participation by limiting the use of proxy votes and allowing for resolutions to be distributed via email and posting on the party website

The proposed reforms were motioned for a vote as five separate amendments to the party rules by committee members. The amendments were motioned for review by the party's executive committee instead of being afforded an up or down vote by the county committee's members. In response to the absence of a committee vote on the proposed reforms, the auditorium erupted into chants of "Reform Now!" followed by impassioned pleas by county committee members to the borough leadership. The general county committee meeting was ended abruptly and prior to the completion of full agenda.

Kings County Party chairman Frank Seddio, who replaced disgraced late Assemblyman Vito Lopez, promised a review of the progressive reforms by a committee made up of members of his choosing.

=== 2020s ===
In January 2020, Rodneyse Bichotte Hermelyn was chosen to succeed Frank Seddio as Brooklyn Democratic Party Chair. In August 2022, a closed-door meeting of the Brooklyn Democratic Party Executive Committee voted to consolidate power in her hands, where the Committee passed several rule changes meant to blunt the ability of the newly-elected County Committee reformist bloc to enact democratizing reforms.

In December 2020, during the height of the COVID-19 Pandemic, newly elected county leader Rodneyse Bichotte Hermelyn oversaw a contentious organizational meeting of the Kings County Democratic County Committee that stretched for roughly 26 hours over two days and prompted legal challenges from reform-oriented district leaders and clubs over party rules, vacancy appointments, and the handling of proxy votes.

In November 2023, Chair Bichotte Hermelyn was accused of undermining the re-election campaign of Democratic candidate and City Council Member Justin Brannan in a hotly contested Southern Brooklyn election where Republicans have claimed victories in recent years.

In February 2026, Rodneyse Bichotte Hermelyn and a few District Leaders rescinded its endorsement of Governor Kathy Hochul ahead of the New York State Democratic Convention after Hochul selected former New York City Council Speaker Adrienne Adams as her running mate for lieutenant governor. The county organization’s statement criticized the governor’s decision as a “political miscalculation” and faulted her for not consulting Brooklyn party leaders before making the announcement. Party chair Rodneyse Bichotte Hermelyn argued that the choice could hurt Democrats in down-ballot races, while several district leaders and local elected officials publicly opposed the move and called for greater transparency and noted that there was no official vote to rescind the endorsement. After backlash from within the party and from prominent Brooklyn Democrats who continued to back Hochul and Adams, the county organization later moved to reaffirm its support for the Democratic statewide ticket before the general election.

==== Brooklyn Can't Wait and 2026 restructuring ====
In the state primary election held on June 23, 2026, 22 candidates aligned with the "Brooklyn Can't Wait" reformer slate won a majority of the party's committee seats. On July 17, 2026, it was announced the incoming committee members had agreed to support district leader Julio Peña III as chair against Bichotte Hermelyn in leadership elections to be held in September 2026.

In August 2026, Bichotte Hermelyn proposed expanding executive committee voting to unelected county committee delegates. The move was viewed as "power grab" to keep the Brooklyn Can't Wait slate from voting for Peña and instead preserving Bichotte Hermelyn as chair. Governor Kathy Hochul, mayor Zohran Mamdani, attorney general Letitia James, U.S. Senate Minority Leader Chuck Schumer, House Minority Leader Hakeem Jeffries and New York State Democratic Party chair Jay Jacobs among others publicly came out against the plan. On August 25, district leaders, including all lame duck district leaders who had lost their primaries to Brooklyn Can't Wait candidates, narrowly voted to approve the expansion.

On September 14th, New York Supreme Court justice Jill Epstein struck down the proposed rule change and expansion, finding the vote was "improper" and its results null and void. On September 29th, an apellate court affirmed the ruling.

In early October, New York Supreme Court justice Lisa Lewis ruled that Bichotte Hermelyn's term ended on September 23rd when party leadership neglected to put a candidate on the ballot during an organizational meeting, finding that U.S. Representative Nydia Velázquez was the party's interim chair after the meeting.

During an October 4 virtual meeting, assemblymember Nikki Lucas was voted chair of the party by Bichotte Hermelyn and several allies despite a temporary restraining order blocking the party from any votes on a new chair. The party then announced Lucas as its chair the following day. Lawyers for the reformers filed to pursue contempt of court charges against the vote's participants and her election was thrown out on November 10.

== History ==
Democratic politics in Brooklyn have long been fractious, "between regulars and reformers and along ethnic and then racial lines." However, the tension between "regulars" and "reformers" has always been somewhat fluid, as past bosses have acknowledged. "Today's reformer is tomorrow's hack," party boss Meade Esposito is reputed to have said, and later boss Clarence Norman echoed those sentiments, once asserting "When you're on the outside, you're a reformer; when you're on the inside, you're a regular. Let's be for real."

Corruption has been an issue in the party, as four of five party bosses (Steingut, Esposito, Norman, and Lopez) were investigated or indicted on corruption charges (in the case of Steingut, after leaving office). For example, in 2003, Supreme Court Judge Gerald Garson, the treasurer of the Kings County Democratic County Committee, was indicted for bribery.

The party boss in Brooklyn was for most of the 20th century a figure of national influence and power; however, that influence has waned. Former boss Vito Lopez has been described as "one of the last of the city's political kingmakers."

== List of chairpersons since the 20th century ==
After 1990, the New York City Charter banned party chairs from simultaneously hold a county or city office. This resulted in Howard Golden relinquishing his party office to remain Brooklyn Borough President. Those holding state offices are still eligible.

In 2026 Nydia Velázquez was recognized as the legitimate interim chairperson by Supreme Court judge Lisa Lewis. Following this, Nikki Lucas was elected chairperson by a faction loyal to outgoing chairperson Rodneyse Bichotte Hermelyn. Both Velázquez and Lucas are listed as "disputed" below with the date of their claimed appointments as the beginning of their term. On November 10, Supreme Court Justice Sweeney threw out the October 4 election of Nikki Lucas.

| Name (with years of birth & death) | Term beginning | Term end |
|---|---|---|
| Hugh McLaughlin (1827–1904) | 1870 (ca.) | 1903 |
| Patrick H. McCarren (1849–1909) | 1903 | October 23, 1909 (death) |
| John H. McCooey (1864–1934) | November 12, 1909 | January 21, 1934 (death) |
| Thomas F. Wogan, Francis J. Sinnott, Frank V. Kelly (committee) | February 26, 1934 | September 24, 1934 |
| Frank V. Kelly (1880–1946) | September 24, 1934 | July 5, 1946 (death) |
| John Cashmore (1895–1961) | August 10, 1946 | July 28, 1950 |
| Francis J. Sinnott (c. 1891–1956) | July 28, 1950 | December 29, 1952 |
| Kenneth F. Sutherland (1888–1954) | December 29, 1952 | April 8, 1954 |
| Joseph T. Sharkey (1893–1991) | April 8, 1954 | January 18, 1962 |
| John J. Lynch, Aaron L. Jacoby, Gardner C. Taylor (committee) | January 18, 1962 | November 19, 1962 |
| Stanley Steingut (1920–1989) | November 19, 1962 | January 10, 1969 |
| Meade Esposito (1907–1993) | January 10, 1969 | January 25, 1984 |
| Howard Golden (1925–2024) | January 25, 1984 | October 29, 1990 |
| Clarence Norman Jr. (1951– ) | October 29, 1990 | September 28, 2005 |
| Vito J. Lopez (1941–2015) | October 20, 2005 | August 28, 2012 |
| Frank R. Seddio (1946– ) | September 19, 2012 | January 15, 2020 |
| Rodneyse Bichotte Hermelyn (1972– ) | January 20, 2020 | September 23, 2026 |
| Nydia Velázquez (1953– ), | September 23, 2026 | |

== See also ==
- Community boards of Brooklyn
- Government and politics in Brooklyn
- Elections in New York
- Politics of New York City
