= Meade Esposito =

American politician (1907–1993)

- Photo of Meade Esposito by Ken Regan

Personal details
- Born: Amadeo Henry Esposito; 1907 Brooklyn, New York, U.S.
- Died: September 3, 1993 (aged 86) Manhasset, New York, U.S.
- Party: Democratic
- Children: 1
- Profession: Brooklyn Democratic leader

Amadeo Henry "Meade" Esposito (1907 – September 3, 1993) was an American politician who served as chairman of the Kings County Democratic Committee from 1969 to 1984. He was a prominent Democratic Party leader in Brooklyn and was widely regarded as a political boss. His tenure was characterized by the use of a citywide patronage network, which became associated with multiple municipal corruption scandals.

Following the election of Ed Koch as mayor in 1977, Esposito emerged as one of the most influential political figures in New York City. Although Koch’s political background was rooted in the Manhattan-based Reform Democrat movement, Esposito’s support was considered instrumental in the outcome, though it was not publicly emphasized. Critics described Esposito as wielding authority comparable to that of a feudal leader surrounded by loyal subordinates. His network extended across boroughs and included Bronx leaders Stanley M. Friedman, Stanley Simon, and Ramon S. Velez; Brooklyn legislators Stanley Fink and Anthony J. Genovesi; Queens Borough President Donald Manes; Brooklyn Borough President Howard Golden; United States Representatives Shirley Chisholm, Leo C. Zeferetti, and Fred Richmond; lawyer Roy Cohn; real estate developers Fred and Donald Trump; and American Mafia figures including Anthony Scotto and Paul Vario.

Although a central figure in the “Regular Democrat” tradition of machine politics, Esposito identified as a political liberal, in marked contrast to many of his successors. He supported George McGovern in the 1972 United States presidential election and frequently praised Eleanor Roosevelt. He also supported New York City’s first proposed LGBTQ rights bill in the 1970s. As the apex of his power coincided with historic population declines in New York stemming from decades-long white flight, Esposito moved beyond his white ethnic base in southeastern Brooklyn to collaborate with leaders of nascent African American and Hispanic and Latino American communities throughout the borough, such as City Councilman Samuel D. Wright and his successor, Enoch H. Williams.

By the early 1980s, several Brooklyn-based elected officials with national ambitions—most notably Kings County District Attorney Elizabeth Holtzman, liberal internationalist Representative Steve Solarz and future Senate Majority Leader Chuck Schumer—had either directly repudiated or distanced themselves from Esposito's influence, although Jack Newfield and Wayne Barrett reported that Schumer met publicly with Esposito for lunch on at least one occasion.

In 1983, investigations into his activities mounted; this, along with a thwarted leadership challenge from erstwhile protege Genovesi (who Esposito believed had been "openly salivating" for his departure) would prompt his retirement in January 1984. Three years later, he was convicted of giving an illegal gratuity in the United States District Court for the Eastern District of New York, having given Bronx Representative Mario Biaggi a spa vacation in Florida. As a result of this and related scandals (including Manes' suicide and Friedman's conviction on federal corruption charges) amid the political emergence of reform-minded rivals David Dinkins and Rudy Giuliani, the Esposito machine effectively collapsed. During this period, several fledgling African American politicians also withdrew their support, precipitating the 1990 election of Clarence Norman Jr. as county chairman of what had momentarily descended into a "largely vestigial structure".

Esposito was respected and feared for his street-style management, intimidation tactics and criminal connections. He became known for running politics similar to a junket.

== Early life ==
Amadeo "Meade" Esposito was born in the subsection of Ocean Hill, Brooklyn (alternatively characterized as part of Bedford-Stuyvesant or Brownsville) in 1907. He was the son of Giuseppe and Felicia Esposito. His grandfather came to America from Italy in 1885. His father followed his grandfather in 1900 and arrived in America at the age of 18. Giuseppe became a saloon owner. Meade lived with his two sisters above the saloon and claimed to have started working as a child.

Esposito grew up in Brownsville (then a predominately Jewish neighborhood with smaller Irish and Italian populations) and received his nickname "Meade" during elementary school. He briefly attended Park Slope's Manual Training High School, now known as the John Jay Educational Campus, but dropped out at the age of 14. He married at the age of 18 and became a father by 19.

Despite his dearth of formal education, colleagues lauded Esposito as a keen autodidact "who read everything from comic books to Plato."

== Politics ==
After dropping out of school, Esposito found employment at an insurance business (a field he would return to throughout his career) operated by Jim Powers, a former United States Marshal and local Democratic leader. There, Esposito met Hyman Schorenstein, another Brooklyn Democratic leader who went on to secure the presidential nomination for Al Smith at the party's 1928 Democratic National Convention. Although Schorenstein was illiterate, his blunt, transactional management style would profoundly influence Esposito. At the age of 18, Esposito "got a couple of dozen of the guys together" and started the Progressive Democratic Club on Fulton Street.

During the Great Depression and the early postwar era, he primarily worked as a beer salesman and bail bondsman. He met many of his future connections through the latter business. Esposito cultivated ethnic and community ties that encouraged more Italian Americans to move into politics. He launched the political career of prominent Brownsville-based haberdasher Abe Stark (who served as New York City Council President from 1954 to 1961 and Borough President of Brooklyn from 1962 to 1970) and assisted in electing longtime New York State Assembly member Alfred Lama, best known for co-founding the Mitchell-Lama Housing Program.

Amid redlining and white flight-driven demographic shifts in Ocean Hill-Brownsville and adjacent East New York throughout the 1950s and 1960s, Esposito's predominantly Italian and Jewish base gradually migrated to southeastern Brooklyn's semi-suburban belt of Canarsie, Flatlands and Mill Basin, culminating in the formation of the gerrymandered 39th Assembly District to represent these constituencies in 1972. As early as 1958, Esposito ran for Democratic district leader in Canarsie on a ticket with co‐leader candidate Shirley Weiner. Although they lost by 200 votes, Esposito was ultimately elected to the post in 1960 after being endorsed by Eleanor Roosevelt and Herbert H. Lehman. During this period, his influence continued to grow in tandem with the Canarsie-based Thomas Jefferson Democratic Club, which served as his primary political base for the remainder of his career.

Throughout the 1960s, Esposito began to personally select many judges and politicians in Brooklyn. From 1960 to 1970, he also served as assistant vice president of the Kings Lafayette Bank (which was subsumed by the Edmond Safra-led Republic New York in 1966) for an indeterminate period of time "despite no apparent experience" in the profession. Jack Newfield would later report that Esposito sought the position to distance himself from his bondsman career to better ensure his political ascension, while "the single biggest depositor in the bank" during his incumbency "was the [Anthony Scotto-affiliated International Longshoremen's Association], which many law enforcement agencies believe is Mafia-dominated [...] It is suspected that the ILA used its influence to get Esposito the job."

Although Esposito attained his longtime goal of becoming chairman of the Kings County Democratic Committee in 1969 as part of a byzantine power-sharing agreement with "sometimes friend and often business partner" Stanley Steingut (who sought to consolidate his control of the New York State Assembly's Democratic caucus in preparation for assuming the speakership), the Jefferson Club's influence was initially overshadowed by the enduring dominance of Steingut's East Flatbush-based James Madison Democratic Club, a predominantly Jewish political clearinghouse for such figures as future New York City Mayor Abe Beame, veteran New York State Comptroller Arthur Levitt Sr., prominent jurist Nat Sobel and members of the Trump family. After Beame lost the mayoralty in 1977, the balance of power in municipal politics gradually shifted to Esposito, with accelerating white flight in East Flatbush and the concomitant death of Steingut organization éminence grise Beadie Markowitz (an Esposito ally for decades because of their mutual roots in the Schorenstein machine) in early 1978 all but assuring the then-Speaker's decisive defeat by Andrew Stein-backed primary challenger Murray Weinstein (later succeeded by his daughter, Helene Weinstein).

Some observers have asserted that Esposito's authority was functionally attenuated throughout this period due to the failed campaigns of several Esposito-Steingut endorsees, including former Administrator of the Small Business Administration Howard J. Samuels (who unsuccessfully sought the 1974 Democratic gubernatorial nomination in a voluble campaign managed by Ken Auletta) and longstanding Washington Senator Henry M. Jackson, a seminal neoconservative who ran for the 1976 Democratic presidential nomination; both were primarily favored by Steingut, with the latter retaining support from the machine for most of the 1976 primary season (mainly due to his advocacy for Israel and opposition to desegregation busing) despite late Madison Club attorney James Harrison Cohen's efforts to campaign for Jimmy Carter, the eventual nominee. As county leader, Esposito became the main interlocutor between the bellicose eastern Brooklyn constituencies and a less visible coterie of high-ranking conservative Democrats in western Brooklyn, including former New York Supreme Court administrative director and longtime Brooklyn Heights/Fort Greene/South Brooklyn district leader James V. Mangano, who was blocked from ascending to the chairmanship of the County Committee by Esposito in 1969; fellow district leader Anthony Caracciolo, whose expansive territory included all or part of such transitional neighborhoods as Park Slope, Sunset Park, Windsor Terrace and Kensington; and Windsor Terrace-based New York City Council Majority Leader Thomas J. Cuite. The unanticipated election of alleged Mangano-Caracciolo proxy Bernard M. Bloom (then leader of the eastern Flatbush-based Andrew Jackson Democratic Club) as Kings County Surrogate (a role charged with overseeing lucrative probate and estate proceedings) in 1976 may have deprived the Esposito-Steingut machine of a key patronage tranche as retribution for the 1969 "coup", although Cohen asserted in his 2019 memoir that Esposito personally "tapped" Bloom to serve in the role after "quietly [supporting]" Hugh Carey, the Mangano-Caracciolo-Bloom faction's successful 1974 gubernatorial candidate.

In the summer of 1979, Esposito was tried for allegedly violating a state law barring New York county political leaders from engaging in business dealings with race tracks. Citing the rules of the Kings County Democratic Committee, New York Supreme Court Justice Alvin Klein ruled that Esposito had not violated the law since he was formally identified as chairman of the Committee's executive subcommittee. According to Ken Auletta, Esposito had previously characterized himself as county leader in a 1976 interview with The New York Times.

By the 1970s, Esposito's legitimate employment had primarily shifted to the proprietorship of at least two lower Manhattan-based insurance brokerages; these included the Grand Brokerage (also known as the Grand Insurance Agency)—a partnership between Esposito, Steingut and prominent Nassau County reform Democratic leader Lester Zirin—and Serres, Visone, & Rice, a similar venture between Esposito and former Brooklyn Heights/Fort Greene/South Brooklyn Assemblyman Joseph Martuscello that functioned as Esposito's main business for the remainder of his life. Esposito and Martuscello also co-owned several properties, including a Carroll Gardens brownstone, a villa in a Fort Lauderdale resort and a 50-foot yacht. Esposito's involvement in the former concern appears to have faded following a 1974-75 investigation of money laundering and organized crime involvement in the city's nursing home industry; it was ultimately dissolved amid Steingut's pursuit of a Manhattan legal career in 1982. In press interviews, Esposito noted that he was "not a broker" at either firm, claiming that he instead served as a "stockholder" and "more of an administrator." During the 1980s, he also owned a stake in Beaumont Offset Printing, a printing firm ran by his daughter that was contracted by various New York political campaigns.

Esposito elicited a variety of perceptions from his peers. While Robert F. Wagner Jr. called him a "new breed of party leader", Herman Badillo, a critic of Esposito, called him "an old-line boss". During his tenure as county leader, his connections to known Mafia members and associates had become common knowledge. He grew up alongside many of these figures, who continued to retain him during his years as a bail bondsman. In 1972, during a federal investigation into the Lucchese crime family, Esposito's name was frequently mentioned in a bugged junkyard trailer used as an office by Paul Vario.

Politicians traded favors and gifts with Esposito for political influence and positions, a process that greatly accelerated after he became New York City's preeminent political boss in 1978. By 1983, investigations into his increasingly conspicuous activities were growing. Despite claiming he would never retire, Esposito left his position as leader of the Kings County Democratic Committee in January 1984, unexpectedly leaving the position to incumbent Brooklyn Borough President Howard Golden amid internal conflict with former protege Anthony Genovesi.

Nevertheless, Esposito continued to retain significant surreptitious influence in New York City politics after his retirement. In the fall of 1985, during an FBI investigation into the Genovese crime family, Esposito was heard speaking with lifelong friend Federico "Fritzy" Giovanelli, a caporegime in the organization. This led to a direct wiretap of Esposito's phone.

Later in 1985, Esposito was recorded speaking with Mario Biaggi, claiming to have "made" 42 judges in Brooklyn. Biaggi was charged in 1987 with taking an unlawful gratuity, having accepted a free $3,200 vacation in Florida from Esposito. Prosecutors said it was in exchange for using his influence to help a ship-repair company that was a major client of Serres, Visone, & Rice. The defense said it was given out of friendship, and no favors were done in return. While Biaggi was acquitted of both bribery and conspiracy, he was convicted of accepting an illegal gratuity and obstruction of justice, sentenced to two-and-a-half years in prison, and fined $500,000. Esposito received a suspended sentence. Esposito was put on probation, sentenced to community service and fined $500,000.

In 1989, Esposito faced additional charges of bribery and tax fraud; however a federal judge determined Esposito was too sick and elderly to maintain a proper defense.

== Personal life ==
Esposito was known for his "blunt, warm and earthy" nature. He frequently smoked cigars and kept a baseball bat under his desk to symbolically enforce power. Donald Trump, whose family's real estate business frequently interlocked with elements of the Brooklyn Democratic machine, respected Esposito and his management style. Esposito had a daughter, Phyllis.

At the height of his power, Esposito primarily resided at 2600 National Drive, a waterfront property in Mill Basin. He also maintained a residence in Quogue, New York. In 1987, he moved his principal residence to Manhasset, New York.

While serving as county leader, Esposito eschewed written memoranda and held important meetings in the basement of his mother's Canarsie house to evade potential wiretaps at his Downtown Brooklyn office and Mill Basin home. The elder Esposito usually prepared homemade meatballs for her guests.

=== Death ===
In the early 1990s, Esposito developed bladder and lung cancer. He died of a blood infection at North Shore University Hospital in Manhasset on September 3, 1993.

Party political offices
| Preceded by Stanley Steingut | Chairman of the Kings County Democratic Committee; 1969–1984 | Succeeded by Howard Golden |
