= Howard Golden =

American politician (1925–2024)

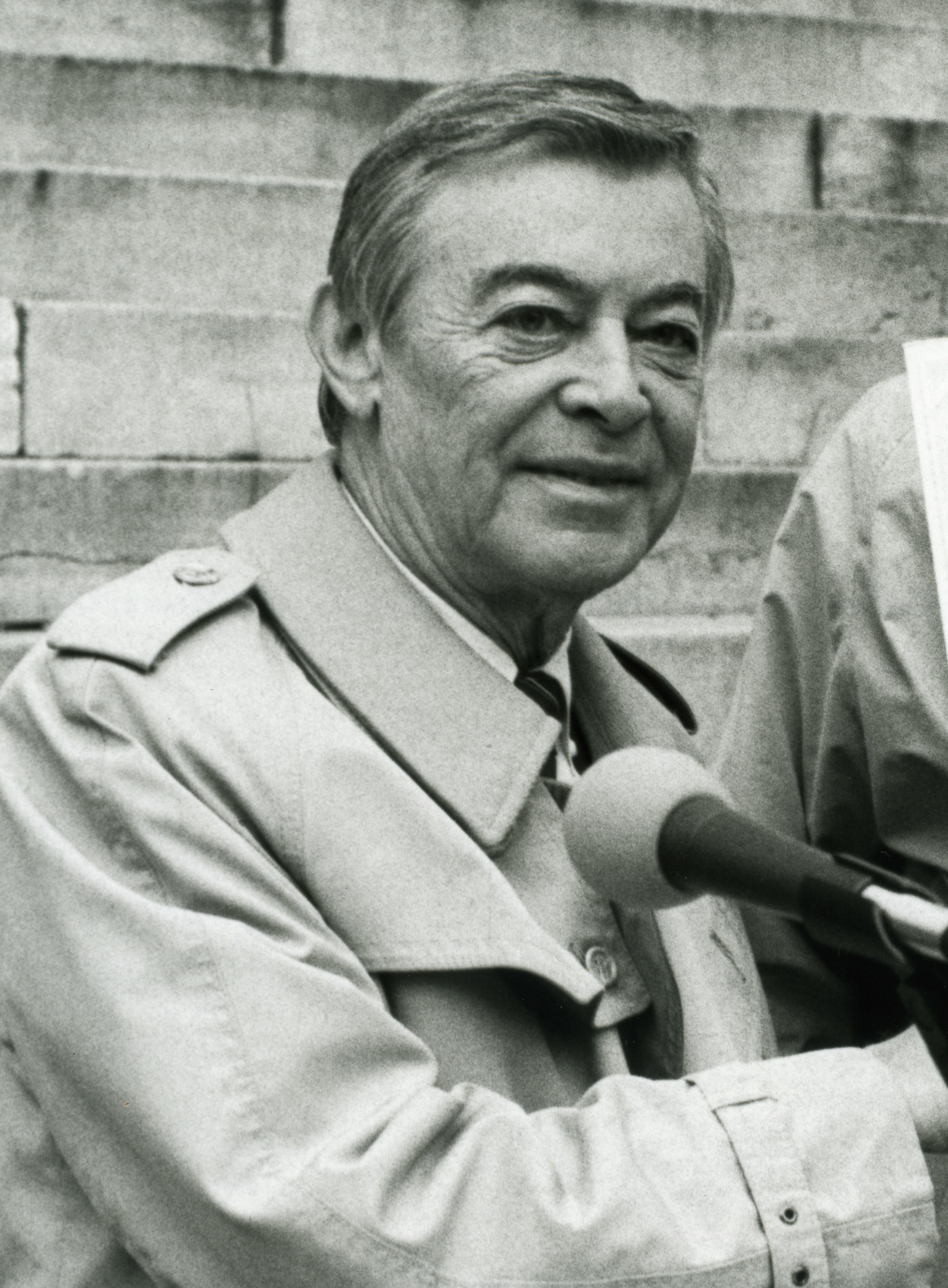
- Golden in 1996

16th Borough President of Brooklyn
- In office January 3, 1977 – December 31, 2001
- Preceded by: Sebastian Leone
- Succeeded by: Marty Markowitz

Personal details
- Born: November 6, 1925 Flatbush, Brooklyn, U.S.
- Died: January 24, 2024 (aged 98) Brooklyn, New York, U.S.
- Party: Democratic
- Spouse: Aileen Wolsky
- Education: New York University; Brooklyn Law School
- Profession: Lawyer, Politician

Howard Golden (November 6, 1925 – January 24, 2024) was an American lawyer and politician in the Democratic Party who served as the borough president of Brooklyn from January 3, 1977, to December 31, 2001. He concurrently served as chairman of the Brooklyn Democratic Party from January 1984 to October 1990. Golden also served on the New York City Council from 1970 until 1976.

== Early life and education ==
Howard Golden was born to a Jewish family in Flatbush, Brooklyn, on November 6, 1925. His father, Jack, owned a delicatessen that ultimately burned down; thereafter, the elder Golden worked at the Brooklyn Navy Yard. Golden was primarily raised in Hell's Kitchen (along with stints in Bensonhurst and the Navy Yard area) and attended public schools. When his son was 16, Jack Golden died from complications of a head-on collision after falling from a truck at the Navy Yard, forcing Golden's mother to "start a new career doing administrative work for the city’s welfare department."

After graduating from Stuyvesant High School, Golden served as a United States Navy pharmacist's mate during World War II; in this capacity, he was part of the Normandy landings on June 6, 1944. Although he was admitted to Harvard University following the war, he decided to remain in the city to support his family, instead earning his undergraduate degree from New York University on the G.I. Bill in 1950 while working as a men's clothing salesman. He received his LL.B. from Brooklyn Law School in 1953 and was admitted to the New York state bar in 1954.

== Political career ==
In the decade that followed, Golden was an attorney in private practice based out of Downtown Brooklyn's Court Street district, where he first became acquainted with future New York Governor Mario Cuomo and other contemporaries relegated to the implicitly deprecatory "Court Street lawyer" milieu amid enduring discrimination against Jewish and Italian American attorneys at Manhattan white-shoe firms during the epoch.

His political career commenced in earnest when he gained control of the Borough Park-based Roosevelt Democratic Club in 1967 by "organizing a rebellion against the entrenched officials and getting himself elected district leader"; under Golden's aegis, the Roosevelt Club ranked among the foremost Democratic organizations in New York City for several decades, serving as the political home for myriad elected officials, judges, commissioners and municipal patronage employees.

Golden was elected to the New York City Council from a Borough Park and Kensington-based district in November 1969 before being sworn into office in January 1970. (Although Kensington had been characterized as the western section of Flatbush in an official New York City publication as late as 1966, it had recently been placed under the jurisdiction of the Borough Park-based Community Board 12, while a substantial swath of the western section of the community—including Golden's longtime residence—was encompassed by the Roosevelt Club-controlled 48th Assembly District; coupled with Golden customarily being described as a Borough Park-based figure in press accounts, this likely fostered the increased perception of Kensington as a discrete neighborhood in the 1970s and beyond.) He was reelected to a second four-year term in 1974 before resigning from the City Council in December 1976. During his Council service, Golden sponsored 1970 legislation that suspended municipal alternate side of the street parking regulations on state and national holidays and on Judeo-Christian holy days; this enduringly popular exemption has expanded to observances of the Chinese New Year, Eid al-Fitr, Eid al-Adha and Diwali in subsequent decades.

In the November 1976 election, Brooklyn Borough President Sebastian Leone ran for a judicial seat on the New York State Supreme Court (a role then widely considered to be the apogee of a New York City-based political career) instead of running for re-election as borough president. He won, and resigned on December 31 to take his new position. Under the era's statutes, the New York City Council's Brooklyn delegation formally selected Golden to serve as interim borough president until the next election. Golden decided to run for the office in the following election, and in November 1977 he won a four-way race by a wide margin.

While he had served in the nominal second-highest local party role (chairman of the Kings County Democratic county committee) for many years, Golden's January 1984 selection as county leader (a role obliquely designated as chairman of the executive committee of the Kings County Democratic Party) by the retiring Meade Esposito initially vexed many observers because erstwhile Esposito protégé Anthony J. Genovesi (regarded as a "prodigal son" by Esposito because he "openly [salivated]" for his retirement) had been endorsed by Mayor Ed Koch and Assembly Speaker Stanley Fink.

During this period, Golden also served as a member of the New York State Democratic Committee and the Democratic National Committee. He continued to serve as the Borough Park/Kensington Democratic district leader until 1990, when the 1989 New York City Charter's disbandment of the New York City Board of Estimate forced him to choose between the salary and perquisites of the borough presidency (now largely shorn of a policymaking purview) and his financially uncompensated Democratic leadership positions. For the duration of his elected service, Golden maintained that the borough presidents remained an important check on the Manhattan-oriented municipal government: "We're the spokesmen for the boroughs [...] If they did away with the job of borough president, there would be no one to fight for the borough as a whole."

Although he frequently clashed with Koch and his immediate Democratic successor, David Dinkins (1990-1993), over issues running the gamut from "Koch’s policies on building shelters in Brooklyn for the homeless" and his support of Genovesi to the redevelopment of Downtown Brooklyn, Golden remained a key New York powerbroker into the 1990s; many of his protégés achieved higher office through his personal intervention. Golden's first two deputy borough presidents went on to higher office. Edolphus Towns represented various sections of central and eastern Brooklyn in Congress from 1983 to 2013 (culminating in his 2009-2011 chairmanship of the House Oversight Committee), while Bill Thompson was the president of the New York City Board of Education from 1996 to 2001 before serving as the New York City comptroller from 2002 to 2009. In 1983, as borough president, Golden proclaimed March 10 to be an annual "Grand Prospect Hall Day" in Brooklyn.

During Rudy Giuliani's Republican mayoralty (1994-2001), Golden accused the incumbent of favoring Lower Manhattan over Downtown Brooklyn for economic development incentives, and he was especially irate over the mayor's plan to bring professional baseball back to Brooklyn via the Minor League Baseball-based Brooklyn Cyclones, maintaining that "such a team was beneath the dignity of the borough." New York City instituted term limits in 2000, barring Golden from running for reelection in the 2001 elections. While Golden supported Deputy Borough President Jeannette Gadson (who had inherited the Brownsville-based political machine cultivated by her late uncle, Samuel D. Wright) in the ensuing primary, he was eventually succeeded by a longtime greater Flatbush rival, former tenant activist and State Senator Marty Markowitz, despite Markowitz's previous campaign-finance misdemeanor conviction and controversial role in a 1990 Wingate Park concert accident that left Curtis Mayfield paralyzed for the rest of his life.

Immediately thereafter, Brooklyn District Attorney Charles Hynes hired Golden as his office's executive director of civic and governmental affairs. The $125,000-per-year job elicited criticism because of its political elan amid heavy caseloads and departmental layoffs, prompting Golden to resign in September.

== Personal life and death ==
Golden was married to Aileen Wolsky, and the couple had two daughters, Michele and Dana. Golden died on January 24, 2024, at age 98.

== See also ==
- List of borough presidents of New York City
- List of Stuyvesant High School people

New York City Council
Preceded by Julius Moskowitz	New York City Council, 25th District; 1970–1973	Succeeded by Theodore Silverman
Preceded by NEW DISTRICT	New York City Council, 32nd District; 1974–1976	Succeeded by Edward M. Rappaport
Political offices
Preceded by Sebastian Leone	Borough President of Brooklyn; 1977–2001	Succeeded by Marty Markowitz
Party political offices
Preceded by Meade Esposito	Chairman of the Kings County Democratic Committee; 1984–1990	Succeeded by Clarence Norman Jr.
