= Abe Stark =

American businessman and politician

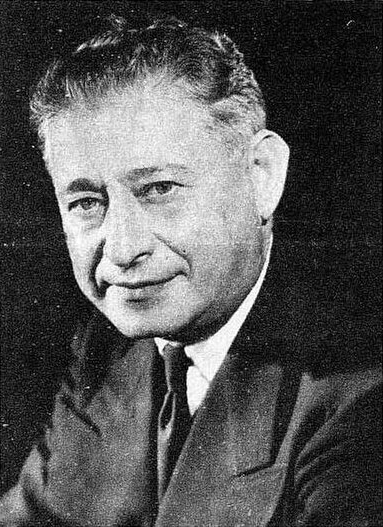
- Stark c. 1949

4th President of the New York City Council
- In office January 1, 1954 – December 31, 1961
- Preceded by: Rudolph Halley
- Succeeded by: Paul R. Screvane

15th Brooklyn Borough President
- In office January 1, 1962 – September 8, 1970
- Preceded by: John F. Hayes
- Succeeded by: Sebastian Leone

Personal details
- Born: September 28, 1894
- Died: July 2, 1972 (aged 77)
- Party: Democratic

Abe Stark (September 28, 1894 – July 2, 1972) was an American businessman and politician. Born on the Lower East Side in New York City, he became a tailor and owned a clothing store at 1514 Pitkin Avenue in the Brownsville section of Brooklyn.

== Brooklyn Dodgers link ==
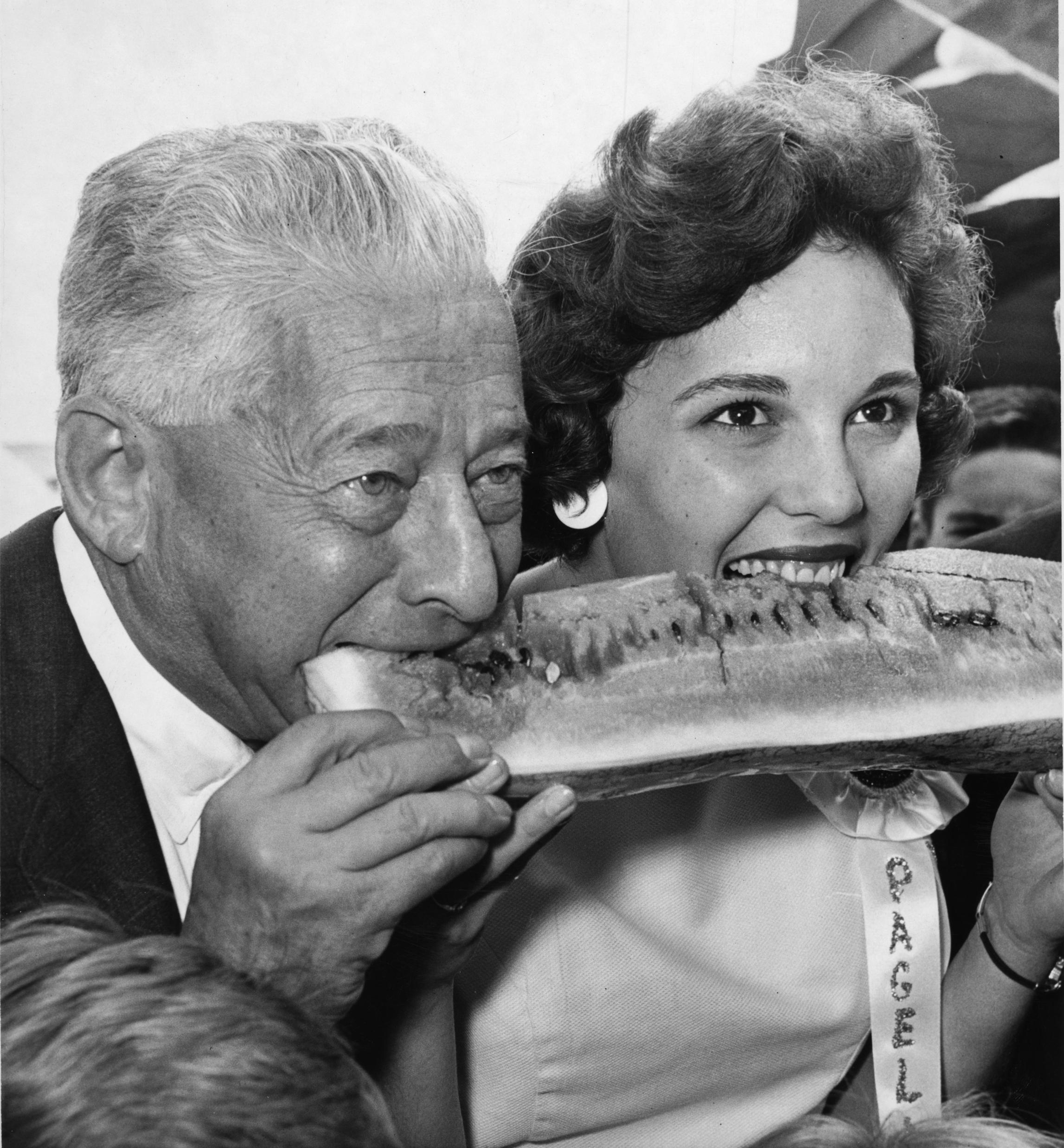
Abe Stark poses with "Watermelon Queen" Mimi Fellers at the Brooklyn Terminal Market

Stark's name first became familiar because of the advertising gimmick for his clothing store, a sign placed directly under the Ebbets Field scoreboard in right-center field in 1931, and seen by millions in movie newsreels and then on television. It announced, "Hit Sign, Win Suit. Abe Stark. 1514 Pitkin Ave. Brooklyn's Leading Clothier." Any player who hit the sign on the fly would get a free suit from his store.

Due to the excellent fielding of Brooklyn Dodgers right fielders Dixie Walker and Carl Furillo, Stark awarded very few suits. It has been said that, as long as the sign was up, the only opposing player to hit it on a fly was Mel Ott of the arch-rival New York Giants, who did it twice. It has also been said that, upon the suggestion of a customer who pointed out how many free suits Furillo saved Stark from having to give away, Stark gave Furillo a free suit. However, according to teammate Duke Snider, Furillo received only a pair of slacks.

The stories about how few players won free suits are probably more legend than truth. Prior to the famous sign, which measured about 3 feet by 30 feet, there was an even larger one that was hit by batted balls much more frequently. Overton Tremper, a reserve outfielder for the Dodgers, recalled that it covered the right field wall from top to bottom and from the foul line to about 150 to right center field, and Murray Rubin, whose father worked in Stark's store for 40 years, said, "Many balls hit the original Stark sign. My father told me that on some evenings, he altered more suits for players than for paying customers."

== Political career ==
Stark became so well known as a result of his sign that he rose through New York City politics and was elected twice as president of the New York City Council, serving in that office from 1954 to 1961, and three times as borough president of Brooklyn, holding that office from 1962 to 1970.

== Legacy ==
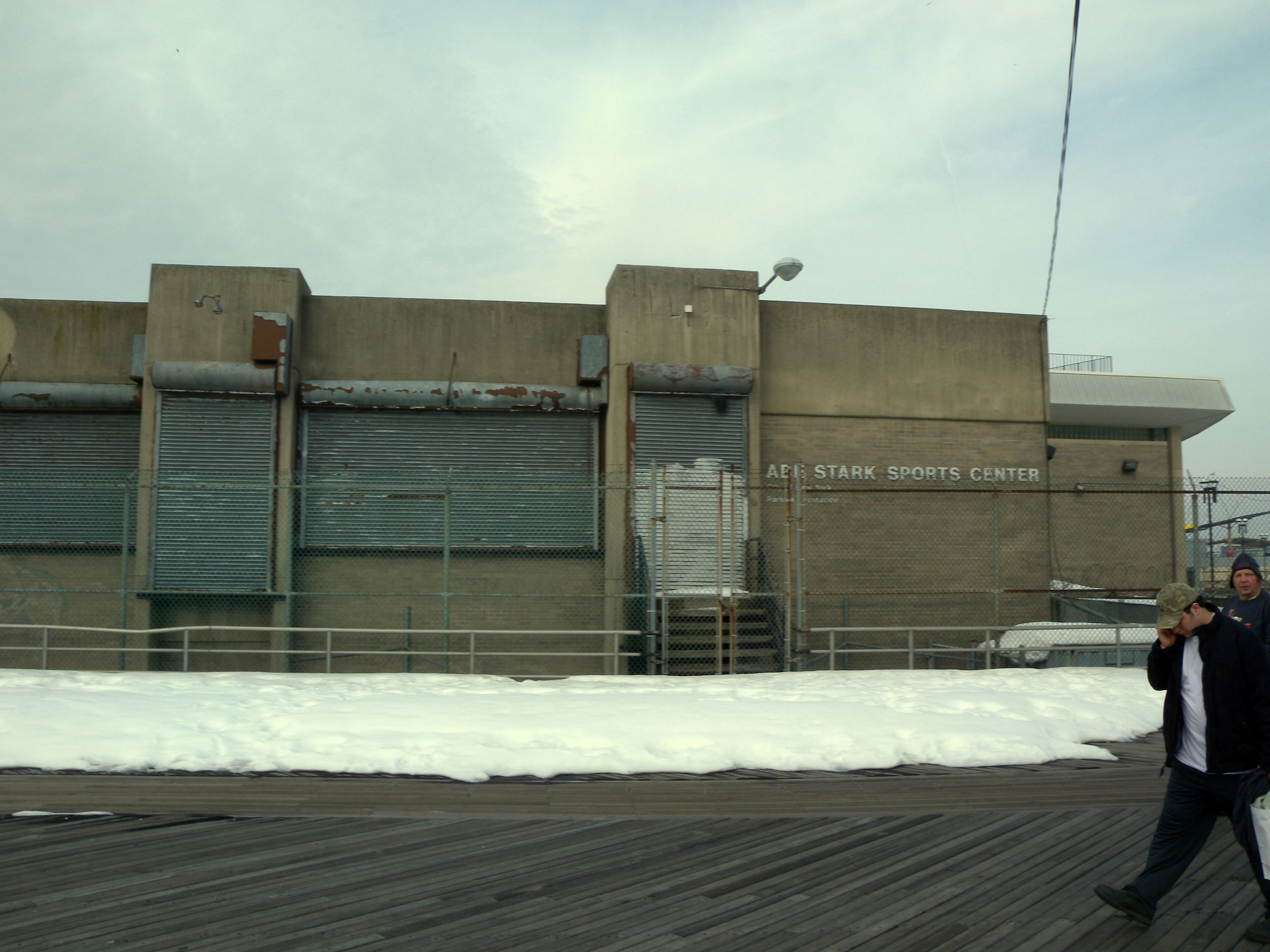
Abe Stark Rink at Coney Island

An ice skating rink on the Riegelmann Boardwalk in Coney Island and an elementary school in Spring Creek, Brooklyn are named after Stark.

Political offices
Preceded by Rudolph Halley	President of the New York City Council; 1954 – 1961	Succeeded by Paul R. Screvane
Preceded by John F. Hayes	Borough President of Brooklyn; 1962 – 1970	Succeeded by Sebastian Leone
