= Paul R. Screvane =

American politician

Paul Rogers Screvane

5th President of the New York City Council
- In office January 1, 1962 – January 1, 1966
- Preceded by: Abe Stark
- Succeeded by: Frank D. O'Connor

25th New York City Commissioner of Sanitation
- In office February 25, 1957 – March 3, 1961
- Preceded by: Andrew W. Mulrain
- Succeeded by: Frank J. Lucia

Personal details
- Born: August 11, 1914 Woodcliffe, New Jersey, U.S.
- Died: November 4, 2001 (aged 87) Wyomissing, Pennsylvania, U.S.
- Party: Democratic
- Education: James Monroe High School

Military service
- Allegiance: United States
- Branch/service: United States Army
- Years of service: 1936–1945
- Rank: Colonel
- Battles/wars: World War II
- Awards: Silver Star; Bronze Star

Paul R. Screvane (August 11, 1914 – November 4, 2001) was an American politician. He served as the commissioner of the New York City Department of Sanitation from 1957 to 1961 and president of the New York City Council from 1962 to 1966. He also ran as a Democratic candidate in the 1965 New York City mayoral election.

== Early life ==
Paul Rogers Screvane was born on August 11, 1914, in Woodcliffe, New Jersey. Three weeks after his birth, his family moved back into their Bronx home, where he grew up. He played football at James Monroe High School at the halfback position. Due to his skill, he earned an athletic scholarship to Mississippi State College. However, his mother became ill and he left college after one year.

== Career ==
Screvane's service to New York City started when he turned 22, when he took a job as a garbage truck driver. His uncle, a former employee of the New York City Department of Sanitation, encouraged him to pursue the position. Screvane rose quickly within the sanitation department. In 1957, Mayor Robert Wagner appointed him as the Commissioner of Sanitation at just 42 years old. In his term, Screvane ordered that during winters, snow be pushed into the middle of the streets, where it was churned into slush by passing cars, thus ending the previous practice that snow be removed from streets by hiring extra trucks to cart mounds of snow away and dump it in the river. In consequence, though the cost of hiring trucks was significantly reduced, after each snowfall, the cleaning and dyeing bills increased substantially, as bystanders' clothes would be splattered by passing cars.

Wagner convinced Screvane to run for Council President in 1961. On September 7, 1961, he defeated State Senator Thomas J. Mackell in the Democratic primary for the position. In the general election, he defeated Paul A. Fino, a United States congressman. During the summer of 1962, he served as acting mayor when Mayor Wagner was on vacation with his family.

In 1965, Screvane ran for the office of Mayor. During the Democratic primary, he came in second to Abe Beame, who eventually lost the election to John Lindsay.

== Later life and death ==
After leaving public office, he entered the private sector. In a brief stint from 1974 to 1978, he served as the head of the New York City Off-Track Betting Corporation. He retired from business in 1994.

He died on November 4, 2001, from congestive heart failure at his home in Wyomissing, Pennsylvania.

== Personal life ==
Ten months before the Pearl Harbor attack, Screvane joined the military. By the end of World War II, he had earned the rank of colonel.

He was married to Bridey McKessy Screvane. She died in 1989. They had four children.

== See also ==
- J. Raymond Jones

Political offices
Preceded by Abe Stark	President of the New York City Council; 1962 – 1966	Succeeded by Frank D. O'Connor
