= 1928 United States presidential election in New York =

- November 6, 1928
- Turnout: 68.3% ▲12.0 pp

Nominee	Herbert Hoover	Al Smith
Party	Republican	Democratic
Home state	California	New York
Running mate	Charles Curtis	Joseph T. Robinson
Electoral vote	45	0
Popular vote	2,193,344	2,089,863
Percentage	49.79%	47.44%
County results
Hoover
50–60%
60–70%
70–80%
Smith
40–50%
50–60%
60–70%
President before election
Calvin Coolidge
Republican
Elected President
Herbert Hoover
Republican

The 1928 United States presidential election in New York took place on November 6, 1928. All contemporary 48 states were part of the 1928 United States presidential election. State voters chose 45 electors to the Electoral College, which selected the president and vice president.

New York was won by Republican former Secretary of Commerce Herbert Hoover of California, who was running against Democratic Governor of New York Alfred E. Smith. Hoover's running mate was Senate Majority Leader Charles Curtis of Kansas, while Smith's running mate was Senator Joseph Taylor Robinson of Arkansas.

Hoover won with a plurality of 49.79 percent of the vote to Smith's 47.44 percent, a margin of 2.35 points. Socialist candidate Norman Thomas finished a distant third, with 2.44 percent. Although New York was Al Smith's home state and he had been elected governor there, the 1920s were a fiercely Republican decade in American politics, and New York during the Fourth Party System was a fiercely Republican state in presidential elections. In 1928, Herbert Hoover won the third consecutive nationwide Republican landslide, and the economic boom and social good feelings of the Roaring Twenties under popular Republican leadership proved too much for Smith to overcome both nationally and in his home state.

However, Smith's performance in New York was still impressive in the context of the 1920s, and highly significant in shaping the state's political development. In the elections preceding 1928, New York had been more Republican than the nation as a whole, even in the nationwide Republican landslides of 1920 and 1924. Smith's narrow 2-point defeat in the midst of the nationwide Republican landslide of 1928 made New York State 15% more Democratic than the national average. Smith's 47.44 percent was also the highest vote share a Democratic presidential candidate had received in New York State since former New York Governor Grover Cleveland won the state in 1892, as Woodrow Wilson only won the state with 41% in 1912 when the Republican vote was split.

Smith dramatically improved upon how Democrats before him had done and laid the groundwork for turning the state Democratic in 1932 and beyond. In 1920 and 1924, Republicans had swept every county in New York State and Democrats had received less than 30% of the vote. In 1928, Smith came within 2 points of winning the state by sweeping all five boroughs of heavily populated New York City, winning Albany County, home to the state capital of Albany, along with neighboring Rensselaer County, and winning two counties in northern New York along the Saint Lawrence River, Clinton County and Franklin County.

== Results ==
1928 United States presidential election in New York
Party	Candidate	Votes	Percentage	Electoral votes
Republican	Herbert Hoover	2,193,344	49.79%	45
Democratic	Alfred E. Smith	2,089,863	47.44%	0
Socialist	Norman Thomas	107,332	2.44%	0
Communist	William Z. Foster	10,876	0.25%	0
Socialist Labor	Verne L. Reynolds	4,211	0.10%	0
Totals		4,405,626	100.0%	45

=== New York City results ===
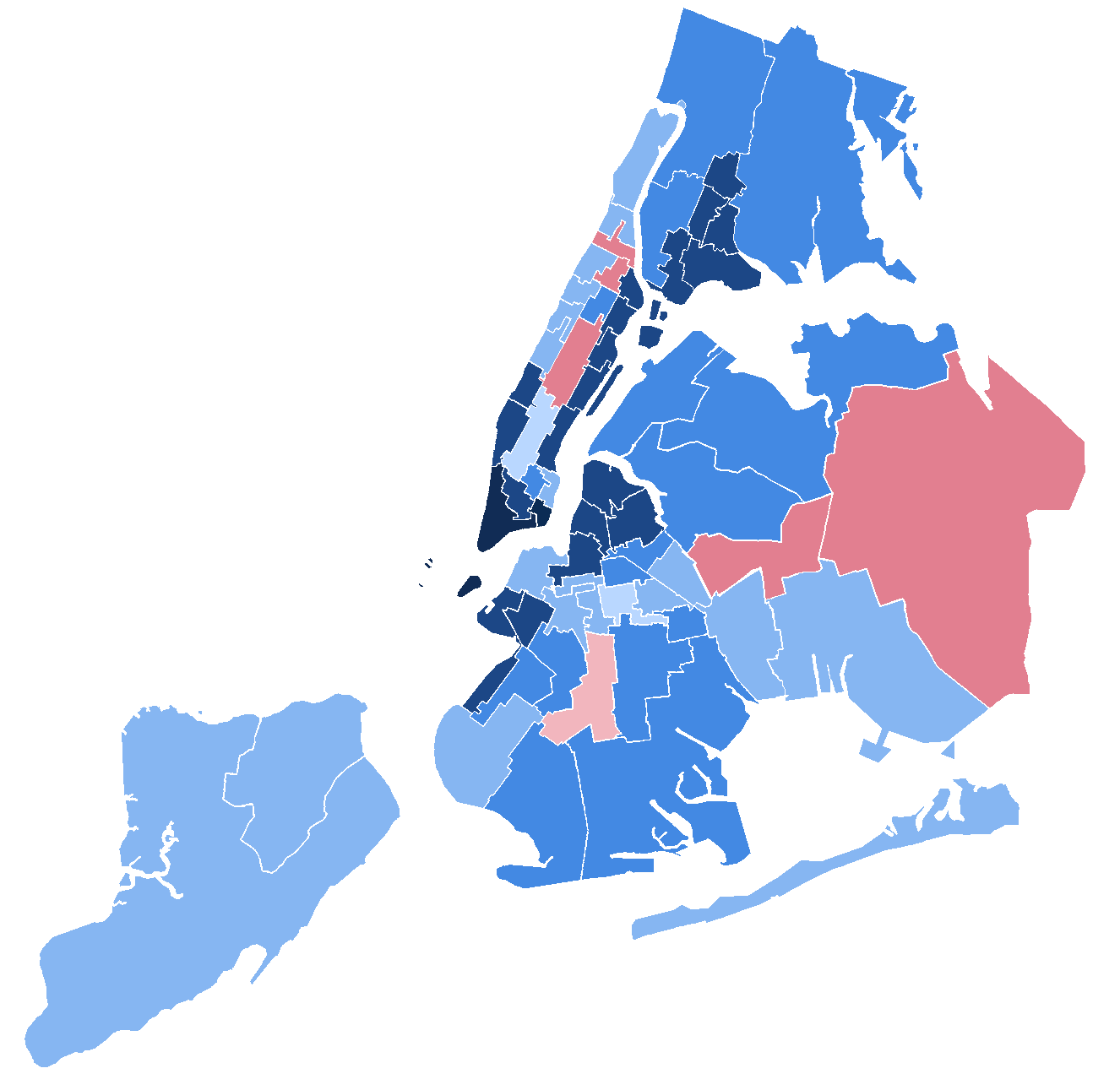
Results in New York City by assembly district. The colors are the same as above with the following additions: Hoover 40–50% Hoover 50–60% Smith 40–50% Smith 50–60% Smith 60–70% Smith 70–80% Smith 80–90%

1928 Presidential Election in New York City		Manhattan	The Bronx	Brooklyn	Queens	Staten Island	Total	
Democratic	Al Smith	317,227	232,766	404,393	184,640	28,945	1,167,971	60.04%
Democratic	Al Smith	60.82%	67.67%	59.48%	53.43%	53.37%	1,167,971	60.04%
Republican	Herbert Hoover	186,396	98,636	245,622	158,505	24,995	714,154	36.71%
Republican	Herbert Hoover	35.74%	28.68%	36.13%	45.87%	46.09%	714,154	36.71%
Socialist	Norman Thomas	15,076	8,904	24,888	1,886	252	51,006	2.62%
Socialist	Norman Thomas	2.89%	2.59%	3.66%	0.55%	0.46%	51,006	2.62%
Communist	William Z. Foster	2,145	3,297	3,362	396	32	9,232	0.47%
Communist	William Z. Foster	0.41%	0.96%	0.49%	0.11%	0.06%	9,232	0.47%
Socialist Labor	Verne L. Reynolds	714	344	1,572	129	10	2,769	0.14%
Socialist Labor	Verne L. Reynolds	0.14%	0.15%	0.23%	0.04%	0.02%	2,769	0.14%
TOTAL		521,558	343,947	679,837	345,556	54,234	1,945,132	100.00%

=== Results by county ===
County	Herbert Hoover Republican		Al Smith Democratic		Normal M. Thomas Socialist		Various candidates Other parties		Margin		Total votes cast
County	#	%	#	%	#	%	#	%	#	%	Total votes cast
Albany	48,762	42.99%	62,380	54.99%	2,223	1.96%	72	0.06%	-13,618	-12.00%	113,437
Allegany	15,306	78.90%	3,491	18.00%	588	3.03%	14	0.07%	11,815	60.91%	19,399
Bronx	98,636	28.68%	232,766	67.67%	8,904	2.59%	3,641	1.06%	-134,130	-39.00%	343,947
Broome	39,860	65.25%	19,563	32.02%	1,552	2.54%	117	0.19%	20,297	33.22%	61,092
Cattaraugus	22,135	67.07%	10,229	31.00%	602	1.82%	35	0.11%	11,906	36.08%	33,001
Cayuga	20,202	62.11%	11,787	36.24%	512	1.57%	24	0.07%	8,415	25.87%	32,525
Chautauqua	38,220	72.68%	13,223	25.15%	1,002	1.91%	139	0.26%	24,997	47.54%	52,584
Chemung	25,029	67.00%	12,189	32.63%	109	0.29%	27	0.07%	12,840	34.37%	37,354
Chenango	13,955	77.21%	3,986	22.05%	122	0.68%	10	0.06%	9,969	55.16%	18,073
Clinton	7,824	41.68%	10,888	58.00%	57	0.30%	2	0.01%	-3,064	-16.32%	18,771
Columbia	14,000	67.92%	6,403	31.06%	186	0.90%	23	0.11%	7,597	36.86%	20,612
Cortland	11,960	75.37%	3,662	23.08%	234	1.47%	13	0.08%	8,298	52.29%	15,869
Delaware	16,225	78.59%	4,362	21.13%	46	0.22%	12	0.06%	11,863	57.46%	20,645
Dutchess	28,687	61.30%	16,748	35.79%	1,300	2.78%	66	0.14%	11,939	25.51%	46,801
Erie	144,726	51.36%	126,449	44.87%	10,118	3.59%	496	0.18%	18,277	6.49%	281,789
Essex	10,462	66.34%	5,291	33.55%	17	0.11%	0	0.00%	5,171	32.79%	15,770
Franklin	9,495	49.86%	9,501	49.89%	47	0.25%	2	0.01%	-6	-0.03%	19,045
Fulton	15,043	71.16%	5,728	27.10%	334	1.58%	34	0.16%	9,315	44.07%	21,139
Genesee	13,251	69.03%	5,181	26.99%	739	3.85%	24	0.13%	8,070	42.04%	19,195
Greene	9,529	66.71%	4,440	31.08%	308	2.16%	8	0.06%	5,089	35.62%	14,285
Hamilton	1,399	59.51%	952	40.49%	0	0.00%	0	0.00%	447	19.01%	2,351
Herkimer	18,624	62.69%	10,654	35.86%	412	1.39%	19	0.06%	7,970	26.83%	29,709
Jefferson	26,361	66.41%	12,908	32.52%	402	1.01%	24	0.06%	13,453	33.89%	39,695
Kings	245,622	36.13%	404,393	59.48%	24,888	3.66%	4,934	0.73%	-158,771	-23.35%	679,837
Lewis	7,175	63.25%	4,161	36.68%	4	0.04%	4	0.04%	3,014	26.57%	11,344
Livingston	11,632	64.05%	5,545	30.53%	968	5.33%	15	0.08%	6,087	33.52%	18,160
Madison	14,333	72.20%	5,217	26.28%	280	1.41%	21	0.11%	9,116	45.92%	19,851
Monroe	99,803	55.73%	73,759	41.19%	5,180	2.89%	336	0.19%	26,044	14.54%	179,078
Montgomery	15,257	60.28%	9,845	38.90%	178	0.70%	29	0.11%	5,412	21.38%	25,309
Nassau	71,015	62.77%	40,079	35.42%	1,901	1.68%	145	0.13%	30,936	27.34%	113,140
New York	186,396	35.74%	317,227	60.82%	15,076	2.89%	2,859	0.55%	-130,831	-25.08%	521,558
Niagara	33,229	63.35%	16,881	32.18%	2,302	4.39%	41	0.08%	16,348	31.17%	52,453
Oneida	44,782	52.82%	38,231	45.09%	1,684	1.99%	89	0.10%	6,551	7.73%	84,786
Onondaga	76,278	57.04%	54,706	40.91%	2,559	1.91%	173	0.13%	21,572	16.13%	133,716
Ontario	17,769	65.27%	8,491	31.19%	955	3.51%	10	0.04%	9,278	34.08%	27,225
Orange	37,334	64.10%	19,047	32.70%	1,817	3.12%	42	0.07%	18,287	31.40%	58,240
Orleans	9,828	68.77%	3,792	26.53%	652	4.56%	20	0.14%	6,036	42.23%	14,292
Oswego	21,849	64.39%	11,639	34.30%	418	1.23%	24	0.07%	10,210	30.09%	33,930
Otsego	18,286	74.32%	6,006	24.41%	298	1.21%	16	0.07%	12,280	49.91%	24,606
Putnam	4,534	64.95%	2,278	32.63%	161	2.31%	8	0.11%	2,256	32.32%	6,981
Queens	158,505	45.87%	184,640	53.43%	1,886	0.55%	525	0.15%	-26,135	-7.56%	345,556
Rensselaer	32,370	48.90%	33,094	50.00%	638	0.96%	89	0.13%	-724	-1.09%	66,191
Richmond	24,995	46.09%	28,945	53.37%	252	0.46%	42	0.08%	-3,950	-7.28%	54,234
Rockland	15,732	60.34%	9,769	37.47%	513	1.97%	58	0.22%	5,963	22.87%	26,072
Saratoga	19,183	59.60%	12,247	38.05%	722	2.24%	35	0.11%	6,936	21.55%	32,187
Schenectady	29,428	56.58%	21,277	40.91%	1,183	2.27%	121	0.23%	8,151	15.67%	52,009
Schoharie	6,906	67.65%	2,926	28.66%	357	3.50%	20	0.20%	3,980	38.99%	10,209
Schuyler	4,749	72.10%	1,731	26.28%	103	1.56%	4	0.06%	3,018	45.82%	6,587
Seneca	7,911	66.27%	3,873	32.44%	147	1.23%	7	0.06%	4,038	33.82%	11,938
St. Lawrence	25,804	66.23%	12,567	32.26%	562	1.44%	27	0.07%	13,237	33.98%	38,960
Steuben	28,028	69.26%	10,699	26.44%	1,694	4.19%	45	0.11%	17,329	42.82%	40,466
Suffolk	41,199	65.07%	19,497	30.79%	2,544	4.02%	75	0.12%	21,702	34.28%	63,315
Sullivan	10,331	61.27%	6,207	36.81%	284	1.68%	39	0.23%	4,124	24.46%	16,861
Tioga	9,963	76.89%	2,779	21.45%	198	1.53%	18	0.14%	7,184	55.44%	12,958
Tompkins	14,471	72.84%	5,114	25.74%	244	1.23%	37	0.19%	9,357	47.10%	19,866
Ulster	25,418	62.46%	14,200	34.89%	1,024	2.52%	53	0.13%	11,218	27.57%	40,695
Warren	11,697	63.16%	6,793	36.68%	29	0.16%	0	0.00%	4,904	26.48%	18,519
Washington	15,499	66.91%	7,221	31.17%	428	1.85%	15	0.06%	8,278	35.74%	23,163
Wayne	18,187	75.29%	5,338	22.10%	603	2.50%	27	0.11%	12,849	53.19%	24,155
Westchester	109,939	56.22%	80,926	41.39%	4,408	2.25%	271	0.14%	29,013	14.84%	195,544
Wyoming	10,830	71.48%	3,992	26.35%	326	2.15%	4	0.03%	6,838	45.13%	15,152
Yates	7,386	78.62%	1,950	20.76%	52	0.55%	7	0.07%	5,436	57.86%	9,395
Totals	2,193,344	49.79%	2,089,863	47.44%	107,332	2.44%	15,087	0.34%	103,481	2.35%	4,405,626

==== Counties that flipped from Republican to Democratic ====
- Albany
- Bronx
- Clinton
- Franklin
- Kings
- New York
- Queens
- Rensselaer
- Richmond

== Analysis ==
Key to Smith's strength in New York State was his sweep of the five massively populated boroughs of New York City. A New York City native, Smith took over 60% of the vote in Manhattan and the Bronx, and also won majorities in Brooklyn, Queens, and Staten Island. Up to this point, 1928 was the strongest victory ever for a Democrat in the city. Smith, a Roman Catholic of Irish, Italian, and German immigrant heritage, held special appeal to Catholic and ethnic immigrant communities that populated cities like New York and Boston. The first Catholic to be nominated on a major-party ticket, Smith's Catholicism would severely weaken his candidacy in many rural parts of the country, especially in the South, but would prove an asset in appealing to voters in New York. The urban, ethnic coalition that delivered New York City to Al Smith would prove to be a harbinger of long-term realignment of both the city and the state toward the Democratic Party. 1928 began a Democratic winning streak in New York City that has never been broken since, as New York City would be solidified as one of the most Democratic cities in the United States, and a major obstacle to overcome for any Republican seeking to compete in New York State. 1928 also turned the state capital of Albany, which had previously been a Republican city, into a Democratic bastion in upstate New York. This was the first time Democrats swept all five boroughs of New York City, which would also occur in 1932 and 1936. Albany and Rensselaer counties voted Democratic for the first time since 1892, Clinton County since 1864, and Franklin County since 1856.

Hoover, for his part, was able to hold on to New York State's electoral votes in 1928 by sweeping much of traditionally staunchly Republican upstate New York and Long Island, where efforts from Hoover's future successor Franklin D. Roosevelt could not swing dry, Protestant Yankee voters to Smith. In addition, the turnout and vote number margins were not yet there in New York City in 1928 to overcome Republican dominance in the rest of the state. In 1932, Franklin D. Roosevelt would build on Smith's coalition to flip New York State into the Democratic column, winning the state with virtually the same county map as Smith, but with stronger vote number margins and turnout. After 1928, New York State would not vote Republican again until 1948.

== See also ==
- United States presidential elections in New York
- Presidency of Herbert Hoover
