= 1932 United States presidential election in New York =

- November 8, 1932
- Turnout: 66.1% ▼2.2 pp

Nominee	Franklin D. Roosevelt	Herbert Hoover
Party	Democratic	Republican
Home state	New York	California
Running mate	John Nance Garner	Charles Curtis
Electoral vote	47	0
Popular vote	2,534,959	1,937,963
Percentage	54.07%	41.33%
County results
Roosevelt
50–60%
60–70%
70–80%
Hoover
40–50%
50–60%
60–70%
70–80%
President before election
Herbert Hoover
Republican
Elected President
Franklin D. Roosevelt
Democratic

The 1932 United States presidential election in New York took place on November 8, 1932. All contemporary 48 states were part of the 1932 United States presidential election. Voters chose 47 electors to the Electoral College, which selected the president and vice president.

New York was won by Democratic Governor of New York Franklin D. Roosevelt, who was challenging embattled incumbent Republican President Herbert Hoover. Roosevelt ran with Speaker of the House John Nance Garner of Texas, and Hoover ran with incumbent Vice President Charles Curtis of Kansas. With the incumbent Republican president greatly weakened by his failures to adequately address the Great Depression, the New York Governor easily carried his home state amid a nationwide Democratic landslide. Franklin Roosevelt took 54.07% of the vote in New York State versus Herbert Hoover's 41.33%, a margin of 12.74%. Socialist candidate Norman Thomas finished a distant third, with 3.78%. Despite being Roosevelt's home state – and although he won the state comfortably – in the context of the 1932 nationwide Democratic landslide, New York weighed in for this election as 5% more Republican than the national average.

1932 was the first time a Democrat had won New York's electoral votes since 1912, when Republican vote-splitting for the third party candidacy of Theodore Roosevelt had allowed Democrat Woodrow Wilson to win the state with a plurality of only 41% of the vote. Franklin Roosevelt's 54.07% made him the first Democratic presidential candidate to win an absolute majority of the vote in New York State since Samuel J. Tilden in 1876. Roosevelt's 12.74% victory margin over Hoover was the widest victory margin ever for a Democratic presidential candidate in New York State up to that point, although it would be surpassed just 4 years later by Roosevelt's own 20-point re-election victory in 1936.

Roosevelt's support in the state did not appear spontaneously in 1932; his winning strategy in New York State was primarily to build upon the Democratic coalition fellow New Yorker Al Smith had organized behind him in the 1928 election. Smith had narrowly lost the state amid a nationwide Republican landslide, but had dramatically improved upon how Democrats before him had done, and laid the groundwork for turning the state Democratic in 1932 and beyond. In 1920 and 1924, Republicans had swept every county in New York State and Democrats took less than 30% of the vote. In 1928, Smith came within 2 points of winning the state by sweeping all five boroughs of heavily populated New York City, winning Albany County, home to the state capital of Albany, along with neighboring Rensselaer County, and winning two counties in northern New York along the Saint Lawrence River, Clinton County and Franklin County. FDR turned a 2-point statewide Democratic defeat in 1928 into a 13-point victory in 1932 primarily by pushing up turnout and victory margins in Smith's 1928 counties, as the county map remained almost entirely the same. Only one county in New York State changed hands from Hoover in 1928 to Roosevelt in 1932, rural Sullivan County, which voted Democratic for the first time since 1912.

== Results ==
1932 United States presidential election in New York
Party	Candidate	Votes	Percentage	Electoral votes
Democratic	Franklin D. Roosevelt	2,534,959	54.07%	47
Republican	Herbert Hoover (incumbent)	1,937,963	41.33%	0
Socialist	Norman Thomas	177,397	3.78%	0
Communist	William Z. Foster	27,956	0.60%	0
Socialist Labor	Verne L. Reynolds	10,339	0.22%	0
Totals		4,688,614	100.0%	47

=== New York City results ===
1932 Presidential Election in New York City		Manhattan	The Bronx	Brooklyn	Queens	Staten Island	Total	
Democratic	Franklin D. Roosevelt	378,077	281,330	514,172	244,740	36,857	1,455,176	66.37%
Democratic	Franklin D. Roosevelt	66.89%	70.35%	66.86%	61.47%	61.08%	1,455,176	66.37%
Republican	Herbert Hoover	157,014	76,587	192,536	136,641	21,278	584,056	26.64%
Republican	Herbert Hoover	27.78%	19.15%	25.04%	34.32%	35.26%	584,056	26.64%
Socialist	Norman Thomas	23,946	31,247	50,509	14,854	2,009	122,565	5.59%
Socialist	Norman Thomas	4.24%	7.81%	6.57%	3.73%	3.33%	122,565	5.59%
Communist	William Z. Foster	4,843	8,829	9,287	1,143	112	24,214	1.10%
Communist	William Z. Foster	0.86%	2.21%	1.21%	0.29%	0.19%	24,214	1.10%
Socialist Labor	Verne L. Reynolds	1,325	1,926	2,504	763	89	6,607	0.30%
Socialist Labor	Verne L. Reynolds	0.23%	0.48%	0.33%	0.19%	0.15%	6,607	0.30%
TOTAL		565,205	399,919	769,008	398,141	60,345	2,192,618	100.00%

=== Results by county ===
County	Franklin D. Roosevelt Democratic		Herbert Hoover Republican		Norman M. Thomas Socialist		William Z. Foster Communist		Verne L. Reynolds Socialist Labor		Margin		Total votes cast
County	#	%	#	%	#	%	#	%	#	%	#	%	Total votes cast
Albany	73,194	60.61%	46,244	38.29%	1,181	0.98%	48	0.04%	92	0.08%	26,950	22.32%	120,759
Allegany	4,961	27.91%	12,348	69.46%	427	2.40%	12	0.07%	29	0.16%	-7,387	-41.55%	17,777
Bronx	281,330	70.35%	76,587	19.15%	31,247	7.81%	8,829	2.21%	1,926	0.48%	204,743	51.20%	399,919
Broome	22,802	40.36%	32,751	57.97%	673	1.19%	215	0.38%	53	0.09%	-9,949	-17.61%	56,494
Cattaraugus	11,467	37.25%	18,071	58.70%	1,176	3.82%	15	0.05%	57	0.19%	-6,604	-21.45%	30,786
Cayuga	12,989	41.84%	17,280	55.66%	713	2.30%	31	0.10%	30	0.10%	-4,291	-13.82%	31,043
Chautauqua	16,914	33.64%	30,479	60.62%	2,385	4.74%	242	0.48%	255	0.51%	-13,565	-26.98%	50,275
Chemung	13,825	39.78%	20,152	57.99%	740	2.13%	21	0.06%	12	0.03%	-6,327	-18.21%	34,750
Chenango	5,953	33.60%	11,566	65.27%	185	1.04%	5	0.03%	10	0.06%	-5,613	-31.68%	17,719
Clinton	11,027	56.94%	8,263	42.67%	68	0.35%	2	0.01%	5	0.03%	2,764	14.27%	19,365
Columbia	9,083	43.39%	11,667	55.74%	155	0.74%	24	0.11%	2	0.01%	-2,584	-12.35%	20,931
Cortland	4,425	30.34%	9,859	67.60%	284	1.95%	4	0.03%	13	0.09%	-5,434	-37.26%	14,585
Delaware	6,723	33.65%	13,050	65.32%	194	0.97%	6	0.03%	7	0.04%	-6,327	-31.67%	19,980
Dutchess	20,374	43.47%	25,757	54.95%	634	1.35%	59	0.13%	47	0.10%	-5,383	-11.48%	46,871
Erie	131,012	46.31%	141,059	49.86%	9,485	3.35%	677	0.24%	697	0.25%	-10,047	-3.55%	282,930
Essex	5,597	35.46%	10,062	63.74%	113	0.72%	4	0.03%	10	0.06%	-4,465	-28.28%	15,786
Franklin	10,318	51.96%	9,422	47.45%	106	0.53%	2	0.01%	9	0.05%	896	4.51%	19,857
Fulton	5,678	27.05%	14,984	71.39%	249	1.19%	41	0.20%	36	0.17%	-9,306	-44.34%	20,988
Genesee	6,152	33.55%	11,881	64.80%	280	1.53%	11	0.06%	11	0.06%	-5,729	-31.25%	18,335
Greene	6,794	47.64%	7,334	51.43%	123	0.86%	5	0.04%	5	0.04%	-540	-3.79%	14,261
Hamilton	1,107	40.58%	1,603	58.76%	18	0.66%	0	0.00%	0	0.00%	-496	-18.18%	2,728
Herkimer	11,194	41.78%	15,158	56.58%	394	1.47%	22	0.08%	22	0.08%	-3,964	-14.80%	26,790
Jefferson	13,478	36.70%	22,760	61.98%	451	1.23%	7	0.02%	28	0.08%	-9,282	-25.28%	36,724
Kings	514,172	66.86%	192,536	25.04%	50,509	6.57%	9,287	1.21%	2,504	0.33%	321,636	41.82%	769,008
Lewis	4,086	39.20%	6,258	60.03%	70	0.67%	6	0.06%	4	0.04%	-2,172	-20.84%	10,424
Livingston	6,529	36.50%	11,114	62.13%	226	1.26%	5	0.03%	14	0.08%	-4,585	-25.63%	17,888
Madison	6,896	35.78%	11,931	61.91%	413	2.14%	8	0.04%	24	0.12%	-5,035	-26.13%	19,272
Monroe	83,208	44.75%	95,964	51.60%	5,950	3.20%	651	0.35%	187	0.10%	-12,756	-6.86%	185,960
Montgomery	11,700	44.87%	14,104	54.09%	131	0.50%	25	0.10%	116	0.44%	-2,404	-9.22%	26,076
Nassau	61,752	42.85%	78,544	54.51%	3,521	2.44%	181	0.13%	102	0.07%	-16,792	-11.65%	144,100
New York	378,077	66.89%	157,014	27.78%	23,946	4.24%	4,843	0.86%	1,325	0.23%	221,063	39.11%	565,205
Niagara	20,765	39.26%	30,852	58.33%	1,117	2.11%	75	0.14%	82	0.16%	-10,087	-19.07%	52,891
Oneida	38,413	47.34%	41,193	50.76%	1,318	1.62%	62	0.08%	162	0.20%	-2,780	-3.43%	81,148
Onondaga	62,227	46.71%	66,363	49.81%	4,158	3.12%	213	0.16%	258	0.19%	-4,136	-3.10%	133,219
Ontario	9,273	36.62%	15,624	61.71%	398	1.57%	9	0.04%	16	0.06%	-6,351	-25.08%	25,320
Orange	22,971	42.21%	30,687	56.39%	703	1.29%	28	0.05%	34	0.06%	-7,716	-14.18%	54,423
Orleans	4,303	30.05%	9,735	67.98%	222	1.55%	5	0.03%	56	0.39%	-5,432	-37.93%	14,321
Oswego	13,314	41.35%	18,322	56.90%	520	1.61%	18	0.06%	27	0.08%	-5,008	-15.55%	32,201
Otsego	8,114	34.88%	14,904	64.06%	233	1.00%	2	0.01%	12	0.05%	-6,790	-29.19%	23,265
Putnam	3,730	43.82%	4,633	54.43%	137	1.61%	6	0.07%	6	0.07%	-903	-10.61%	8,512
Queens	244,740	61.47%	136,641	34.32%	14,854	3.73%	1,143	0.29%	763	0.19%	108,099	27.15%	398,141
Rensselaer	32,783	51.05%	30,606	47.66%	662	1.03%	61	0.09%	105	0.16%	2,177	3.39%	64,217
Richmond	36,857	61.08%	21,278	35.26%	2,009	3.33%	112	0.19%	89	0.15%	15,579	25.82%	60,345
Rockland	13,347	47.70%	13,963	49.90%	599	2.14%	34	0.12%	39	0.14%	-616	-2.20%	27,982
Saratoga	13,053	41.34%	17,990	56.97%	488	1.55%	16	0.05%	31	0.10%	-4,937	-15.63%	31,578
Schenectady	22,230	41.65%	28,187	52.81%	2,630	4.93%	140	0.26%	184	0.34%	-5,957	-11.16%	53,371
Schoharie	4,684	45.40%	5,513	53.43%	109	1.06%	4	0.04%	8	0.08%	-829	-8.03%	10,318
Schuyler	2,255	32.77%	4,491	65.27%	81	1.18%	18	0.26%	36	0.52%	-2,236	-32.50%	6,881
Seneca	4,764	41.48%	6,502	56.61%	167	1.45%	12	0.10%	41	0.36%	-1,738	-15.13%	11,486
St. Lawrence	12,687	35.56%	22,650	63.48%	204	0.57%	39	0.11%	100	0.28%	-9,963	-27.92%	35,680
Steuben	13,219	35.77%	22,986	62.19%	687	1.86%	12	0.03%	55	0.15%	-9,767	-26.43%	36,959
Suffolk	30,799	42.46%	40,247	55.49%	1,365	1.88%	69	0.10%	48	0.07%	-9,448	-13.03%	72,528
Sullivan	9,656	52.15%	8,294	44.79%	435	2.35%	110	0.59%	22	0.12%	1,362	7.36%	18,517
Tioga	4,067	32.99%	8,047	65.27%	181	1.47%	16	0.13%	17	0.14%	-3,980	-32.28%	12,328
Tompkins	6,180	32.67%	12,185	64.42%	496	2.62%	32	0.17%	23	0.12%	-6,005	-31.75%	18,916
Ulster	18,092	45.55%	21,002	52.87%	566	1.42%	38	0.10%	23	0.06%	-2,910	-7.33%	39,721
Warren	6,661	36.22%	11,585	62.99%	133	0.72%	4	0.02%	9	0.05%	-4,924	-26.77%	18,392
Washington	7,512	33.86%	14,478	65.26%	144	0.65%	6	0.03%	44	0.20%	-6,966	-31.40%	22,184
Wayne	7,122	31.41%	15,031	66.29%	341	1.50%	28	0.12%	153	0.67%	-7,909	-34.88%	22,675
Westchester	101,435	45.94%	112,747	51.07%	6,023	2.73%	352	0.16%	231	0.10%	-11,312	-5.12%	220,788
Wyoming	4,490	31.76%	9,377	66.33%	255	1.80%	3	0.02%	12	0.08%	-4,887	-34.57%	14,137
Yates	2,399	27.95%	6,048	70.46%	115	1.34%	1	0.01%	21	0.24%	-3,649	-42.51%	8,584
Totals	2,534,959	54.07%	1,937,963	41.33%	177,397	3.78%	27,956	0.60%	10,339	0.22%	596,996	12.73%	4,688,614

==== Counties that flipped from Republican to Democratic ====
- Sullivan

== Analysis ==
The most vital component to Roosevelt's victory in New York State was his overwhelming landslide in the massively populated 5 boroughs of New York City. Roosevelt took over 70% of the vote in the Bronx, and over 60% in Manhattan, Brooklyn, Queens, and Staten Island. Up to this point, 1932 was the strongest victory ever for a Democrat in the city, although Roosevelt would outperform himself with an even stronger performance in the city in 1936. FDR built on the urban, ethnic coalition that had delivered the city to Al Smith 4 years earlier, and with the rise of the New Deal Coalition, New York would be solidified as one of the most Democratic cities in the United States. Just as Al Smith's 1928 counties remained loyal to the Democrats in 1932, most of upstate New York which had gone Republican in 1928 remained loyal to Herbert Hoover in 1932, albeit with reduced margins. Albany County, home to the state capital of Albany, provided Roosevelt's strongest victory outside of New York City, giving him over 60% of the vote.

This was the second of three straight elections in which Democrats swept all five boroughs of New York City. Hoover only received at least forty percent of the vote in seven of the state assembly districts within New York City and only won a majority of the vote in one, the 15th district. His vote total in New York City declined from 36.71% in 1928, to 26.62% in 1932. Rensselaer County would not vote Democratic again until 1964. Roosevelt received 387,000 votes from Jews in New York City while Hoover received 95,000-105,000 votes and Thomas received 50,000-60,000 votes, which accounted for half of Thomas' 122,565 votes from New York City.

== See also ==
- United States presidential elections in New York
- Presidency of Franklin D. Roosevelt
- Timeline of the Great Depression
