= Coert van Voorhees =

Dutch migrant to New Amsterdam (1637–1702)

Coert Stevense van Voorhees
- Born: Coert van Voorhees; April 1637; Hees, Drenthe, Netherlands
- Died: c. 1702 (aged 64–65); Flatlands, Brooklyn, New York
- Other names: Coert Van Voorhuys, Voorhies, Voorhis
- Occupation: Farmer
- Spouse: Marretje Gerritse VanCouwenhoven (b. 1644-d.1708)
- Children: 9
- Parent: Steven van Voorhees
- Relatives: Wolphert Gerretse (grandfather)

Coert Stevense van Voorhees (1637–1702), a settler of New Netherland is remembered today as progenitor of numerous American families, and as an early settler of Brooklyn.

== Early life ==
He was born around April 1637 in Hees, near Ruinen, Drenthe, Netherlands, the son of Steven van Voorhees and Aeltje Wessels. Van Voorhees arrived in New Amsterdam when he was 22 years of age sailing on the de Bonte Koe in 1660.

== Career ==
He was a member and deacon of the Dutch Reformed Church in Flatlands in 1677 and captain of the militia in 1689, as well as representative of Flatlands in the Assembly held at city hall in New Amsterdam on 10 April 1664.

He took his oath of allegiance in September 1687 as Coert Stevense Van Voorhuys, having been in the country 27 years. On 8 March 1691, he purchased land from John Tilton of Gravesend and conveyed the property to his son Albert on 20 June 1694.

== Personal life ==
Van Voorhees married Marretje Gerritse van Couwenhoven, daughter of Gerret Wolfertse van Couwenhoven and Aeltje Cool, and granddaughter of Wolphert Gerretse, an original patentee of the New Netherland colony. He died sometime around or shortly after 1702.

== Legacy ==
He is known as the previous owner of the property where the Hendrick I. Lott House now stands, he sold the land in 1719 to Johannes Lott. The property and house is now a New York City Landmark.
