= Wolfert Gerritse van Couwenhoven =

Founder of the New Netherlands colony (1579–1662)

Wolfert Gerritses Van Couwenhoven
- Seal of New Netherlands

Schepen of New Amsterdam
- In office 1654–1654

Commissioner for New Netherlands to the States-General
- In office 1653–1653

Personal details
- Born: 1 May 1579
- Died: 1662 (aged 82–83)

Wolfert Gerritse Van Couwenhoven (1 May 1579 – 1662), also known as Wolphert Gerretse van Kouwenhoven and Wolphert Gerretsen, was an original patentee, director of bouweries (farms), and founder of the New Netherland colony.

His mark.

Along with his wife, Neeltje Janse Jacobdochter, Gerretse was one of the first Europeans to settle on Long Island, a farm he named New Amersfoort. He was a Schepen of New Amsterdam in 1654. He is noted as playing an "active role in laying the foundations of the communities of Manhattan, Albany, Rensselaer, and Brooklyn."

== Early life ==
Wolfert was born on 1 May 1579 in Amersfoort, Netherlands, one of three sons of Gerrit Suype Van Kouwenhoven and his wife, Styne Sara Roberts.

=== Farm description ===
A 1638 inventory for the farm named Achtervelt, owned by Wolfert Gerritse and Andries Hudde in what is now Flatlands, Brooklyn, describes the estate, which included a 40 by 18-foot barn:

"...one house surrounded by long, round palisades; the house is 26 feet long, 22 feet wide, 40 feet high with the roof, covered above and all around with boards ... "

The deed for this farm was the first for Long Island, "and one of the very first for land in New York." The deed describes the land as "the westernmost of the flats called Keskateuw belonging to them on the island called Suan Hacky between the bay of the North river and the East River of New Netherland."

The deed is signed by the Dutch colonial governor, Wouter von Twiller, at “Eylandt Manhatans” and reaffirmed on the back in 1658 by Gov. Peter Stuyvesant.

The area purchased was part of a larger area called, Keskateuw, meaning in the Lenape language, "where grass is cut."

== Career ==
=== Dutch West India Company ===
Wolfert ran a baking and clothes bleaching business, when in 1625 he was assigned as one of the first settlers to cultivate farms in the New Netherlands colony by the Dutch West India Company.

=== Director of Bouweries for Kiliaen van Rensselaer ===
In 1630, he returned to the Netherlands, where he entered into a contract with his cousin Kiliaen Van Rensselaer to return to the colony to manage his farms. Wolphert arrived back in the colony aboard the ship "Eendracht", where he proceeded in his duties as director for van Rensselaer's farms in Rensselaerwyck and Fort Orange.

His contract was to run through 1636, but Gerretse requested it cancelled early so he could pursue his own interests. Rensselaer agreed. In 1632, Gerretse was released from his contractual obligations.

=== New Amersfoort ===
Shortly thereafter, he leased a bouwerie in New Amsterdam and managed it until 1636, when he was granted a patent of several hundred acres on Long Island. He called his plantation "Achervelt"; later it served as the founding of the town of New Amersfoort, named after Gerritse's original home. Today the area is known as Flatlands.

In 2007 the deed of the granted land in Long Island was sold to a private collector for $156,000 becoming "one of the oldest Dutch documents in private hands". The deed dated 6 June 1636 is written in Dutch and outlines the purchase of the land (3,600-acre) from the Lenape Indians.

=== Public service ===
In 1637, he became a Freeholder in Midwout, and again in 1641. In 1653, he was sent by the colony to the States-General in the Netherlands as a Commissioner. In 1654, Wolphert served as a Schepen of New Amsterdam, and in 1657 was made a Burgher. He served on the citizens council of Eight Men.

== Death ==
Gerretse died in 1662.

== Marriage and children ==
A member of the Dutch Reformed Church, on 17 January 1605, he married Neeltje Janse Jacobsdochter in Amersfoort, Netherlands.

They had three sons:

1. Gerrit Wolfertsen Couwenhoven (1610–1648), a Representative at the Council of Eight in 1643
2. Jacob Wolphertse Suype Van Kouwenhoven (1612–1670), assistant to Gov. Woulter Van Twiller, Representative at the Board of Nine in 1647, 1649–1650, sat on the Court of Arbitrators between 1649 and 1650, Delegate of New Netherlands to the Hague in Holland
3. Pieter van Kouwenhoven (1614–1699), one of the first magistrates of New Netherlands, member of the Schepens Court 1653–1654, 1658–1659, 1661 and 1663, delegate from New Amsterdam to the Convention of 1653, Lieutenant in the Esopus War, signer of the peace treaty 1664 with the Esopus Indians

His granddaughter, Marretje Gerretse, daughter of Gerret, married Coert van Voorhees.

== Descendants ==
=== Later variations on surname ===
Some descendants of Wolfert anglicized the surname "Van Kouwenhoven" to "Kouwenhoven", "Kownover", "Conover", as well as "Crownover", with Dennis Conover (born 1764) being the first descendant (4th great grandson) to use "Conover" as his surname.

=== Notable descendants ===
- Cornelius Vanderbilt (1794–1877), business magnate
- Sidney Breese (1800–1878), U.S. senator from Illinois
- William A. Newell (1817–1901), 18th governor of New Jersey and founder United States Life-Saving Service
- John Monroe Van Vleck (1833–1912), astronomer
- E. H. Harriman (1848–1909), railroad baron
- Seth Conover, namesake of Conover, Wisconsin
- Theodore Roosevelt (1858–1919), 26th president of the United States
- Willis Van Devanter (1859–1941), associate justice of the Supreme Court of the United States
- The Wright Brothers, aviation pioneers
- Eleanor Roosevelt (1884–1962), First Lady of the United States
- Arthur S. Carpender (1884–1960), vice-admiral
- William B. Kouwenhoven (1886–1975), cardiology pioneer
- W. Averell Harriman (1891–1986), diplomat
- E. Roland Harriman (1895–1978), philanthropist
- John Hasbrouck Van Vleck (1899–1980), Nobel Prize winner
- Humphrey Bogart (1899–1957), actor
- Cissy Stuart (1914–1989), newspaper owner and murder victim
- Diana Douglas née Dill (1923–2015), actress and mother of actor Michael Douglas
- Lloyd Conover (1923–2017), chemist
- Gloria Vanderbilt (1924–2019), fashion designer
- Michael Douglas (born 1944), actor (through his mother Diana)
- Howard Dean (born 1948), 79th governor of Vermont
- Chrystie Crownover, actress
- Christopher N. Smith (born 1964), Honorary Consul of the Kingdom of Denmark
- Anderson Cooper (born 1967), journalist
- Lance Armstrong (born 1971), cyclist
- Andy Roddick (born 1982), tennis player
- Ryan Kalil (born 1985), football player
- Jacob Winchester (born 1987), voice actor and composer
- Matt Kalil (born 1989), football player
- Pam Gregory, figure skating coach

== Legacy ==
- Gerritsen Beach, Brooklyn, New York
- Conover, North Carolina
