= Mill Basin, Brooklyn =

Neighborhood in New York City

Mill Basin
- Neighborhood of Brooklyn
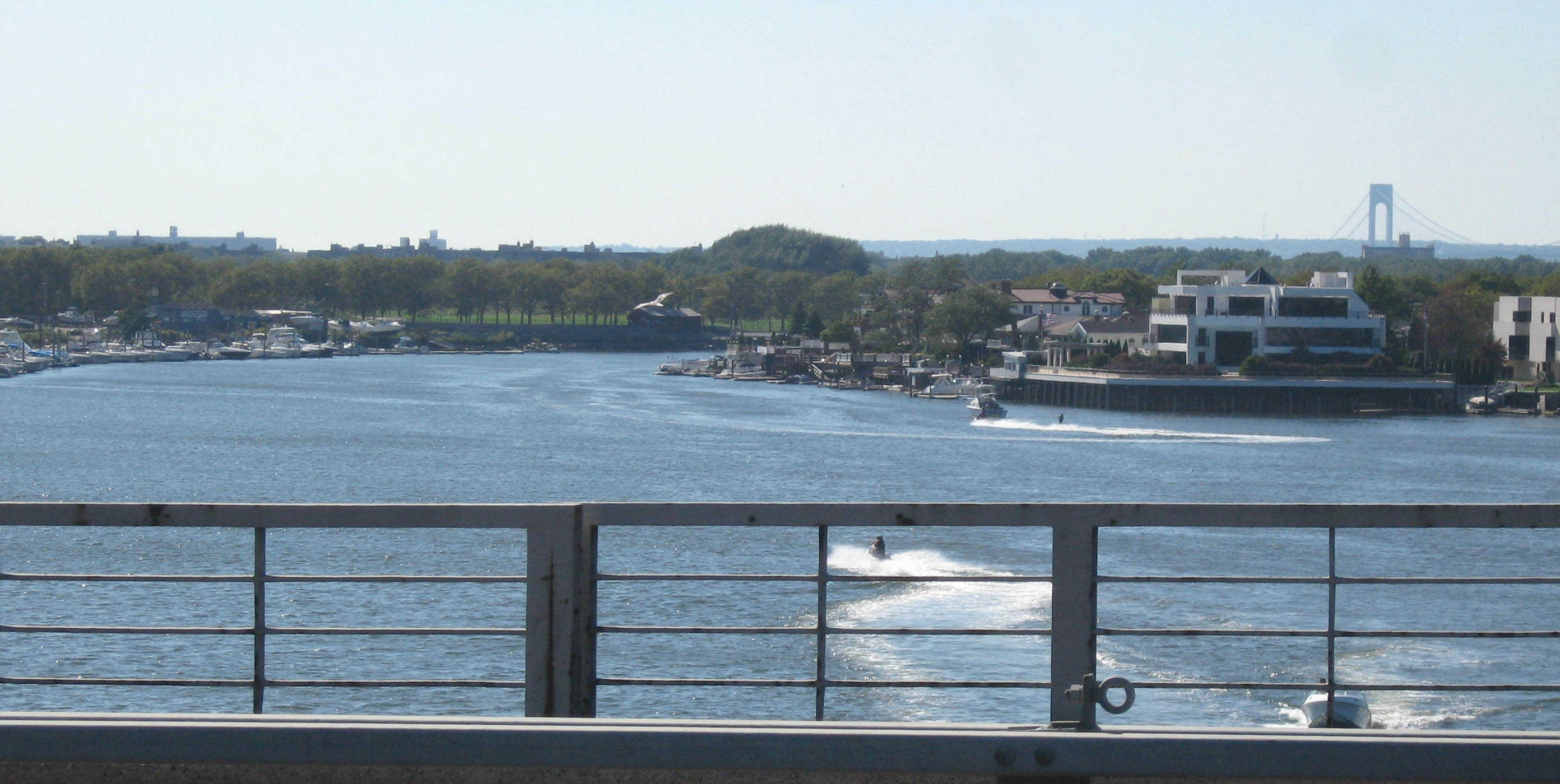
- The neighborhood and waterway of Mill Basin, seen from the Belt Parkway drawbridge
- Etymology: A grist mill built by Dutch settlers in the 17th century
- Location in New York City
- Coordinates: 40.610°N 73.911°W
- Country: United States
- State: (New York (state)) New York
- City: New York City
- Borough: Brooklyn
- Community District: Brooklyn 18

Population (2010)
  - Total: 45,231
- Neighborhood tabulation area; includes Mill Basin, Bergen Beach, Marine Park, and Flatlands

Ethnicity
  - White: 73.8%
  - Black: 10.9%
  - Hispanic: 7.9%
  - Asian: 5.6%
  - Other: 1.8%
- ZIP Code: 11234
- Area codes: 718, 347, 929, and 917

Mill Basin is a residential neighborhood in southeastern Brooklyn, New York City. It is on a peninsula abutting Jamaica Bay and is bordered by Avenue U on the northwest and the Mill Basin/Mill Island Inlet on its remaining sides. Mill Basin is adjacent to the neighborhood of Bergen Beach to the northeast, Flatlands to the northwest, Marine Park to the southwest, and Floyd Bennett Field and the former Barren Island to the southeast. Mill Basin also contains a subsection called Old Mill Basin, north of Avenue U.

Mill Basin was originally Mill Island, Jamaica Bay. In the 17th century, a mill was built on Mill, Bergen, and Barren Islands. The archipelago was then occupied by the Schenck and Crooke families through the late 19th century, and remained a mostly rural area with oyster fishing. After Robert Crooke developed a smelting plant on Mill Island in 1890, industrial customers started developing the island and connected it to the rest of Brooklyn. In an effort to develop Mill Basin as a seaport district, ports and dry docks were built in the early 20th century, though a lack of railroad connections hindered the area's further growth. Residential development began in the late 1940s, along with the rest of southeast Brooklyn, though some of the former industrial buildings remain.

Mill Basin is primarily residential, with a mix of commercial and industrial uses, including the Kings Plaza shopping mall in its western part. The area around Mill Basin consists of a mostly white population as of the 2010 United States census, and is sparsely served by public transportation. Nearby recreational areas include Floyd Bennett Field, the first municipal airport in New York City, which is part of the Gateway National Recreation Area and is just southeast of Mill Basin.

Mill Basin is part of Brooklyn Community District 18, and its primary ZIP Code is 11234. It is patrolled by the 63rd Precinct of the New York City Police Department.

== Geography ==
Originally, Mill Basin was an island in Jamaica Bay off the coast of Canarsie, called Mill Island. Most of the island was composed of low-lying meadows near sea level, but a very small part of it was arable uplands, or hilly areas above sea level. The area's original geography was vastly different from the modern geography.

A bulkhead was built along Mill Island's shore in the late 1890s. It was later connected to the uplands of nearby Bergen Beach, creating the continuous embankment between Mill and Paerdegat basins later used for the construction of the Belt Parkway. Most of the earliest filling operations along the island were private; the city government took over later. Some parts of Mill Basin remained a wetland until the late 20th century. A stream ran where Avenue U is today, dividing Mill Island from the mainland. Maps show that Mill Island was connected to the mainland by 1926, but modern city maps still allude to "Mill Island".

The New York Times described the neighborhood as a "mitten-shaped peninsula" enclosed to the south, west, and east by the eponymous waterway. Mill Basin is zoned as a predominantly residential neighborhood with one- or two-family residences. Small commercial overlays and recreational waterfront uses also exist, and the area between Avenue U and the Mill Basin waterway is zoned for heavy industry. Old Mill Basin is north of Avenue U. According to a map The New York Times published in 2009, Old Mill Basin can be considered to reach as far north as Avenue N.

== History ==
=== Early settlement ===
The local Lenape Native Americans originally inhabited the area. They referred to the surrounding area, including Mill and Barren Islands, as "Equendito" or "Equindito", a name that probably means "Broken Lands". In 1624, the Dutch Republic incorporated much of the current New York City area into the colony of New Netherland. In 1636, as Dutch settlers expanded outward from present-day Manhattan, they founded the town of Achtervelt (later Amersfoort, then Flatlands) and purchased 15,000 acres (6,100 ha) around Jamaica Bay. Amersfoort was centered around the present-day intersection of Flatbush Avenue and Flatlands Avenue. Canarsie Indian leaders signed three land agreements with Dutch settlers between 1636 and 1667, ceding much of their historic land, including Mill Island. Mill Island, as well as the nearby Barren Island, was sold to John Tilton Jr. and Samuel Spicer in 1664. At some point in the 1660s or 1670s, a settler named Elbert Elbertse leased Mill Island, along with Bergen and Barren Islands.

The land was owned from 1675 by Jans Martense Schenck, who built a house on the land believed to be one of the oldest houses in New York City. Schenck also built a pier so he could load and unload cargo to or from the Netherlands. A tide mill had been built on the land by that time, but the exact date of the mill's construction is not known; sources give dates between 1660 and 1675. One of Schenck's relatives, a ship captain named Hendrick, allegedly formed an alliance with the pirate William Kidd and allowed Kidd to bury treasure on Mill Island.

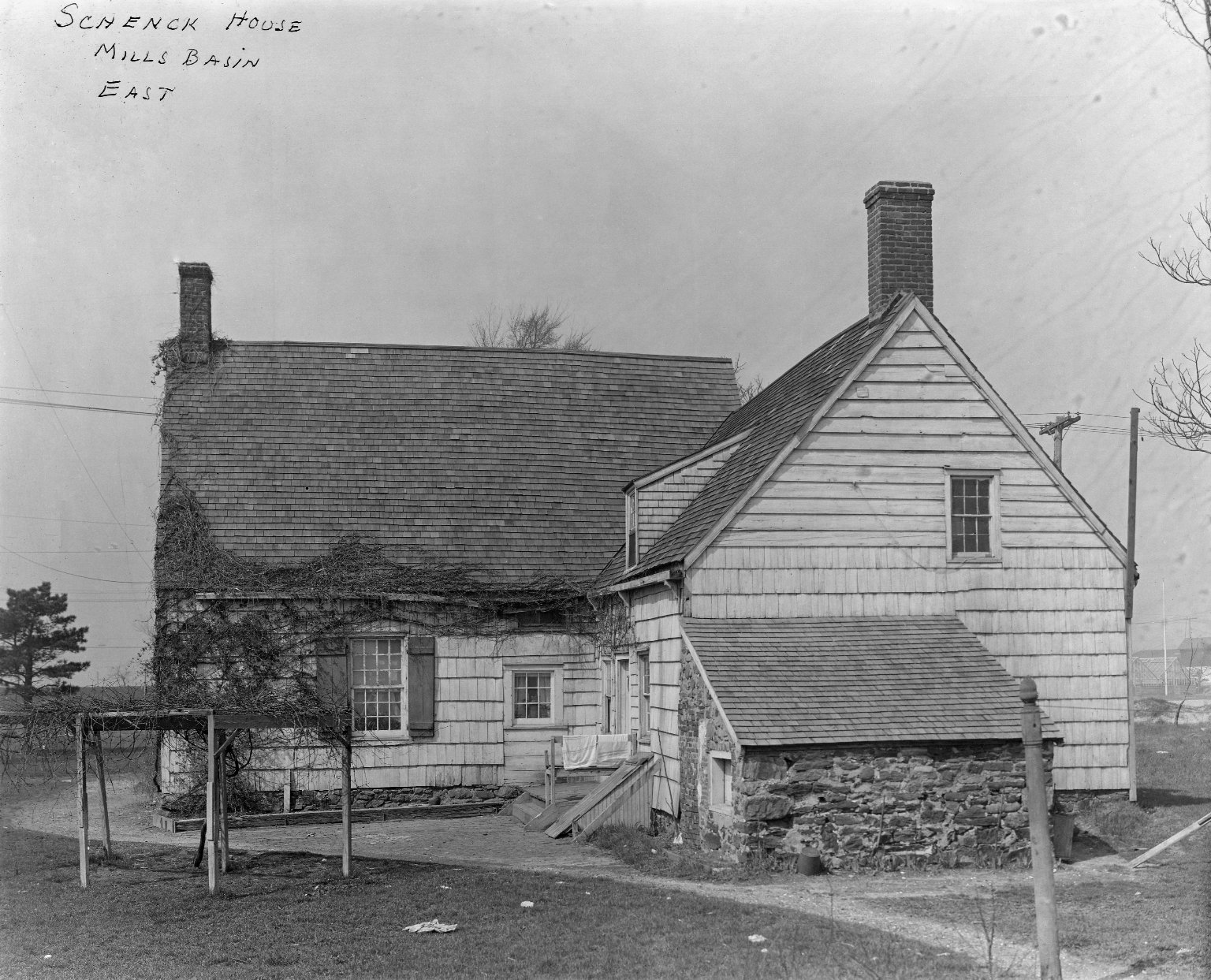
The Jans Martense Schenck house as seen in the 19th century

When Schenck died in 1689, his son Martin received ownership of the estate; the mill was later inherited by Nicholas Schenck. In 1784, the property was sold to Joris Martense of Flatbush. Martense also received "66 acres [27 ha] of uplands, 6 acres [2.4 ha] of woodlands, and a parcel of salt-meadows" in the transaction, as noted in a 1909 history of Brooklyn. By 1794, John Schenck was renting the property from Joris's widow. At the time, the mill was called "the mill of Martensen".

The property, which included the mill, farm, and house, was later conveyed to Susan Caton, the daughter of Joris Martense. Caton named Robert L. Crooke as the trustee for Caton's daughter, Margaret Crooke, who was married to General Philip S. Crooke. In 1818, Margaret Crooke inherited the land. After this conveyance, the mill was called "Crooke's Mill". General Crooke was the trustee for the Crooke children, and upon Margaret's death, had the power to pass the property down to their children. In 1870, after Margaret died, he conveyed the property to Robert, who gave the property back in 1873. Over the next 30 years, there were a dozen more land conveyances and by 1906, Robert Crooke owned the property again.

The name "Mill Island" is believed to have been first used in the late 19th century. Before then, settlers called it "the mill" because of the gristmill there.

=== Industrial development ===
Up to the late 19th century, the area retained its rural character, and the only structures on the island were a house and "three stable" buildings. The chief resources were the abundant crabs, oysters, and clams in Jamaica Bay. In 1890, Robert Crooke built a lead-smelting plant on Mill Island. The Crooke Smelting Company was bought out by the National Lead Company, and Robert sold the remainder of the land to the firm of McNulty and Fitzgerald, which erected bulkheads and filled in the marshes. By 1906, Mill Island reportedly received 4,000 short tons (3,600 t) of ore annually. The island's factories had a combined annual output of 3,800 short tons (3,400 t) of metals whose aggregate value was $1.25 million ($33.5 million in modern dollars). Boats delivered and received shipments via the nearby waterways.

Crooke sold the former mill to Florence C. Smith in January 1906. The day after the sale, Smith deeded it to the real estate company Flatbush East, who transferred the land's ownership to Flatbush Improvement Company at the end of the year. The Flatbush Improvement Company brought marshland and engaged the firm of Atlantic, Gulf and Pacific to dredge creeks and fill in meadows. After the filling project was completed, the parcel had an area of 332 acres (134 ha) and was fit for industrial development. As compensation, Atlantic, Gulf and Pacific acquired ownership of the eastern portion of Mill Island, which comprised about 800 acres (320 ha) of land. Atlantic, Gulf and Pacific built factories and worker housing on its half of the island, and in 1916, began laying sidewalks and utilities. The expanded island attracted companies such as National Lead, Gulf Refining, and other leading firms engaged in heavy industry, which were operating plants along the Mill Island shoreline. Additionally, construction of an extension of Flatbush Avenue to the Rockaway Inlet started in 1913.

In 1910, developers began dredging ports within Jamaica Bay in an effort to develop a seaport district there. Work on dredging a 500-foot-wide (150 m), 18-foot-deep (5.5 m) main ship channel started in 1912 and was completed the next year, but lawsuits delayed progress until the 1920s. The channel ran along the western and northern shores of Jamaica Bay. The first improvements to Mill Island itself started in 1915, when a wooden pier was installed along Flatbush Avenue. In 1916, 12,000 feet (3,700 m) of shoreline along Mill Island was incorporated into the proposed port. At the time, a 2-mile-long (3.2 km), 50-foot-wide (15 m) channel was to be excavated within Mill Basin, the waterway. This new channel would allow a proposed extension of the Flatbush Avenue Streetcar from Avenue N to the Mill Basin shoreline. In 1917 the New York City Department of Docks awarded a contract to dredge the Mill Basin channel, along the southern and western sides of the island, to the federal government. Mill Basin was eventually 1,000 feet (300 m) wide and 15 feet (4.6 m) deep. Work on the main ship channel restarted in 1923. After the entire main channel was dredged to 500 feet wide by 18 feet deep, it was re-dredged to 1,000 feet wide by 30 feet (9.1 m) deep. The project was completed by the late 1930s, eliminating many small islands in the bay and causing the expansion of another island, Canarsie Pol. The eastern branch of Mill Basin was created by the 1930s.

In 1918, the city allowed several large piers to be constructed within the bay, though only one was built. The pier, which was built in order to receive landfill for the other proposed piers, stretched 1 mile (1.6 km) northeast of Barren Island, south of Mill Island, and was 700 feet (210 m) wide. A total of six piers were planned for this area. In June of that year, a 447-foot-long (136 m) municipally owned pier was opened at Mill Basin. At the time, there were proposals to fill in 8,000 acres (3,200 ha) between Mill and Barren Islands so 14 more piers could be built.

By 1919, Atlantic, Gulf and Pacific was building three large dry docks on Mill Island. It was also constructing seven barges for the United States Navy. The fill for the docks came from as far away as Europe. As of that year, Mill Island was the site of at least six manufacturing and commercial concerns. One observer attributed the presence of several of these factories to the proposed improvements at Jamaica Bay. A contract for building concrete piers was awarded in 1921 and completed the next year. In 1925, the Flatbush Avenue extension to Rockaway Inlet opened, providing an additional 2,700 feet (820 m) of dock facilities and a strip of land for a road across the marshes. Construction of the docks started in 1927. During the late 1920s and 1930s, the New York City Department of Docks rented the docks to a number of small industrial firms.

The development of the proposed docklands at Jamaica Bay spurred large increases in property values in Mill Basin, since the docklands was expected to gain a connection to the Long Island Rail Road. Planners wanted to create a spur of the Bay Ridge Branch south to Flatlands, with two branches to Canarsie and Mill Basin. A connection to Staten Island would be built via the planned Staten Island Tunnel, which would in turn allow freight to be delivered and shipped to the rest of the continental United States. The Port Authority of New York and New Jersey offered to build the new railroad link for $2 million and lease it to the city, but Mill Basin's further development was hindered when plans for rail service to the rest of Brooklyn went unrealized. Industrial activity continued through the 1960s.

In 1927, United States Secretary of Commerce Herbert Hoover's "Fact-Finding Committee on Suitable Airport Facilities for the New York Metropolitan District" suggested Southeast Brooklyn as a possible site for a new municipal airport in New York City. The New York City Chamber of Commerce approved the 800-acre (320 ha) site in September of that year. Originally, real-estate developers suggested that 300 acres (120 ha) in Mill Basin could be used for the new airport, which would allow the airfield to open before the end of 1928. Ultimately, New York City's aeronautical engineer Clarence Chamberlin selected nearby Barren Island as the site for the new airport, which later became Floyd Bennett Field.

The Belt Parkway was built through the neighborhood in the 1930s, and it opened in 1940. The construction of a drawbridge along the parkway, traversing Mill Basin, was approved in 1939 and completed the next year.

=== Residential development ===
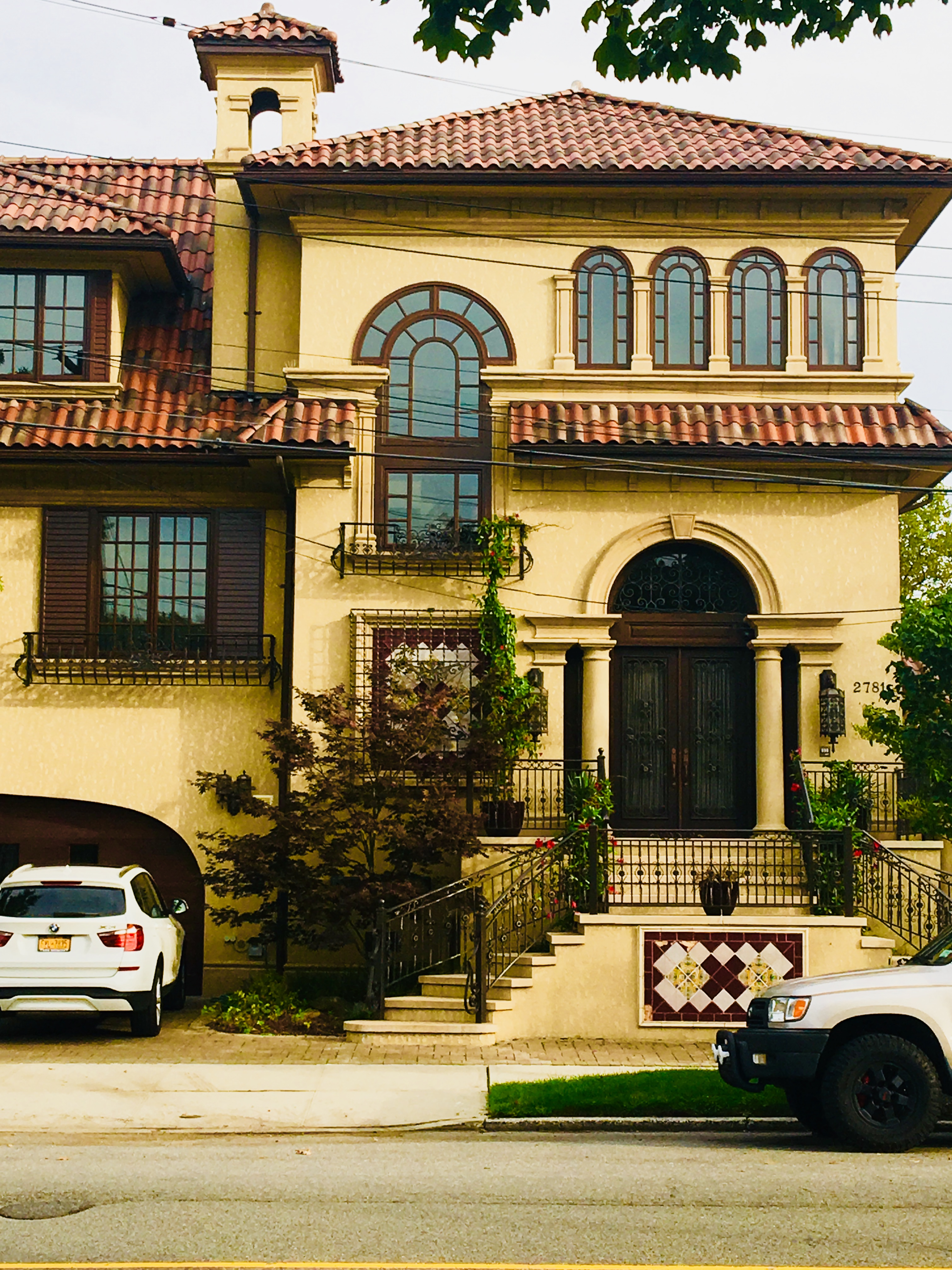
A house in Mill Basin

Old Mill Basin, north of the Mill Basin peninsula, was developed beginning in the 1920s. The 1939 WPA Guide to New York City mentions that the area comprising present-day Mill Basin and Bergen Beach was the residence of "pathetic communities of squatters, who live in makeshift houses, and eke out a living by fishing and scouring the near-by city dumps for odd necessities". At the time, the southern shore was still marshland. Residential development on the peninsula began after World War II, when Atlantic, Gulf and Pacific sold a large plot of land to the firm of Flatbush Park Homes. The land was bounded to the north by Avenue U, to the east by East 68th Street and East Mill Basin/Mill Island, to the south by Basset Avenue, and to the west by Strickland Avenue and Mill Avenue. Over a hundred brick bungalows were built in the late 1940s and early 1950s, many of which were later replaced by big, custom-built, detached one-family houses on lots measuring 50 by 100 feet (15 by 30 m). The Crooke-Schenck House, on East 63rd Street, was dismantled in 1952 and later reassembled as an exhibit at the Brooklyn Museum. Starting in the 1950s, a series of suburban waterfront communities were rapidly developed in Southeast Brooklyn, including present-day Bergen Beach and Canarsie as well as Mill Basin. In 1956, builders announced the construction of 1,500 houses on the Mill Basin peninsula. As late as the 1960s, parts of the area were still a swamp.

During the 1950s, private developers laid their own streets while constructing houses in the neighborhood, resulting in a patchwork of private roads. Some of these streets were poorly maintained: a newspaper article from 1954 described houses that flooded after heavy rains because there were no sewage pipes. In 1963, the city government asked the developers to fix these streets, which were already breaking down. The city argued that the streets would remain private roads until they were upgraded to city standards, but the developers made the opposite argument, saying that the streets were not up to city standards because they were private roads. After a controversy over the paving of the streets, the city ultimately dropped its requests for private builders to pave the streets, instead deciding that the city's Department of Highways would do the paving. The New York City Department of Buildings agreed not to grant any certificates of occupancy to any new building unless the street in front of it was paved. In 1964, a federal judge signed an order that transferred these private streets to city ownership, allowing the city to pave these streets.

The area gained residential popularity by the end of the 1960s. By 1963, the South Shore High School in Canarsie was being constructed to accommodate the growing population. Due to a large number of new residents moving in, temporary classrooms were built on the playground of P.S. 236. A training school for sailors was also constructed in Mill Basin. The neighborhood had some of the most expensive houses in Brooklyn by 1972.

Several controversies arose during the development of Mill Basin as a residential neighborhood. In 1954, the city indefinitely postponed the construction of a garbage incinerator that had been planned for the area. Another controversy in 1966 surrounded a "boatel", or motel with boating docks, that had been planned for the site of a marsh south of the Mill Basin waterway. The boatel site, at the intersection of Belt Parkway and Flatbush Avenue, was supposed to contain a shopping mall with docks for up to 300 boats. Residents opposed plans for the shopping center since it would have been on a wildlife sanctuary. Plans for the mall were scrapped the next year after the city denied a rezoning plan for Mill Basin that would have allowed its construction. Another mall, Kings Plaza, had been dedicated in 1968 at a site further north, on Avenue U.

== Community ==
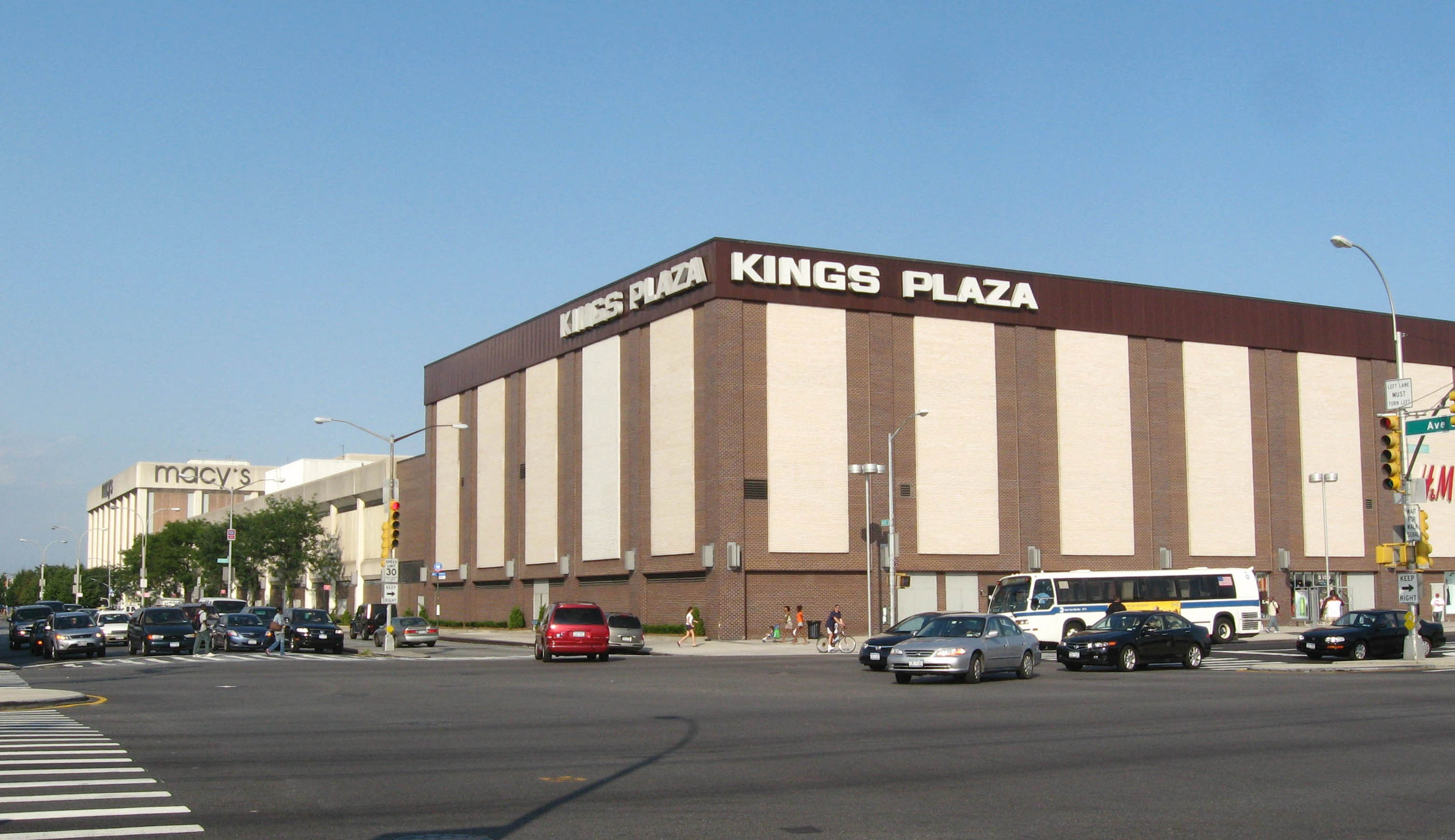
The Kings Plaza shopping mall in Mill Basin

The New York Times has characterized Mill Basin as a suburban community with a nearly-360-degree shoreline. It is adjoined by the waterway of the same name to the south and west. Many residents own boats. Mill Basin is part of Brooklyn Community Board 18, which also includes Canarsie, Bergen Beach, Georgetown, Marine Park, and the southern portion of Flatlands.

The neighborhood has evolved to include some of New York City's most luxurious houses. Most of the housing stock was developed in the late 20th century, and many waterfront houses include docks, water views, or high ceilings. Prices of houses often range in the millions. As of 2017, an unrenovated house on a 40-by-100-foot (12 by 30 m) lot along a main street had a minimum price around $850,000. Housing prices rose based on the width of the lot, extent of renovations, and proximity to the water: the cheapest waterfront house is $1.6 million. A few houses also had elevators, and several had features such as six-car garages and all-glass facades.

In Georgetown, north of Mill Basin, there are two-family brick townhouses with overhanging balconies and awnings. Old Mill Basin, to the northeast, mostly has detached frame houses. It is defined as the portion of the neighborhood north of Avenue U. In Mill Island, the peninsular part of Mill Basin, houses are more expensive than in the rest of the neighborhood; the cheapest houses are in the northwest corner. The former Mill Island and Old Mill Basin are divided by Avenue U, at the Mill Basin waterway's innermost reaches.

Some lead factories, built in the 20th century by Dutch businessmen, remain standing, but many are derelict. Commercial activities, mainly family-owned shops and restaurants, are primarily along Strickland Avenue and Avenue U. The Kings Plaza shopping mall, on a 23-acre (9.3 ha) plot at Avenue U and Flatbush Avenue, is Brooklyn's largest indoor shopping center. The neighborhood also contains Mill Plaza Mall, a strip mall at the northwest corner of Mill and Strickland Avenues.

== Demographics ==
From the 1950s through the 1980s, the area was mainly Italian, but the predominant communities today are Russian and Israeli. By the end of the 20th century, the vast majority of Mill Basin residents were white, as were most residents of adjacent neighborhoods such as Bergen Beach and Marine Park. The 1990 United States census counted 10 African-Americans living in Mill Basin; by the 2000 United States census, there were 26. By 2011, the number of black residents in Southeast Brooklyn had risen 241%, the steepest such increase of any area in the city. As of that year, the African American population in these neighborhoods represented 10.9% of the total population.

Mill Basin is in ZIP Code 11234, which also includes Georgetown, Marine Park, Bergen Beach, and the southern portion of Flatlands. Based on data from the 2010 United States census, the combined population of Georgetown, Marine Park, Bergen Beach, and Mill Basin was 45,231, an increase of 2,291 (5.3%) from the 42,940 counted in the 2000 United States census. Covering an area of 1,662.88 acres (672.94 ha), the neighborhood had a population density of 27.2 inhabitants per acre (17,400/sq mi; 6,700/km^{2}).

As of the 2010 Census, the racial makeup of Southeast Brooklyn was 73.8% (33,399) White, 10.9% (4,952) African American, 0.1% (47) Native American, 5.6% (2,521) Asian, 0.0% (7) Pacific Islander, 0.3% (144) from other races, and 1.3% (578) from two or more races. Hispanic or Latino of any race were 7.9% (3,583) of the population.

== Police and crime ==
Mill Basin is patrolled by the New York City Police Department's 63rd Precinct. The precinct also covers Bergen Beach, Marine Park, and part of Flatlands. The 63rd Precinct ranked 31st safest out of 69 patrol areas for per-capita crime in 2010.

The 63rd Precinct has a lower crime rate than in the 1990s, with crimes across all categories having decreased by 82.7% between 1990 and 2022. The precinct reported 1 murder, 10 rapes, 114 robberies, 170 felony assaults, 119 burglaries, 537 grand larcenies, and 135 grand larcenies auto in 2022.

== Recreation ==
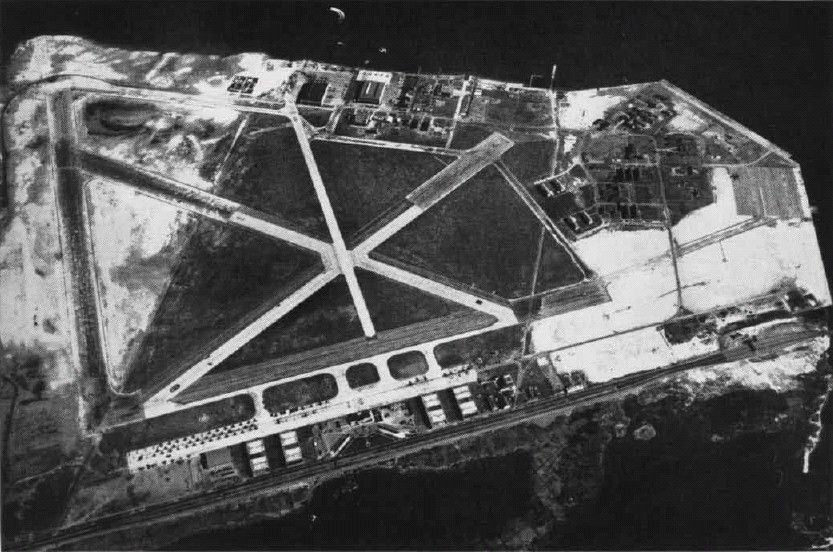
Aerial view of Floyd Bennett Field, located south of Mill Basin, in the 1940s

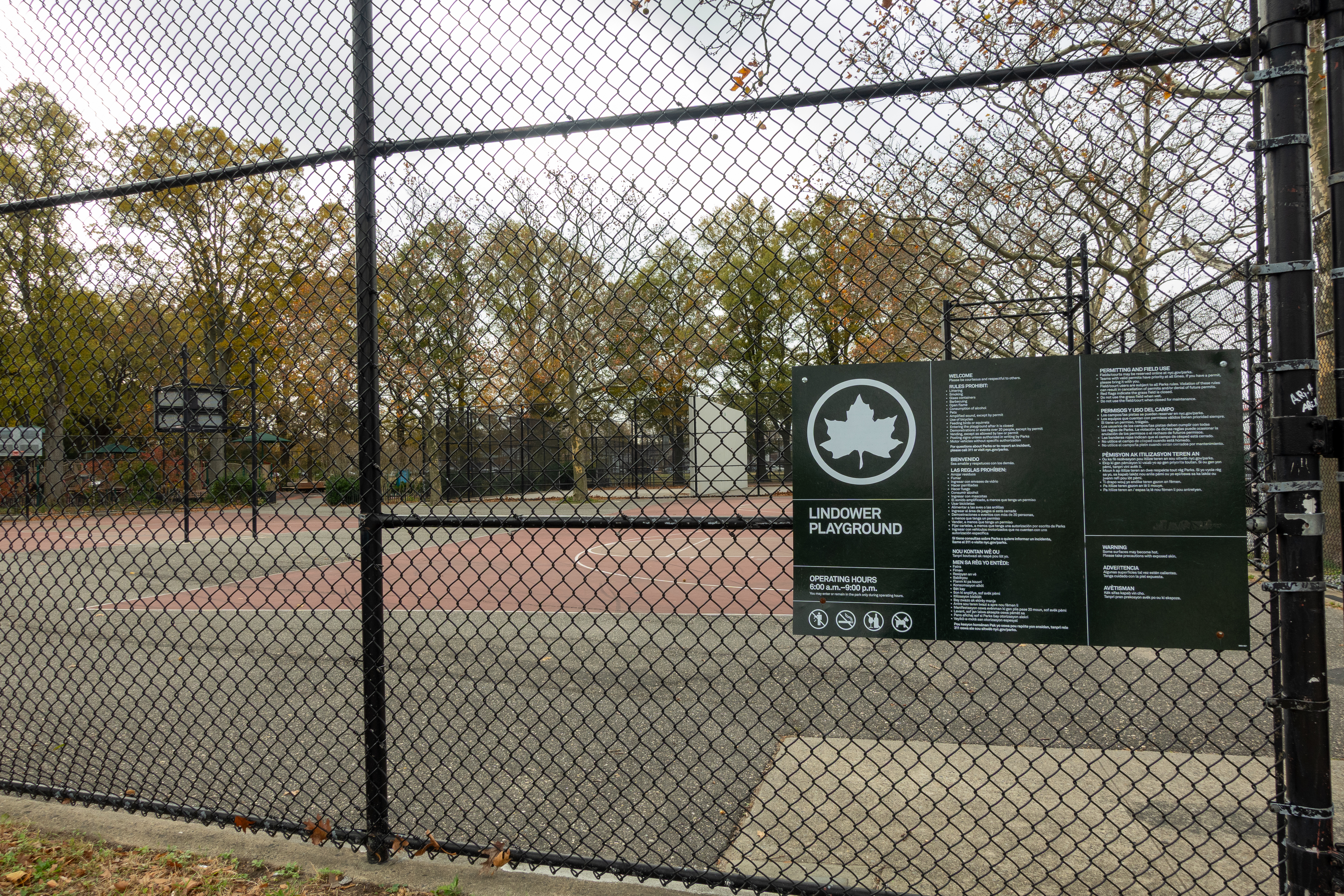
An entrance of Lindower Park in Mill Basin.

There are several parks in Mill Basin. The only park on the peninsula proper is Lindower Park, a 6.7-acre (2.7 ha) park at the southwest corner of Mill and Strickland Avenues. The park is named after Alex Lindower, a lawyer and community activist who lived in Mill Basin. The city bought the land in 1959 and made it into a public park in 1963, the year before Lindower died. It contains baseball fields, basketball and handball courts, and a children's playground.

There are two smaller parks in Old Mill Basin. The James Marshall Power Playground, at Avenue N and Utica Avenue, is a frequent gathering point for softball teams. The Monsignor Crawford Athletic Field, on Avenue U between East 58th and East 60th Streets, contains two baseball fields. It is named after Monsignor Thomas J. Crawford, the first pastor of the Mary Queen of Heaven Church, four blocks north of the ballfields. Mill Basin is also adjacent to Floyd Bennett Field, to the immediate south of Mill Basin, across the Belt Parkway and Mill Basin Inlet. Named after aviator Floyd Bennett, the field was formerly the city's first municipal airport, and is now part of the Gateway National Recreation Area.

The bowler Lou Seda purchased the Gil Hodges Lanes, a bowling alley in Mill Basin, in 2009. It was then rebranded into a new bowling alley called Strike 10 Lanes, which as of 2012 was one of Brooklyn's few remaining bowling alleys.

== Education ==
The New York City Department of Education operates several schools in the neighborhood, including P.S. 312, P.S. 236, and P.S. 203, all of which have historically ranked among the city's top public schools.

There are several private schools around Mill Basin, such as the Yeshivah of Crown Heights, the Mary Queen of Catholic Academy and St. Bernard Catholic Academy. The Roman Catholic Diocese of Brooklyn operates Catholic schools in that borough. Mary Queen of Heaven Catholic Academy was in the Mill Basin area, but closed in 2019 after falling into debt. The Canarsie Courier stated that St. Bernard was the closest remaining Catholic school.

Brooklyn Public Library operates the Mill Basin Library at 2385 Ralph Avenue, near Avenue N. The Mill Basin Library first opened in 1940, and it has been in its current building since 1975.

== Transportation ==
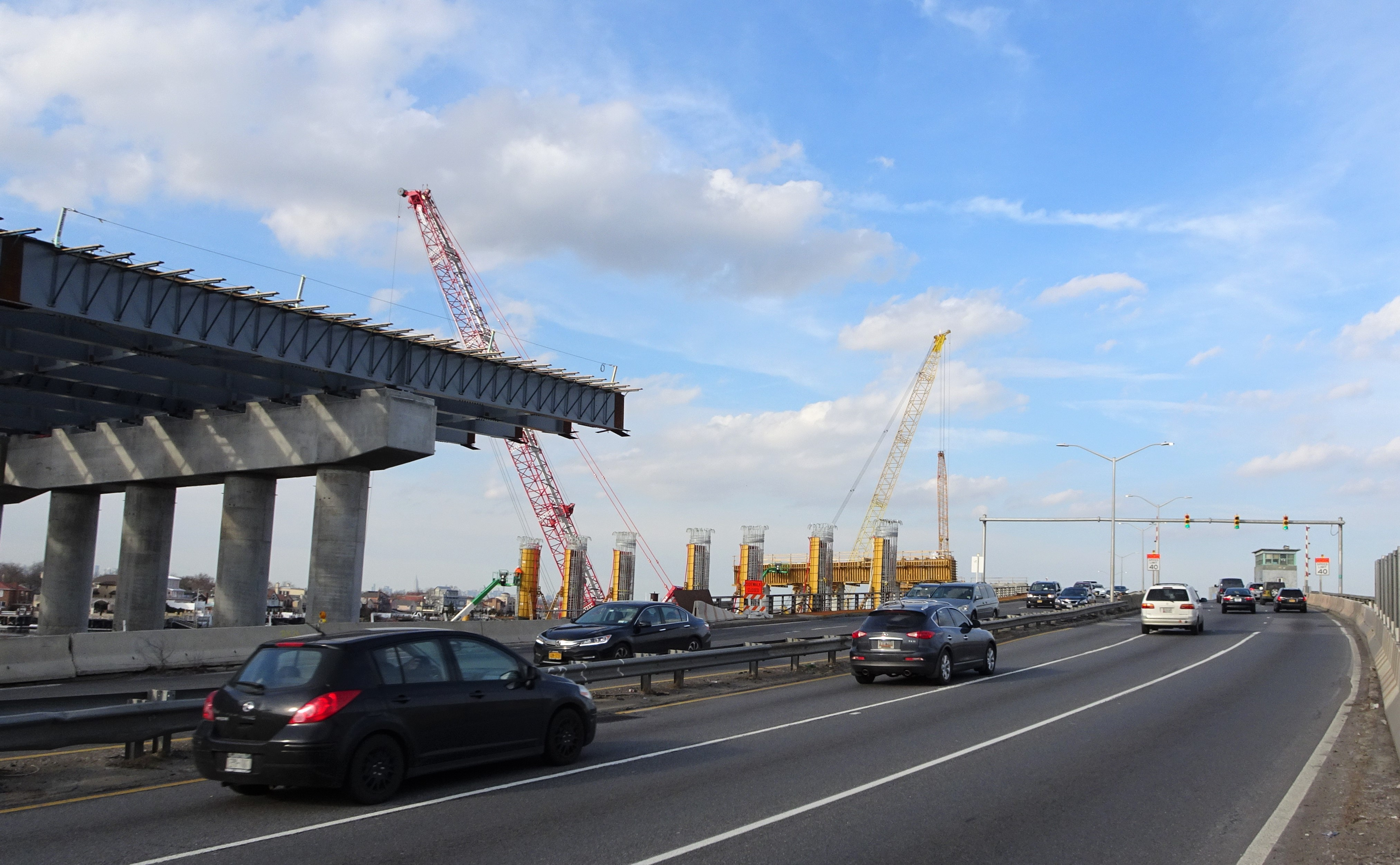
Mill Basin Bridge replacement work

Mill Basin is served by the B2, B3, B9, B41, B46, B46 SBS, B47, B100, BM1 and Q35 bus routes, operated by MTA Regional Bus Operations. There are no New York City Subway stations in the neighborhood; the closest is the Kings Highway station in Midwood, serving the B and Q trains. A survey in 2014 found that Mill Basin was among the neighborhoods in Brooklyn that were the furthest from the subway; out of all homes in Brooklyn, one house in Mill Basin was the furthest from any subway. BM1 express bus service to Manhattan started in 1973, mainly as a result of the area's isolation from the subway.

The Mill Basin Bridge is a vital component of the Belt Parkway and Jamaica Bay Greenway connecting the southern coastlines of Brooklyn and Queens. Originally built in 1940 as a drawbridge, it was reconstructed between 2015 and 2019. The modern bridge has two parallel fixed spans with a clearance of 60 feet (18 m) above Mean High Water.

Throughout the mid-20th century, there was a seaplane base, Brooklyn Skyport, near Avenue U and Flatbush Avenue, around the present-day site of the Kings Plaza Marina. It consisted of a single hangar, takeoff area, and landing ramp. The airport could fit eight seaplanes at a time. It was heavily used during Prohibition in the late 1920s and early 1930s, when seaplanes and ships exchanged cargo. Brooklyn Skyport operated until at least 1947. By 1950, the site was apparently being used as an aviation school.

Mill Basin Inlet contains a navigable channel allowing access to the area's multiple marinas. The inlet's eastern branch was dredged in the 1930s, and the western branch was widened.

== Religion ==
There are numerous houses of worship in Mill Basin, including ten synagogues. Some of these have been converted from residential structures.

== Notable people ==
- Frank Bisignano (born 1959), businessman and chairman/CEO of First Data
- Keith Caputo (born 1973), singer best known as the lead vocalist and a founding member of New York City alternative metal band Life of Agony
- Meade Esposito (1907–1993), longtime Chairman of the Kings County Democratic Committee and major party boss
- Norman Finkelstein (born 1953), political scientist, activist, professor and author
- Jimmy Kimmel (born 1967), comedian, grew up in Mill Basin
- Carmine Lombardozzi (1913–1992), high-ranking member of the Gambino crime family

== See also ==
- List of Brooklyn neighborhoods
- Geography of New York City
