= Conover =

Conover may refer to:

== People ==
- Conover (surname)

== Places in the United States ==
- Conover, Iowa, a ghost town
- Conover, North Carolina, a city
- Conover, Ohio, an unincorporated community
- Conover, Wisconsin, a town
- Conover (community), Wisconsin, an unincorporated community
