= Brooklyn Community Board 18 =

Brooklyn Community District 18
- Community District
- Country: United States
- State: New York
- City: New York City
- Borough: Brooklyn
- Neighborhoods: List: Bergen Beach; Canarsie; Flatlands; Marine Park; Mill Basin

Government
  - Chairperson: Saul Needle
  - District Manager: Sue Ann Partnow

Area
  - Total: 8.5 sq mi (22 km^{2})

Population (2010)
  - Total: 193,543
  - Density: 23,000/sq mi (8,800/km^{2})

Ethnicity
  - African-American: 62.5%
  - Asian: 4.7%
  - Hispanic and Latino Americans: 8.2%
  - White: 22.8%
  - Others: 1.7%
- Time zone: UTC−5 (Eastern)
  - Summer (DST): UTC−4 (EDT)
- ZIP codes: 11234, 11236
- Area code: 718, 347, 929, and 917
- Police Precincts: 63rd (website); 69th (website)

Brooklyn Community Board 18 is a New York City community board that encompasses the Brooklyn neighborhoods of Canarsie, Bergen Beach, Mill Basin, Flatlands, Marine Park, Georgetown, and Mill Island. It is delimited by Nostrand Avenue on the west, the Long Island Rail Road on the north, Van Sinderen Avenue and Louisiana Avenue on the east, as well as by Shore Parkway on the south.

Its current chairman is Saul Needle, and its district manager Sue Ann Partnow.

As of the United States Census, 2000, the Community Board has a population of 194,653 up from 162,428 in 1990 and 169,093 in 1980.

Of them (as of 2000), 67,303 (34.6%) are White non Hispanic, 98,714 (50.7%) are African-American, 7,203 (3.7%) Asian or Pacific Islander, 254 (0.1%) American Indian or Native Alaskan, 854 (0.4%) of some other race, 4,469 (2.3%) of two or more race, 15,886 (8.2%) of Hispanic origins.

21.6% of the population benefit from public assistance as of 2004, up from 10.9% in 2000.

The land area is 6,100.5 acres (24.688 km^{2}).
