= Kouwenhoven =

Kouwenhoven is a Dutch toponymic surname Notable people with the surname include:

- Ben Kouwenhoven (born 1965), Dutch sailor, twin brother of Jan
- Elly Kouwenhoven (born 1949), Dutch politician
- Ernest Kouwen-Hoven (1875–1940), Dutch-born founder of Indialantic, Florida
- Guus Kouwenhoven (born 1942), Dutch national who stood trial for arms smuggling and war crimes in Liberia
- Jan Kouwenhoven (born 1965), Dutch competitive sailor, twin brother of Ben
- Leo Kouwenhoven (born 1963), Dutch physicist
- Marisca Kouwenhoven (born 1976), Dutch chess master
- Mike Kouwenhoven (born 1959), Canadian-born Dutch ice hockey player
- William B. Kouwenhoven (1886–1975), American electrical engineer and co-inventor of CPR
- Wolfert Gerritse van Couwenhoven (1579–1662), Dutch settler in America in 1625; a founder of the New Netherland colony

== See also ==
- Coudenhove-Kalergi, Bohemian family. The Dutch part of the surname has the same origin and meaning as Kouwenhoven
