= Steven van Voorhees =

Dutch settler in America (1600–1684)

Steven Coertse van Voorhees
- Van Voorhees coat of arms
- Born: Steven Coertse van Voorhees; 1600; Hees, Drenthe, The Netherlands
- Died: 16 February 1684 (aged 83–84); Flatlands, Brooklyn, New York
- Occupations: Farmer, brewer
- Spouse(s): Aaltjen Wessels (d. about 1645), Willempie Roelofse Suebering (b.1619-d.1690)
- Children: Coert van Voorhees, Wessel, Marchien, Lucas, Hendrickje, Jan, Aeltje, Albert, Jannetje, Abraham
- Parent: Coert Albertse van Voorhees

Steven Coertse van Voorhees (1600 – 16 February 1684) was an early Dutch settler in America and the patriarch of the Van Voorhees and Voorhees family lines as well as related namesakes. In 1664, he was appointed magistrate of what is now Flatlands. He is noted as the founder of the Dutch Reformed Church in present-day Flatlands, Brooklyn.

== Biography ==
=== Early life ===
Steven van Voorhees was born in 1600 in Hees, a hamlet in Drenthe, The Netherlands. He was the son of Coert Albertse van Voorhees, of Hees, and the youngest of seven children. He married his first wife circa 1630.

=== New Netherland colony ===
Van Voorhees left The Netherlands in April, 1660, along with his wife, Willempie Roelofse Seubering, and 8 of their 10 children.

Records indicate the family immigrated to the New Netherland settlement on either the ship "Bontekoe" (translated, the "Spotted Cone", which means the "Spotted Cow.") Some sources indicate that the name of his first wife is unknown. Others specify that her name was Aaltjen Wessels, who died around 1645.

Van Voorhees migrated to the Dutch colony of New Netherlands (present-day New York) in 1660, settling in Nieuw Amersfoort (present-day Flatlands), Long Island. He purchased a tract of land on 29 November 1660, from Cornelius Deriksen Hoogland for three thousand guilders. Of the nine morgen of corn land, seven morgen of salt meadow, seven morgen of woodland and ten morgen of plain land, the plot included a house and house plot, as well as brewery, which he operated.

In addition to being a farmer, Van Voorhees was a magistrate of the Flatlands in 1664. His name appears on a 1664 and a 1667 land patent. He founded the Dutch Reformed Church in Flatlands, and he and his second wife were members of the congregation.

=== Death ===
His will is dated 25 August 1677, which has been called a "lengthy, odd document" in which he bequeaths his entire estate to his five surviving children. In 1683, he was manager of taxes in Flatlands.

Steven van Voorhees died 16 February 1684.

== Name origin and variants ==
The name "Voorhees" is the anglicised form of "van voor Hees" which means from "before" or "in front of" Hees, a small village of about 9 houses and 50 inhabitants 1.25 miles (2 km) south of Ruinen.

Steven van Voorhees' father, Coert van voor Hees, resided near the front of the hamlet of Hees.

== Legacy ==
The van Voorhees have a family coat of arms, which was first published in America in 1880 by Elias W. van Voorhees.

Steven van Voorhees is considered the patriarch of a "pioneer family of Bergen County," and is considered the "founder," as well as the first American representative of the well-known Voorhees family line.

Among his namesakes is Voorhies Avenue in Brooklyn.

== Sources ==
- Aitken, William Benford (1912). Distinguished Families in America, Descended from Wilhelmus Beekman and Jan Thomasse Van Dyke. Knickerbocker Press. p. 266. OCLC 4238467.
- Baughman, Abraham J. (1911). History of Seneca County, Ohio: A Narrative Account of Its Historical Progress, Its People, and Its Principal Interests. Vol. 2. Lewis Publishing Company. p. 969. OCLC 807045.
- Beers, J. H. (1897). Commemorative biographical record of the counties of Dutchess and Putnam, New York. p. 1159. OCLC 15743355.
- Bernardo, Leonard (2006). Brooklyn by Name. NYU Press. p. 256. ISBN 978-0-8147-9946-8.
- Brown, T. Robins (2000). The Architecture of Bergen County, New Jersey: The Colonial Period to the Twentieth Century. Rutgers University Press. p. 264. ISBN 978-0-8135-2867-0.
- Harvey, Cornelius Burnham (1900). Genealogical history of Hudson and Bergen counties, New Jersey. New Jersey Genealogical Publishing Co. p. 617.
- Lineage Book. Vol. 18. The Daughters. 1974. OCLC 1565970.
- Lee, Francis Bazley (1907). Genealogical and Personal Memorial of Mercer County, New Jersey. Vol. 1. Lewis Publishing Company. p. 432. OCLC 2920024.
- Biographical and Genealogical History of Morris County, New Jersey. Lewis Publishing Company. 1899. p. 808. ISBN 978-1-230-07650-8. OCLC 20473027.
- Netherlands Zone Handbook: Gelderland, Overijssel, Drenthe, Groningen and Friesland.no. 3. Gelderland. Ministry of Economic Warfare. 1944. OCLC 62624077.
- Starr Myers, William (1945). The Story of New Jersey. Vol. 4. Lewis Historical Publishing Company. OCLC 1116219.
- Voorhees, Amos Earle (1939). The John C. Voorheis branch of the Van Voorhees family in America. The Daily Courier. p. 71. OCLC 12772140.
- The Van Voorhees family in America: the first six generations. Van Voorhees Association. 2000. p. 1029. OCLC 608776468.
