= Hendrick I. Lott House =

Historic house in Brooklyn, New York

- U.S. National Register of Historic Places
- New York State Register of Historic Places
- New York City Landmark
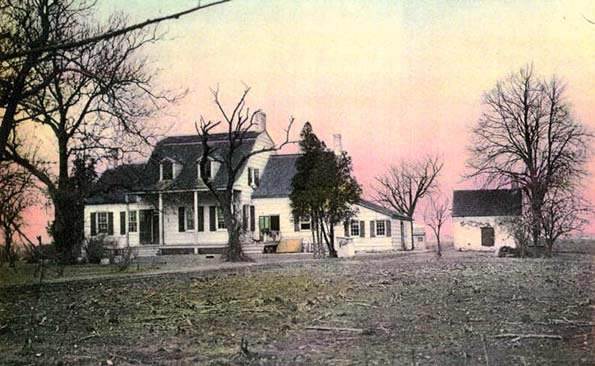

- Location within New York City Location within New York Location within the United States
- Location: 1940 East 36th Street, Brooklyn, New York
- Coordinates: 40°36′37″N 73°55′58″W
- Built: 1720
- Architect: Hendrick I. Lott
- Architectural style: Colonial
- NRHP reference No.: 83004645
- NYSRHP No.: 04701.013546
- NYCL No.: 1705

Significant dates
- Added to NRHP: March 3, 1994
- Designated NYSRHP: August 8, 1983
- Designated NYCL: October 3, 1989

The Hendrick I. Lott House is a historic home located at 1940 East 36th Street between Fillmore Avenue and Avenue S, in Marine Park, Brooklyn, New York City. Lott House, one of the oldest Dutch Colonial houses in Brooklyn, is listed on the National Register of Historic Places and is a New York City designated landmark. The house remains structurally sound and virtually unchanged from the time Hendrick Lott constructed it in 1800, incorporating a section of the 1720 original homestead built by his grandfather, Johannes Lott.

== History ==
=== 18th and 19th centuries ===
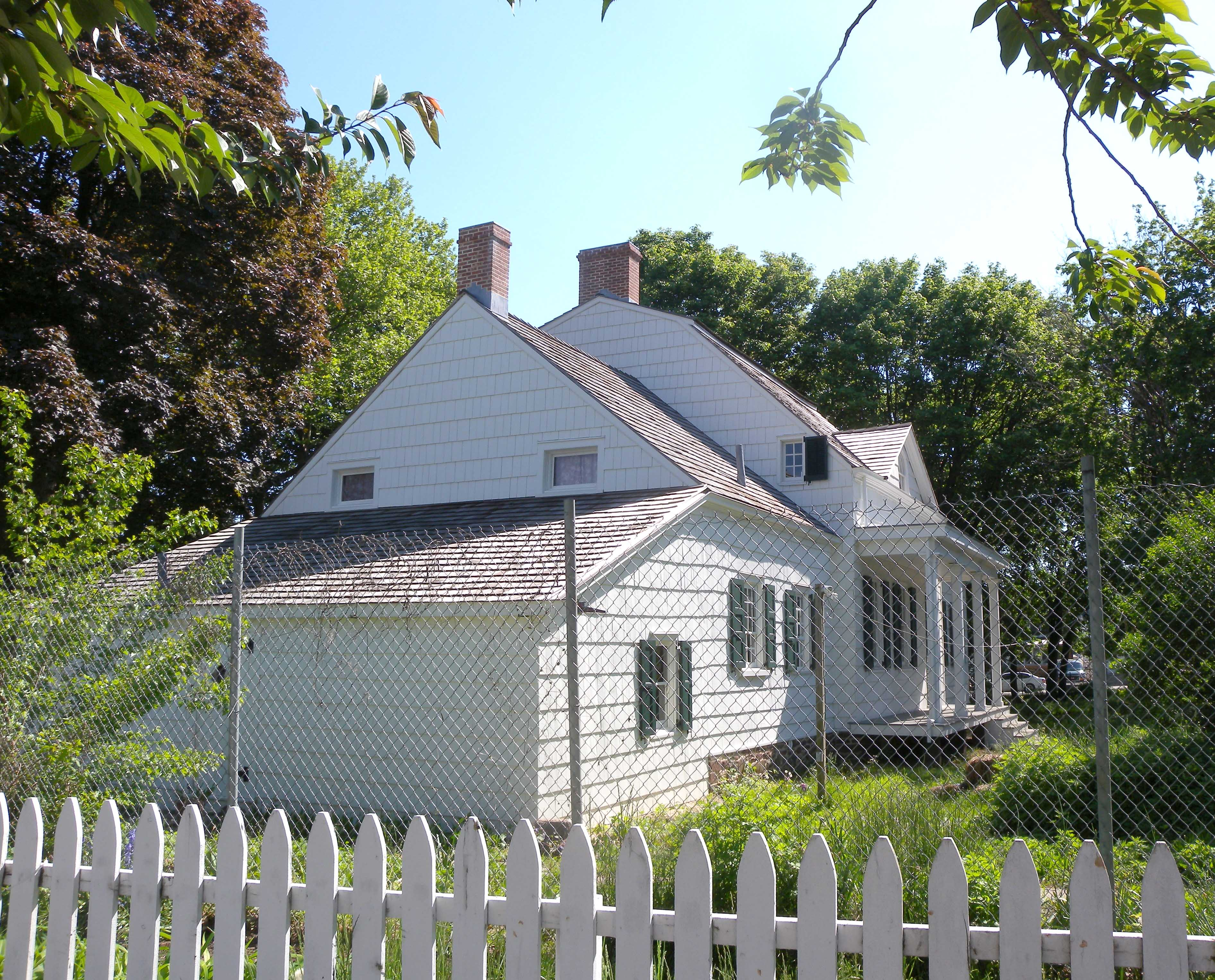
The Lott house under restoration

Family patriarch Johannes Lott, a member of the New York Colonial Assembly, purchased land from Coert Van Voorhees in the rural area of Flatlands in 1719 to use for farming. Lott expanded the family holdings from Kings Highway south to Jamaica Bay and "Lott's Landing." On this property, Johannes built his homestead just east of the present house. Johannes died in 1775, leaving the farm to Johannes Jr., who occupied the property until 1792.

The Lott family quickly became leaders in the area. When Hendrick I. Lott married Mary Brownjohn in 1792, he found his grandfather's house was too small, too old, and too outmoded for an established member of a prominent family. Hendrick built a larger, grander house, combining Dutch architecture with that of the English, making it into a distinctly American building. Hendrick did not abandon his grandfather's house entirely, however. Moved to the eastern end of the new house, and it served as the kitchen wing. He balanced this 1720 wing with a west wing, creating a symmetrical composition. Although Hendrick added Federal-style dormer windows, the gambrel roof with graceful spring eaves is typical of the Dutch colonial architectural style. The interior features 18 rooms organized in a center hall plan.

In the 19th century, at its peak, the Lotts’ farm included more than 200 acres (0.81 km^{2}). Like most large farmers in southern Kings County, the Lotts relied heavily on the labor of slaves to grow the crops that they sold in the markets of Brooklyn and Manhattan. They held the most slaves in the neighborhood. Legal documents from 1803 showed that elders, who were inefficient field workers, were less valued than children and adults. After 1799 however, the value of all slaves began to decline. New York wanted to free male slaves born after July 4, 1799, who had served their masters until age 28. Females, on the other hand, would be freed by the age of 25 if they met the same qualifications. These actions by the state made holding slaves more difficult. Therefore, the Lotts freed all but one of their slaves by 1805, long before the abolition of slavery in New York State in 1827. The Lotts then hired the freed slaves back as paid workers. These actions taken by the Lotts support the claim that they were abolitionists. Later, it is said, the House may have served as a stop on the Underground Railroad.

By 1825 the 200-acre (0.81 km^{2}) farm, on which the Lotts raised cabbage, potatoes, vegetables, and wheat, included outbuildings, barns, and a separate stone kitchen. The kitchen foundation, located between the home and the present East 36th Street, was excavated in 1998 by the Brooklyn College Archaeological Research Center.

=== Later use ===
For two centuries, descendants of the Lotts lived in the homestead and used the land for farming. The last farmer, John Bennett Lott, died in 1923. Most of the land was sold, leaving only three-quarters of an acre (0.3 ha) surrounding the house. The last Lott descendant to live there, Ella Suydam, a great-great-great-great-granddaughter of Johannes Lott, lived in the house until she died in 1989.

Ph.D. candidates who grew up in the neighborhood found windowless rooms inside the house. They believed that slaves had slept in those rooms. Below the floors of those rooms, they found corncobs in star or cross shapes and other spiritual objects that showed mutual religious practices between slaves who worked there and Africans in West Africa. These spiritual objects were believed to serve the purpose of connecting the two worlds of the living and the dead.

Now the Hendrick I. Lott House sits at its original location on three-quarters of an acre (0.3 ha) of land. The house was bought by the New York City Department of Parks & Recreation in 2001 and is operated by the Hendrick I. Lott House Preservation Association, and is a member of the Historic House Trust. Restoration of the structural skeleton and the roof began in the mid-2000s, and the restoration of the interior was set to commence in 2019. The restoration of the Lott House is a joint effort of the City of New York/Parks & Recreation, Historic House Trust of New York City, Marine Park Civic Association, and Hendrick I. Lott House Preservation Association.

During the restoration, the house was occasionally opened to the public; visitors were encouraged to check out the "closet that is believed to have been a temporary haven for slaves escaping along the Underground Railroad". In February 2025, media sources reported that the Lott House would be converted into a historic house museum. Mitchell Giurgola was hired to renovate the house, which was to undergo structural repairs and interior restoration beginning in 2026.

== See also ==
- Jans Martense Schenck house
- Vander Ende-Onderdonk House Site
- Abraham Manee House
- List of New York City Designated Landmarks in Brooklyn
- National Register of Historic Places listings in Kings County, New York
