= Bergen Beach, Brooklyn =

Neighborhood in New York City

Bergen Beach
- Neighborhood of Brooklyn
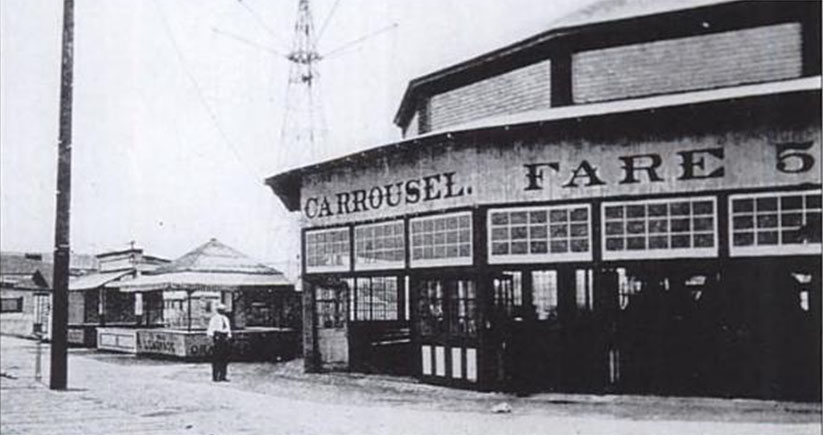
- Carousel of the former Bergen Beach Amusement Park in 1905
- Etymology: Hans Hansen Bergen, an early settler
- Interactive map of Bergen Beach
- Coordinates: 40.620°N 73.907°W
- Country: United States
- State: (New York (state)) New York
- City: New York City
- Borough: Brooklyn
- Community District: Brooklyn 18

Population (2010)
  - Total: 45,231
- Neighborhood tabulation area; includes Mill Basin, Bergen Beach, Marine Park, and Flatlands

Ethnicity
  - White: 73.8%
  - Black: 10.9
  - Hispanic: 7.9
  - Asian: 5.6
  - Other: 1.8
- ZIP Code: 11234
- Area codes: 718, 347, 929, and 917

Bergen Beach is a residential neighborhood in the borough of Brooklyn, New York City. It is located on a peninsula abutting Jamaica Bay in the southeastern portion of the borough, and is bordered by Mill Basin and the neighborhood of the same name to the south and west; the neighborhood of Flatlands to the northwest; Paerdegat Basin and the neighborhood of Canarsie to the northeast; and Jamaica Bay and the Belt Parkway to the east. Bergen Beach contains a sub-neighborhood named Georgetown. The vast majority of residents are white, and the neighborhood generally has a suburban quality.

Bergen Beach was originally an island. The Canarsie Indians who occupied the area referred to it as Winnipague. The island was renamed Bergen Island for early settler Hans Hansen Bergen. From 1896 to 1919, Percy G. Williams and Thomas Adams operated an amusement park in the area. Bergen Beach was connected to the rest of Brooklyn via landfill by 1918, although development did not come for many years. In the 1960s, a housing development called "Georgetowne" was proposed for Bergen Beach, but it was never built due to opposition from local residents. As a result, much of Bergen Beach was not fully developed until the 1990s.

Bergen Beach is part of Brooklyn Community District 18, and its primary ZIP Code is 11234. It is patrolled by the 63rd Precinct of the New York City Police Department.

== Geography ==
Originally, Bergen Beach was an island in Jamaica Bay off the coast of Canarsie, called "Bergen Island" or "Bergen's Island". Most of the island was sea-level meadows, but 60 acres (24 ha) of the island were uplands, or hilly areas located above sea level. The sea-level meadows were replete with shell middens, or mounds, harvested from univalves and bivalves caught in Jamaica Bay. A bulkhead was built along the shore in the late 1890s, and was later connected to the uplands of nearby Mill Basin. This created a continuous embankment between Mill Basin and Paerdegat Basin, which was later used for the construction of Belt Parkway.

Bergen Island was connected to the mainland by 1918, when the marshland was filled in, though some sources state that the island was connected to the mainland by 1911. More fill was added in the 1980s. This fill was unstable, and as a result, parts of Bergen Beach have been sinking. Many homes in the area were built so that if the ground in front of the house sank, extra steps could be added. The sinking land is particularly pronounced in some parts of Bergen Beach, where minor rainfall or snow melt can cause ponding and flooding in the streets.

The modern neighborhood of Bergen Beach is adjacent to Canarsie and Paerdegat Basin to the northeast, Flatlands to the west, Mill Basin to the southwest, and Jamaica Bay to the southeast. The website Forgotten NY delineates the boundaries of Bergen Beach as Paerdegat Basin to the northeast, Ralph and Mill Avenues to the west, Avenue U and the Little Mill Basin waterway to the southwest, and Jamaica Bay to the southeast. Google Maps defines the boundaries similarly, except that Veterans Avenue, instead of Avenue U, forms part of the southwestern boundary. Georgetown is considered a subsection of Bergen Beach. It is bounded by Ralph Avenue to the west, Avenue N to the south, Avenue U to the southeast, and Paerdegat Basin to the northeast. Both Bergen Beach and Georgetown are zoned as predominantly residential neighborhoods with one- or two-family residences. Small commercial overlays and recreational waterfront uses also exist, and a strip along Bergen Basin is zoned for light industrial uses.

== History ==
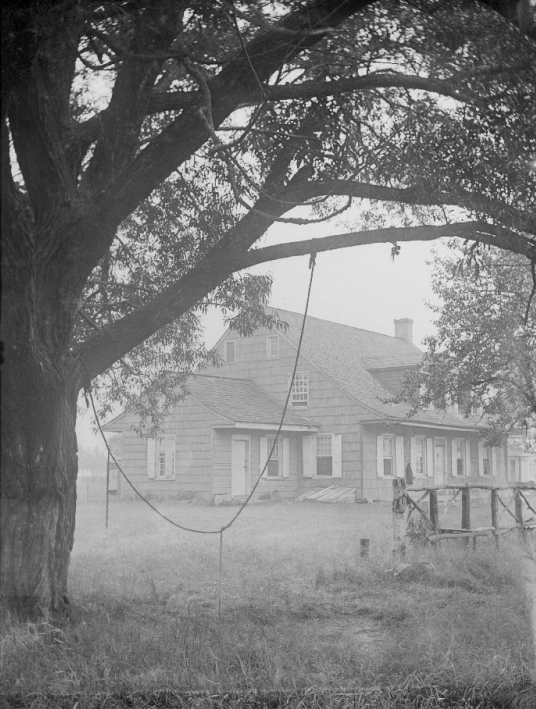
Historic image of the Bergen House

=== Early settlement ===
The coastal lands around Jamaica Bay, including present-day Bergen Beach, were originally settled by the Canarsie Indians. At the time, the Native Americans referred to Bergen Island as "Winnipague" or "Winnippague". The Canarsie Indians also called the island "Wimbaco", a name meaning "fine water place". The Native Americans likely used Bergen Island to create wampum. This location may have been chosen because it was easy to defend: the Indians could see intruders from the uplands and form a line of defense across the narrow flat that led to the island. Through the 20th century, the shell middens that resulted from the wampum-making process were used to create roads, as well as for fertilizer. Remnants of Native American activity on the island, including stone markings, conch shell beds, and broken arrow tips, could be seen through the mid-20th century. Bergen Island may also have contained fields that the Indians used for planting. There were collectively three planting fields on Bergen Island and in Canarsie.

In 1624, the Dutch Republic incorporated much of the current New York City area into the colony of New Netherland. In 1636, as the Dutch were expanding outward from present-day Manhattan, Dutch settlers founded the town of Achtervelt (later Amersfoort) and purchased 15,000 acres (6,100 ha) around Jamaica Bay. Amersfoort was centered around the present-day intersection of Flatbush Avenue and Flatlands Avenue. The Dutch also founded a trading post on Bergen Island, which they renamed "Mentelaer's Island". Ownership of Bergen Island was granted to John Underhill in 1646, and Underhill soon sold the property to others. New Netherland became British New York in 1664, and Amersfoort was renamed Flatlands. Bergen Island, as well as nearby Mill Island and Barren Island, were part of the Town of Flatlands. A settler named Elbert Elbertse bought Bergen Island in 1665, and by the 1670s, all three islands were leased by Elbertse. When he died in 1686, he bequeathed 60 acres (24 ha) of the island to his son.

The island was known as "Winnipague" through the 18th century. By the turn of the century, it had been renamed for Hans Hansen Bergen, an early Norwegian or Dutch settler of New Netherland. He lived in the Bergen House, which was built sometime before 1800. One story has it that Bergen's house was hit by British bombs during the American Revolutionary War, but this is not supported by documentation. Another rumor, that the American spy Nathan Hale was executed near or on Bergen Island, is also refuted by other evidence.

By the 1850s, Cornelius Bergen owned a farm on the island along the Jamaica Bay coast. However, Bergen Island remained largely undeveloped until the end of the century. According to an 1870 map, John C. Bergen owned most of the island, which only had two structures and a dirt road.

=== Amusement park ===
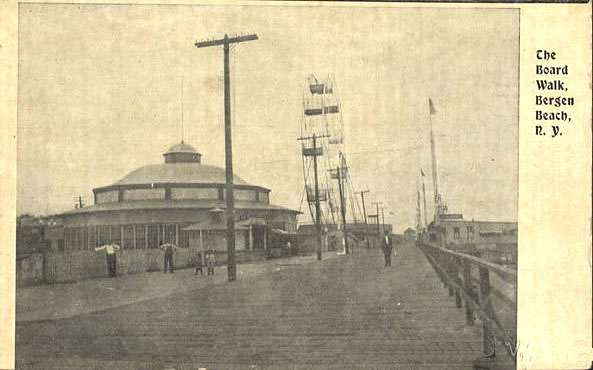
Boardwalk of Bergen Beach, circa 1905

In the late 1880s, vaudeville theater manager Percy G. Williams partnered with Thomas Adams, the chewing gum magnate, to buy 300 acres (120 ha) of marshland on Bergen Island. The island was sold to the Germania Real Estate and Improvement Company in 1892. It quickly laid out streets between Avenues T and Z, east of present-day East 70th Street.

Williams and Adams had meant to construct housing, but instead decided to emulate the successful Coney Island resort further west. They converted Bergen Island into a resort, which was connected to the rest of the city by the Flatbush Avenue streetcar route (now the B41 bus). The resort opened in 1893 with a dance hall, concessions, rides and a pier. The Flatbush Avenue streetcar to Bergen Beach started operating in May 1896. The coast of Bergen Island, and the park itself, came to be known as "Bergen Beach". In August 1896, the New York Herald characterized the "brightly caparisoned and gilded resort" at Bergen Beach:

The board walk echoes with the tread of Egyptian dancing girls, Irish villagers, knights in armor, girls in clinging lace costumes, young men in white duck trousers, soubrettes adorned with yellow tresses, jugglers, mountebanks, opera singers, and Frankfurter sausage venders. The Casino is for dining either inside or on the veranda; steak or raw clams. Inside you can watch the soubrettes sing and dance. There are annexes to the Casino on either end of the boardwalk where they sell drinks; hard and soft. The intervening gulfs (along the Boardwalk) are filled with Moorish castles, Egyptian encampments, Irish villages, black Americans, white Coney Island fakirs, blood testing machines, vitascopes, knock-the-baby-down skill games.

The report went on to describe the Irish Village, Mystic Moorish Maze, Egyptian encampment, scenic railway and other attractions. There were also bathing facilities, exhibits, sideshows, eating places and a beer garden. The park had a "casino", which at the time meant a place where entertainments were staged. The casino put on vaudeville, musical comedies and stock company productions. The Trocadero Theatre was also located on the Bergen Beach boardwalk.

In March 1902, the Brooklyn Rapid Transit Company offered to buy the Bergen Beach resort, but could not meet Williams's price. Separately, the frequency of trolley service was reduced since the Flatbush Avenue tracks had been damaged by a storm that winter. In April of that month, Williams announced that the resort would not open unless the BRT repaired the trolley tracks to Bergen Beach. Later the trolley service improved, since Bergen Beach was a good source of fares. In the summer of 1903 the casino staged The Girl in Black, a popular musical-and-comedy show that ran for the whole season. The resort suffered $25,000 in damages (equivalent to $896,000 in 2025) due to a fire in 1904, but The New York Times reported that "the tide in Jamaica Bay and two Brooklyn Rapid Transit trolley cars" brought the water that ultimately saved the park from burning down. The Percy Williams Amusement Park opened the next year at the Bergen Beach resort. This became one of several amusement districts in the New York City area, competing with similar resorts in Canarsie; Coney Island; Rockaway Beach, Queens; and Staten Island.

A roller skating rink at the park opened in 1907, with a band playing in the afternoons. That year, surveyors were sent to map the settlements around Jamaica Bay as part of a project to dredge the bay for potential use. They reported that at the time, the only occupied settlements along Jamaica Bay were located at Canarsie and Bergen Beach. Piers for ferry service were constructed along Bergen Beach at Avenues V and X. Two ferry routes to Canarsie ran between 1905 and 1921, and for a short time, there was also a ferry to Rockaway Beach. However, ferry routes to Bergen Beach were not profitable, and it was hard to navigate the shallow channels near Bergen Island.

A more serious fire in 1910 crippled the Percy Williams Amusement Park's operations, destroying $400,000 worth of property (equivalent to $13,821,000 in 2025). By 1912, two more amusement parks had been built, as well as a scenic railroad. The resorts in Coney Island and Rockaway Beach proved to be more popular than Bergen Beach because the other resorts had easy transit access, whereas Bergen Beach did not. Pollution from Barren Island, a notorious waste processing site, also decreased the appeal of Bergen Beach. As a result, the Bergen Beach resort closed by 1919.

In 1917, as part of a dredging project in nearby Rockaway Inlet, the city agreed to add bulkheads along 4,000 feet (1,200 m) of the Bergen Beach coast. Williams and Adams later sued, ostensibly to delay the project.

=== Redevelopment ===
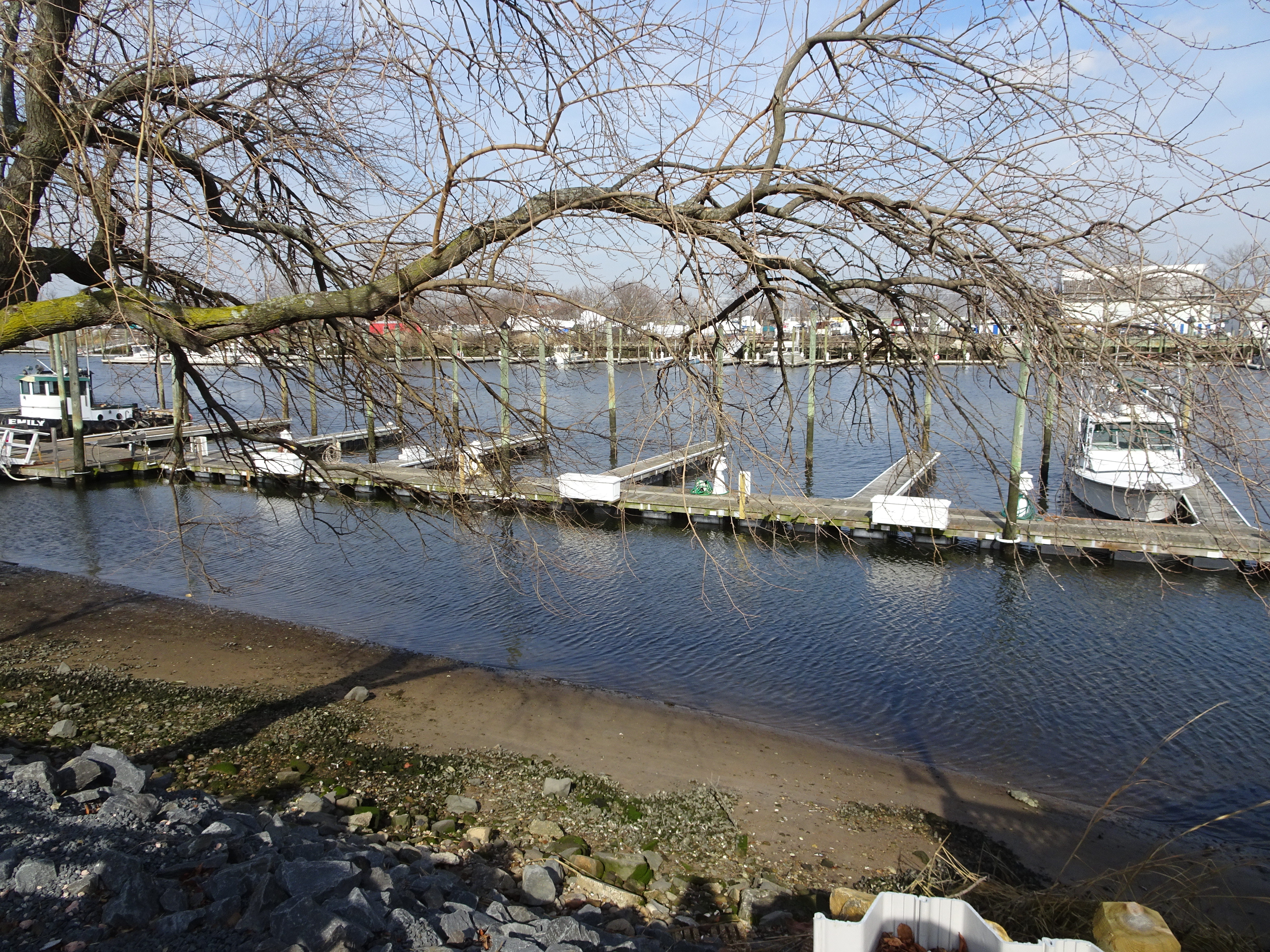
Marina in Bergen Beach

After the failure of the amusement park, Bergen Beach was redeveloped. In 1925, real estate developers Max Natanson and Mandlebaum & Levine bought Williams and Adams's former amusement park for close to $2 million (equivalent to $36,717,000 in 2025). At the time, they planned to develop Bergen Beach's 3,200 lots as a residential area with an entertainment district. There would have been a beach and an amusement park similar to Williams and Adams's park. However, this plan never materialized, and by 1926, the lots were sold off piece-by-piece to different people.

Bungalows and vacation houses were built on the coast of "Flatlands Bay", around Bergen Island, before World War I. However, city records from 1909 to 1915 do not indicate where exactly these houses were erected. In 1927, the New York City Department of Docks began leasing lots and bungalows on Bergen Beach. As of 1930, the yearly rates for these lots ranged between $10 and $240 (worth between $193 and $4,625 in 2025). Bergen's house itself was demolished during the construction of Belt Parkway, also known as the Shore Parkway, in the 1930s. When the parkway opened in 1936, though, it did not spur development in Bergen Beach. The 1939 WPA Guide to New York City mentions that the area comprising present-day Mill Basin and Bergen Beach was the residence of "pathetic communities of squatters, who live in makeshift houses, and eke out a living by fishing and scouring the near-by city dumps for odd necessities". At the time, the southern shore was still marshland. Although fourteen single-family houses were built in the 1940s, much of the neighborhood retained a rural character through the 1960s.

Starting in the 1950s, a series of suburban waterfront communities were being rapidly developed in Southeast Brooklyn, including in present-day Bergen Beach, Canarsie, and Mill Basin. By 1963, a new 69th Precinct building for the New York City Police Department, as well as the South Shore High School in Canarsie, had to be constructed to accommodate the growing population. The neighborhood had some of the most expensive houses in Brooklyn by 1972. Bergen Beach only became popular as a suburban neighborhood toward the end of the 20th century. Further development did not come until the 1980s, when more of the marsh was filled in. From 1983 to 1988, prices of residential lots in Bergen Beach increased fourfold. At the time, one developer was constructing two- and three-bedroom apartments with prices ranging between $115,000 and $243,500. The last city-owned sites along Paerdegat Basin were sold to private developers between 1980 and 1990.

In the 2010s, a combined sewer overflow (CSO) facility for Paerdegat Basin was built in Bergen Beach. It was completed in August 2011.

=== Georgetowne ===
A part of the neighborhood called Georgetowne, located to the north of Bergen Beach proper, was undeveloped until the 1960s, when a community of 400 two-story semi-attached colonials called Georgetowne Greens was proposed. Many of the homes would have been built on the landfilled section of the area. Around the same time, Mayor John Lindsay sought to build a 904-unit middle-class housing development called Harbour Village in the same area. Harbour Village would be a Mitchell-Lama development built using modular construction. The uncertainty of whether it would be approved brought new construction on Georgetowne Greens to a halt.

The New York City Board of Estimate approved Harbour Village by an 18–0 vote on March 25, 1971. However, it ultimately rejected the proposal in September 1972 after public outcry by the mostly white, mostly well-off residents of nearby Bergen Beach and Mill Basin. By that point, interest in Georgetowne Greens had waned, and the project was terminated. The first houses built for the development still remain. The area was ultimately developed as the neighborhood of Georgetown, though parts of Georgetown remained undeveloped through the 2000s. The "Georgetowne" appellation still exists in the name of a strip mall in Georgetown.

== Community ==
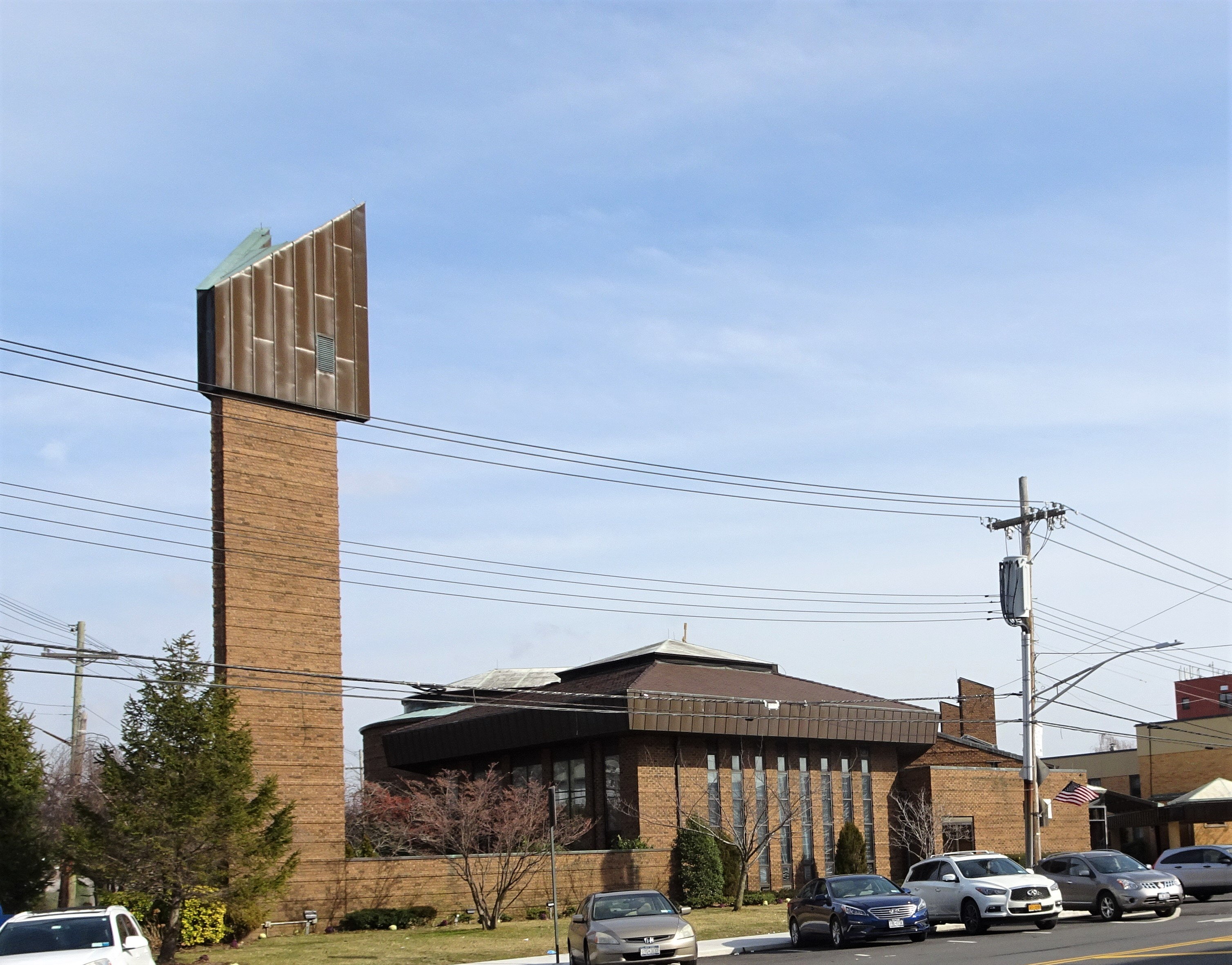
St. Bernard Clairvaux Church

Located along the southern coast of Brooklyn, Bergen Beach has a suburban quality. The nearest stores are located in the Georgetown Shopping Center, as well as a Key Food location in Mill Basin. Bergen Beach also contains the Mill Harbor Condominiums, one of the few gated communities in New York City. The neighborhood includes the St. Bernard Clairvaux Church, located on Veterans Avenue near 69th Street. Bergen Beach and Georgetown are part of Brooklyn Community Board 18, which also includes Canarsie, Mill Basin, Marine Park, and the southern portion of Flatlands.

Bergen Beach and Georgetown are located in ZIP Code 11234, which also includes Mill Basin, Marine Park, and the southern portion of Flatlands. Based on data from the 2010 United States census, the combined population of Georgetown, Marine Park, Bergen Beach, and Mill Basin was 45,231, an increase of 2,291 (5.3%) from the 42,940 counted in the 2000 United States census. Covering an area of 1,662.88 acres (672.94 ha), the neighborhood had a population density of 27.2 inhabitants per acre (17,400/sq mi; 6,700/km^{2}).

By the end of the 20th century, the vast majority of Bergen Beach residents were white, as were most residents of adjacent neighborhoods such as Mill Basin and Marine Park. Specifically, many of the residents were Italian-Americans. The 1990 United States census counted 3,873 residents, of which three were black; as of the 2000 United States census, there were 28 black residents. However, by 2011, the number of black residents in Southeast Brooklyn had risen 241%, the steepest such increase of any area in the city. As of that year, the African American population in these neighborhoods represented 10.9% of the total population. As of the 2010 Census, the racial makeup of Southeast Brooklyn was 73.8% (33,399) White, 10.9% (4,952) African American, 0.1% (47) Native American, 5.6% (2,521) Asian, 0.0% (7) Pacific Islander, 0.3% (144) from other races, and 1.3% (578) from two or more races. Hispanic or Latino of any race were 7.9% (3,583) of the population.

== Police and crime ==
Bergen Beach is patrolled by the New York City Police Department's 63rd Precinct. The precinct also covers Marine Park, Mill Basin, and part of Flatlands. Because of the precinct's distance from Bergen Beach, some residents had complained that there was not enough police presence in the neighborhood. The 63rd Precinct ranked 31st safest out of 69 patrol areas for per-capita crime in 2010.

The 63rd Precinct has a lower crime rate than in the 1990s, with crimes across all categories having decreased by 82.7% between 1990 and 2022. The precinct reported 1 murder, 10 rapes, 114 robberies, 170 felony assaults, 119 burglaries, 537 grand larcenies, and 135 grand larcenies auto in 2022.

== Recreation ==
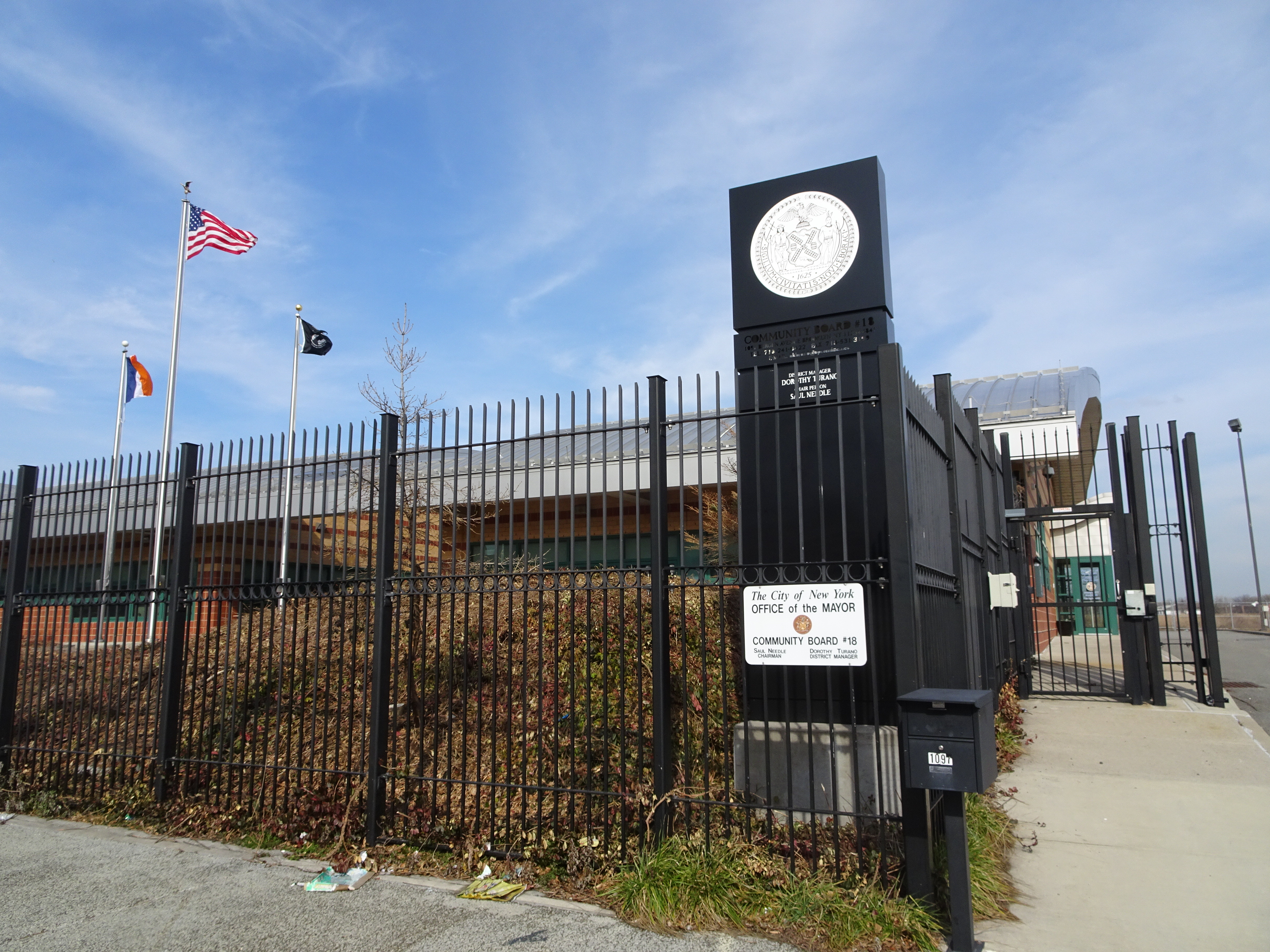
Entrance to Brooklyn Community Board 18 headquarters

The New York City Department of Parks and Recreation operates several parks in the Bergen Beach area. Joseph T. McGuire Park is located on Bergen Avenue, along the eastern coast of Bergen Beach between Avenue V and Shore Parkway. It contains several fields for sports such as baseball and volleyball. Bergen Beach Playground is located in Bergen Beach's northwestern section along East 71st Street between Avenues N and T. Hickman Playground, located on Veterans Avenue between East 66th and 68th Streets, is named for Flatlands resident Vincent Hickman, who died during the Korean War.

Since 1971, the Jamaica Bay Riding Academy has operated a horseback riding school along Shore Parkway with 80 stables. The academy spans 500 acres (200 ha) within the Gateway National Recreation Area, which borders Bergen Beach to the south.

== Education ==
P.S. 312, a public elementary school, is located in Bergen Beach. Success Academy Charter Schools also operates an elementary school in Bergen Beach.

Brooklyn Public Library operates the Mill Basin Library at 2385 Ralph Avenue, near Avenue N. The Mill Basin Library first opened in 1940, and it has been located in its current building since 1975.

== Notable streets ==
Private Cosmo L. Barone Triangle is bounded by Avenue U, East 71st Street, and Veterans Avenue. It is named after Pfc. Cosmo Barone, a soldier who grew up in Brooklyn and died during the Vietnam War. Veterans Avenue, in turn, was renamed to honor soldiers who fought in World War II. It had been named Island Avenue because it originally led to Bergen Island.

Mill Lane exists in several small, disconnected segments south of Avenue N. One segment is located in the extreme western section of present-day Bergen Beach. It formerly connected with a Native American trail named Bergen Beach Road, which led from the town of Flatlands to Bergen Island.

Ralph Avenue, the western boundary of Bergen Beach, was named after Ralph Patchen, an early landowner in Brooklyn who owned land further north along the avenue.

== Transportation ==
There is very little public transportation in Bergen Beach. There are no New York City Subway stations in the area, and many residents drive their own vehicles. A survey in 2014 found that Bergen Beach and Georgetown were among the neighborhoods in Brooklyn that were the furthest from the subway.

The only public transportation is the B3, B41, and BM1 bus routes, operated by MTA Regional Bus Operations. The B3 route formerly ran further into Bergen Beach, serving East 73rd and East 74th Streets, but was truncated to Avenue U and East 71st Street in 2010. The B41 route actually has two branches: one to Bergen Beach and one to the Kings Plaza shopping mall. It was a descendant of the Flatbush Avenue streetcar route, which was replaced by the current bus service in March 1951.
