= Flatlands, Brooklyn =

Neighborhood in New York City

Flatlands
- Neighborhood of Brooklyn
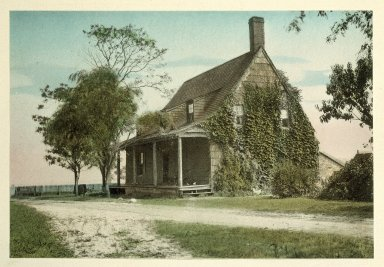
- Jans Martense Schenck house, Flatlands, built 1675, formerly at Avenue U and East 63rd Street
- Interactive map of Flatlands
- Coordinates: 40.621°N 73.935°W
- Country: United States
- State: New York
- City: New York City
- Borough: Brooklyn
- Community District: Brooklyn 18

Area
  - Total: 2.2800 sq mi (5.9053 km^{2})

Population (2010)
  - Total: 64,762
  - Density: 28,404/sq mi (10,967/km^{2})

Ethnicity
  - Black: 66.3%
  - White: 18.2
  - Hispanic: 8.9
  - Asian: 4.0
  - Other: 2.6
- Time zone: UTC−5 (Eastern)
  - Summer (DST): UTC−4 (EDT)
- ZIP Code: 11234
- Area codes: 718, 347, 929, and 917

Flatlands is a neighborhood in the southeast part of the borough of Brooklyn in New York City. The current neighborhood borders are roughly defined by the Bay Ridge Branch to the north, Avenue U to the south, Ralph Avenue to the east, and Flatbush Avenue to the southwest.

Originally an independent town, Flatlands became part of the City of Brooklyn in 1896.

Flatlands is part of Brooklyn Community District 18, and its primary ZIP Code is 11234. It is patrolled by the 63rd Precinct of the New York City Police Department. Politically it is represented by the New York City Council's 45th and 46th Districts.

== History ==
Flatlands was originally known as Nieuw Amersfoort, after the Dutch city of Amersfoort, and was established as a farming community in 1636 when Wolfert Gerritse Van Couwenhoven and Andries Hudde purchased 15,000 acres of land centered on what is now the intersection of Kings Highway and Flatbush Avenue.

The land was ostensibly purchased from the Native Lenape people, who had lived near the fishing rich waters of Jamaica Bay for a thousand years. However, it is unlikely that the Lenape leaders, who did not practice the concept of land ownership, understood the agreement to which they were being conjoined. Rather, leaders such as Sachem Penhawitz more probably believed they were negotiating a treaty regarding the usage of the land. Wealthy Dutch land owners disagreed and within two generations, the once-powerful Canarsee tribe of the Lenape was brought to near extinction by bloody conflict with Europeans and other tribes, as well as the ravages of disease.

Flatlands was given the right to local rule in 1661 by Peter Stuyvesant as one of the five Dutch Towns on Long Island in New Netherland.

The town's growth and development came late, largely due to the lack of a transit system or set of roads connecting it with other parts of Brooklyn. Flatlands was annexed by the city of Brooklyn in 1896. At the time, it contained numerous small islands on Jamaica Bay, including Mill Island, Bergen Island, and Barren Island.

=== Land use ===
Crops typically grown in the area were beans, corn, marsh hay, squash, potato bean and tobacco. Oysters and clams were also farmed and harvested from Jamaica Bay, surrounding marshes and basins. The land-controlling families of Nieuw Amersfoort also kept black slaves to work their farms until the state declared emancipation of all slaves in 1827, after which black laborers took up farming jobs, many times on the farms they worked on as slaves.

=== Historic buildings ===
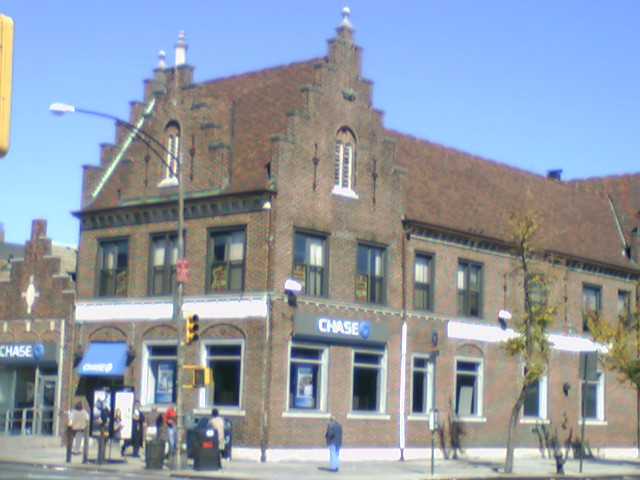
Colonial architectural details in Flatlands

Historic homes dated to the 18th century include the Stoothoff-Baxter-Kouwenhaven House and Joost Van Nuyse House.

Other historic structures are the Hendrick I. Lott House (East 36th Street between Fillmore Ave and Ave. S, built around 1720), which was a stop on the Underground Railroad, and the Flatlands Dutch Reformed Church, founded by Pieter Clausen Wycoff.

== Demographics ==
Based on data from the 2010 United States census, the population of Flatlands was 64,762, a decrease of 1,964 (2.9%) from the 66,726 counted in 2000. Covering an area of 1,249.32 acres (505.58 ha), the neighborhood had a population density of 51.8 inhabitants per acre (33,200/sq mi; 12,800/km^{2}).

The racial makeup of the neighborhood was 18.2% (11,793) White, 66.3% (42,935) African American, 0.2% (158) Native American, 4.0% (2,577) Asian, 0.0% (16) Pacific Islander, 0.5% (334) from other races, and 1.8% (1,196) from two or more races. Hispanic or Latino of any race were 8.9% (5,753) of the population.

The entirety of Community District 18, which comprises Canarsie and Flatlands, had 165,543 inhabitants as of NYC Health's 2018 Community Health Profile, with an average life expectancy of 82.0 years. This is slightly higher than the median life expectancy of 81.2 for all New York City neighborhoods. Most inhabitants are middle-aged adults and youth: 25% are between the ages of 0 and 17, 29% between 25 and 44, and 24% between 45 and 64. The ratio of college-aged and elderly residents was lower, at 9% and 13% respectively.

As of 2016, the median household income in Community District 18 was $76,647. In 2018, an estimated 15% of Community District 18 residents lived in poverty, compared to 21% in all of Brooklyn and 20% in all of New York City. One in eleven residents (9%) were unemployed, compared to 9% in the rest of both Brooklyn and New York City. Rent burden, or the percentage of residents who have difficulty paying their rent, is 50% in Community District 18, lower than the citywide and boroughwide rates of 52% and 51% respectively. Based on this calculation, as of 2018, Community District 18 is considered to be high-income relative to the rest of the city and not gentrifying.

The 2020 census data from New York City Department of City Planning showed that there were 40,000+ Black residents, the White and Hispanic populations were each between 5,000 and 9,999 residents, and the Asian residents were less than 5000.

== Shopping district ==
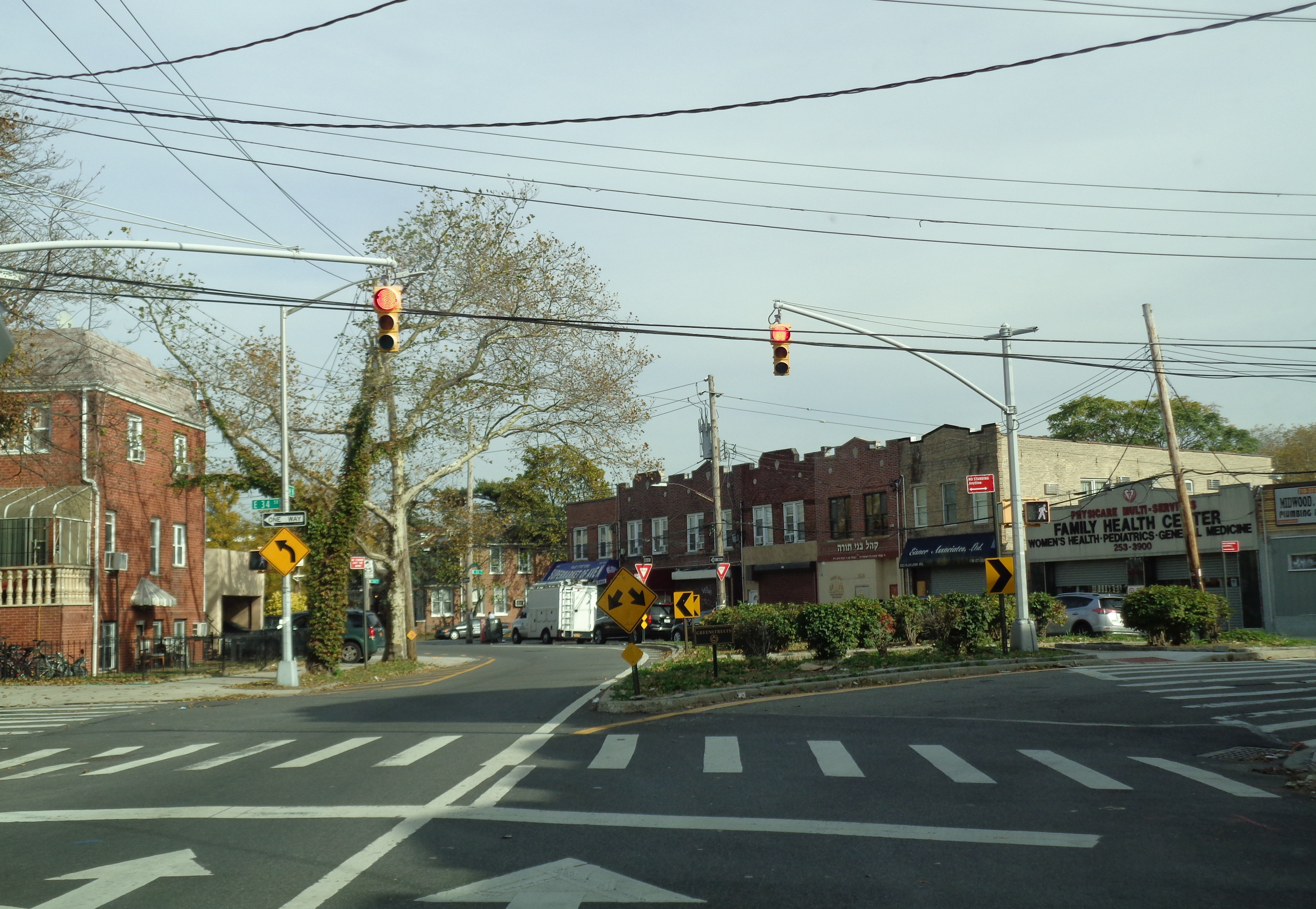
End of Avenue N at Flatlands Avenue

The main shopping streets in Flatlands are Utica Avenue, Flatbush Avenue, Avenue N, and Ralph Avenue. Residents also commonly shop at the nearby indoor mall, Kings Plaza, located at the border of Flatlands, Marine Park and Mill Basin. The mall is located in Mill Basin, just south of the subsection within the neighborhood called, Old Mill Basin.

== Police and crime ==
Flatlands is patrolled by the New York City Police Department's 63rd Precinct. The precinct also covers Marine Park, Mill Basin, and Bergen Beach. The 63rd Precinct ranked 31st safest out of 69 patrol areas for per-capita crime in 2010. As of 2018, with a non-fatal assault rate of 46 per 100,000 people, Community District 18's rate of violent crimes per capita is less than that of the city as a whole. The incarceration rate of 380 per 100,000 people is lower than that of the city as a whole.

The 63rd Precinct has a lower crime rate than in the 1990s, with crimes across all categories having decreased by 82.7% between 1990 and 2022. The precinct reported 1 murder, 10 rapes, 114 robberies, 170 felony assaults, 119 burglaries, 537 grand larcenies, and 135 grand larcenies auto in 2022.

== Fire safety ==
The New York City Fire Department (FDNY)'s Engine Co. 309/Ladder Co. 159 is located at 1851 East 48th Street.

== Health ==
Preterm births are more common in Community District 18 than in other places citywide, though births to teenage mothers are less common. In Community District 18, there were 89 preterm births per 1,000 live births (compared to 87 per 1,000 citywide), and 11.6 births to teenage mothers per 1,000 live births (compared to 19.3 per 1,000 citywide). Community District 18 has a relatively low population of residents who are uninsured, or who receive healthcare through Medicaid. In 2018, this population of uninsured residents was estimated to be 21%, which is higher than the citywide rate of 12%.

The concentration of fine particulate matter, the deadliest type of air pollutant, in Community District 18 is 0.0071 milligrams per cubic metre (7.1×10^{−9} oz/ft^{3}), lower than the citywide and boroughwide averages. Fifteen percent of Community District 18 residents are smokers, which is slightly higher than the city average of 14% of residents being smokers. In Community District 18, 30% of residents are obese, 14% are diabetic, and 37% have high blood pressure—compared to the citywide averages of 24%, 11%, and 28% respectively. In addition, 21% of children are obese, compared to the citywide average of 20%.

Eighty-one percent of residents eat some fruits and vegetables every day, which is lower than the city's average of 87%. In 2018, 77% of residents described their health as "good", "very good", or "excellent", slightly less than the city's average of 78%. For every supermarket in Community District 18, there are 9 bodegas.

== Post offices and ZIP Code ==
Flatlands is covered by ZIP Code 11234. The United States Post Office's Canarsie Station is located at 10201 Flatlands Avenue, while the Ryder Station is located at 2222 Flatbush Avenue.

== Education ==
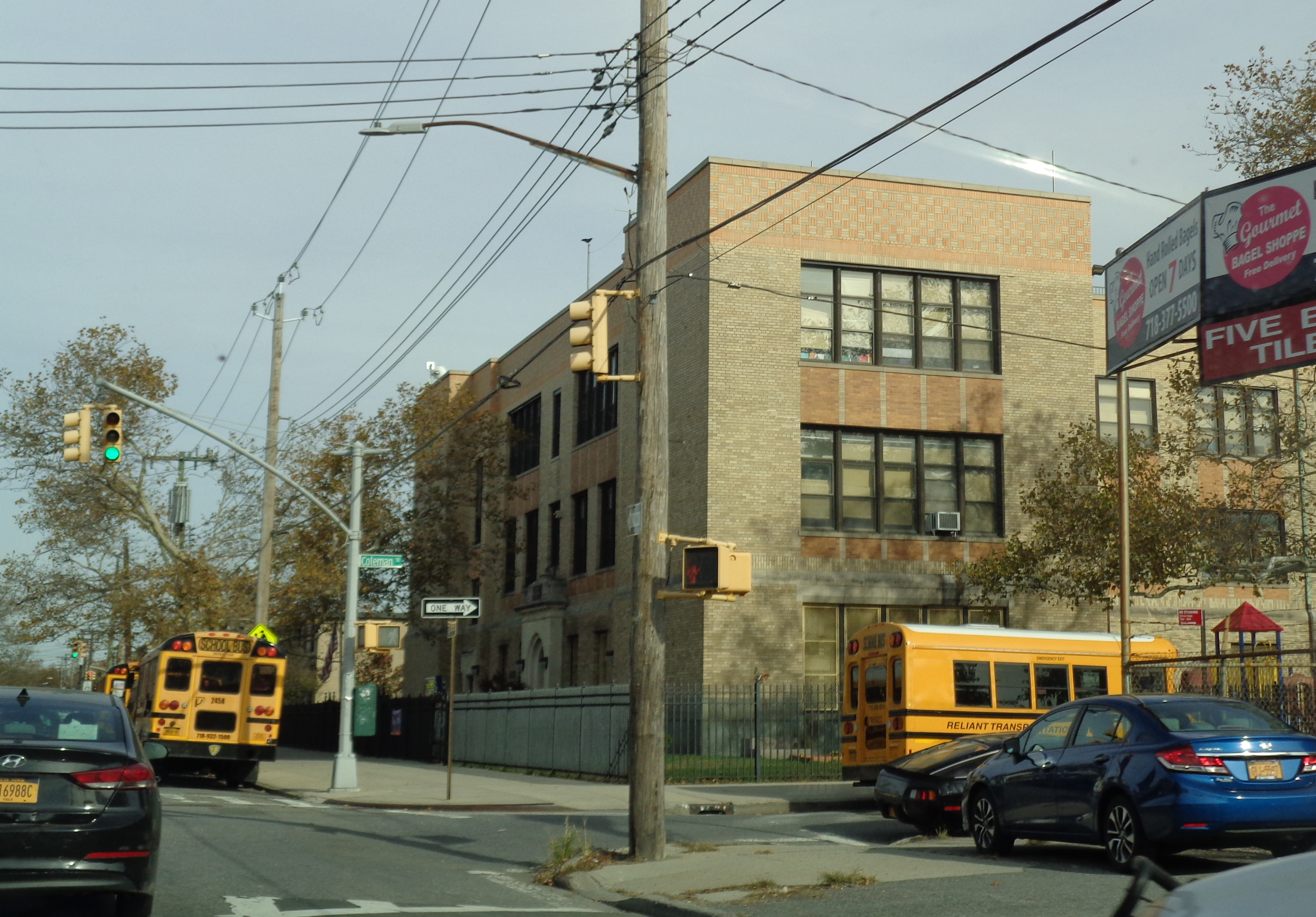
PS 207 Annex

Community District 22 generally has a similar ratio of college-educated residents to the rest of the city as of 2018. Though 40% of residents age 25 and older have a college education or higher, 13% have less than a high school education and 48% are high school graduates or have some college education. By contrast, 40% of Brooklynites and 38% of city residents have a college education or higher.

Community District 22's rate of elementary school student absenteeism is slightly lower than the rest of New York City.

=== Schools ===
Flatlands contains the following public elementary schools that serve grades PK-5 unless otherwise indicated:

- PS 119 Amersfort
- PS 203 Floyd Bennett
- PS 251 Paerdegat
- PS 326 (grades PK-2)

The following schools are located nearby:

- PS 207 Elizabeth G Leary (grades PK-8), in Marine Park
- PS 222 Katherine R Snyder (grades PK-5), in Marine Park
- PS 236 Mill Basin (grades PK-5), in Mill Basin
- PS 312 Bergen Beach (grades PK-5), in Bergen Beach
- JHS 78 Roy H Mann (grades 6–8), in Bergen Beach
- South Shore High School Education Complex
- S.J. Tilden High School Education Campus
- Brooklyn Theatre Arts High School (grades 9–12), in Canarsie

=== Libraries ===
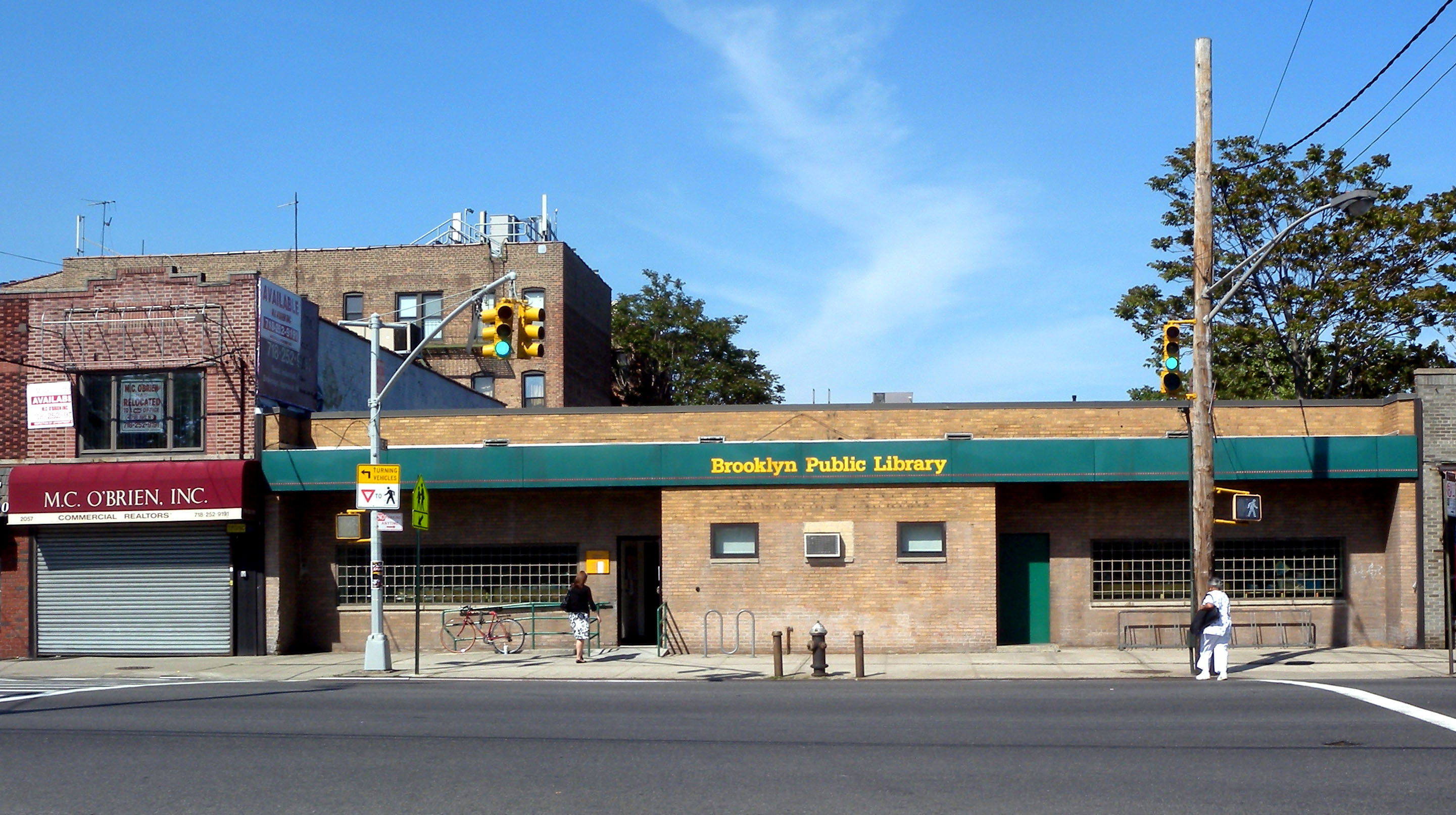
Brooklyn Public Library, Flatlands branch

The Brooklyn Public Library (BPL) has two branches in Flatlands. The Flatlands branch is located at 2065 Flatbush Avenue near Avenue P. It was opened in a former Prudential Savings Bank branch in 1949, and moved to its current 6,000-square-foot (560 m^{2}) space in 1955.

The Paerdegat branch is located at 850 East 59th Street near Paerdegat Avenue South. It opened in 1950 and moved to its current building in 1959.

== Transportation ==
No New York City Subway service runs into Flatlands. Many residents live within walking distance of the IRT Nostrand Avenue Line (2 and 5 trains), however, which terminates at the junction of Flatbush and Nostrand Avenues; others use buses to get to the BMT Brighton Line (B and Q trains) or the BMT Canarsie Line (L train). Local and express buses are also used as a means of travel in and around the area. As of August 2019, the buses that serve Flatlands are the B2, B6, B7, B9, B41, B44, B44 SBS, B46, B46 SBS, B47, B82, B82 SBS, B100, B103, BM1, BM2 and Q35.

== Notable residents ==
- Neil Bogart (1943–1982), founder of Casablanca Records, was raised in the Glenwood Houses project in Flatlands
- Roy DeMeo (1942–1983), Gambino crime family member
- Leonard DiMaria (born 1941), mobster and Caporegime in the Gambino crime family
- Abner Louima (born 1966), Haitian immigrant and father, brutally assaulted by NYPD
- Chris Mullin (born 1963), former NBA basketball player, was born and raised in Flatlands.
- Steven Van Voorhees (1600–1684), magistrate, first Voorhees in America
- Wolfert Gerritse Van Couwenhoven (1579–1662), New Netherland colonist and the original patentee.
