= Paerdegat Basin =

Coordinates: 40°37′38″N 73°54′28″W

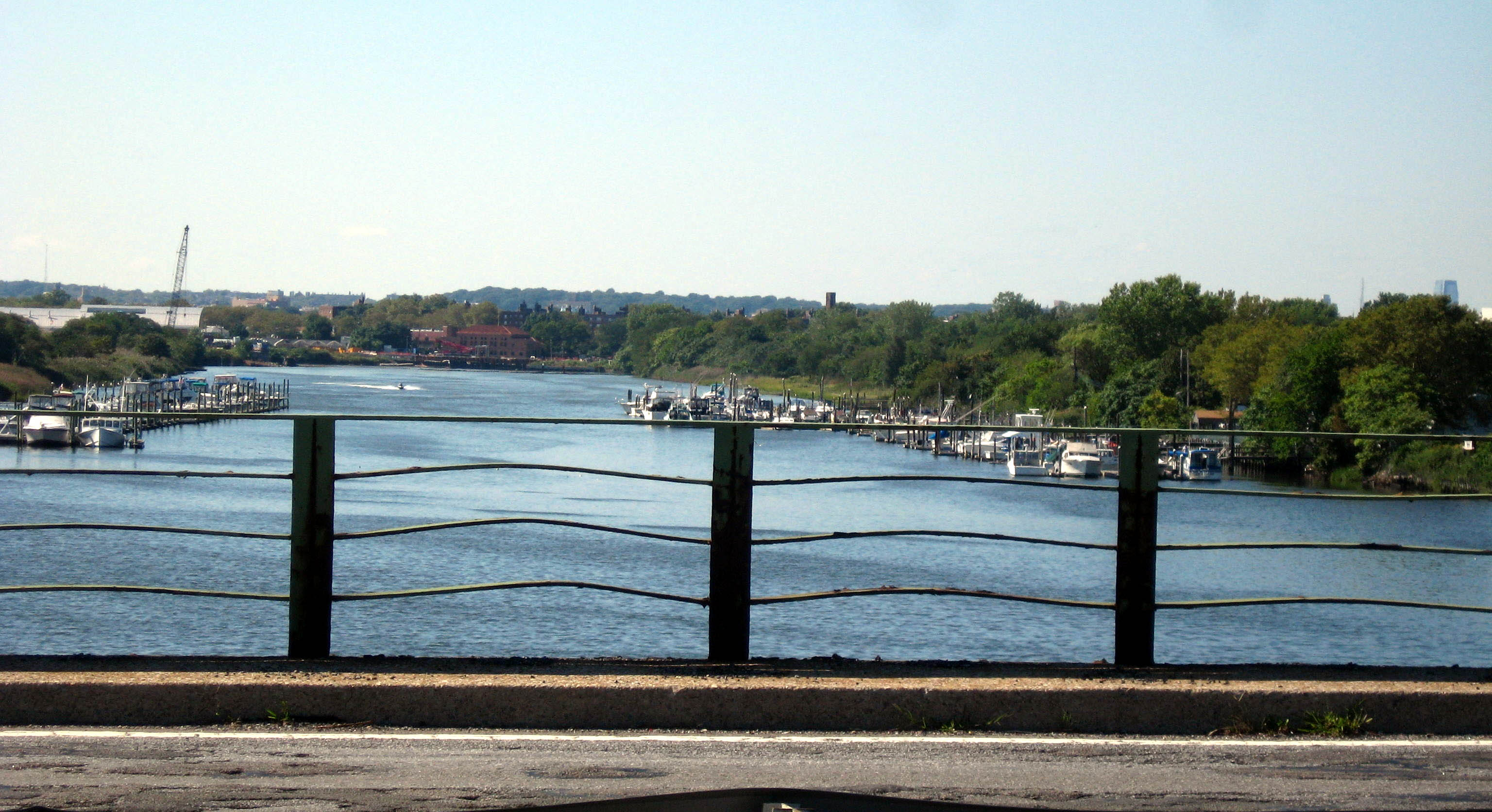
From Shore Parkway

Paerdegat Basin is a channel that connects to Jamaica Bay between the neighborhoods of Bergen Beach and Canarsie in southeast Brooklyn, New York, United States. It connects to Jamaica Bay to the south, and the north end of the basin is adjacent to the intersection of Ralph Avenue and Flatlands Avenue. "Paerdegat" derives from the old Dutch paardengat, meaning "horse gate".

== Formation ==
Paerdegat Basin came to its present form in the late 1920s. Before then, it was a freshwater-fed tidal creek known at various times as Bestevaar Kill, Bedford Creek, and Paerdegat Creek. It was much longer than the present-day basin, and had several branches. The basin adjoined Brooklyn's last patch of natural forest, which was demolished in 1940.

== Jamaica Bay seaport plan ==
The waterway was an important part of a failed plan to transform Jamaica Bay into an alternative port to New York Harbor. Such a plan had been entertained in the 1910s, but was ultimately unsuccessful.

In 1927, the docklands project was revived when a connection to the Long Island Rail Road was announced. Planners wanted to create a spur of the Bay Ridge Branch south to Flatlands, with two branches to Canarsie and Mill Basin. A connection to Staten Island would be built via the planned Staten Island Tunnel, which would in turn allow freight to be delivered and shipped to the rest of the continental United States. The Port Authority of New York and New Jersey offered to build the new railroad link for $2 million and lease it to the city.

In January 1931, the New York City Board of Estimate approved a plan to build railroads on both sides of Paerdegat Basin, connecting the LIRR to Canarsie Pier to the east and to Floyd Bennett Field to the west. However, the plans for rail service to the rest of Brooklyn went unrealized.

The only project that was completed was the dredging of Paerdegat Basin to a 16-foot (4.9 m) depth. In the 1950s and 1960s, much of the city-owned land around the basin was sold off to private developers. The neighborhoods of Georgetown and Bergen Beach were built near its banks.

== Sewage treatment plant ==
The waterway is polluted due to the overflow location of the combined sewer system at the basin's northern end. The area's sanitary sewer (from residential and industrial sources) is carried through the same system as the storm water. Typically, the full volume of that water is drained to the Coney Island Wastewater Treatment Plant (WWTP) located on Knapp Street.

However, during periods of heavy rainfall, the Knapp Street plant does not have the capacity to treat the full volume of the water, so untreated water is forced to flow out into Paerdegat Basin. The New York City Department of Environmental Protection is working to mitigate the environmental impact of the overflow on the ecosystem. At the same time, the DEP is working with the Parks Department to repair the saltwater wetland area which lines the east and west shores of the basin. NYC Parks and NYCDEP are building a Combined Sewer Overflow (CSO) facility at that location; the construction contract was awarded to the joint venture of Slattery Skanska / Gottlieb Skanska, which is a subsidiary of the global construction company Skanska. The facility serves as holding tank for the excess water, and whenever the Knapp Street plant can accept additional water, the water is pumped from the holding tank of the CSO facility back to the plant to be treated, preventing the raw untreated sewage from flowing into the Basin. The CSO facility was completed in August 2011.
