= Conover (surname) =

Conover is a surname of Irish and Dutch origin. Notable people with the surname include:

- Adam Conover (born 1982), American comedian
- Charlotte Reeve Conover (1855–1940), American author, lecturer, political activist and educator
- Daniel Conover (1822–1896), American public servant, political activist and industrialist
- David Conover (1919–1983), American author and photojournalist
- David G. Conover, American documentary film and television director
- David O. Conover (born 1953), American marine biologist
- Harry Conover (1911–1965), American radio performer, model and business executive
- Henry Boardman Conover (1892–1950), American ornithologist
- Larry Conover (1894–1945), American football player
- Lloyd Conover (1923–2017), American inventor of tetracycline
- Mark Conover (1960–2022), American long-distance runner and coach.
- Richard Field Conover (1858–1930), American tennis player, lawyer and real estate manager
- Scott Conover (born 1968), American football player
- Simon B. Conover (1840–1908), American politician from Florida
- Ted Conover (born 1958), American writer
- Teresa Maxwell-Conover (1884–1968), American actress
- William Sheldrick Conover II (1928–2022), American politician
- Willis Conover (1920–1996), American jazz producer and broadcaster
