= Brooklyn =

Borough and county in New York, US

Brooklyn Kings County, New York
- Borough and county
- Borough of Brooklyn
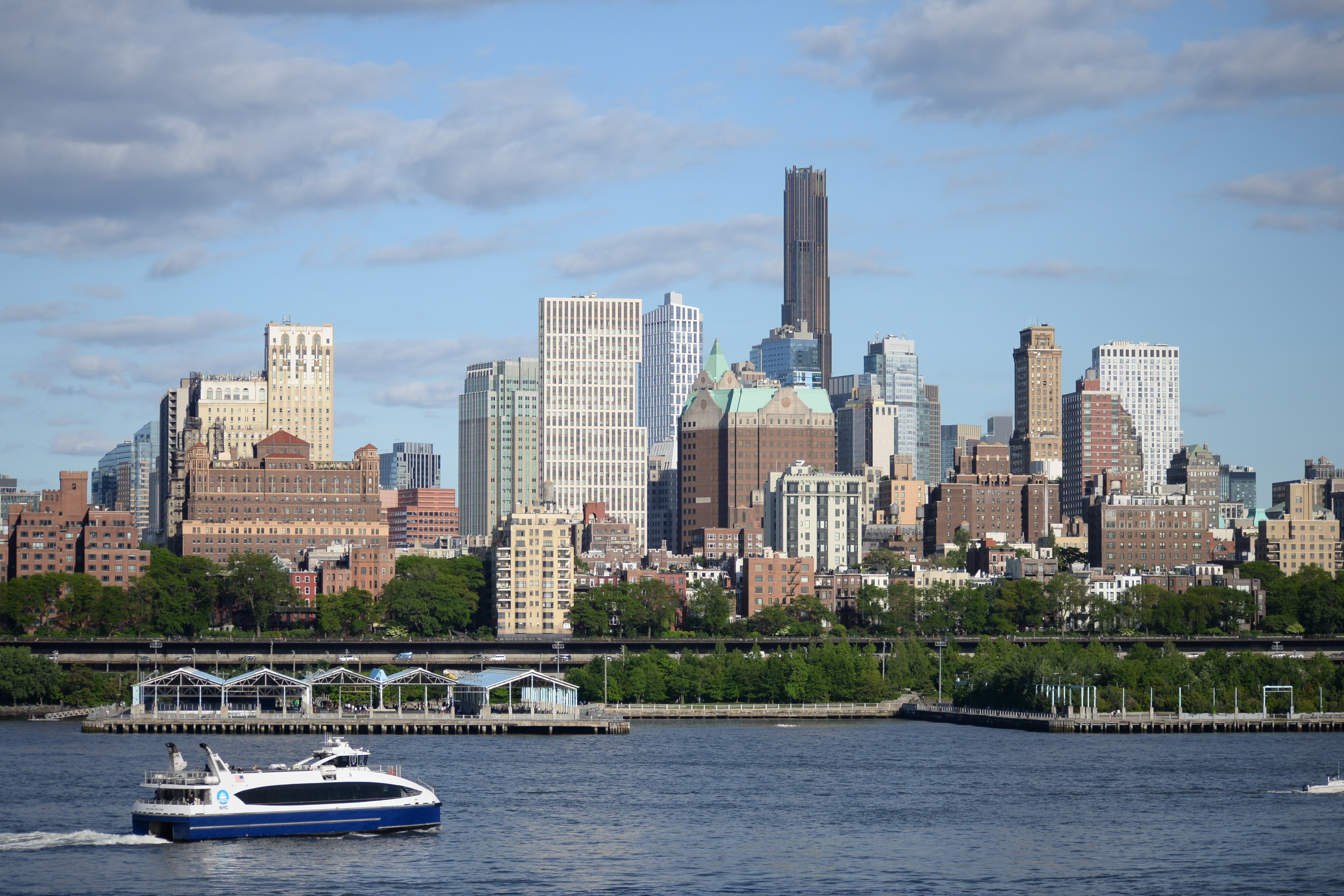
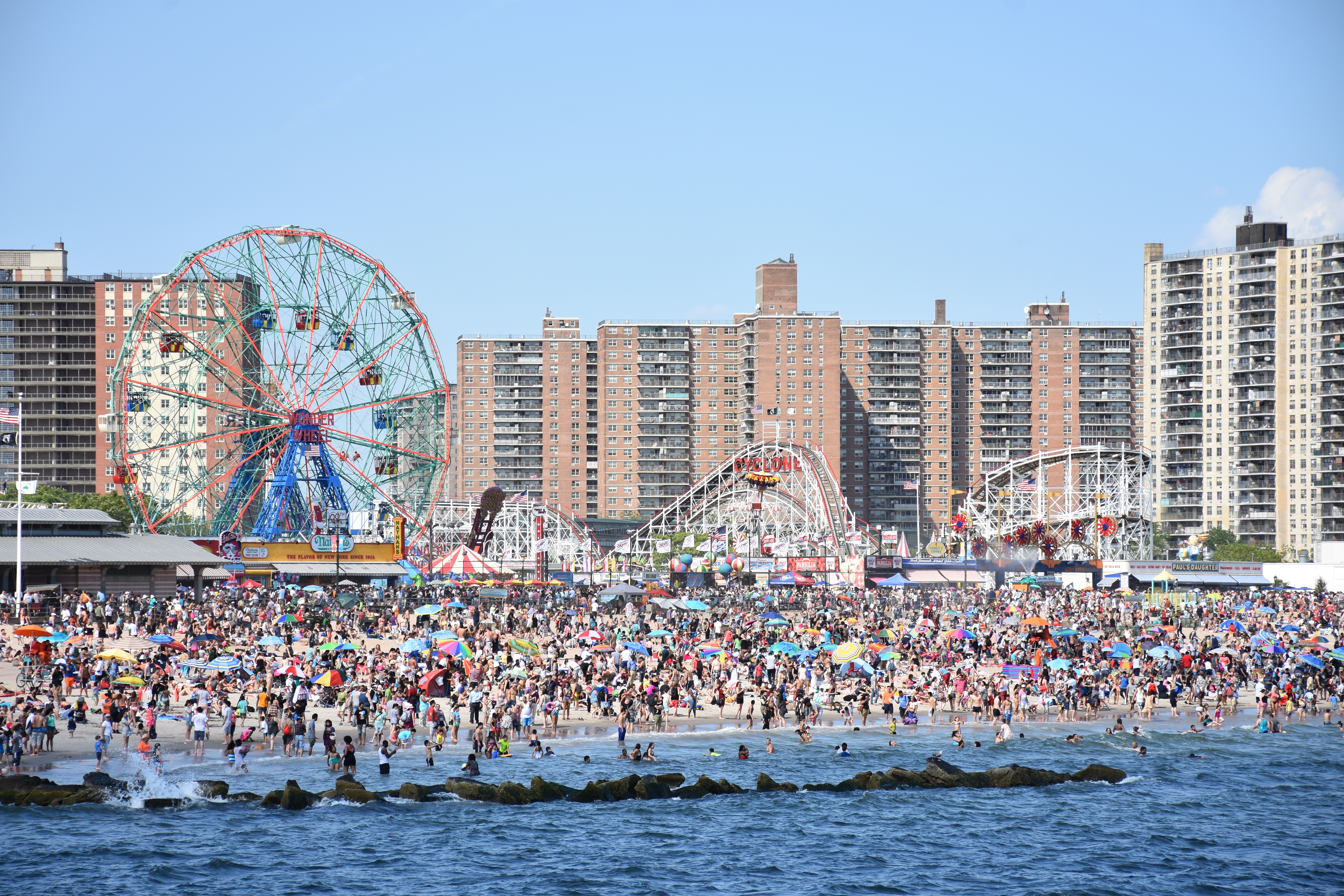
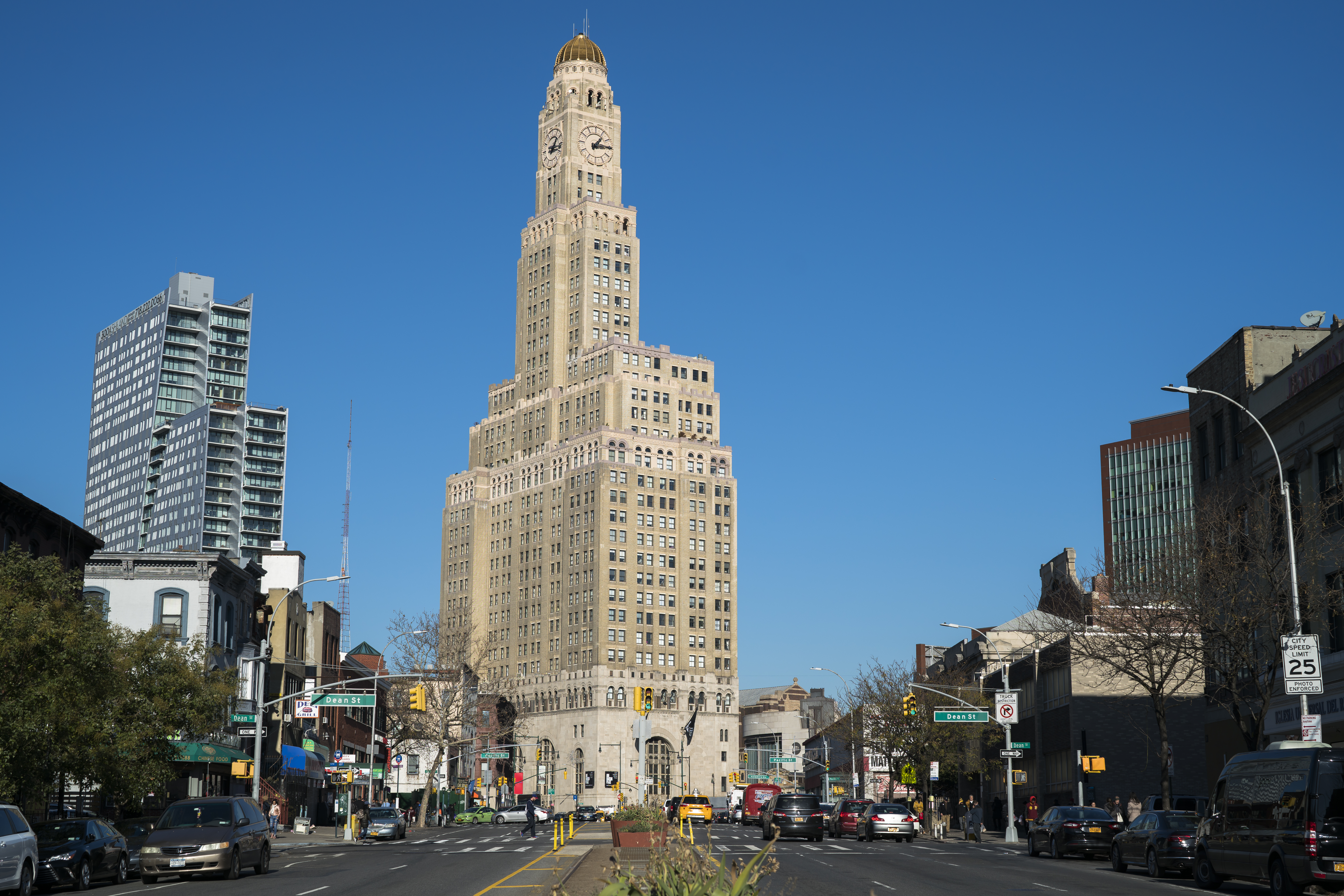
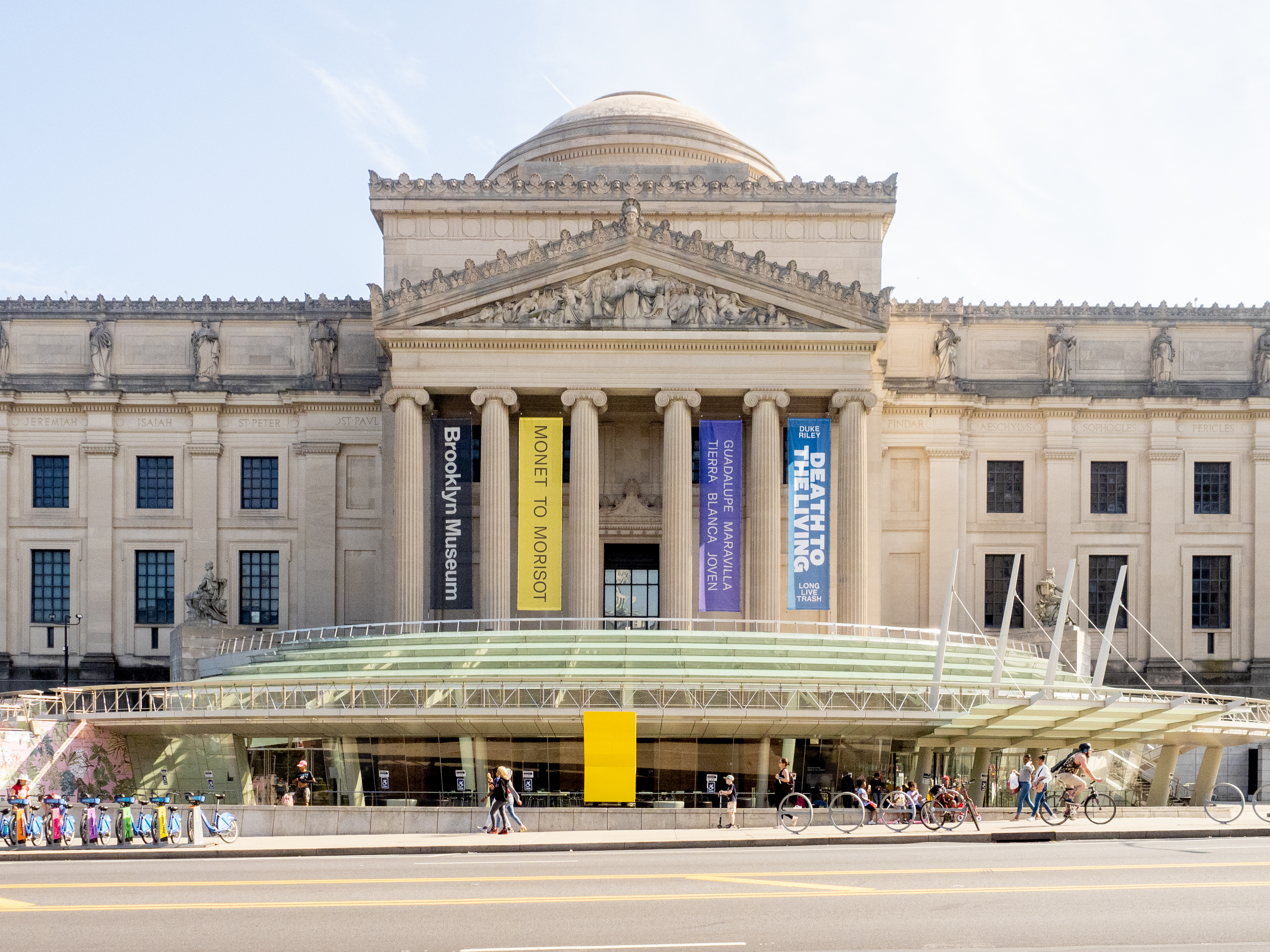
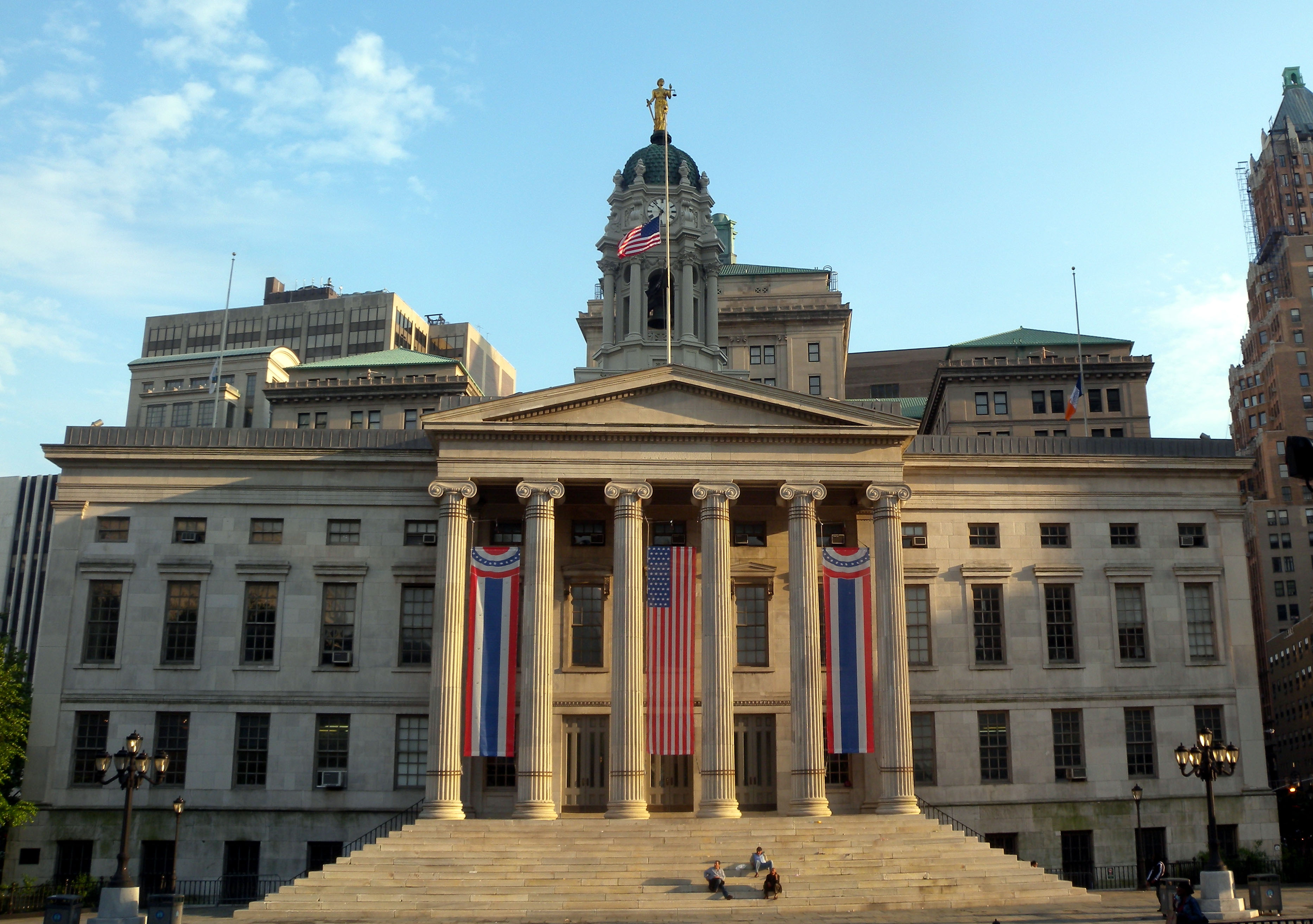
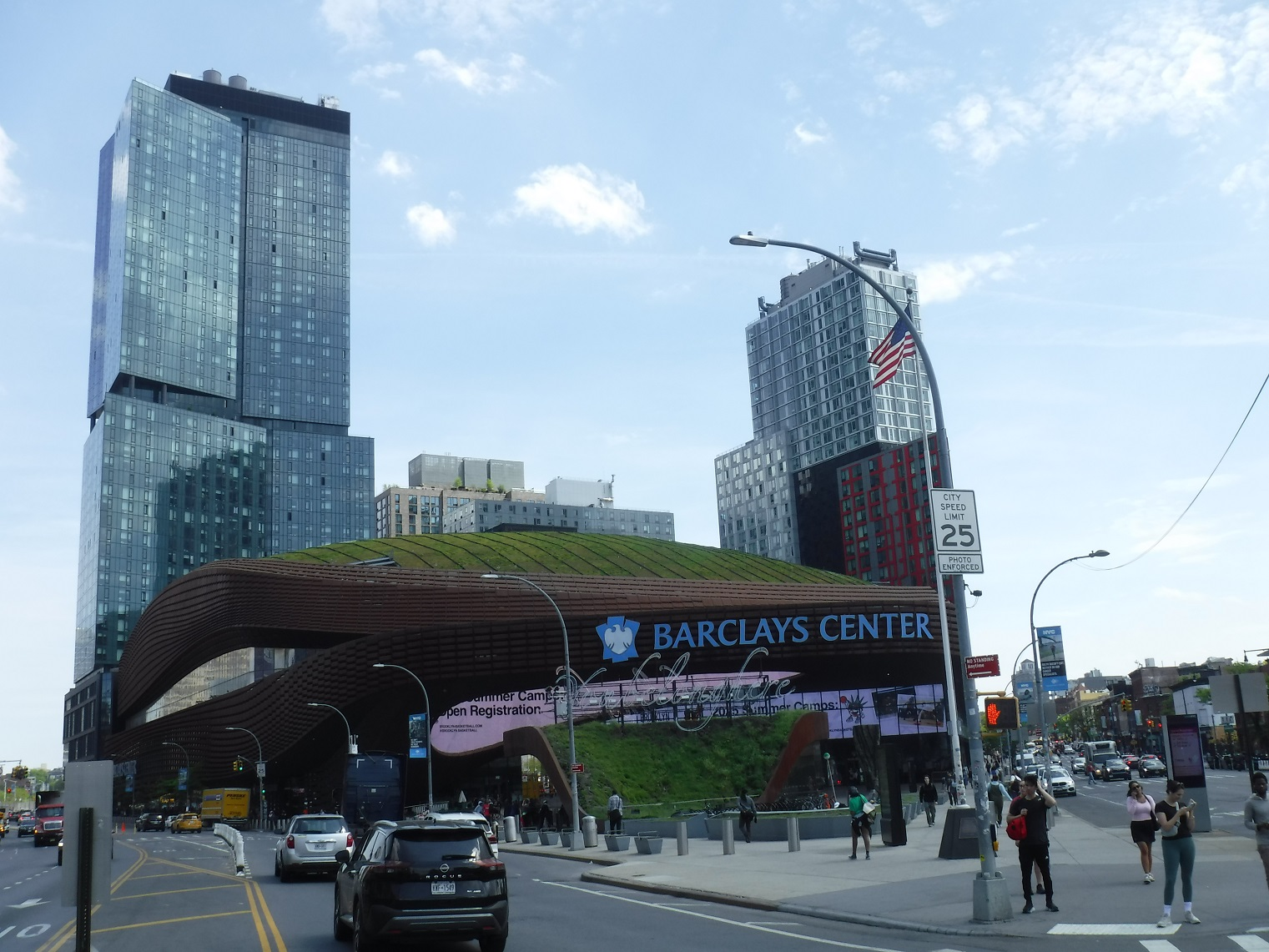
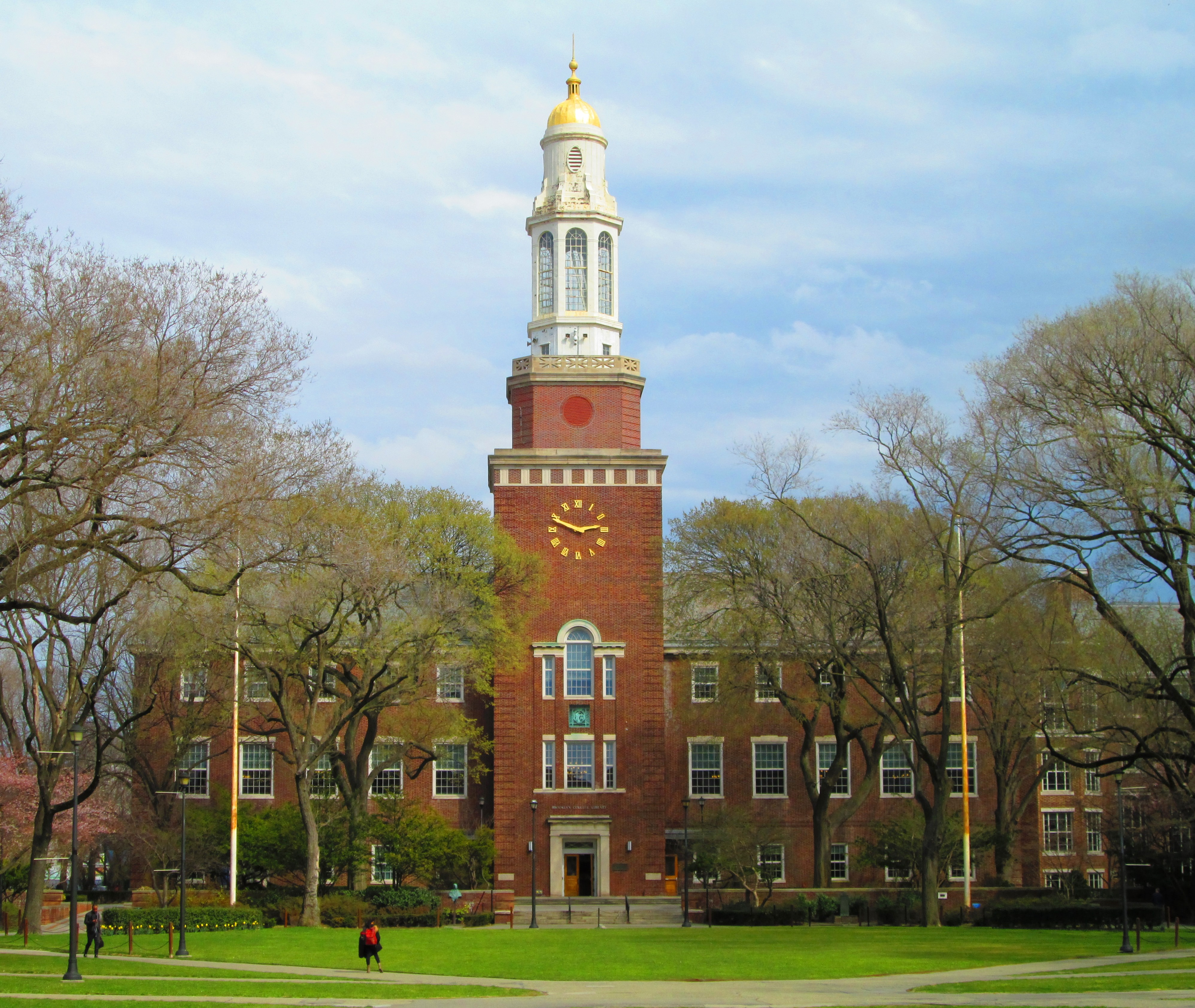
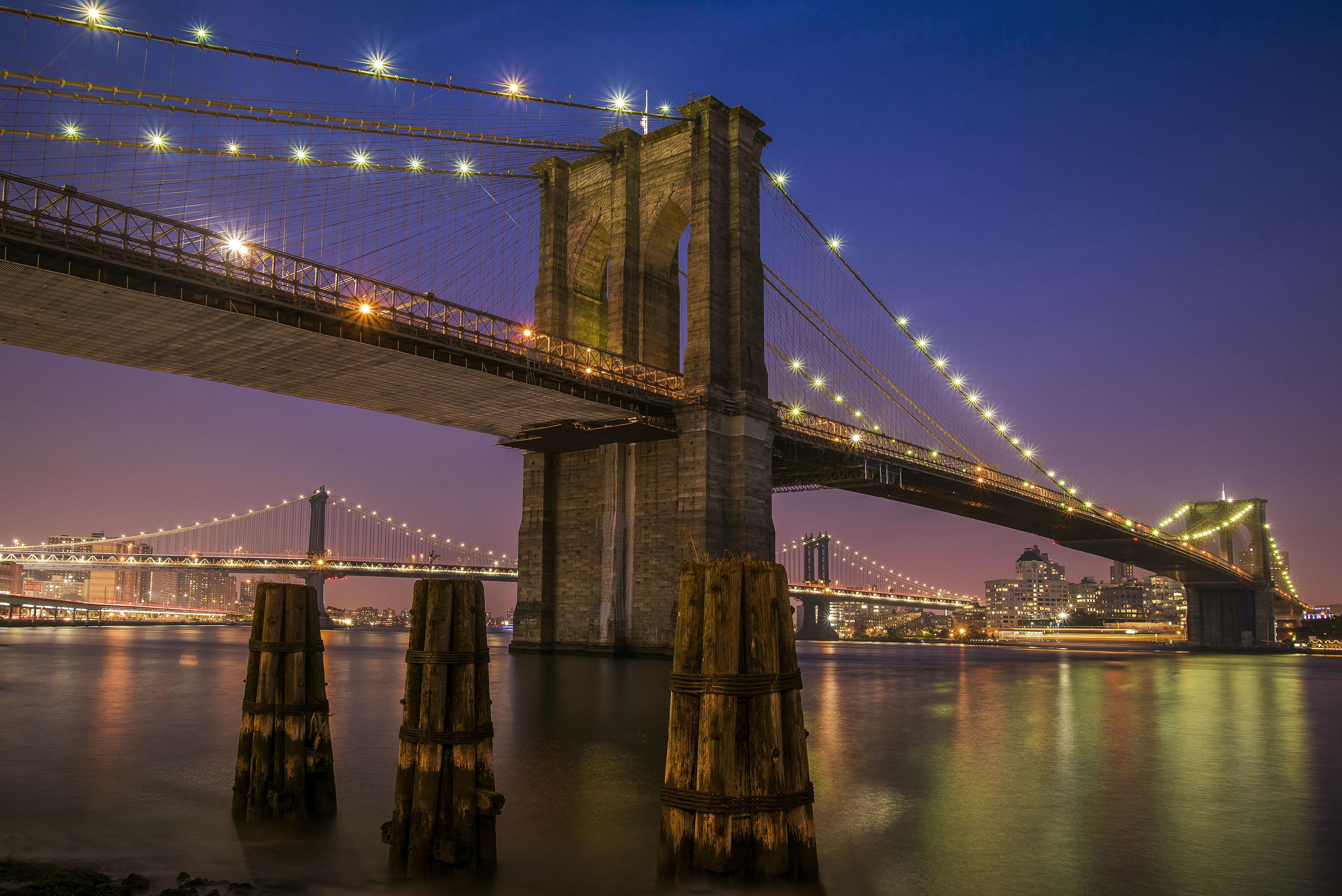
- Brooklyn Heights (foreground) and Downtown Brooklyn seen from Lower Manhattan Prospect Park Coney Island Williamsburgh Savings Bank Tower Brooklyn Museum Borough Hall Barclays Center Brooklyn College Brooklyn Central Library Brooklyn Bridge

- Flag Seal County seal (Note: The seal of Kings County is only used by the county clerk and other state supreme court officials, as described in NY Jud L § 30-A (2025).)
- Motto: Eendraght Maeckt Maght (Dutch) ("In unity there is strength")
- Interactive map of Brooklyn
- Location within New York City Location within the State of New York Location within the United States Location on Earth
- Coordinates: 40°39′N 73°57′W
- Country: United States
- State: New York
- County: Kings (coterminous)
- City: New York City
- Settled: 1634
- Named for: Breukelen, Netherlands

Government
  - Type: Borough
  - Borough President: Antonio Reynoso (D) — (Borough of Brooklyn)
  - District Attorney: Eric Gonzalez (D) — (Kings County)

Area
  - Total: 97 sq mi (250 km^{2})
  - Land: 70.82 sq mi (183.4 km^{2})
  - Water: 26 sq mi (67 km^{2}) 27%
- Highest elevation: 220 ft (67 m)

Population (2020)
  - Total: 2,736,074
  - Estimate (2025): 2,653,963 ▼
  - Density: 39,336/sq mi (15,188/km^{2})
  - Demonym: Brooklynite

GDP
  - Total: US$145.934 billion (2024)
  - Per capita: US$54,890 (2024)
- ZIP Code prefix: 112
- Area codes: 718/347/929/465, 917
- Congressional districts: 7th, 8th, 9th, 10th, 11th
- Website: brooklynbp.nyc.gov

Brooklyn, coextensive with Kings County, is the most populous of the five boroughs and counties of New York City, New York. Located at the westernmost end of Long Island and formerly an independent city, Brooklyn shares a land border with the borough and county of Queens. It has several bridge and tunnel connections to the borough of Manhattan, across the East River, including the architecturally significant Brooklyn Bridge, and is connected to Staten Island by the Verrazzano–Narrows Bridge.

The borough, as Kings County, at 37,339.9 inhabitants per square mile (14,417.0/km^{2}), is the second most densely populated county, and New York City borough, in the U.S. after Manhattan (New York County), and the most populous county in the state, as of 2022. In the 2020 United States census, the borough had a population of 2,736,074. Had Brooklyn remained an independent city on Long Island, it would now be the fourth most populous American city after the rest of New York City, Los Angeles, and Chicago. With a land area of 69.38 square miles (179.7 km^{2}) and a water area of 27.48 square miles (71.2 km^{2}), Kings County, one of the twelve original counties established under British rule in 1683 in the then-province of New York, is the state of New York's fourth-smallest county by land area and third smallest by total area.

Brooklyn, named after the Dutch town of Breukelen, was founded by the Dutch in the 17th century and grew into a busy port city on New York Harbor by the 19th century. On January 1, 1898, after a long political campaign and public-relations battle during the 1890s and despite opposition from Brooklyn residents, Brooklyn was consolidated and annexed, along with other areas, to form the current five-borough structure of New York City in accordance with the new municipal charter of Greater New York. The borough continues to maintain a distinct culture. Many Brooklyn neighborhoods are ethnic enclaves. With Jews forming around a fifth of its population, the borough has been described as one of the main global hubs for Jewish culture. Brooklyn's official motto, displayed on the borough seal and flag, is Een Draght Mackt Maght, which translates from early modern Dutch as "In unity there is strength".

Educational institutions in Brooklyn include the City University of New York's Brooklyn College, Medgar Evers College, and College of Technology, as well as Pratt Institute, Long Island University, and the New York University Tandon School of Engineering. In sports, basketball's Brooklyn Nets and New York Liberty play at the Barclays Center. In the first decades of the 21st century, Brooklyn has experienced a renaissance as a destination for hipsters, with associated gentrification, dramatic house-price increases, and a decrease in housing affordability. Some new developments are now required to include affordable housing units. Since the 2010s, parts of Brooklyn have evolved into a hub for entrepreneurship, startup firms, postmodern art, and design.

== Toponymy ==
The name Brooklyn is derived from the town of Breukelen in the Dutch province of Utrecht. This form is made up of the words broeck, meaning bog or marshland, and lede, meaning small (dug) water stream, specifically in peat areas. Breuckelen on the American continent was established in 1646, and the name first appeared in print in 1663.

Over the past two millennia, the name of the ancient town in the Netherlands has been Bracola, Broccke, Brocckede, Broiclede, Brocklandia, Broekclen, Broikelen, Breuckelen, and finally Breukelen. The New Amsterdam settlement of Breuckelen also went through many spelling variations, including Breucklyn, Breuckland, Brucklyn, Broucklyn, Brookland, Brockland, Brocklin, and Brookline/Brook-line. There have been so many variations of the name that its origin has been debated; some have claimed breuckelen means "broken land". The current name, however, is the one that best reflects its meaning.

The county's name, Kings County, was named after King Charles II of England, who ruled from 1660 to 1685.

== History ==
The history of European settlement in Brooklyn spans more than 350 years. The settlement began in the 17th century as the small Dutch-founded town of "Breuckelen" on the East River shore of Long Island, grew to be a sizeable city in the 19th century and was consolidated in 1898 with New York City (then confined to Manhattan and the Bronx), the remaining rural areas of Kings County, and the largely rural areas of Queens and Staten Island, to form the modern City of New York.

=== Colonial Era ===
==== New Netherland ====
The Dutch were the first Europeans to settle Long Island's western edge, which was then largely inhabited by the Lenape, an Algonquian-speaking American Indian tribe often referred to in European documents by a variation of the place name "Canarsie". Bands were associated with place names, but the colonists thought their names represented different tribes. The Breuckelen settlement was named after Breukelen in the Netherlands; it was part of New Netherland. The Dutch West India Company lost little time in chartering the six original parishes (listed here by their later English town names):

- Gravesend: in 1645, settled under Dutch patent by English followers of Anabaptist Deborah Moody, named for 's-Gravenzande, Netherlands, or Gravesend, England;
- Brooklyn Heights: chartered as Breuckelen in 1646, after the town now spelled Breukelen, Netherlands. Breuckelen was along Fulton Street (now Fulton Mall) between Hoyt Street and Smith Street (according to H. Stiles and P. Ross). Brooklyn Heights, or Clover Hill, is where the village of Brooklyn was founded in 1816;
- Flatlands: chartered as Nieuw Amersfoort in 1647;
- Flatbush: chartered as Midwout in 1652;
- Nieuw Utrecht in 1652, named after the city of Utrecht, Netherlands; and
- Bushwick: chartered as Boswijck in 1661.

The colony's capital of New Amsterdam, across the East River, obtained its charter in 1653. The neighborhood of Marine Park was home to North America's first tide mill. It was built by the Dutch, and the foundation can be seen today. But the area was not formally settled as a town. Many incidents and documents relating to this period are in Gabriel Furman's 1824 compilation.

==== Province of New York ====
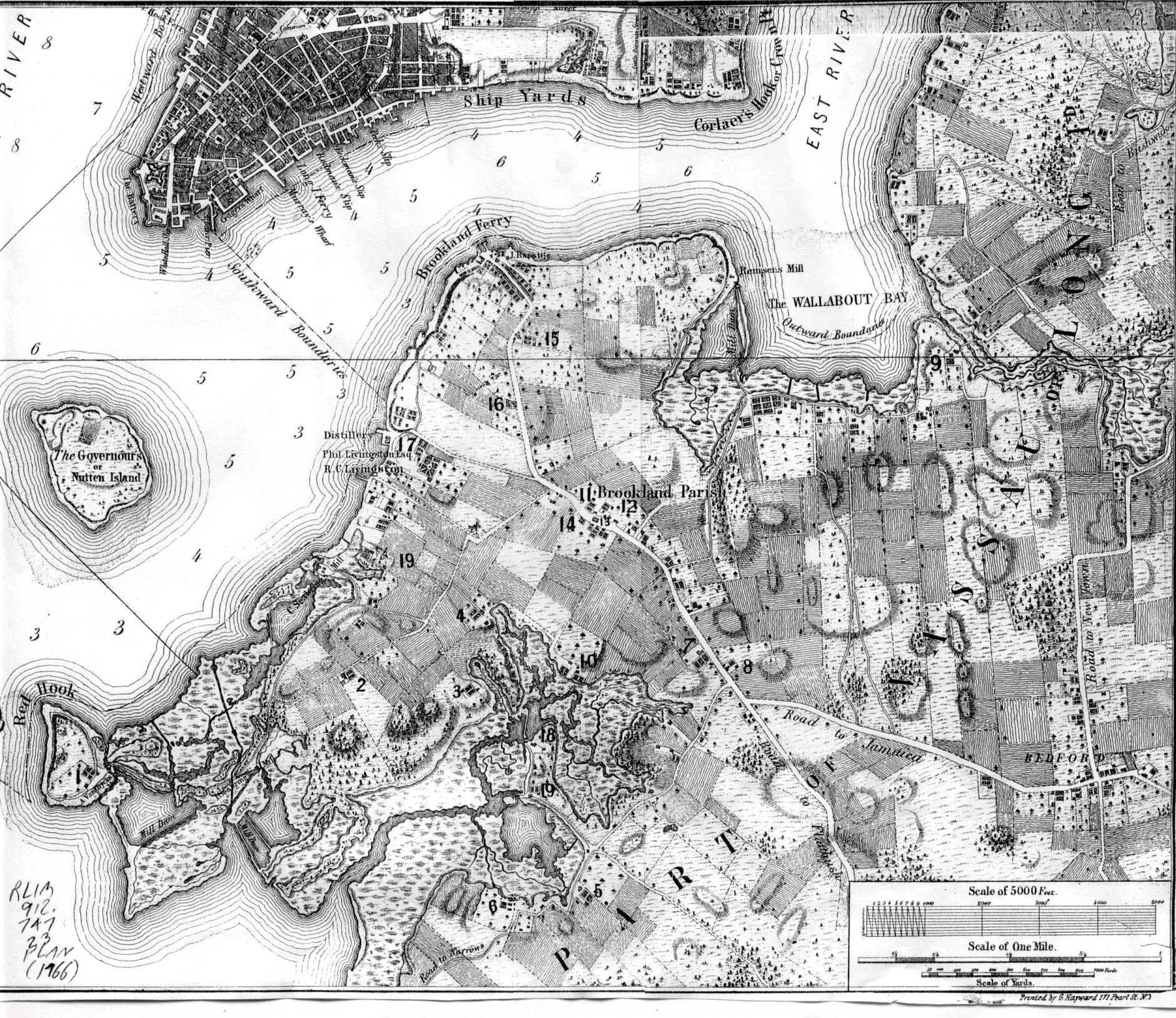
Village of Brooklyn and environs, 1766

Present-day Brooklyn left Dutch hands after the English conquest of New Netherland in 1664, which sparked the Second Anglo-Dutch War. New Netherland was taken in a naval action, and the English renamed the new capture for their naval commander, James, Duke of York, brother of the then monarch King Charles II and future king himself as King James II. Brooklyn became a part of the West Riding of York Shire in the Province of New York, one of the Middle Colonies in England's North American colonies.

On November 1, 1683, Kings County was partitioned from the West Riding of York Shire, containing the six old Dutch towns on southwestern Long Island, as one of the "original twelve counties". This tract of land was recognized as a political entity for the first time, and the municipal groundwork was laid for a later expansive idea of a Brooklyn identity.

Lacking the patroon and tenant farmer system established along the Hudson River Valley, this agricultural county unusually came to have one of the highest percentages of slaves among the population in the "Original Thirteen Colonies" along the Atlantic Ocean eastern coast of North America.

==== Revolutionary War ====
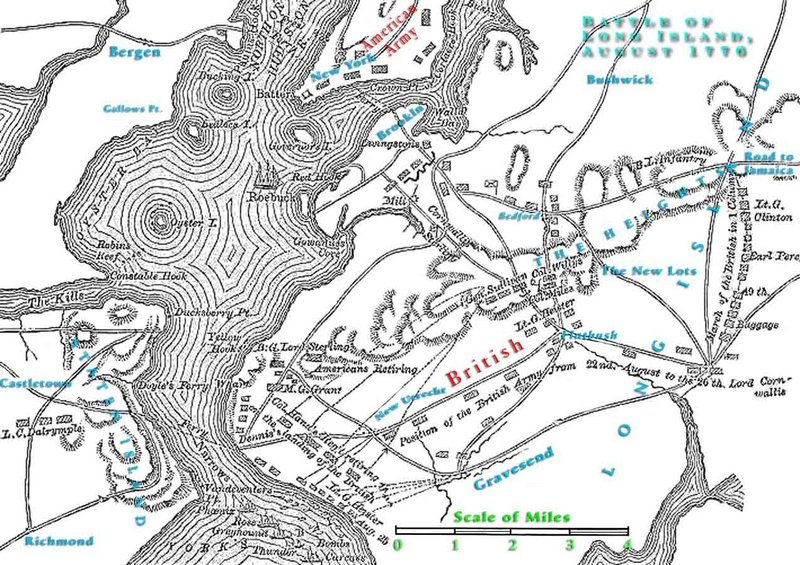
The American Revolution's Battle of Long Island was fought across Kings County.

On August 27, 1776, the Battle of Long Island (also known as the 'Battle of Brooklyn') was fought, the first major engagement fought in the American Revolutionary War after independence was declared, and the largest of the entire conflict. British troops forced the Continental Army under George Washington off the heights near the modern sites of Green-Wood Cemetery, Prospect Park, and Grand Army Plaza.

Washington, viewing particularly fierce fighting at the Gowanus Creek and Old Stone House from atop a hill near the west end of present-day Atlantic Avenue, was reported to have emotionally exclaimed: "What brave men I must this day lose!".

The fortified American positions at Brooklyn Heights consequently became untenable and were evacuated a few days later, leaving the British in control of New York Harbor. While Washington's defeat on the battlefield cast early doubts on his ability as the commander, the tactical withdrawal of all his troops and supplies across the East River in a single night is now seen by historians as one of his most brilliant triumphs.

The British controlled the surrounding region for the duration of the war, as New York City was soon occupied and became their military and political base of operations in British-held North America for the remainder of the conflict. The Patriot residents largely fled or changed their political sentiments, and afterward the British generally enjoyed a dominant Loyalist sentiment from the residents in Kings County who did not evacuate, though the region was also the center of the fledgling—and largely successful—Patriot intelligence network, headed by Washington himself.

The British set up a system of prison ships off the coast of Brooklyn in Wallabout Bay. More American prisoners of war died on these prison ships than were killed in action on all the battlefield engagements of the war combined. One result of the Treaty of Paris in 1783 was the evacuation of the British from New York City, which was celebrated by New Yorkers into the 20th century.

=== Post-independence era ===
==== Urbanization ====
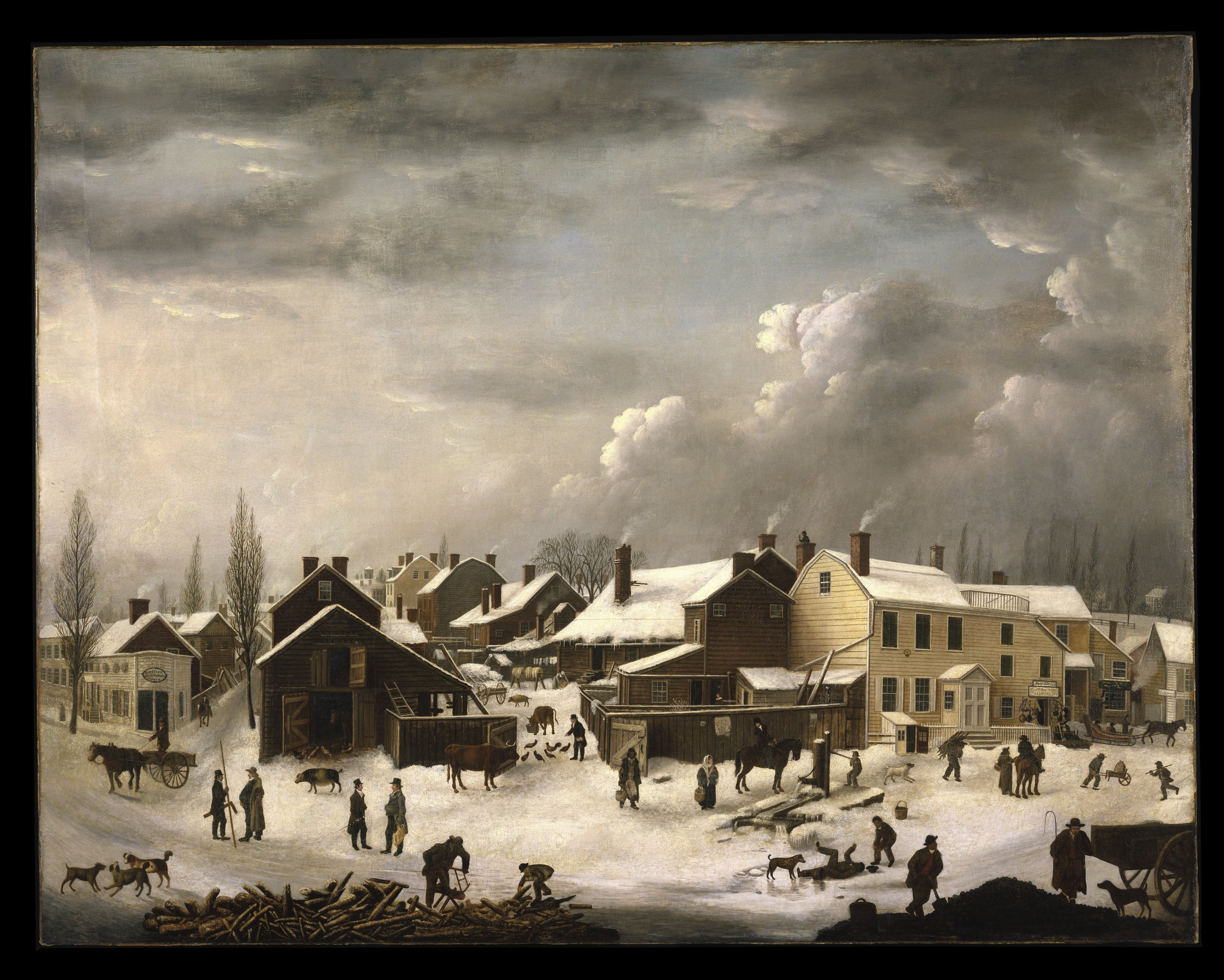
Winter Scene in Brooklyn, c. 1819–20, by Francis Guy (Brooklyn Museum)

The first half of the 19th century saw the beginning of the development of urban areas on the economically strategic East River shore of Kings County, facing the adolescent City of New York confined to Manhattan Island. The New York Navy Yard operated in Wallabout Bay (border between Fort Greene and Williamsburg) during the 19th century and two-thirds of the 20th century.

The first center of urbanization sprang up in the Town of Brooklyn, directly across from Lower Manhattan, which saw the incorporation of the Village of Brooklyn in 1816. Reliable steam ferry service across the East River to Fulton Landing converted Brooklyn Heights into a commuter town for Wall Street. Ferry Road to Jamaica Pass became Fulton Street to East New York. Town and Village were combined to form the first, kernel incarnation of the City of Brooklyn in 1834.

In a parallel development, the Town of Bushwick, farther up the river, saw the incorporation of the Village of Williamsburgh in 1827, which separated as the Town of Williamsburgh in 1840 and formed the short-lived City of Williamsburgh in 1851. Industrial deconcentration in the mid-century was bringing shipbuilding and other manufacturing to the northern part of the county. Each of the two cities and six towns in Kings County remained independent municipalities and purposely created non-aligning street grids with different naming systems.

However, the East River shore was growing too fast for the three-year-old infant City of Williamsburg; it, along with its Town of Bushwick hinterland, was subsumed within a greater City of Brooklyn in 1855, subsequently dropping the 'h' from its name.

By 1841, with the appearance of The Brooklyn Eagle, and Kings County Democrat published by Alfred G. Stevens, the growing city across the East River from Manhattan was producing its own prominent newspaper. It later became the most popular and highest circulation afternoon paper in America. The publisher changed to L. Van Anden on April 19, 1842, and the paper was renamed The Brooklyn Daily Eagle and Kings County Democrat on June 1, 1846. On May 14, 1849, the name was shortened to The Brooklyn Daily Eagle; on September 5, 1938, it was further shortened to Brooklyn Eagle. The establishment of the paper in the 1840s helped develop a separate identity for Brooklynites over the next century. The borough's soon-to-be-famous National League baseball team, the Brooklyn Dodgers, also assisted with this. Both major institutions were lost in the 1950s: the paper closed in 1955 after unsuccessful attempts at a sale following a reporters' strike, and the baseball team decamped for Los Angeles in a realignment of Major League Baseball in 1957.

Agitation against Southern slavery was stronger in Brooklyn than in New York, and under Republican leadership, the city was fervent in the Union cause in the Civil War. After the war the Henry Ward Beecher Monument was built downtown to honor a famous local abolitionist. A great victory arch was built at what was then the south end of town to celebrate the armed forces; this place is now called Grand Army Plaza.

The number of people living in Brooklyn grew rapidly early in the 19th century. There were 4,402 by 1810, 7,175 in 1820 and 15,396 by 1830. The city's population was 25,000 in 1834, but the police department comprised only 12 men on the day shift and another 12 on the night shift. Every time a rash of burglaries broke out, officials blamed burglars from New York City. Finally, in 1855, a modern police force was created, employing 150 men. Voters complained of inadequate protection and excessive costs. In 1857, the state legislature merged the Brooklyn force with that of New York City.

==== Civil War ====
Fervent in the Union cause, the city of Brooklyn played a major role in supplying troops and materiel for the American Civil War. The best-known regiment to be sent off to war from the city was the 14th Brooklyn "Red Legged Devils". They fought from 1861 to 1864, wore red the entire war, and were the only regiment named after a city. President Abraham Lincoln called them into service, making them part of a handful of three-year enlisted soldiers in April 1861. Unlike other regiments during the American Civil War, the 14th wore a uniform inspired by the French Chasseurs, a light infantry used for quick assaults.

As a seaport and a manufacturing center, Brooklyn was well prepared to contribute to the Union's strengths in shipping and manufacturing. The two combined in shipbuilding; the ironclad Monitor was built in Brooklyn.

==== Twin city ====
Brooklyn is referred to as the twin city of New York in the 1883 poem, "The New Colossus" by Emma Lazarus, which appears on a plaque inside the Statue of Liberty. The poem calls New York Harbor "the air-bridged harbor that twin cities frame". As a twin city to New York, it played a role in national affairs that was later overshadowed by decades of subordination by its old partner and rival.

During this period, the affluent, contiguous districts of Fort Greene and Clinton Hill (then characterized collectively as The Hill) were home to such notable figures as Astral Oil Works founder Charles Pratt and his children, including local civic leader Charles Millard Pratt; Theosophical Society co-founder William Quan Judge; Underwood Typewriter Company founder John Thomas Underwood (who funded the prominent Korea-based Presbyterian missionary work of his younger brother, Horace Grant Underwood); diversified coffee (Yuban)-sugar magnate/hotelier/publisher John Arbuckle; and Pfizer co-founders Charles Pfizer and Charles F. Erhart. Brooklyn Heights remained one of the New York metropolitan area's most august patrician redoubts into the early 20th century under the aegis of such figures as abolitionist clergyman Henry Ward Beecher, Congregationalist theologians Lyman Abbott and Newell Dwight Hillis (who followed Beecher as the second and third pastors of Plymouth Church, respectively), financier John Jay Pierrepont (a grandson of founding Heights resident Hezekiah Pierrepont), banker/art collector David Leavitt, educator/politician Seth Low, merchant/banker Horace Brigham Claflin, attorney William Cary Sanger (who served for two years as United States Assistant Secretary of War under presidents William McKinley and Theodore Roosevelt) and publisher Alfred Smith Barnes. Contiguous to the Heights, the less exclusive South Brooklyn was home to longtime civic leader James S. T. Stranahan, who became known (often derisively) as the "Baron Haussmann of Brooklyn" for championing Prospect Park and other public works.

Economic growth continued, propelled by immigration and industrialization, and Brooklyn established itself as the third-most populous American city for much of the 19th century. The waterfront from Gowanus to Greenpoint was developed with piers and factories. Industrial access to the waterfront was improved by the Gowanus Canal and the canalized Newtown Creek. USS Monitor was the most famous product of the large and growing shipbuilding industry of Williamsburg. After the Civil War, trolley lines and other transport brought urban sprawl beyond Prospect Park (completed by Frederick Law Olmsted and Calvert Vaux in 1873 and widely heralded as an improvement upon the earlier Central Park) into the center of the county, as evinced by gradual settlement in the comparatively rustic villages of Windsor Terrace and Kensington in the Town of Flatbush. By century's end, Dean Alvord's Prospect Park South development (adjacent to the village of Flatbush) would serve as the template for contemporaneous "Victorian Flatbush" micro-neighborhoods and the post-consolidation emergence of outlying districts, such as Midwood and Marine Park. Along with Oak Park, Illinois, it also presaged the automobile and commuter rail-driven vogue for more remote prewar suburban communities, such as Garden City, New York and Montclair, New Jersey.

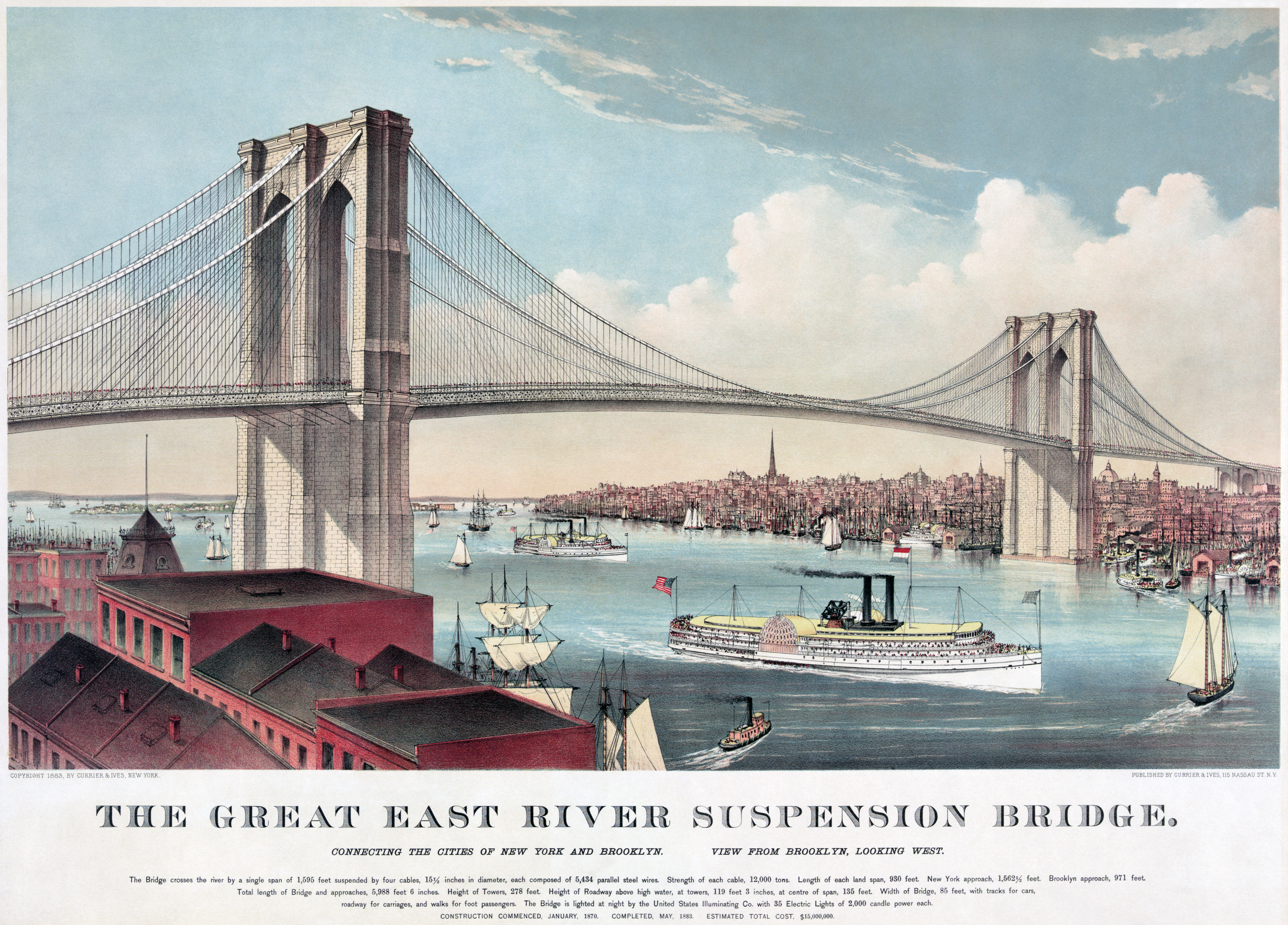
Brooklyn Bridge in 1883, by Currier and Ives

The rapidly growing population needed more water, so the City built centralized waterworks, including the Ridgewood Reservoir. The municipal Police Department, however, was abolished in 1854 in favor of a Metropolitan force covering also New York and Westchester Counties. In 1865 the Brooklyn Fire Department (BFD) also gave way to the new Metropolitan Fire District.

Throughout this period the peripheral towns of Kings County, far from Manhattan and even from urban Brooklyn, maintained their rustic independence. The only municipal change seen was the secession of the eastern section of the Town of Flatbush as the Town of New Lots in 1852. The building of rail links such as the Brighton Beach Line in 1878 heralded the end of this isolation.

Sports in Brooklyn became a business. The Brooklyn Bridegrooms played professional baseball at Washington Park in the convenient suburb of Park Slope and elsewhere. Early in the next century, under their new name of Brooklyn Dodgers, they brought baseball to Ebbets Field, beyond Prospect Park. Racetracks, amusement parks, and beach resorts opened in Brighton Beach, Coney Island, and elsewhere in the southern part of the county.

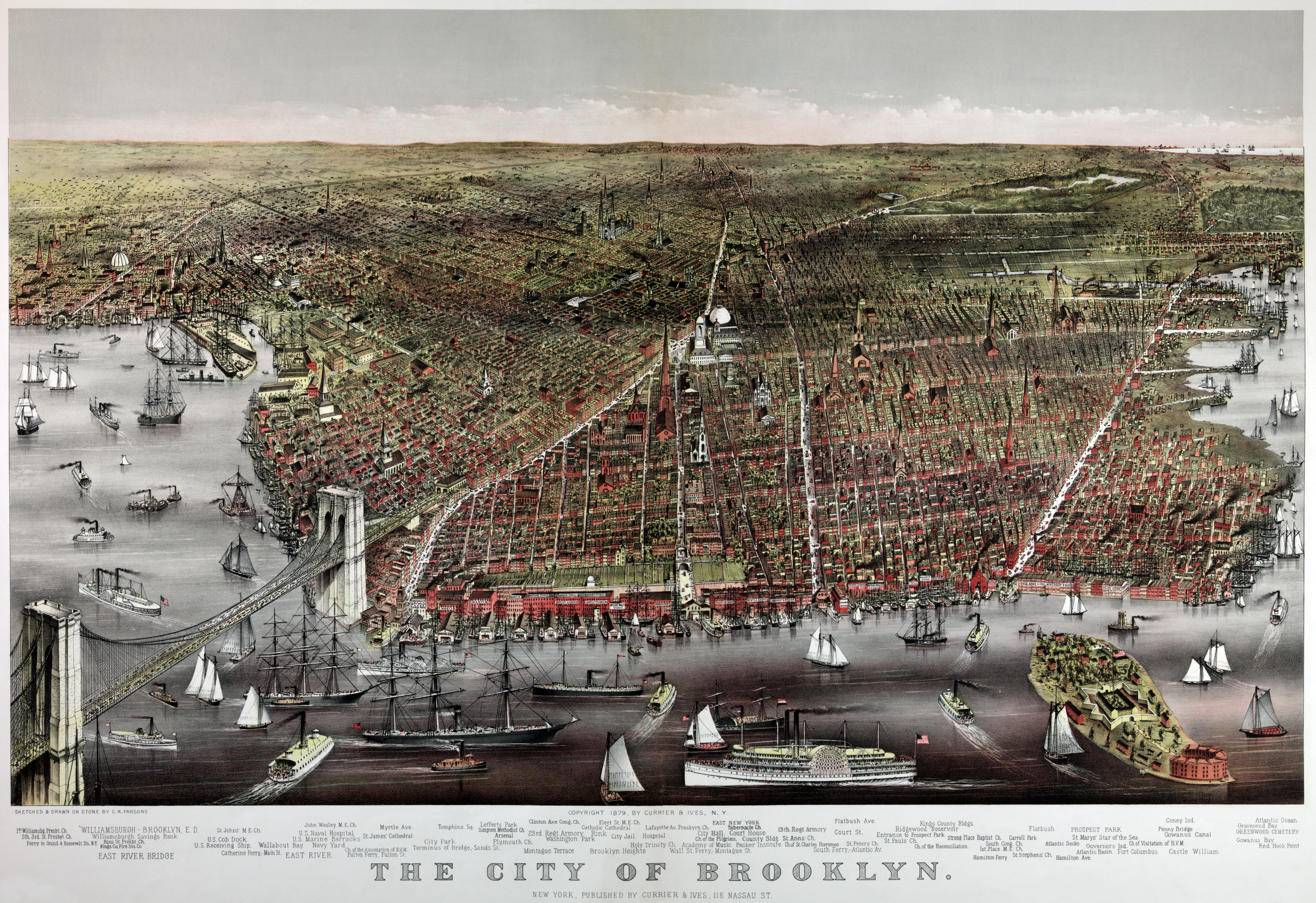
Currier and Ives print of Brooklyn, 1886

Toward the end of the 19th century, the City of Brooklyn experienced its final, explosive growth spurt. Park Slope was rapidly urbanized, with its eastern summit soon emerging as the city's third "Gold Coast" district alongside Brooklyn Heights and The Hill; notable residents of the era included American Chicle Company co-founder Thomas Adams Jr. and New York Central Railroad executive Clinton L. Rossiter. East of The Hill, Bedford-Stuyvesant coalesced as an upper middle class enclave for lawyers, shopkeepers, and merchants of German and Irish descent (notably exemplified by John C. Kelley, a water meter magnate and close friend of President Grover Cleveland), with nearby Crown Heights gradually fulfilling an analogous role for the city's Jewish population as development continued through the early 20th century. Northeast of Bedford-Stuyvesant, Bushwick (by now a working class, predominantly German district) established a considerable brewery industry; the so-called "Brewer's Row" encompassed 14 breweries operating in a 14-block area in 1890. On the southwestern waterfront of Kings County, railroads and industrialization spread to Sunset Park (then coterminous with the city's sprawling, sparsely populated Eighth Ward) and adjacent Bay Ridge (hitherto a resort-like subsection of the Town of New Utrecht). Within a decade, the city had annexed the Town of New Lots in 1886; the Towns of Flatbush, Gravesend and New Utrecht in 1894; and the Town of Flatlands in 1896. Brooklyn had reached its natural municipal boundaries at the ends of Kings County.

===== Seth Low as mayor =====
Low's time in office from 1882 to 1885 was marked by a number of reforms:

- Secured a degree of "home rule" of the city. Previously, the State Government dictated city policies, hiring, salaries, and other affairs. Low managed to secure an unofficial veto over all Brooklyn bills in the State Assembly.
- Instituted a number of educational reforms. He was the first to integrate Brooklyn schools. He introduced free textbooks for all students, not just those who had taken a pauper's oath. He instituted a competitive examination for hiring teachers, instead of giving teaching jobs to pay political debts. He set aside $430,000 (equivalent to $14,345,690 in 2025) for the construction of new schools to accommodate 10,000 new students.
- Introduced Civil Service Code to all city employees, eliminating patronage jobs.
- German Americans wanted to enjoy their local beer gardens on the Sabbath, in violation of state "dry" laws and the demands of local puritanical clergy. Low's compromise solution was that saloons could stay open as long as they were orderly. At the first sign of rowdiness, they would be closed.
- Served as a member of the board of the New York Bridge Company, the company that built the Brooklyn Bridge, and led an unsuccessful effort to remove Washington Roebling as the chief engineer on that project.
- Raised the tax rate from 2.33% of $100 assessed valuation in 1881 to 2.59% in 1883. He also went after property owners who had not paid back taxes. This increase in city revenue enabled him to reduce the city's debt and increase services. However, raising taxes proved extremely unpopular.

===== Mayors of the City of Brooklyn =====
Brooklyn elected a mayor from 1834 until 1898, after which it was consolidated into the City of Greater New York, the second mayor of which (1902–1903), Seth Low, had been Mayor of Brooklyn from 1881 to 1885. Since 1898, Brooklyn has, in place of a separate mayor, elected a Borough President.

List of mayors of the City of Brooklyn
No.	Name (birth–death)	Term	Party
1	George Hall (1795–1868); 1st term	1834	Whig
2	Jonathan Trotter (c. 1797–1865)	1835–1836	Democratic
3	Jeremiah Johnson (1766–1852)	1837–1838	Whig
4	Cyrus P. Smith (1800–1877)	1839–1841	Whig
5	Henry C. Murphy (1810–1882)	1842	Democratic
6	Joseph Sprague (1783–1854)	1843–1844	Democratic
7	Thomas G. Talmage (1801–1863)	1845	Democratic
8	Francis B. Stryker (1811–1892)	1846–1849	Whig
9	Edward Copland (1793–1859)	1849–1850	Whig
10	Samuel Smith (1788–1872)	1850	Democratic
11	Conklin Brush (1794–1870)	1851–1852	Whig
12	Edward A. Lambert (1813–1885)	1853–1854	Democratic
13	George Hall (1795–1868); 2nd term	1855–1856	American
14	Samuel S. Powell (1815–1879); 1st term	1857–1860	Democratic
15	Martin Kalbfleisch (1804–1873); 1st term	1861–1863	Democratic
16	Alfred M. Wood (1825–1895)	1864–1865	Republican
17	Samuel Booth (1818–1894)	1866–1867	Republican
18	Martin Kalbfleisch (1804–1873); 2nd term	1868–1871	Democratic
19	Samuel S. Powell (1815–1879); 2nd term	1872–1873	Democratic
20	John W. Hunter (1807–1900)	1874–1875	Democratic
21	Frederick A. Schroeder (1833–1899)	1876–1877	Republican
22	James Howell (1829–1897)	1878–1880	Democratic
23	Seth Low (1850–1916)	1881–1885	Republican
24	Daniel D. Whitney (1819–1914)	1886–1887	Democratic
25	Alfred C. Chapin (1848–1936)	1888–1891	Democratic
26	David A. Boody (1837–1930)	1892–1893	Democratic
27	Charles A. Schieren (1842–1915)	1894–1895	Republican
28	Frederick W. Wurster (1850–1917)	1896–1897	Republican

=== New York City borough ===
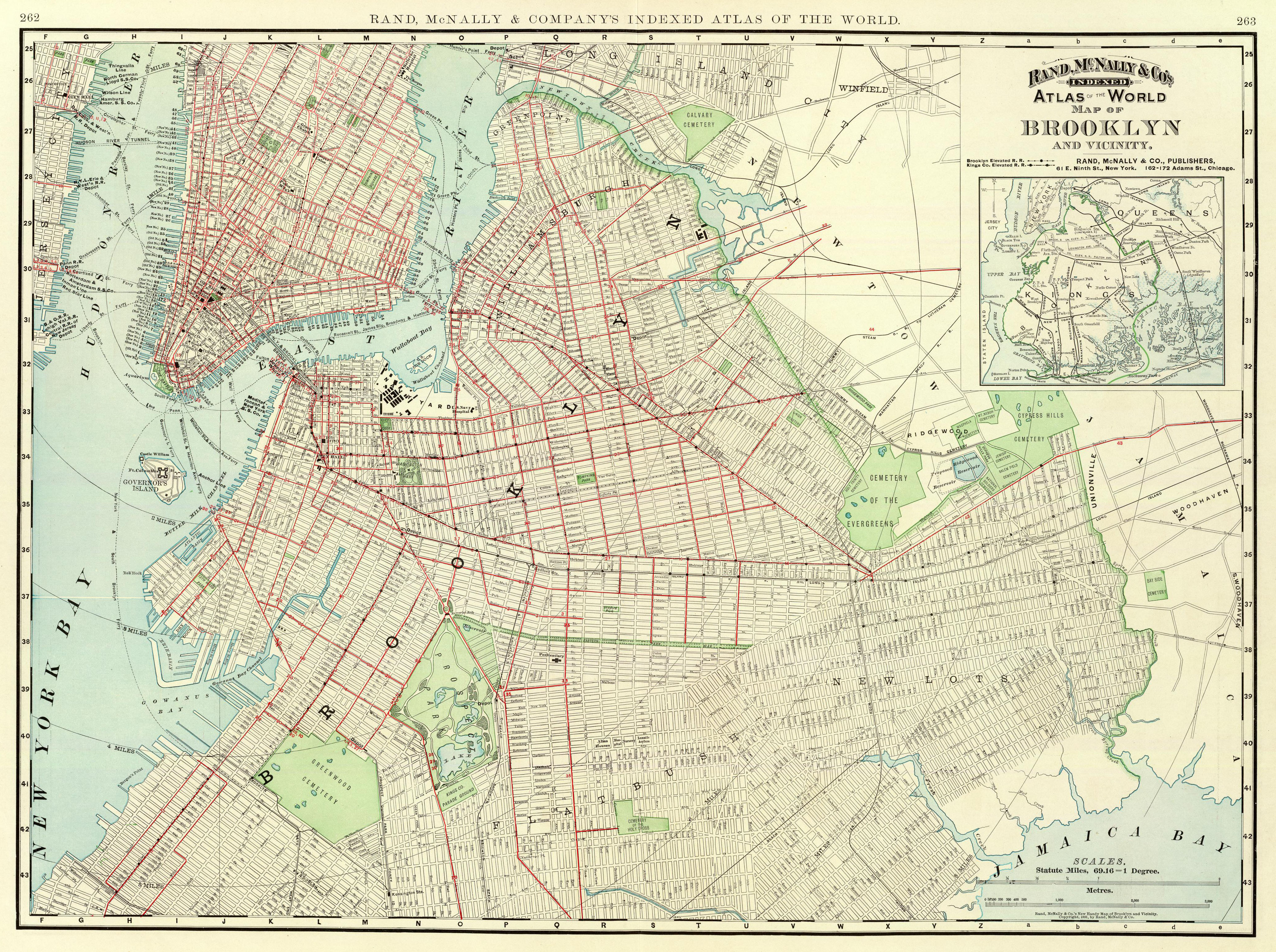
Brooklyn in 1897

In 1883, the Brooklyn Bridge was completed, transportation to Manhattan was no longer by water only, and the City of Brooklyn's ties to the City of New York were strengthened.

The question became whether Brooklyn was prepared to engage in the still-grander process of consolidation then developing throughout the region, whether to join with the county of Richmond and the western portion of Queens County, and the county of New York, which by then already included the Bronx, to form the five boroughs of a united City of New York. Andrew Haswell Green and other progressives said yes, and eventually, they prevailed against the Daily Eagle and other conservative forces. In 1894, residents of Brooklyn and the other counties voted by a slight majority to merge, effective in 1898.

Kings County retained its status as one of New York State's counties, but the loss of Brooklyn's separate identity as a city was met with consternation by some residents at the time. Many newspapers of the day called the merger the "Great Mistake of 1898".

== Geography ==
Location of Brooklyn (red) within New York City (remainder yellow)

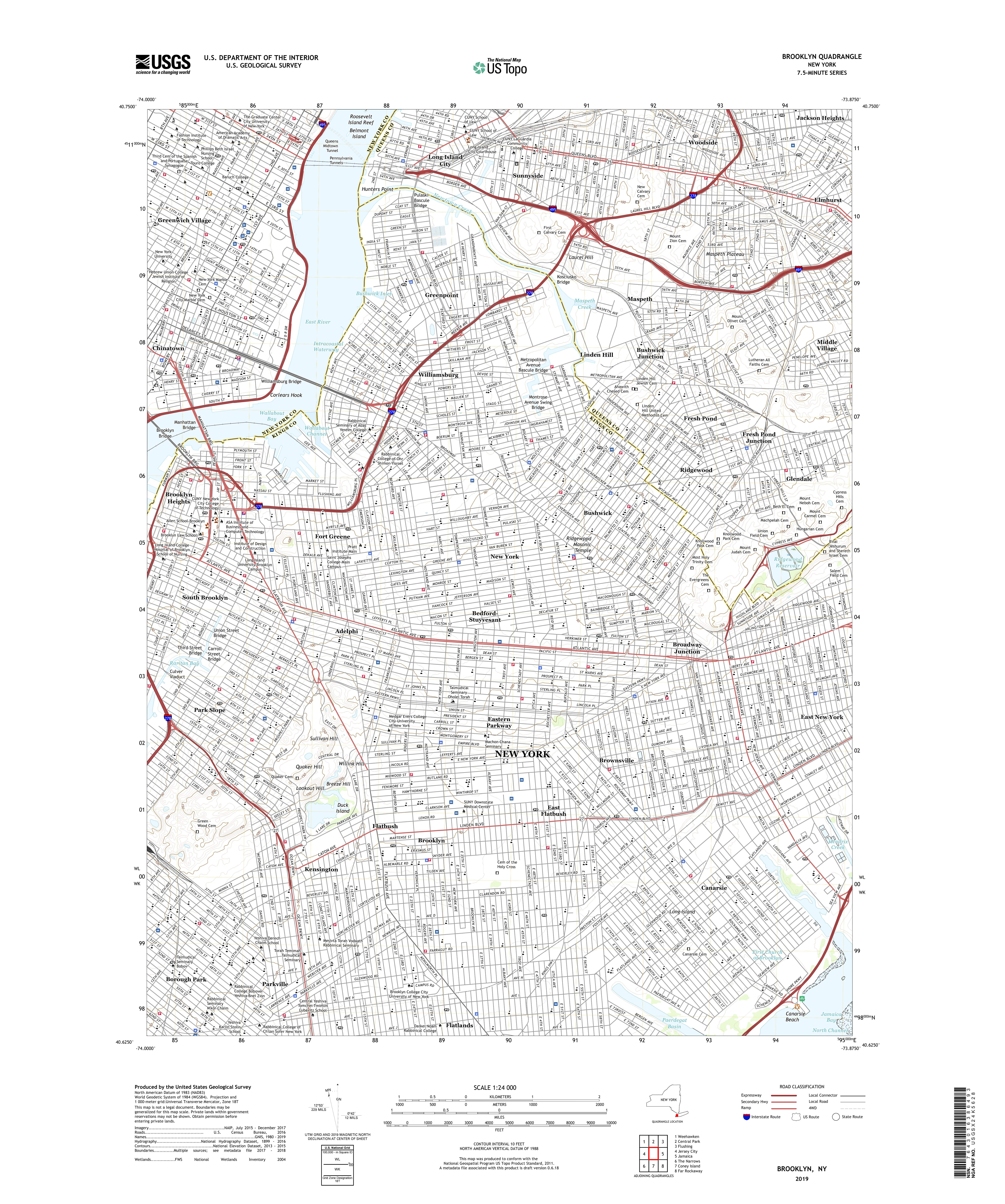
USGS map of Brooklyn (2019)

Brooklyn is 97 square miles (250 km^{2}) in area, of which 71 square miles (180 km^{2}) is land (73%), and 26 square miles (67 km^{2}) is water (27%); the borough is the second-largest by land area among the New York City's boroughs. However, Kings County, coterminous with Brooklyn, is New York State's fourth-smallest county by land area and third-smallest by total area. Brooklyn lies at the southwestern end of Long Island, and the borough's western border constitutes the island's western tip.

Brooklyn's water borders are extensive and varied, including Jamaica Bay; the Atlantic Ocean; The Narrows, separating Brooklyn from the borough of Staten Island in New York City and crossed by the Verrazzano–Narrows Bridge; Upper New York Bay, separating Brooklyn from Jersey City and Bayonne in the U.S. state of New Jersey; and the East River, separating Brooklyn from the borough of Manhattan in New York City and traversed by the Brooklyn-Battery Tunnel, the Brooklyn Bridge, the Manhattan Bridge, the Williamsburg Bridge, and numerous routes of the New York City Subway. To the east of Brooklyn lies the borough of Queens, which contains John F. Kennedy International Airport in that borough's Jamaica neighborhood, approximately two miles from the border of Brooklyn's East New York neighborhood.

=== Climate ===
Under the Köppen climate classification, Brooklyn experiences a humid subtropical climate (Cfa), with partial shielding from the Appalachian Mountains and moderating influences from the Atlantic Ocean. Brooklyn receives plentiful precipitation all year round, with nearly 50 in (1,300 mm) yearly. Snowfall is most common in February with around 20–21 centimeters or 8.3–8.5 inches. Temperatures range from 3.9 °C (39.0 °F) to 28.4 °C. The area averages 234 days with at least some sunshine annually, and averages 57% of possible sunshine annually, accumulating 2,535 hours of sunshine per annum. Brooklyn lies in the USDA plant hardiness zone 7b.

Climate data for JFK Airport, New York (normals 1981–2010, extremes 1948–present)
Month	Jan	Feb	Mar	Apr	May	Jun	Jul	Aug	Sep	Oct	Nov	Dec	Year
Record high °F (°C)	71 (22)	71 (22)	85 (29)	90 (32)	99 (37)	99 (37)	104 (40)	101 (38)	98 (37)	90 (32)	77 (25)	75 (24)	104 (40)
Mean maximum °F (°C)	56.8 (13.8)	57.9 (14.4)	68.5 (20.3)	78.1 (25.6)	84.9 (29.4)	92.1 (33.4)	94.5 (34.7)	92.7 (33.7)	87.4 (30.8)	78.0 (25.6)	69.1 (20.6)	60.1 (15.6)	96.6 (35.9)
Mean daily maximum °F (°C)	39.1 (3.9)	41.8 (5.4)	49.0 (9.4)	59.0 (15.0)	68.5 (20.3)	78.0 (25.6)	83.2 (28.4)	81.9 (27.7)	75.3 (24.1)	64.5 (18.1)	54.3 (12.4)	44.0 (6.7)	61.6 (16.4)
Mean daily minimum °F (°C)	26.3 (−3.2)	28.1 (−2.2)	34.2 (1.2)	43.5 (6.4)	52.8 (11.6)	62.8 (17.1)	68.5 (20.3)	67.8 (19.9)	60.8 (16.0)	49.6 (9.8)	40.7 (4.8)	31.5 (−0.3)	47.3 (8.5)
Mean minimum °F (°C)	9.8 (−12.3)	13.4 (−10.3)	19.1 (−7.2)	32.6 (0.3)	42.6 (5.9)	52.7 (11.5)	60.7 (15.9)	58.6 (14.8)	49.2 (9.6)	37.6 (3.1)	27.4 (−2.6)	16.3 (−8.7)	7.5 (−13.6)
Record low °F (°C)	−2 (−19)	−2 (−19)	4 (−16)	20 (−7)	34 (1)	45 (7)	55 (13)	46 (8)	40 (4)	30 (−1)	19 (−7)	2 (−17)	−2 (−19)
Average precipitation inches (mm)	3.16 (80)	2.59 (66)	3.78 (96)	3.87 (98)	3.94 (100)	3.86 (98)	4.08 (104)	3.68 (93)	3.50 (89)	3.62 (92)	3.30 (84)	3.39 (86)	42.77 (1,086)
Average snowfall inches (cm)	6.3 (16)	8.3 (21)	3.5 (8.9)	0.8 (2.0)	0 (0)	0 (0)	0 (0)	0 (0)	0 (0)	0 (0)	0.2 (0.51)	4.7 (12)	23.8 (60)
Average precipitation days (≥ 0.01-inch)	10.5	9.6	11.0	11.4	11.5	10.7	9.4	8.7	8.1	8.5	9.4	10.6	119.4
Average snowy days (≥ 0.1 inch)	4.6	3.4	2.3	0.3	0	0	0	0	0	0	0.2	2.8	13.6
Average relative humidity (%)	64.9	64.4	63.4	64.1	69.5	71.5	71.4	71.7	71.9	69.1	67.9	66.3	68.0
Source: NOAA (relative humidity 1961–1990)

Climate data for Brooklyn, New York City (Avenue V)
Month	Jan	Feb	Mar	Apr	May	Jun	Jul	Aug	Sep	Oct	Nov	Dec	Year
Mean daily maximum °F (°C)	39.7 (4.3)	42.4 (5.8)	49.7 (9.8)	60.5 (15.8)	70.5 (21.4)	79.3 (26.3)	84.8 (29.3)	83.3 (28.5)	76.5 (24.7)	65.0 (18.3)	54.3 (12.4)	44.5 (6.9)	62.5 (16.9)
Mean daily minimum °F (°C)	27.5 (−2.5)	29.1 (−1.6)	35.2 (1.8)	44.8 (7.1)	54.4 (12.4)	64.0 (17.8)	70.3 (21.3)	68.9 (20.5)	62.4 (16.9)	51.2 (10.7)	41.4 (5.2)	33.2 (0.7)	48.5 (9.2)
Average precipitation inches (mm)	3.53 (90)	2.97 (75)	4.37 (111)	3.85 (98)	4.03 (102)	4.44 (113)	4.85 (123)	3.92 (100)	3.92 (100)	4.02 (102)	3.23 (82)	4.00 (102)	47.13 (1,197)
Average snowfall inches (cm)	6.5 (17)	8.5 (22)	4.4 (11)	0.6 (1.5)	0 (0)	0 (0)	0 (0)	0 (0)	0 (0)	0 (0)	0.2 (0.51)	4.3 (11)	24.5 (62)
Source: NOAA

=== Boroughscape ===
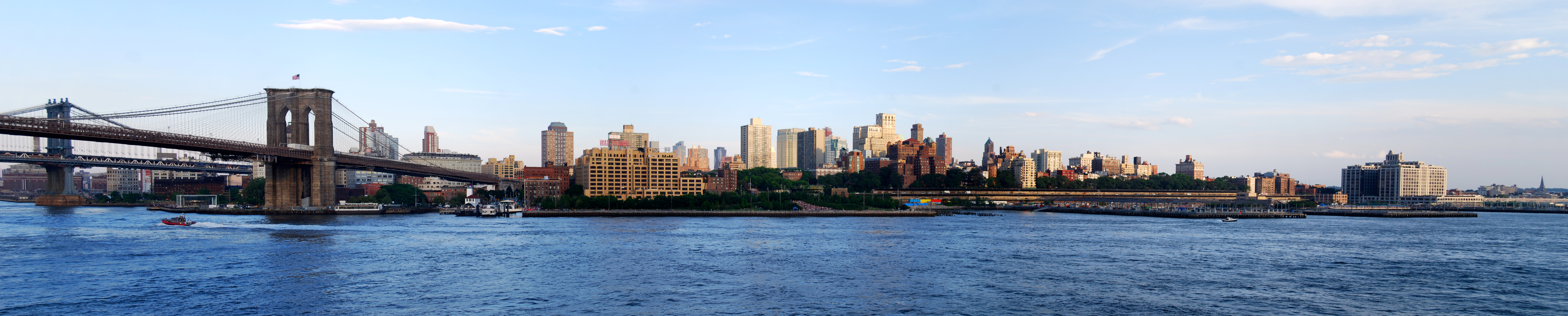
The Downtown Brooklyn skyline, the Manhattan Bridge (far left), and the Brooklyn Bridge (near left) are seen across the East River from Lower Manhattan at sunset in 2013.
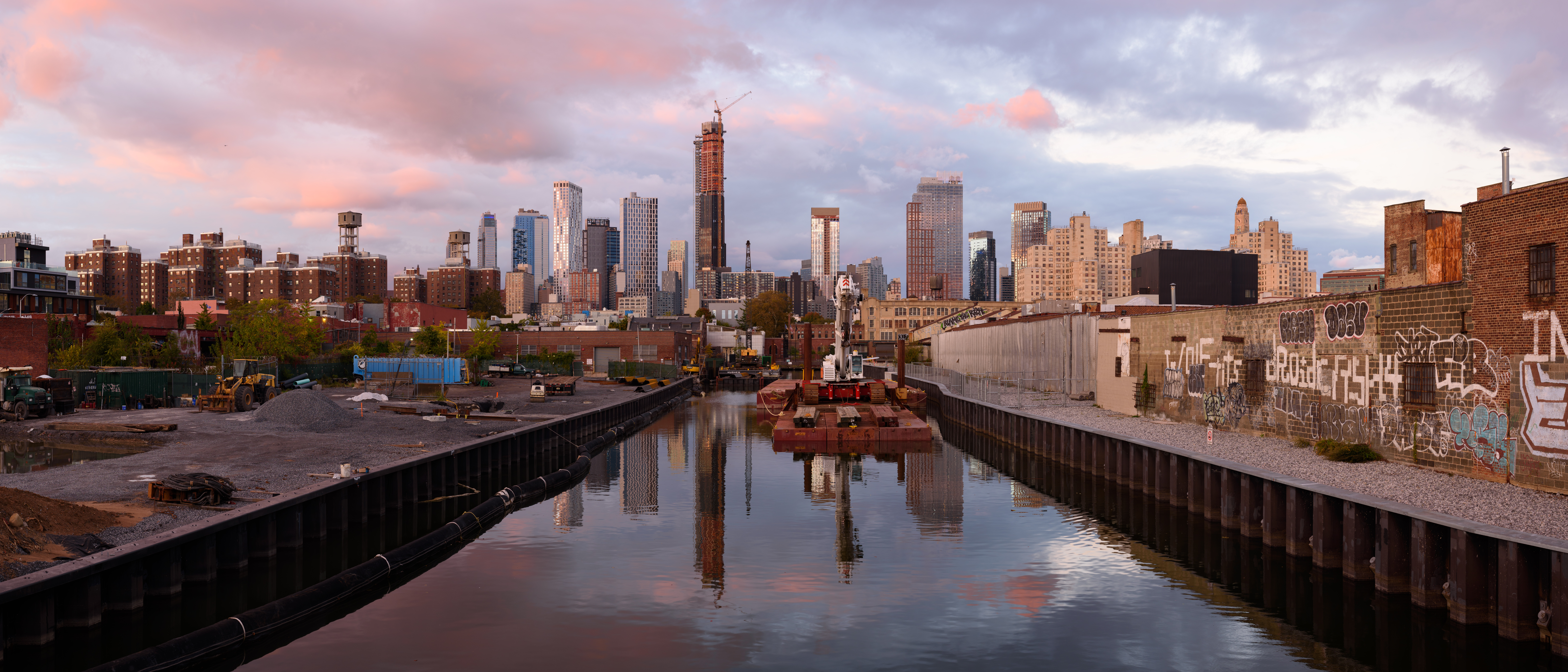
View of the Brooklyn skyline from the Gowanus Canal, with the Brooklyn Tower under construction in 2021

== Neighborhoods ==
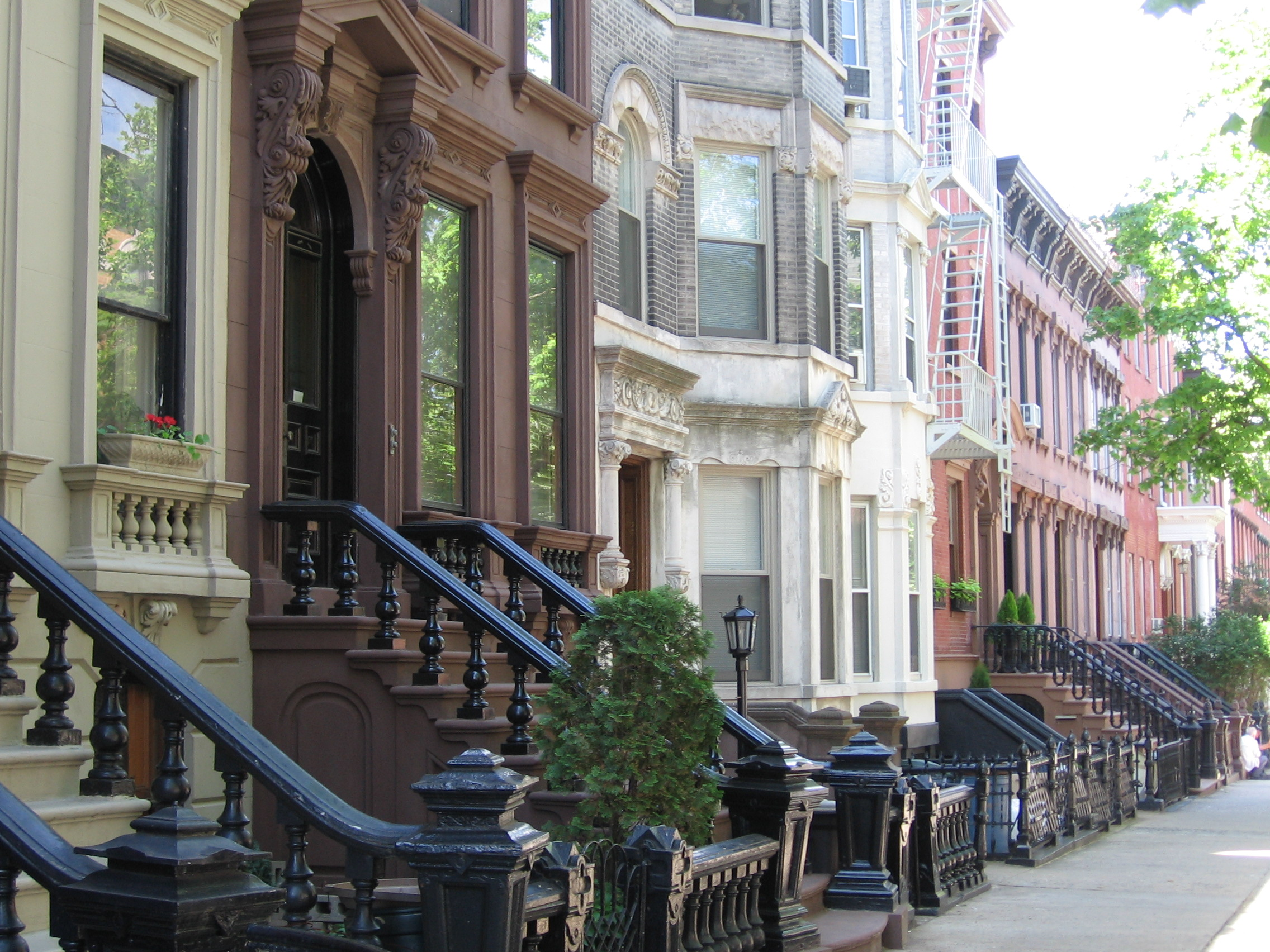
Landmark 19th-century rowhouses on tree-lined Kent Street, in Greenpoint Historic District

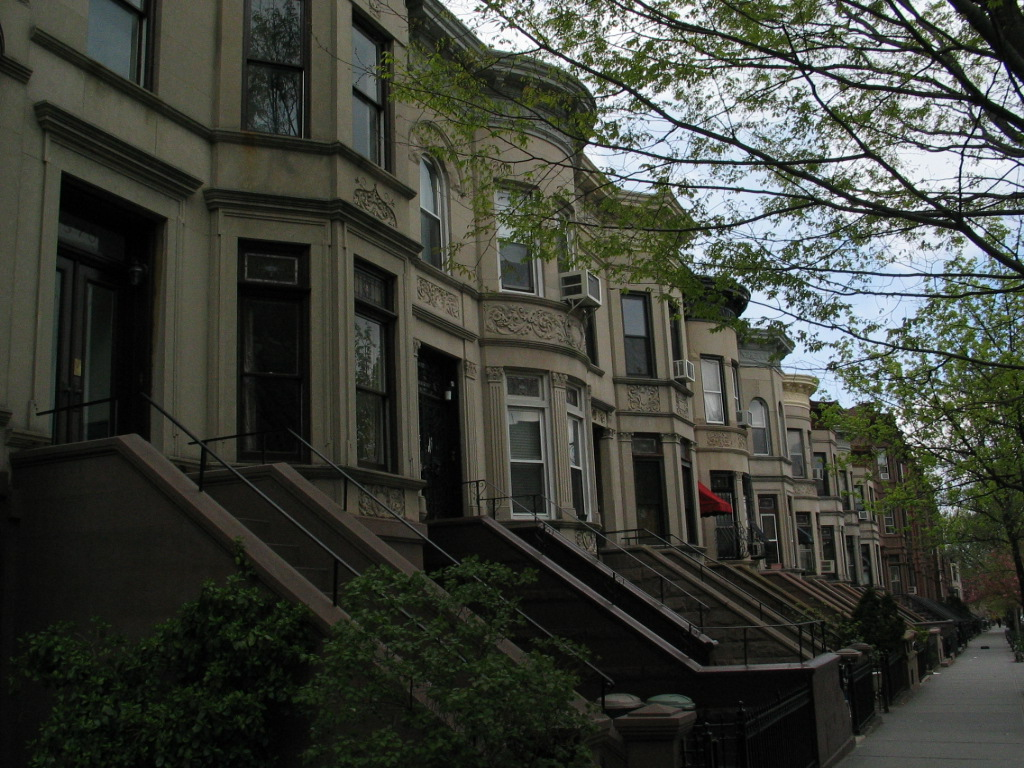
Park Slope

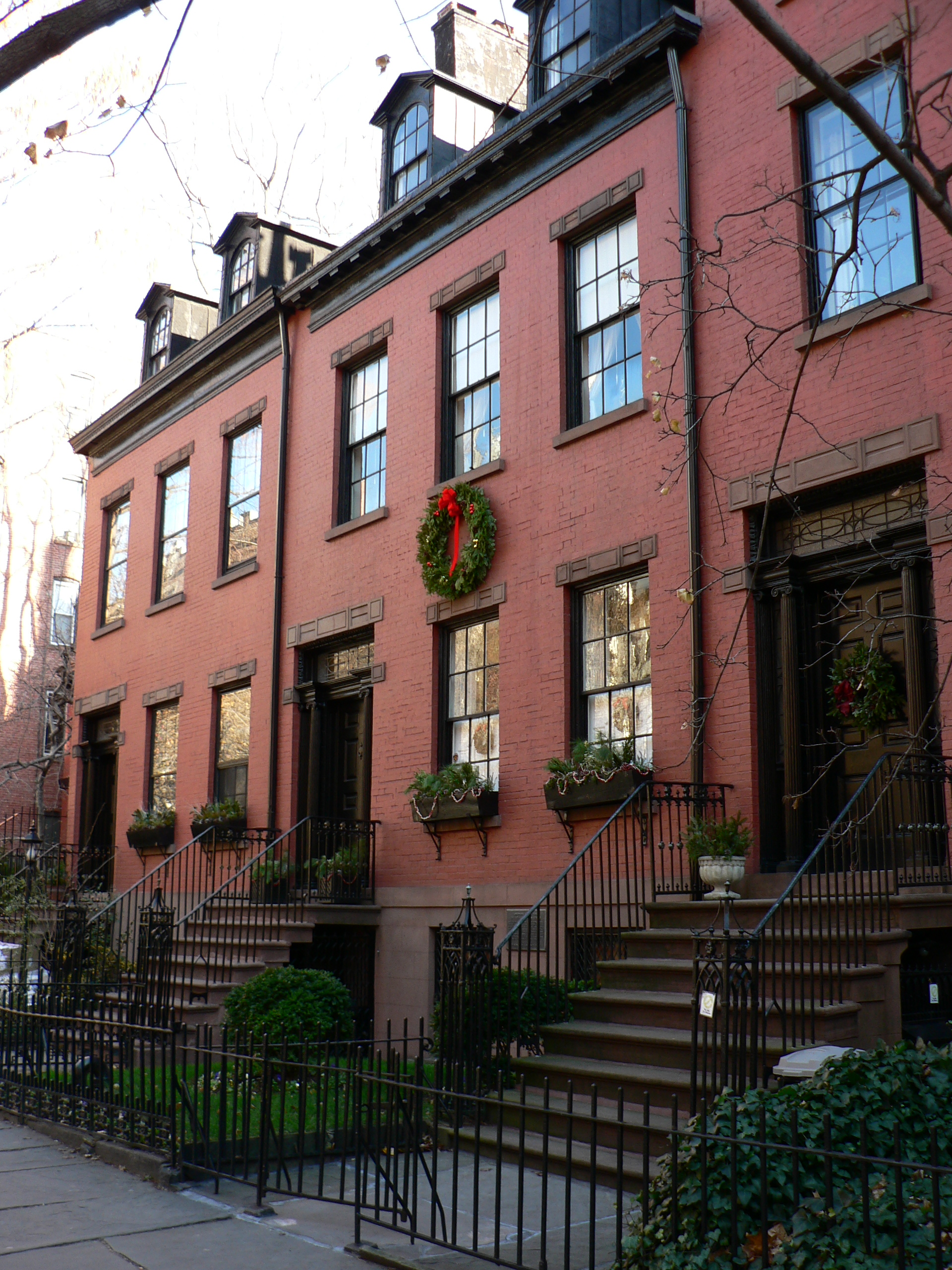
150–159 Willow Street, three original red-brick early 19th-century Federal Style houses in Brooklyn Heights

Brooklyn's neighborhoods are dynamic in ethnic composition. For example, the early to mid-20th century, Brownsville had a majority of Jewish residents; since the 1970s it has been majority African American. Midwood during the early 20th century was filled with ethnic Irish, then filled with Jewish residents for nearly 50 years, and is slowly becoming a Pakistani enclave. Brooklyn's most populous racial group, white, declined from 97.2% in 1930 to 46.9% by 1990.

The borough attracts people previously living in other cities in the United States. Of these, most come from Chicago, Detroit, San Francisco, Washington, D.C., Baltimore, Philadelphia, Boston, Cincinnati, and Seattle.

=== Community diversity ===
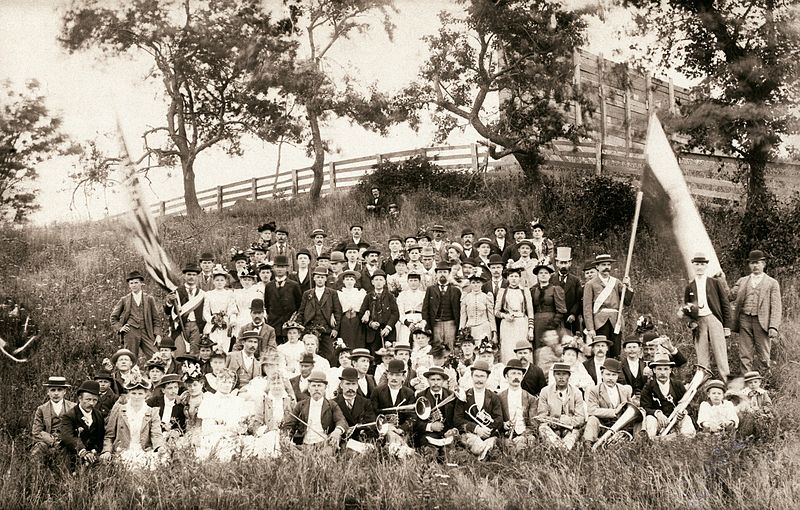
Imatra Society, consisting of Finnish immigrants, celebrating its summer festival in Fort Hamilton, Brooklyn, in 1894

Given New York City's role as a crossroads for immigration from around the world, Brooklyn has evolved a globally cosmopolitan ambiance of its own, demonstrating a robust and growing demographic and cultural diversity with respect to metrics including nationality, religion, race, and domiciliary partnership. In 2010, 51.6% of the population was counted as members of religious congregations. In 2014, there were 914 religious organizations in Brooklyn, the 10th most of all counties in the nation. Brooklyn contains dozens of distinct neighborhoods representing many of the major culturally identified groups found within New York City. Among the most prominent are listed below:

==== Jewish American ====
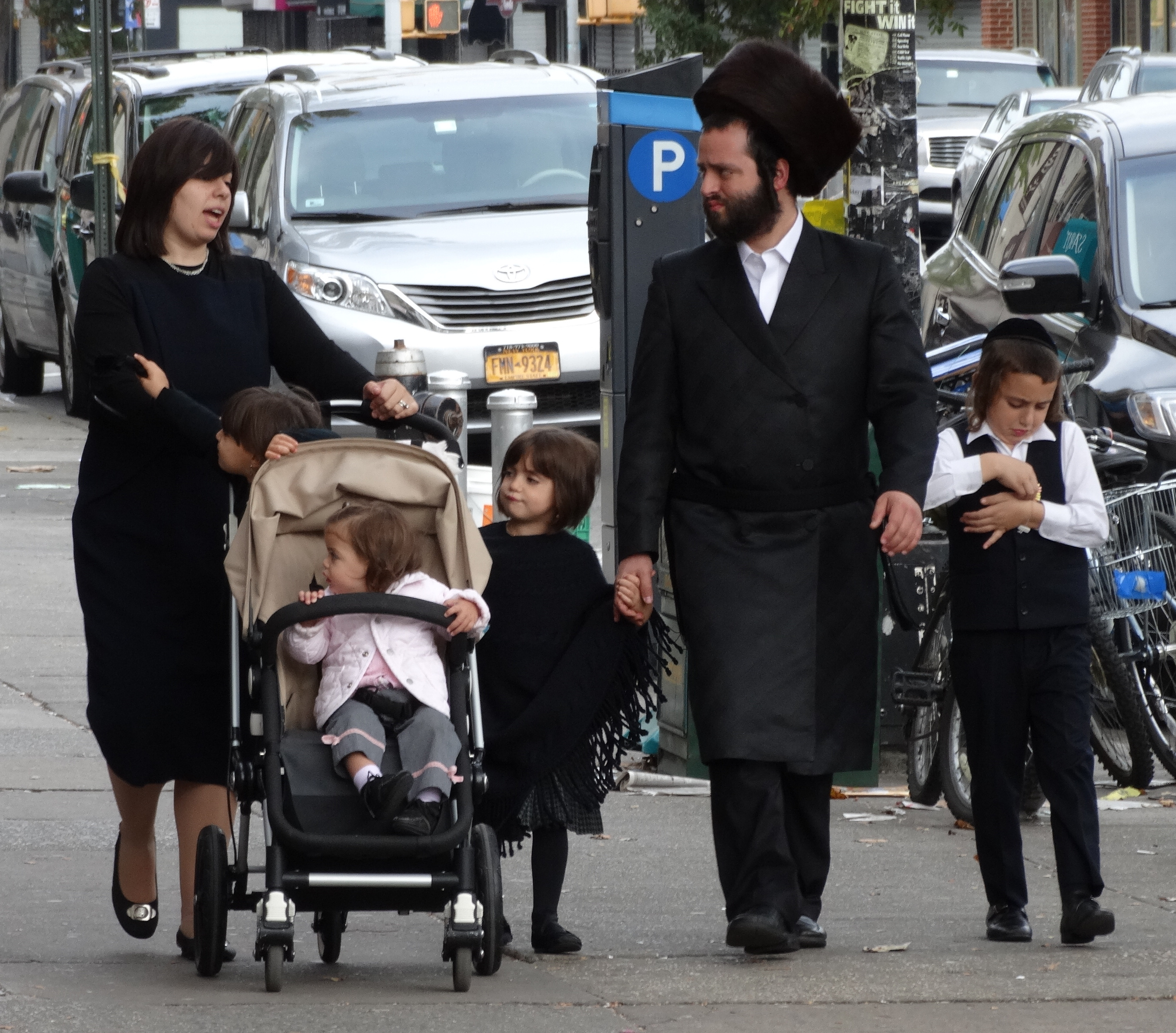
The world's largest metropolitan Hasidic Jewish community resides in Brooklyn.

Over 600,000 Jews, particularly Orthodox and Hasidic Jews, have become concentrated in such historically Jewish areas as Borough Park, Williamsburg, and Midwood, where there are many yeshivas, synagogues, and kosher restaurants, as well as a variety of Jewish businesses. Adjacent to Borough Park, the Kensington area housed a significant population of Conservative Jews (under the aegis of such nationally prominent midcentury rabbis as Jacob Bosniak and Abraham Heller) when it was still considered to be a subsection of Flatbush; many of their defunct facilities have been repurposed to serve extensions of the Borough Park Hasidic community. Other notable religious Jewish neighborhoods with a longstanding cultural lineage include Canarsie, Sea Gate, and Crown Heights, home to the Chabad world headquarters. Neighborhoods with largely defunct yet historically notable Jewish populations include central Flatbush, East Flatbush, Brownsville, East New York, Bensonhurst and Sheepshead Bay (particularly its Madison subsection). Many hospitals in Brooklyn were started by Jewish charities, including Maimonides Medical Center in Borough Park and Brookdale Hospital in East Flatbush.

According to the American Jewish Population Project in 2020, Brooklyn was home to over 480,000 Jews. In 2023, the UJA-Federation of New York estimated that Brooklyn is home to 462,000 Jews, a large decrease compared to the 561,000 estimated in 2011.

The predominantly Jewish, Crown Heights (and later East Flatbush)-based Madison Democratic Club served as the borough's primary "clubhouse" political venue for decades until the ascendancy of Meade Esposito's rival, Canarsie-based Thomas Jefferson Democratic Club in the 1960s and 1970s, playing an integral role in the rise of such figures as Speaker of the New York State Assembly Irwin Steingut; his son, fellow Speaker Stanley Steingut; New York City Mayor Abraham Beame; real estate developer Fred Trump; Democratic district leader Beadie Markowitz; and political fixer Abraham "Bunny" Lindenbaum.

Many non-Orthodox Jews (ranging from observant members of various denominations to atheists of Jewish cultural heritage) are concentrated in Ditmas Park and Park Slope, with smaller observant and culturally Jewish populations in Brooklyn Heights, Cobble Hill, Brighton Beach, and Coney Island.

==== Chinese American ====
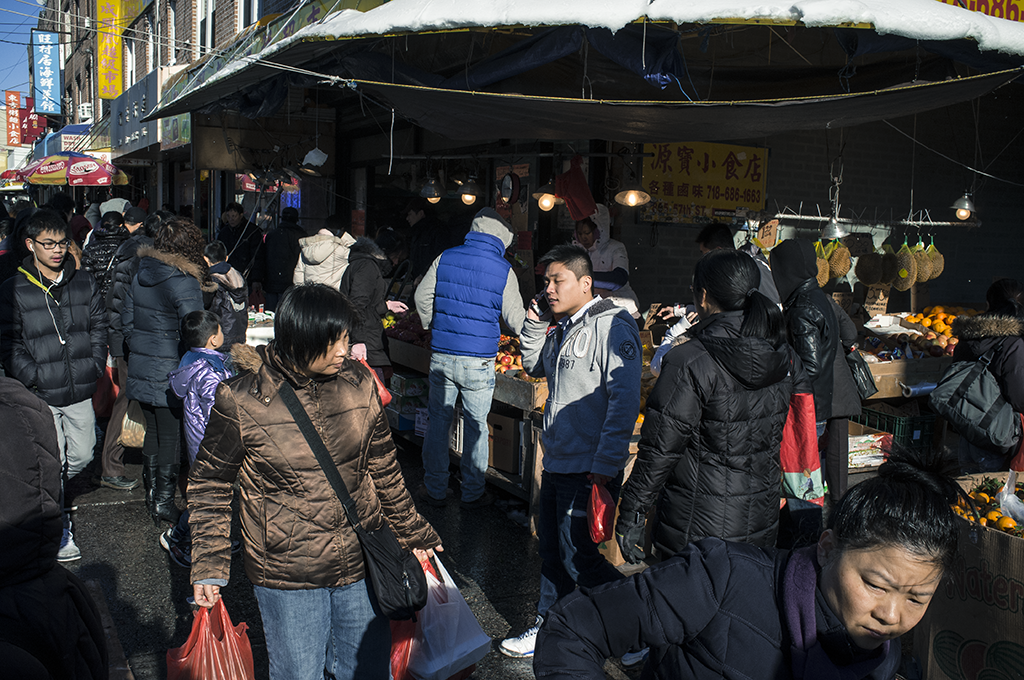
8th Avenue in Brooklyn's Sunset Park Chinatown

Over 200,000 Chinese Americans live throughout the southern parts of Brooklyn, primarily concentrated in Sunset Park, Bensonhurst, Gravesend, and Homecrest. Brooklyn is the borough that is home to the highest number of Chinatowns in New York City. The largest concentration is in Sunset Park along 8th Avenue, which has become known for its Chinese culture since the opening of the now-defunct Winley Supermarket in 1986 spurred widespread settlement in the area. It is called "Brooklyn's Chinatown" and originally it was a small Chinese enclave with Cantonese speakers being the main Chinese population during the late 1980s and 1990s, but since the 2000s, the Chinese population in the area dramatically shifted to majority Fuzhounese Americans, which contributed immensely to expanding this Chinatown, and bestowing the nicknames "Fuzhou Town (福州埠), Brooklyn" or the "Little Fuzhou (小福州)" of Brooklyn. Many Chinese restaurants can be found throughout Sunset Park, and the area hosts a popular Chinese New Year celebration. Since the 2000s going forward, the growing concentration of the Cantonese speaking population in Brooklyn have dramatically shifted to Bensonhurst/Gravesend and Homecrest creating newer Chinatowns of Brooklyn and these newer Brooklyn Chinatowns are known as "Brooklyn's Little Hong Kong/Guangdong" due to their Chinese populations being overwhelmingly Cantonese populated.

==== African American and Caribbean American ====
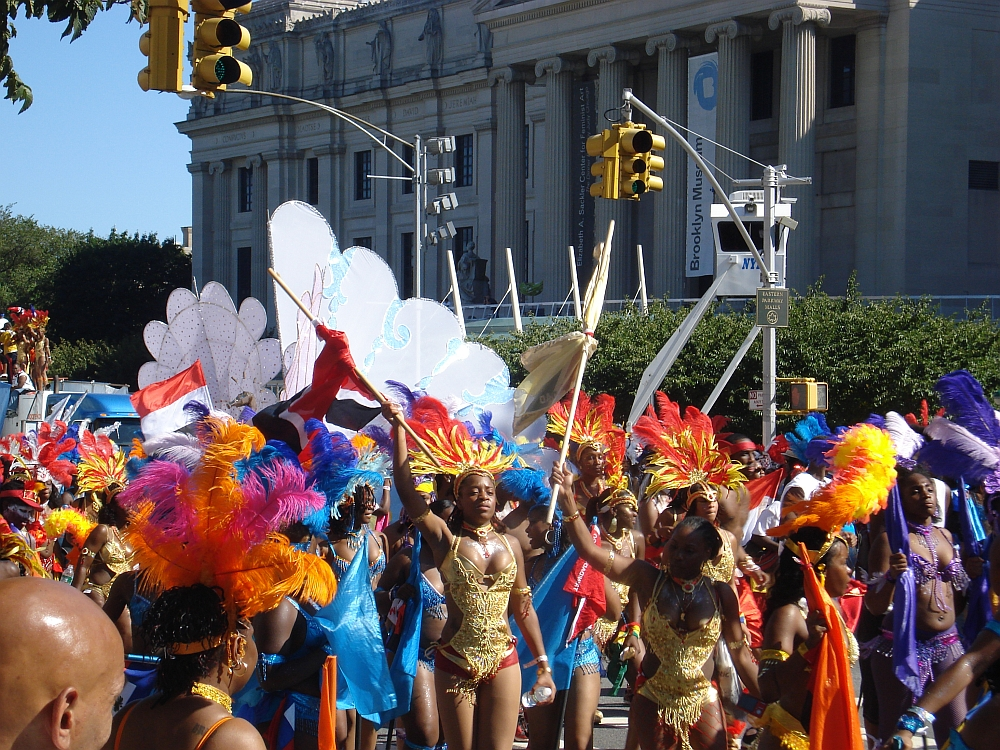
The West Indian Day Parade marching by the Brooklyn Museum

Brooklyn's African American and Caribbean communities are spread throughout much of Brooklyn. Brooklyn's West Indian community is concentrated in the Crown Heights, Flatbush, East Flatbush, Kensington, and Canarsie neighborhoods in central Brooklyn. Brooklyn is home to the largest community of West Indians outside of the Caribbean. Although the largest West Indian groups in Brooklyn are Jamaicans, Guyanese and Haitians, there are West Indian immigrants from nearly every part of the Caribbean. Crown Heights and Flatbush are home to many of Brooklyn's West Indian restaurants and bakeries. Brooklyn has an annual, celebrated Carnival in the tradition of pre-Lenten celebrations in the islands. Started by natives of Trinidad and Tobago, the West Indian Labor Day Parade takes place every Labor Day on Eastern Parkway. The Brooklyn Academy of Music also holds the DanceAfrica festival in late May, featuring street vendors and dance performances showcasing food and culture from all parts of Africa. Since the opening of the IND Fulton Street Line in 1936, Bedford-Stuyvesant has been home to one of the most famous African American communities in the United States. Working-class communities remain prevalent in Brownsville, East New York and Coney Island, while remnants of similar communities in Prospect Heights, Fort Greene and Clinton Hill have endured amid widespread gentrification.

==== Hispanic American ====
In the aftermath of World War II and subsequent urban renewal initiatives that decimated longtime Manhattan enclaves (most notably on the Upper West Side), Puerto Rican migrants began to settle in such waterfront industrial neighborhoods as Sunset Park, Red Hook and Gowanus, near the shipyards and factories where they worked. The borough's Hispanic population diversified after the 1965 Hart-Cellar Act loosened restrictions on immigration from elsewhere in Latin America.

Bushwick has since emerged as the largest hub of Brooklyn's Hispanic American community. Like other Hispanic neighborhoods in New York City, Bushwick has an established Puerto Rican presence, along with an influx of many Dominicans, South Americans, Central Americans and Mexicans. As nearly 80% of Bushwick's population is Hispanic, its residents have created many businesses to support their various national and distinct traditions in food and other items. Sunset Park's population is 42% Hispanic, made up of these various ethnic groups. Brooklyn's main Hispanic groups are Puerto Ricans, Mexicans, Dominicans and Ecuadorians; they are spread out throughout the borough. Puerto Ricans and Dominicans are predominant in Bushwick, Williamsburg's South Side and East New York. Mexicans (especially from the state of Puebla) now predominate alongside Chinese immigrants in Sunset Park, although remnants of the neighborhood's once-substantial postwar Puerto Rican and Dominican communities continue to reside below 39th Street. Save for Red Hook (which remained roughly one-fifth Hispanic American as of the 2010 Census), the South Side and Sunset Park, similar postwar communities in other waterfront neighborhoods—including western Park Slope, the north end of Greenpoint, and Boerum Hill, long considered the northern subsection of Gowanus—largely disappeared by the turn of the century due to various factors, including deindustrialization, ensuing gentrification and suburbanization among more affluent Dominicans and Puerto Ricans. A Panamanian enclave exists in Crown Heights.

==== Russian and Ukrainian American ====
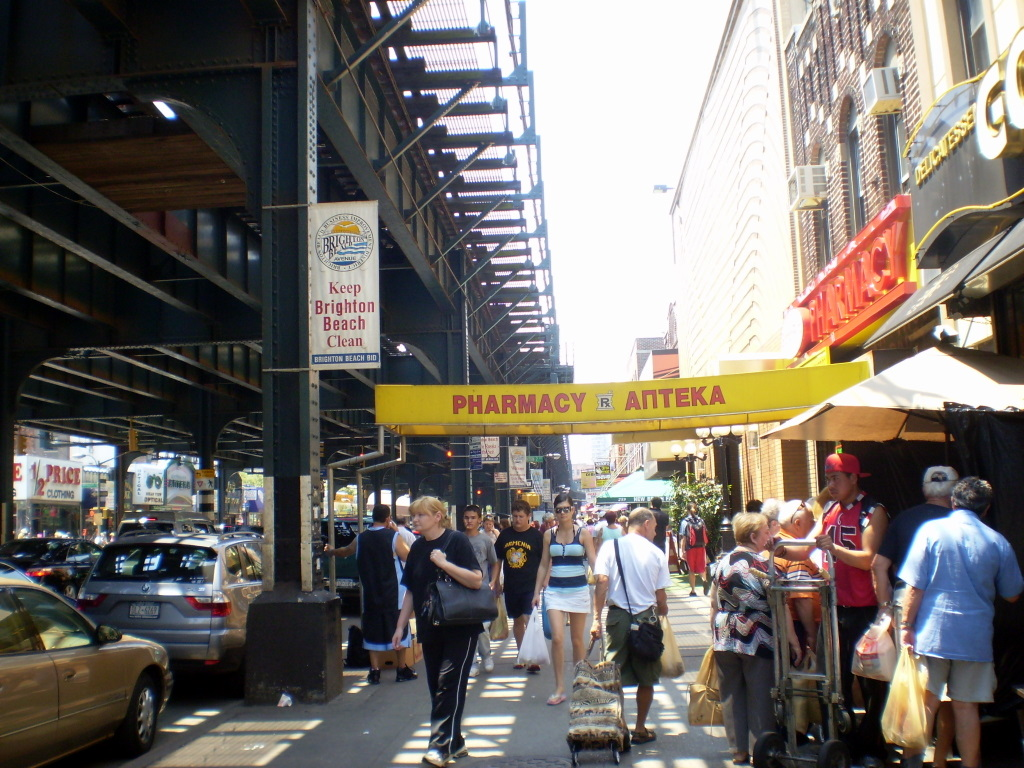
"Little Russia" or "Little Odessa" in Brighton Beach

Brooklyn is also home to many Russians and Ukrainians, who are mainly concentrated in the areas of Brighton Beach and Sheepshead Bay. Brighton Beach features many Russian and Ukrainian businesses and has been nicknamed Little Russia and Little Odessa, respectively. In the 1970s, Soviet Jews won the right to immigrate, and many ended up in Brighton Beach. In recent years, the non-Jewish Russian and Ukrainian communities of Brighton Beach have grown, and the area is now home to a diverse collection of immigrants from across the former USSR. Smaller concentrations of Russian and Ukrainian Americans are scattered elsewhere in south Brooklyn, including Bay Ridge, Bensonhurst, Homecrest, Coney Island, and Mill Basin. A growing community of Uzbek Americans have settled alongside them in recent years due to their ability to speak Russian.

==== Polish American ====
Brooklyn's Polish inhabitants are historically concentrated in Greenpoint, home to Little Poland. Other longstanding settlements in Borough Park and Sunset Park have endured, while more recent immigrants are scattered throughout the southern parts of Brooklyn alongside the Russian and Ukrainian American communities.

==== Italian American ====
Despite widespread migration to Staten Island and more suburban areas in metropolitan New York throughout the postwar era, notable concentrations of Italian Americans continue to reside in the neighborhoods of Bensonhurst, Dyker Heights, Bay Ridge, Bath Beach and Gravesend. Less perceptible remnants of older communities have persisted in Cobble Hill and Carroll Gardens, where the homes of the remaining Italian Americans can often be contrasted with more recent upper middle class residents through the display of small Madonna statues, the retention of plastic-metal stoop awnings and the use of Formstone in house cladding. All of the aforementioned neighborhoods have retained Italian restaurants, bakeries, delicatessens, pizzerias, cafes and social clubs.

==== Arab American and Muslim ====
In the early 20th century, many Lebanese and Syrian Christians settled around Atlantic Avenue west of Flatbush Avenue in Boerum Hill; more recently, this area has evolved into a Yemeni commercial district. More recent, predominantly Muslim Arab immigrants, especially Egyptians and Lebanese, have moved into the southwest portion of Brooklyn, particularly to Bay Ridge, where many Middle Eastern restaurants, hookah lounges, halal grocers, Islamic shops and mosques line the commercial thoroughfares of Fifth and Third Avenues below 86th Street. Brighton Beach is home to a growing Pakistani American community, while Midwood is home to Little Pakistan along Coney Island Avenue (recently co-named Muhammad Ali Jinnah Way). Pakistani Independence Day is celebrated every year with parades and parties on Coney Island Avenue. Just to the north, Kensington is one of New York's several emerging Bangladeshi enclaves.

==== Irish American ====
Third-, fourth- and fifth-generation Irish Americans can be found throughout Brooklyn, with moderate concentrations enduring in the neighborhoods of Windsor Terrace, Park Slope, Bay Ridge, Marine Park and Gerritsen Beach. Historical communities also existed in Vinegar Hill and other waterfront industrial neighborhoods, such as Greenpoint and Sunset Park. Paralleling the Italian American community, many moved to Staten Island and suburban areas in the postwar era. Those that stayed engendered close-knit, stable working-to-middle class communities through employment in the civil service (especially in law enforcement, transportation, and the New York City Fire Department) and the building and construction trades, while others were subsumed by the professional-managerial class and largely shed the Irish American community's distinct cultural traditions (including continued worship in the Catholic Church and other social activities, such as Irish stepdance and frequenting Irish American bars).

==== South Asian American ====
While not as extensive as the Indian American population in Queens, younger professionals of Asian Indian origin are finding Brooklyn to be a convenient alternative to Manhattan to find housing. According to the 2020 Census, nearly 40,000 Indian Americans call Brooklyn home.

Brighton Beach is home to a growing Pakistani American community, while Midwood is home to Little Pakistan along Coney Island Avenue recently renamed Muhammad Ali Jinnah way. Pakistan Independence Day is celebrated every year with parades and parties on Coney Island Avenue. Just to the north, Kensington is one of New York's several emerging Bangladeshi enclaves.

==== Greek American ====
Brooklyn's Greek Americans live throughout the borough. A historical concentration has endured in Bay Ridge and adjacent areas, where there is a noticeable cluster of Hellenic-focused schools, businesses and cultural institutions. Other businesses are situated in Downtown Brooklyn near Atlantic Avenue. As in much of the New York metropolitan area, Greek-owned diners are found throughout the borough.

==== LGBTQ community ====
Brooklyn is home to a large and growing number of same-sex couples. Same-sex marriages in New York were legalized on June 24, 2011, and were authorized to take place beginning 30 days thereafter. The Park Slope neighborhood spearheaded the popularity of Brooklyn among lesbians, and Prospect Heights has an LGBT residential presence. Numerous neighborhoods have since become home to LGBT communities. Brooklyn Liberation March, the largest transgender-rights demonstration in LGBTQ history, took place on June 14, 2020, stretching from Grand Army Plaza to Fort Greene, focused on supporting Black transgender lives, drawing an estimated 15,000 to 20,000 participants.

==== Artists-in-residence ====
Brooklyn became a preferred site for artists and hipsters to set up live/work spaces after being priced out of the same types of living arrangements in Manhattan. Various neighborhoods in Brooklyn, including Williamsburg, DUMBO, Red Hook, and Park Slope evolved as popular neighborhoods for artists-in-residence. However, rents and costs of living have since increased dramatically in these same neighborhoods, forcing artists to move to somewhat less expensive neighborhoods in Brooklyn or across Upper New York Bay to locales in New Jersey, such as Jersey City or Hoboken.

== Demographics ==
Historical population
Year	Pop.	±%
1731	2,150	—
1756	2,707	+25.9%
1771	3,623	+33.8%
1786	3,966	+9.5%
1790	4,549	+14.7%
1800	5,740	+26.2%
1810	8,303	+44.7%
1820	11,187	+34.7%
1830	20,535	+83.6%
1840	47,613	+131.9%
1850	138,882	+191.7%
1860	279,122	+101.0%
1870	419,921	+50.4%
1880	599,495	+42.8%
1890	838,547	+39.9%
1900	1,166,582	+39.1%
1910	1,634,351	+40.1%
1920	2,018,356	+23.5%
1930	2,560,401	+26.9%
1940	2,698,285	+5.4%
1950	2,738,175	+1.5%
1960	2,627,319	−4.0%
1970	2,602,012	−1.0%
1980	2,230,936	−14.3%
1990	2,300,664	+3.1%
2000	2,465,326	+7.2%
2010	2,504,700	+1.6%
2020	2,736,074	+9.2%
2025	2,653,963	−3.0%
1731–1786; U.S. Decennial Census; 1790–1960 1900–1990; 1990–2000 2020 and 2025

New York City's five boroughs
Jurisdiction		Population	Land area		Density of population		GDP
Borough	County	Census (2020)	square miles	square km	people/ sq. mile	people/ sq. km	billions (US$, 2024) ^{2}
The Bronx	Bronx	1,472,654	42.2	109.2	34,920	13,482	58.323
Brooklyn	Kings	2,736,074	69.4	179.7	39,438	15,227	145.934
Manhattan	New York	1,694,251	22.7	58.7	74,781	28,872	1,006.673
Queens	Queens	2,405,464	108.7	281.6	22,125	8,542	143.131
Staten Island	Richmond	495,747	57.5	149.0	8,618	3,327	23.779
City of New York		8,804,190	300.5	778.2	29,303	11,314	1,354.061
State of New York		20,201,249	47,123.6	122,049.5	429	166	2,297.028
Sources: and see individual borough articles.

Racial composition	2020	2010	1990	1950	1900
White	37.6%	42.8%	46.9%	92.2%	98.3%
—Non-Hispanic	35.4%	35.7%	40.1%	n/a	n/a
Black or African American	26.7%	34.3%	37.9%	7.6%	1.6%
Hispanic or Latino (of any race)	18.9%	19.8%	20.1%	n/a	n/a
Asian	13.6%	10.5%	4.8%	0.1%	0.1%
Two or more races	8.7%	3.0%	n/a	n/a	n/a

At the 2020 census, 2,736,074 people lived in Brooklyn. The United States Census Bureau had estimated Brooklyn's population increased by 2.2% to 2,559,903 between 2010 and 2019. Brooklyn's estimated population represented 30.7% of New York City's estimated population of 8,336,817; 33.5% of Long Island's population of 7,701,172; and 13.2% of New York State's population of 19,542,209. In 2020, the government of New York City projected Brooklyn's population at 2,648,403. The 2019 census estimates determined there were 958,567 households with an average of 2.66 persons per household. There were 1,065,399 housing units in 2019 and a median gross rent of $1,426. Citing growth, Brooklyn gained 9,696 building permits at the 2019 census estimates program.

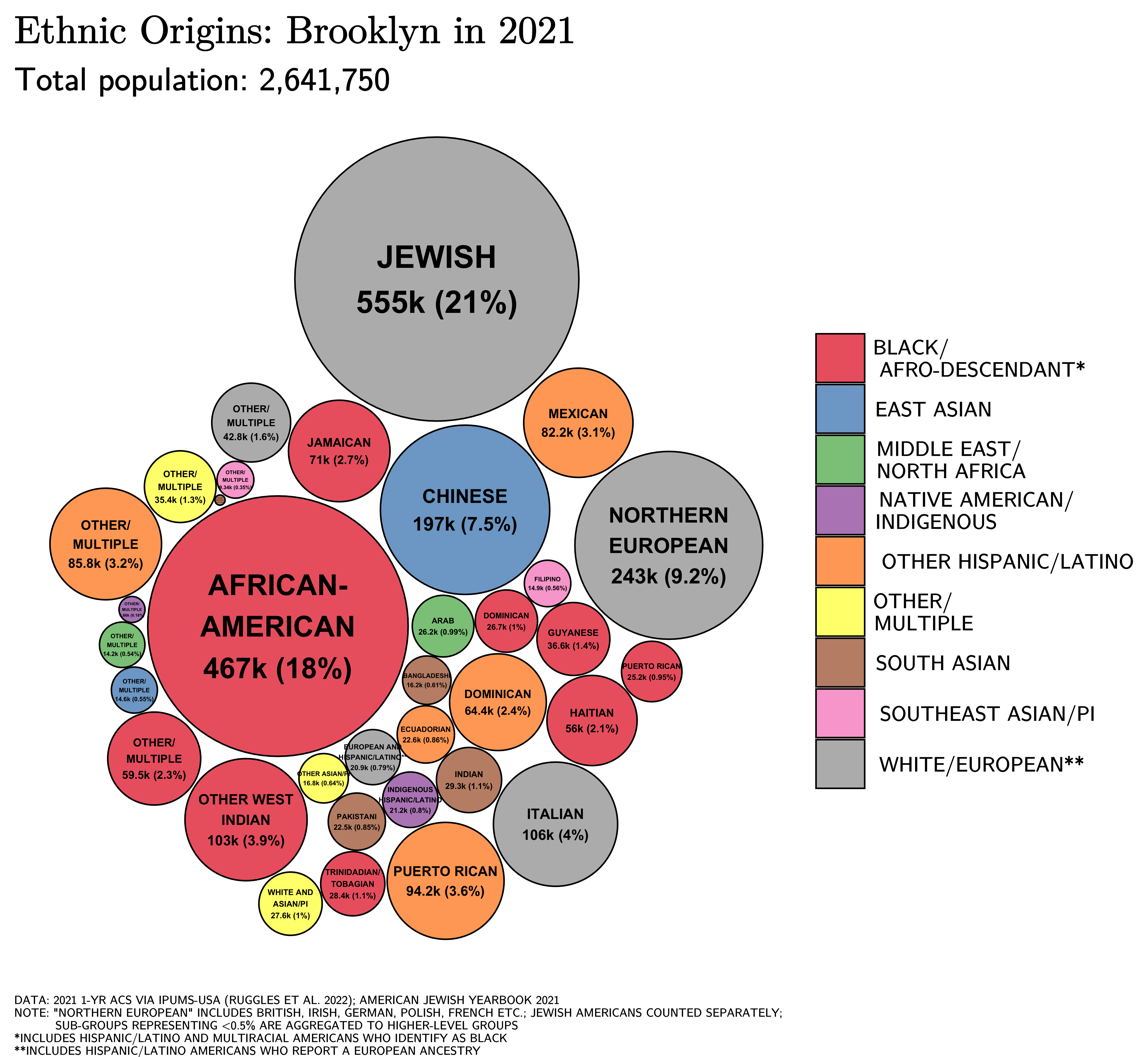
Ethnic origins in Brooklyn

=== Ethnic groups ===
Ancestry in Brooklyn Borough (2014–2018)
Origin	percent
African American (Does not include West Indian or African)	16.4%
West Indian American (Except Hispanic Groups)	11.5%
East Asian American (Includes Chinese, Japanese, Vietnamese, etc.)	8.4%
English American (*Includes "American" ancestry)	7.6%
Puerto Rican American	5.7%
Italian American	4.8%
Russian and Eastern European (Includes Russian, Ukrainian, Soviet, etc.)	4.3%
Central European (Includes Slovak, Slovenian, Polish, Czech, etc.)	4.2%
Mexican American	4.1%
Irish American	3.8%
Dominican American	3.5%
German American	2.8%
South Asian American	2.4%
South American (Includes Peruvian, Ecuadorian, Argentinian, etc.)	2.3%
	2%
Central American (Includes Honduran, Salvadoran, Costa Rican, etc.)	1.9%
Other (Note: Mostly Multiracial American, other Asian or other European ancestry)	14.7%

The 2020 American Community Survey estimated the racial and ethnic makeup of Brooklyn was 35.4% non-Hispanic white, 26.7% Black or African American, 0.9% American Indian or Alaska Native, 13.6% Asian, 0.1% Native Hawaiian and other Pacific Islander, 4.1% two or more races, and 18.9% Hispanic or Latin American of any race. According to the 2020 United States census, Brooklyn's population was (inclusive of "in combination with one or more other races") 43.3% White, including 35.4% non-Hispanic White; 31.9% Black, including 26.7% non-Hispanic black; 15.3% Asian; 1.6% Native American; 0.2% Pacific Islander; 8.7% "Two or More Races"; and 16.9% from other races. Hispanics and Latinos made up 18.9% of Brooklyn's population. In 2010, Brooklyn had some neighborhoods segregated based on race, ethnicity, and religion. Overall, the southwest half of Brooklyn is racially mixed although it contains few black residents; the northeast section is mostly black and Hispanic/Latino.

=== Languages ===
Brooklyn has a high degree of linguistic diversity. As of 2010, 54.1% (1,240,416) of Brooklyn residents ages 5 and older spoke only English at home, while 17.2% (393,340) spoke Spanish, 6.5% (148,012) Chinese, 5.3% (121,607) Russian, 3.5% (79,469) Yiddish, 2.8% (63,019) French Creole, 1.4% (31,004) Italian, 1.2% (27,440) Hebrew, 1.0% (23,207) Polish, 1.0% (22,763) French, 1.0% (21,773) Arabic, 0.9% (19,388) various Indic languages, 0.7% (15,936) Urdu, and African languages were spoken at home by 0.5% (12,305) of the population over the age of five. In total, 45.9% (1,051,456) of Brooklyn's population ages 5 and older spoke a home language other than English.

== Culture ==
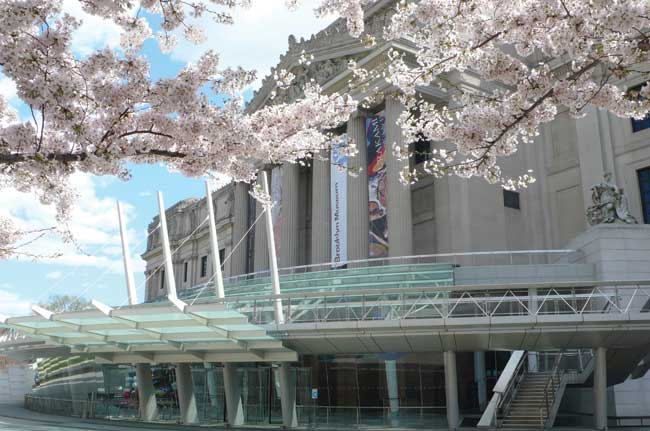
The Brooklyn Museum on Eastern Parkway

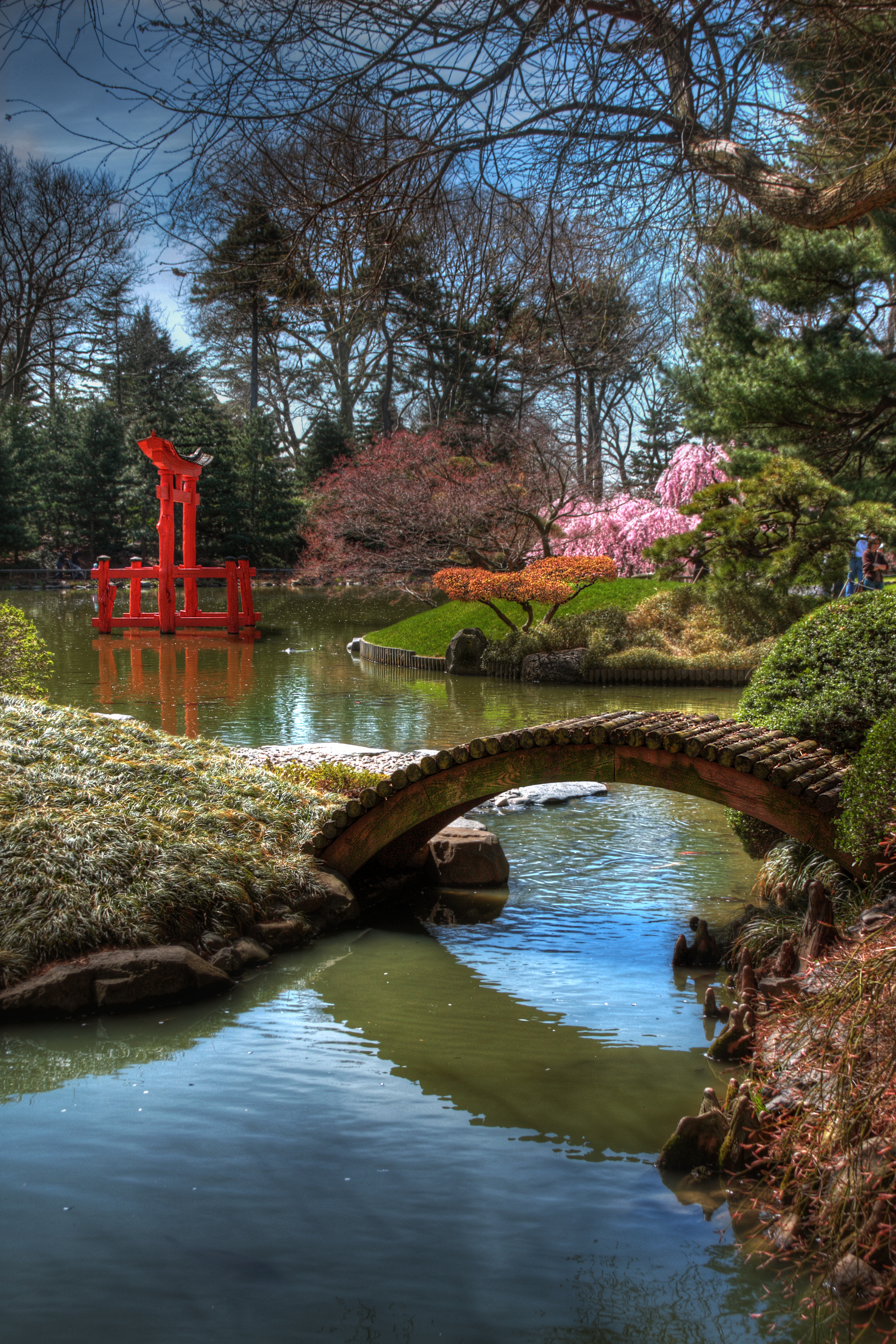
Brooklyn Botanic Garden

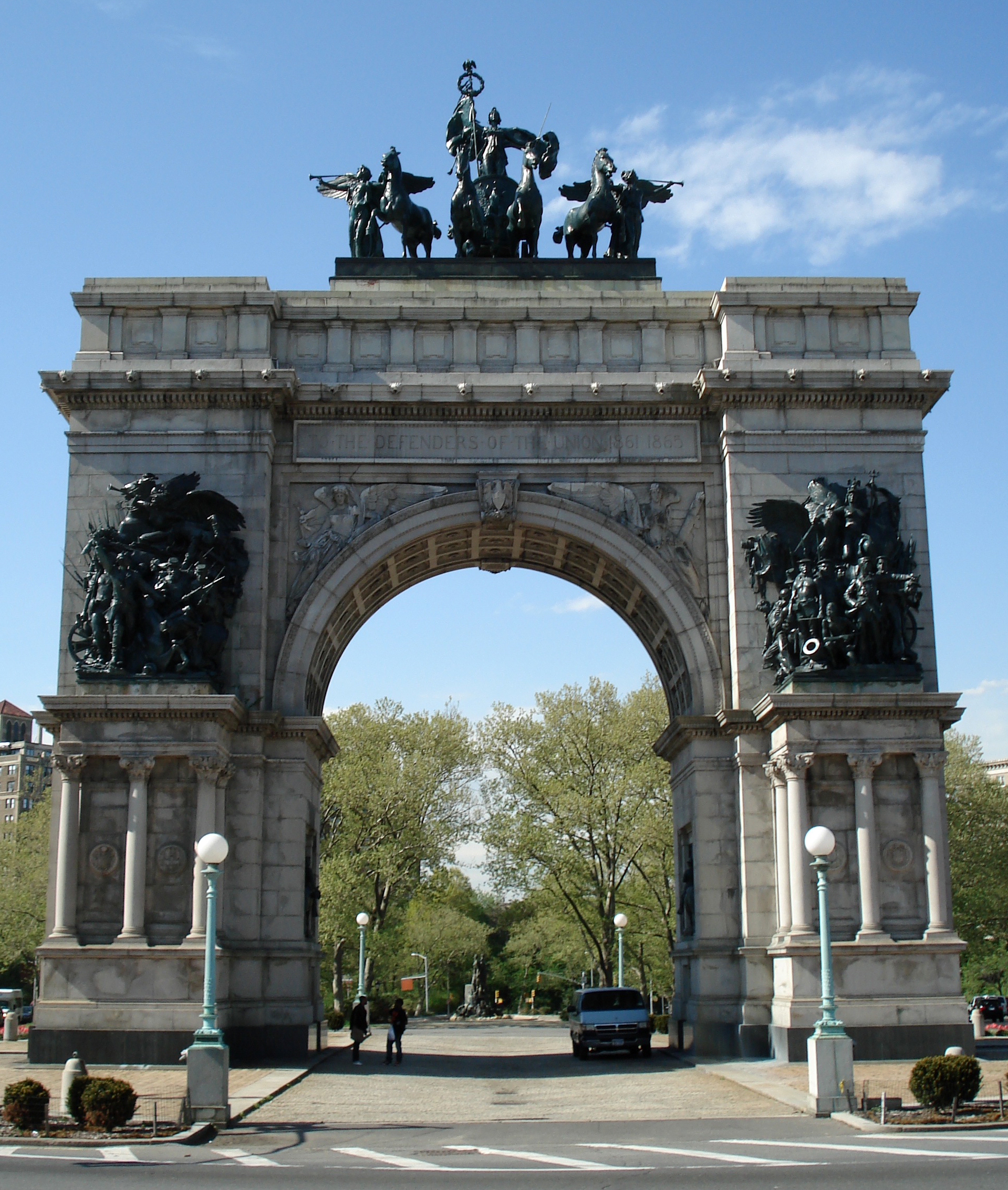
The Soldiers' and Sailors' Arch at Grand Army Plaza

Brooklyn has played a major role in various aspects of American culture, including literature, cinema, and theater. Brooklyn's accent has often been portrayed as the "typical New Yorker accent" in American media, although this accent and its stereotypes are supposedly diminishing in currency. Brooklyn's official colors are blue and gold.

=== Cultural venues ===
Brooklyn hosts the world-renowned Brooklyn Academy of Music, the Brooklyn Philharmonic, and the second-largest public art collection in the United States, housed in the Brooklyn Museum.

The Brooklyn Museum, opened in 1897, is New York City's second-largest public art museum. It has in its permanent collection more than 1.5 million objects, from ancient Egyptian masterpieces to contemporary art. The Brooklyn Children's Museum, the world's first museum dedicated to children, opened in December 1899. The only such New York State institution accredited by the American Alliance of Museums, it is one of the few globally to have a permanent collection – over 30,000 cultural objects and natural history specimens.

The Brooklyn Academy of Music (BAM) includes a 2,109-seat opera house, an 874-seat theater, and the art-house BAM Rose Cinemas. Bargemusic and St. Ann's Warehouse are on the other side of Downtown Brooklyn in the DUMBO arts district. Brooklyn Technical High School has the second-largest auditorium in New York City (after Radio City Music Hall), with a seating capacity of over 3,000.

=== Media ===
==== Local periodicals ====
Brooklyn has several local newspapers: The Brooklyn Daily Eagle, Bay Currents (Oceanfront Brooklyn), Brooklyn View, The Brooklyn Paper, and Courier-Life Publications. Courier-Life Publications, owned by Rupert Murdoch's News Corporation, is Brooklyn's largest chain of newspapers. Brooklyn is also served by the major New York dailies, including The New York Times, the New York Daily News, and the New York Post. Several others are now defunct, including the Brooklyn Union (1867–1937), and the Brooklyn Times.

The borough is home to the arts and politics monthly Brooklyn Rail, as well as the arts and cultural quarterly Cabinet. Hello Mr. is also published in Brooklyn.

Brooklyn Magazine is one of the few glossy magazines about Brooklyn. Several others are now defunct, including BKLYN Magazine (a bimonthly lifestyle book owned by Joseph McCarthy, that saw itself as a vehicle for high-end advertisers in Manhattan and was mailed to 80,000 high-income households), Brooklyn Bridge Magazine, The Brooklynite (a free, glossy quarterly edited by Daniel Treiman), and NRG (edited by Gail Johnson and originally marketed as a local periodical for Clinton Hill and Fort Greene, but expanded in scope to become the self-proclaimed "Pulse of Brooklyn" and then the "Pulse of New York").

==== Ethnic press ====
Brooklyn has a thriving ethnic press. El Diario La Prensa, the largest and oldest Spanish-language daily newspaper in the United States, maintains its corporate headquarters at 1 MetroTech Center in Downtown Brooklyn. Major ethnic publications include the Brooklyn–Queens Catholic paper The Tablet, Hamodia, an Orthodox Jewish daily, and The Jewish Press, an Orthodox Jewish weekly. Many nationally distributed ethnic newspapers are based in Brooklyn. Over 60 ethnic groups, writing in 42 languages, publish some 300 non-English language magazines and newspapers in New York City. Among them is the quarterly L'Idea, a bilingual magazine printed in Italian and English since 1974. In addition, many newspapers published abroad, such as The Daily Gleaner and The Star of Jamaica, are available in Brooklyn. Our Time Press, published weekly by DBG Media, covers the Village of Brooklyn with a motto of "The Local Paper with the Global View".

==== Television ====
The City of New York has an official television station, run by NYC Media, which features programming based in Brooklyn. Brooklyn Community Access Television is the borough's public access channel. Its studios are at the BRIC Arts Media venue, called BRIC House, located on Fulton Street in the Fort Greene section of the borough.

=== Events ===
- The annual Coney Island Mermaid Parade (mid-to-late June) is a costume-and-float parade.
- Coney Island also hosts the annual Nathan's Hot Dog Eating Contest (July 4).
- The annual Labor Day Carnival (also known as the Labor Day Parade or West Indian Day Parade) takes place along Eastern Parkway in Crown Heights.
- The Art of Brooklyn Film Festival runs annually around the second week of June.

== Economy ==
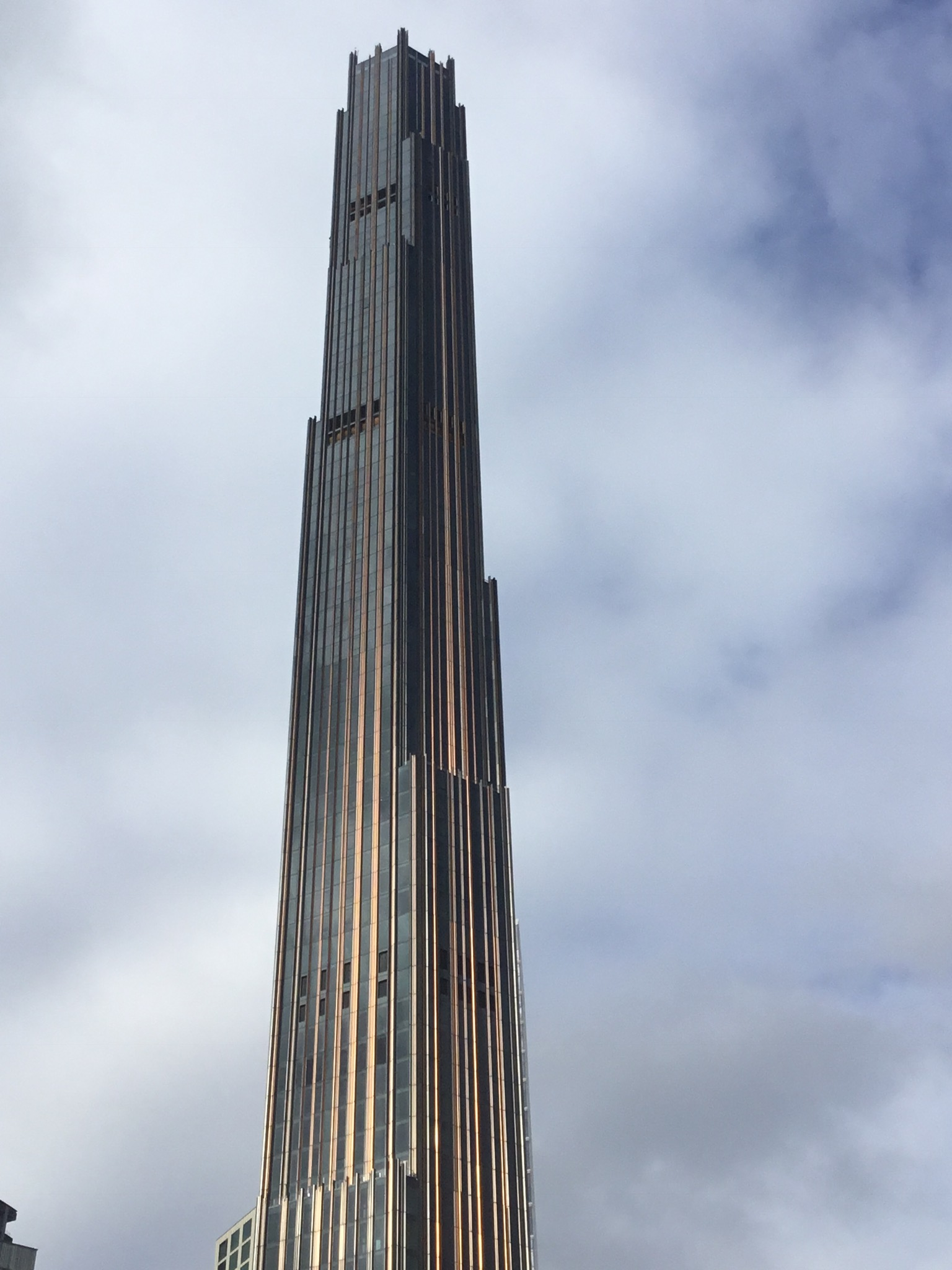
The Brooklyn Tower, the tallest building in Brooklyn and the tallest in New York State outside Manhattan.

Brooklyn's job market is driven by three main factors: the performance of the national and city economy, population flows and the borough's position as a convenient back office for New York's businesses.

Forty-four percent of Brooklyn's employed population, or 410,000 people, work in the borough; more than half of the borough's residents work outside its boundaries. As a result, economic conditions in Manhattan are important to the borough's jobseekers. Strong international immigration to Brooklyn generates jobs in services, retailing and construction.

Since the late 20th century, Brooklyn has benefited from a steady influx of financial back office operations from Manhattan, the rapid growth of a high-tech and entertainment economy in DUMBO, and strong growth in support services such as accounting, personal supply agencies, and computer services firms.

Jobs in the borough were traditionally concentrated in manufacturing, but since 1975, Brooklyn has shifted from a manufacturing-based to a service-based economy. In 2004, 215,000 Brooklyn residents worked in the services sector, while 27,500 worked in manufacturing. Although manufacturing has declined, a substantial base has remained in apparel and niche manufacturing concerns such as furniture, fabricated metals, and food products. The pharmaceutical company Pfizer was founded in Brooklyn in 1869 and had a manufacturing plant in the borough for many years that employed thousands of workers, but the plant shut down in 2008. However, new light-manufacturing concerns in packaging organic and high-end food have sprung up in the old plant.

Established as a shipbuilding facility in 1801, the Brooklyn Navy Yard employed 70,000 people at its peak during World War II and was then the largest employer in the borough. The Missouri, the ship on which the Japanese formally surrendered, was built there, as was the Maine, whose sinking off Havana led to the start of the Spanish–American War. The iron-sided Civil War vessel the Monitor was built in Greenpoint. From 1968 to 1979 Seatrain Shipbuilding was the major employer. Later tenants include industrial design firms, food processing businesses, artisans, and the film and television production industry. About 230 private-sector firms providing 4,000 jobs are at the Yard.

Construction and services are the fastest-growing sectors. Most employers in Brooklyn are small businesses. In 2000, 91% of the approximately 38,704 business establishments in Brooklyn had fewer than 20 employees. As of August 2008, the borough's unemployment rate was 5.9%.

Brooklyn is also home to many banks and credit unions. According to the Federal Deposit Insurance Corporation, there were 37 banks and 26 credit unions operating in the borough in 2010.

The rezoning of Downtown Brooklyn has generated over US$10 billion of private investment and $300 million in public improvements since 2004. Brooklyn is also attracting numerous high technology start-up companies, as Silicon Alley, the metonym for New York City's entrepreneurship ecosystem, has expanded from Lower Manhattan into Brooklyn.

== Parks and other attractions ==
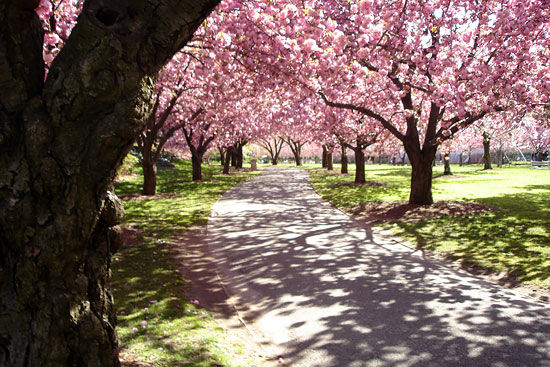
Kwanzan Cherries in bloom at Brooklyn Botanic Garden

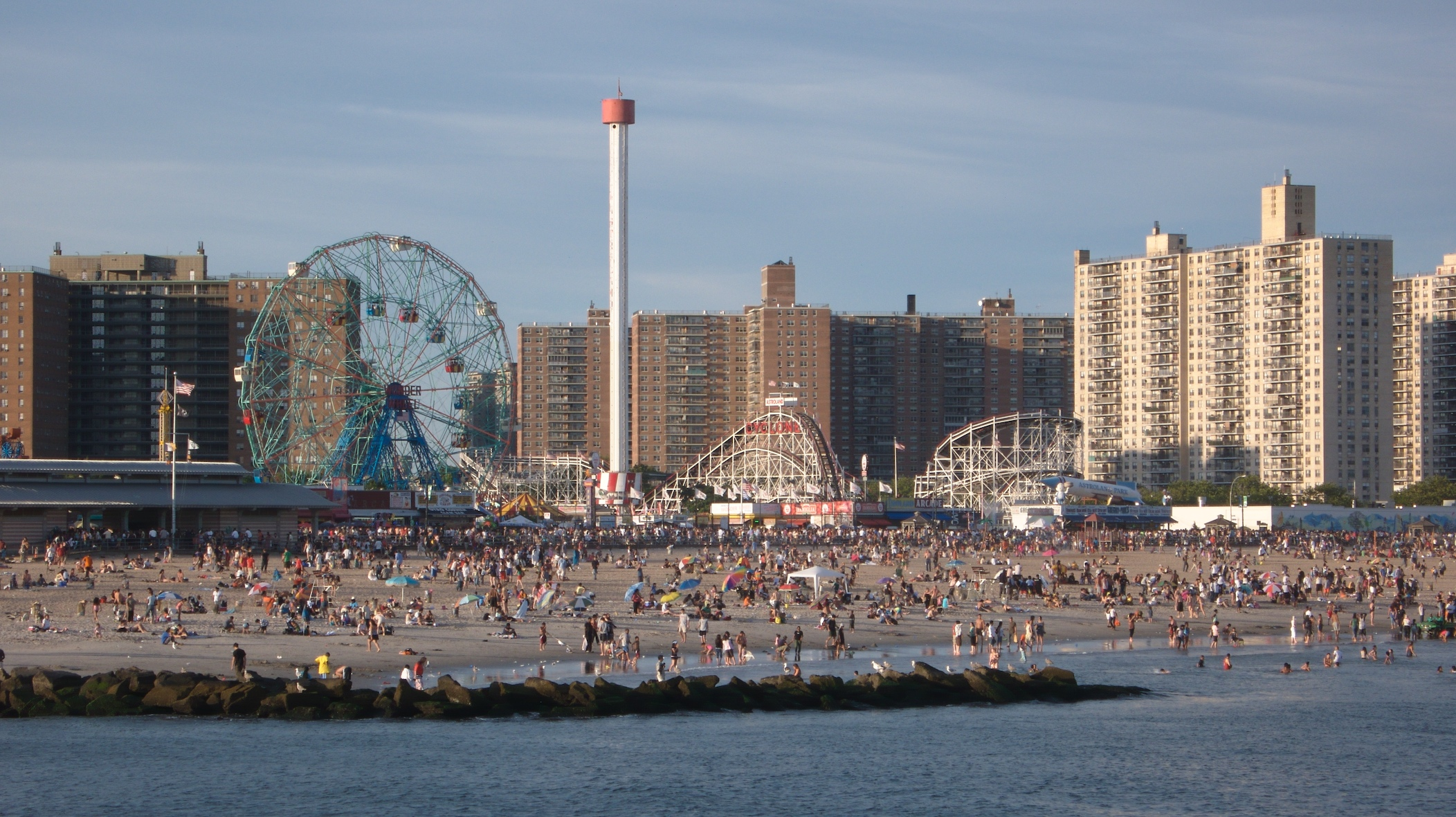
Astroland in Coney Island

- Brooklyn Botanic Garden: adjacent to Prospect Park is the 52-acre (21 ha) botanical garden, which includes a cherry tree esplanade, a one-acre (0.4 ha) rose garden, a Japanese hill, and pond garden, a fragrance garden, a water lily pond esplanade, several conservatories, a rock garden, a native flora garden, a bonsai tree collection, and children's gardens and discovery exhibits.
- Coney Island developed as a playground for the rich in the early 1900s, but it grew as one of America's first amusement grounds and attracted crowds from all over New York. The Cyclone rollercoaster, built-in 1927, is on the National Register of Historic Places. The 1920 Wonder Wheel and other rides are still operational. Coney Island went into decline in the 1970s but has undergone a renaissance.
- Floyd Bennett Field: the first municipal airport in New York City and long-closed for operations, is now part of the National Park System. Many of the historic hangars and runways are still extant. Nature trails and diverse habitats are found within the park, including salt marsh and a restored area of shortgrass prairie that was once widespread on the Hempstead Plains.
- Green-Wood Cemetery, founded by the social reformer Henry Evelyn Pierrepont in 1838, is an early rural cemetery. It is the burial ground of many notable New Yorkers.
- Jamaica Bay Wildlife Refuge: a unique Federal wildlife refuge straddling the Brooklyn–Queens border, part of Gateway National Recreation Area
- New York Transit Museum displays historical artifacts of Greater New York's subway, commuter rail, and bus systems; it is at Court Street, a former Independent Subway System station in Brooklyn Heights on the Fulton Street Line.
- Prospect Park is a public park in central Brooklyn encompassing 585 acres (2.37 km^{2}). The park was designed by Frederick Law Olmsted and Calvert Vaux, who created Manhattan's Central Park. Attractions include the Long Meadow, a 90-acre (36 ha) meadow, the Picnic House, which houses offices and a hall that can accommodate parties with up to 175 guests; Litchfield Villa, Prospect Park Zoo, the Boathouse, housing a visitors center and the first urban Audubon Center; Brooklyn's only lake, covering 60 acres (24 ha); the Prospect Park Bandshell that hosts free outdoor concerts in the summertime; and various sports and fitness activities including seven baseball fields. Prospect Park hosts a popular annual Halloween Parade.
- Fort Greene Park is a public park in the Fort Greene Neighborhood. The park contains the Prison Ship Martyrs' Monument, a monument to American prisoners during the Revolutionary War.

=== Sports ===
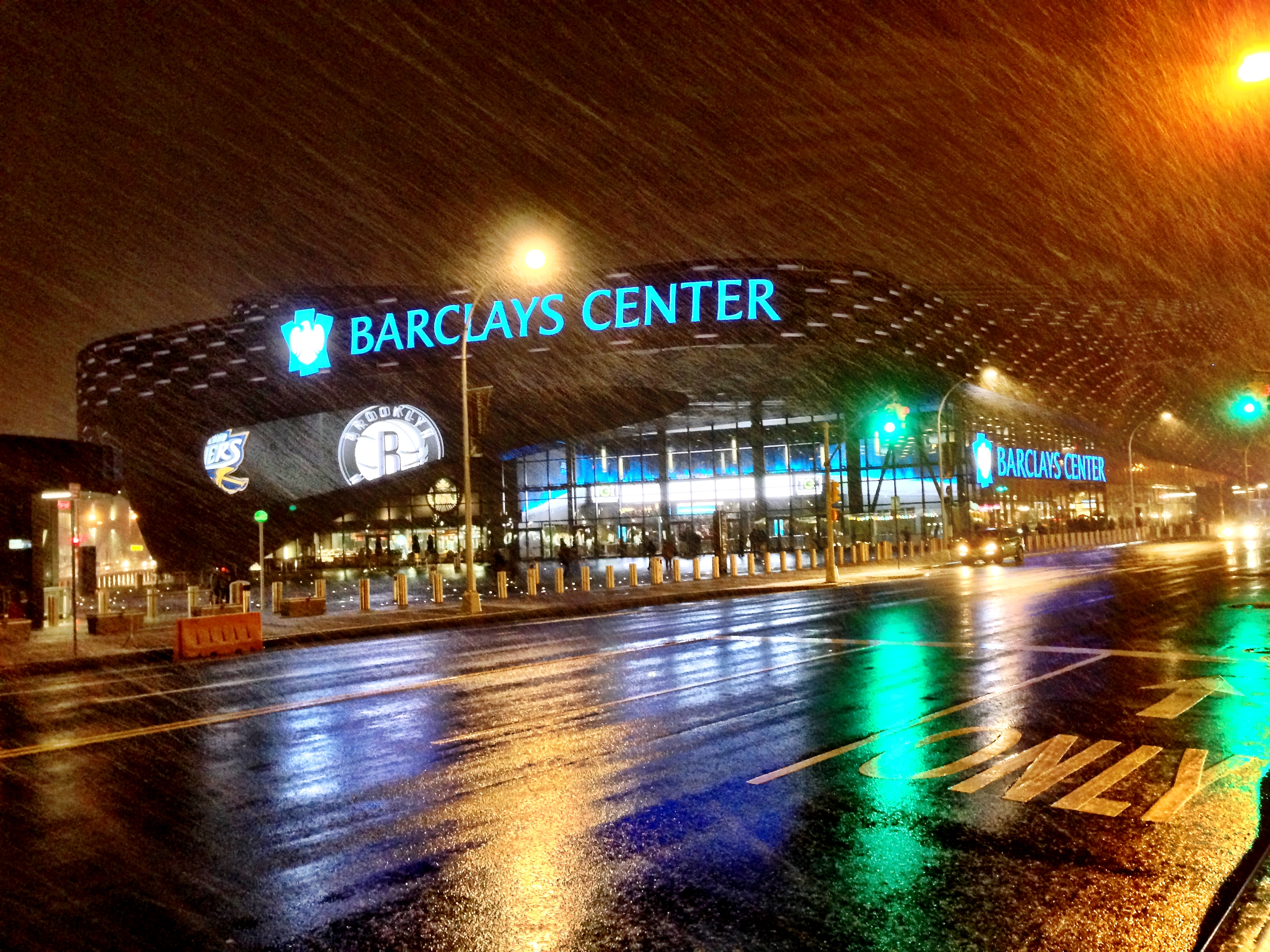
The Barclays Center in Pacific Park within Prospect Heights, home of the Nets and Liberty

Brooklyn's major professional sports team is the NBA's Brooklyn Nets. The Nets moved into the borough in 2012, and play their home games at Barclays Center in Prospect Heights. Previously, the Nets had played in Uniondale, New York and in New Jersey. In April 2020, the New York Liberty of the WNBA were sold to the Nets' owners and moved their home venue from Madison Square Garden to the Barclays Center.

Barclays Center was also the home arena for the NHL's New York Islanders full-time from 2015 to 2018, then part-time from 2018 to 2020 (alternating with Nassau Coliseum in Uniondale). The Islanders had originally played at Nassau Coliseum full-time since their inception until 2015 when their lease at the venue expired and the team moved to Barclays Center. In 2020, the team returned to Nassau Coliseum full-time for one season before moving to the UBS Arena in Elmont, New York in 2021.

Brooklyn also has a storied sports history. It has been home to many famous sports figures such as Joe Paterno, Vince Lombardi, Mike Tyson, Zab Judah, Joe Torre, Sandy Koufax, Billy Cunningham and Vitas Gerulaitis. Basketball legend Michael Jordan was born in Brooklyn though he grew up in Wilmington, North Carolina.

In the earliest days of organized baseball, Brooklyn teams dominated the new game. The second recorded game of baseball was played near what is now Fort Greene Park on October 24, 1845. Brooklyn's Excelsiors, Atlantics and Eckfords were the leading teams from the mid-1850s through the Civil War, and there were dozens of local teams with neighborhood league play, such as at Mapleton Oval. During this "Brooklyn era", baseball evolved into the modern game: the first fastball, first changeup, first batting average, first triple play, first pro baseball player, first enclosed ballpark, first scorecard, first known African-American team, first black championship game, first road trip, first gambling scandal, and first eight pennant winners were all in or from Brooklyn.

Brooklyn's most famous historical team, the Brooklyn Dodgers, named for "trolley dodgers" played at Ebbets Field. In 1947 Jackie Robinson was hired by the Dodgers as the first African-American player in Major League Baseball in the modern era. In 1955, the Dodgers, perennial National League pennant winners, won the only World Series for Brooklyn against their rival New York Yankees. The event was marked by mass euphoria and celebrations. Just two years later, the Dodgers moved to Los Angeles. Walter O'Malley, the team's owner at the time, is still vilified, even by Brooklynites too young to remember the Dodgers as Brooklyn's ball club.

After a 43-year hiatus, professional baseball returned to the borough in 2001 with the Brooklyn Cyclones, a minor league team that plays in MCU Park in Coney Island. They are an affiliate of the New York Mets.

The minor-league New York Cosmos soccer club played its home games at MCU Park in 2017. A new Brooklyn FC will begin play in 2024, fielding a women's team in the first-division USL Super League and a men's team in the second-division USL Championship beginning in 2025.

Brooklyn once had a National Football League team named the Brooklyn Lions in 1926, who played at Ebbets Field.

In rugby union, Rugby United New York joined Major League Rugby in 2019 and played their home games at MCU Park through the 2021 season.

Brooklyn has one of the most active recreational fishing fleets in the United States. In addition to a large private fleet along Jamaica Bay, there is a substantial public fleet within Sheepshead Bay. Species caught include Black Fish, Porgy, Striped Bass, Black Sea Bass, Fluke, and Flounder.

== Government and politics ==
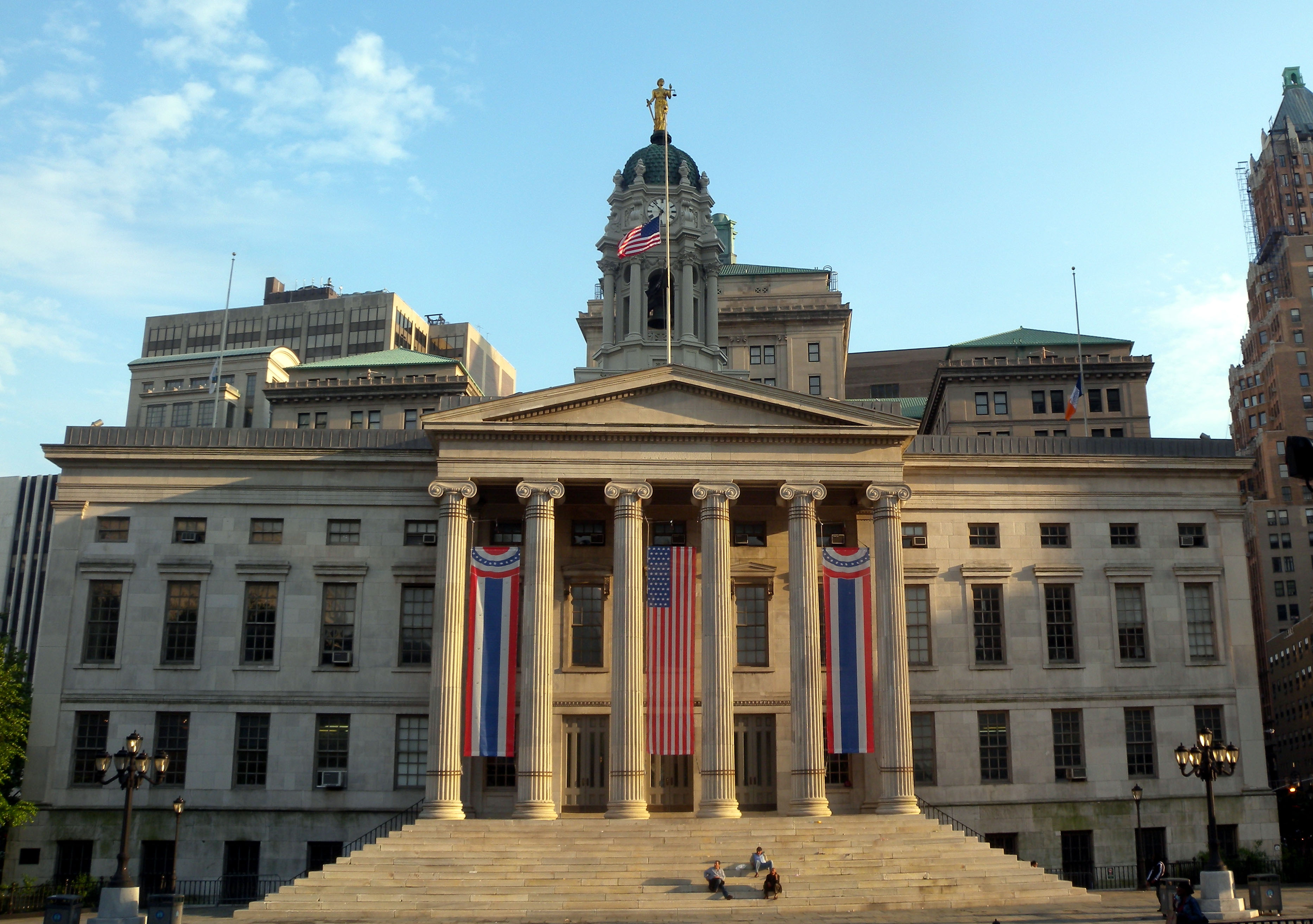
Brooklyn Borough Hall

Each of New York City's five counties, coterminous with each borough, has its own criminal court system and District Attorney, the chief public prosecutor who is directly elected by popular vote. Brooklyn has 16 City Council members, the largest number of any of the five boroughs. The Brooklyn Borough Government includes a borough president and a court, library, borough government board, head of borough government, deputy head of borough government and deputy borough government president.

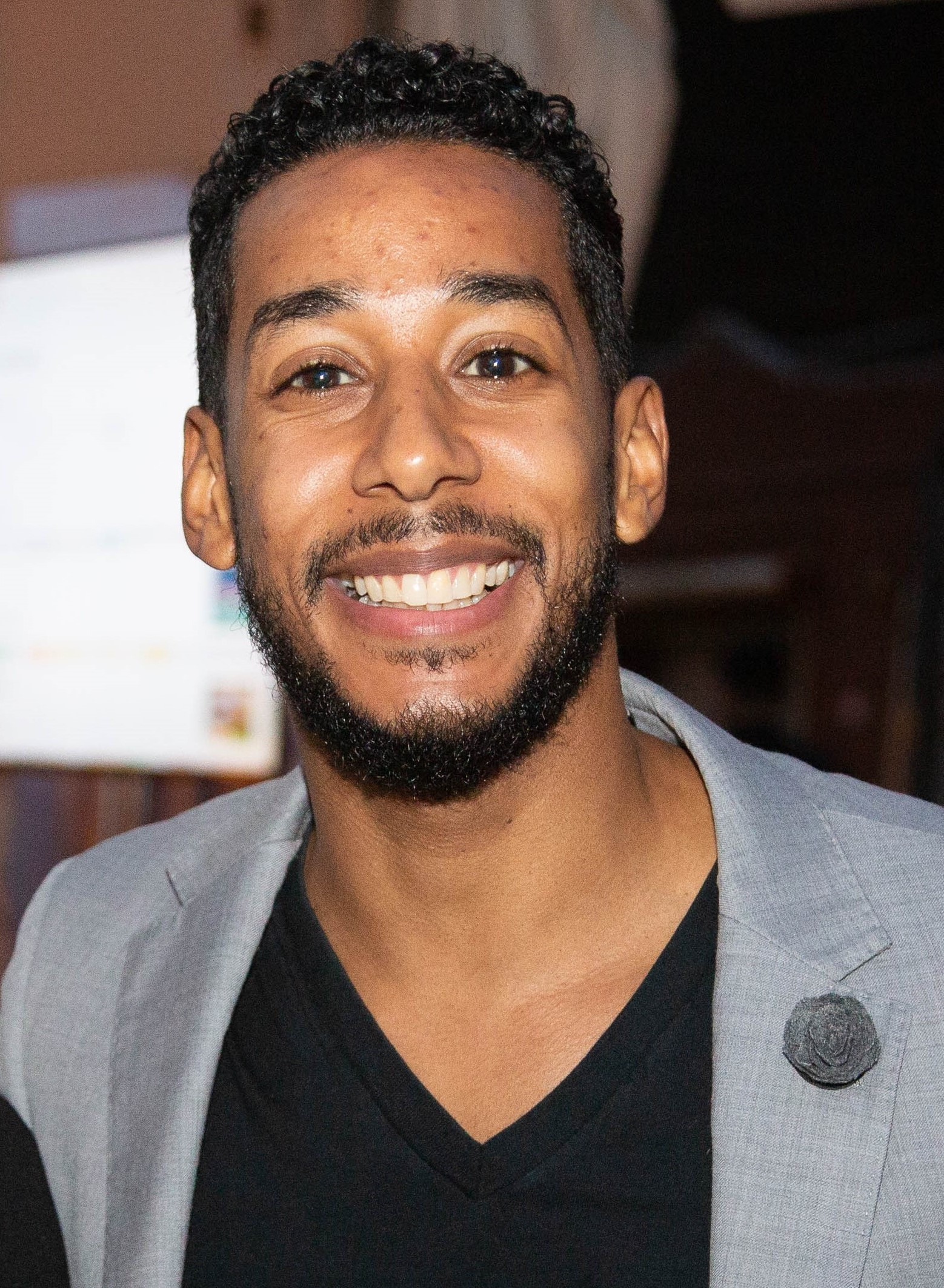
Brooklyn borough president Antonio Reynoso

Brooklyn has 18 of the city's 59 community districts, each served by an unpaid community board with advisory powers under the city's Uniform Land Use Review Procedure. Each board has a paid district manager who acts as an interlocutor with city agencies. The Kings County Democratic County Committee (aka the Brooklyn Democratic Party) is the county committee of the Democratic Party in Brooklyn.

The United States Postal Service operates post offices in Brooklyn. The Brooklyn Main Post Office is located at 271 Cadman Plaza East in Downtown Brooklyn.

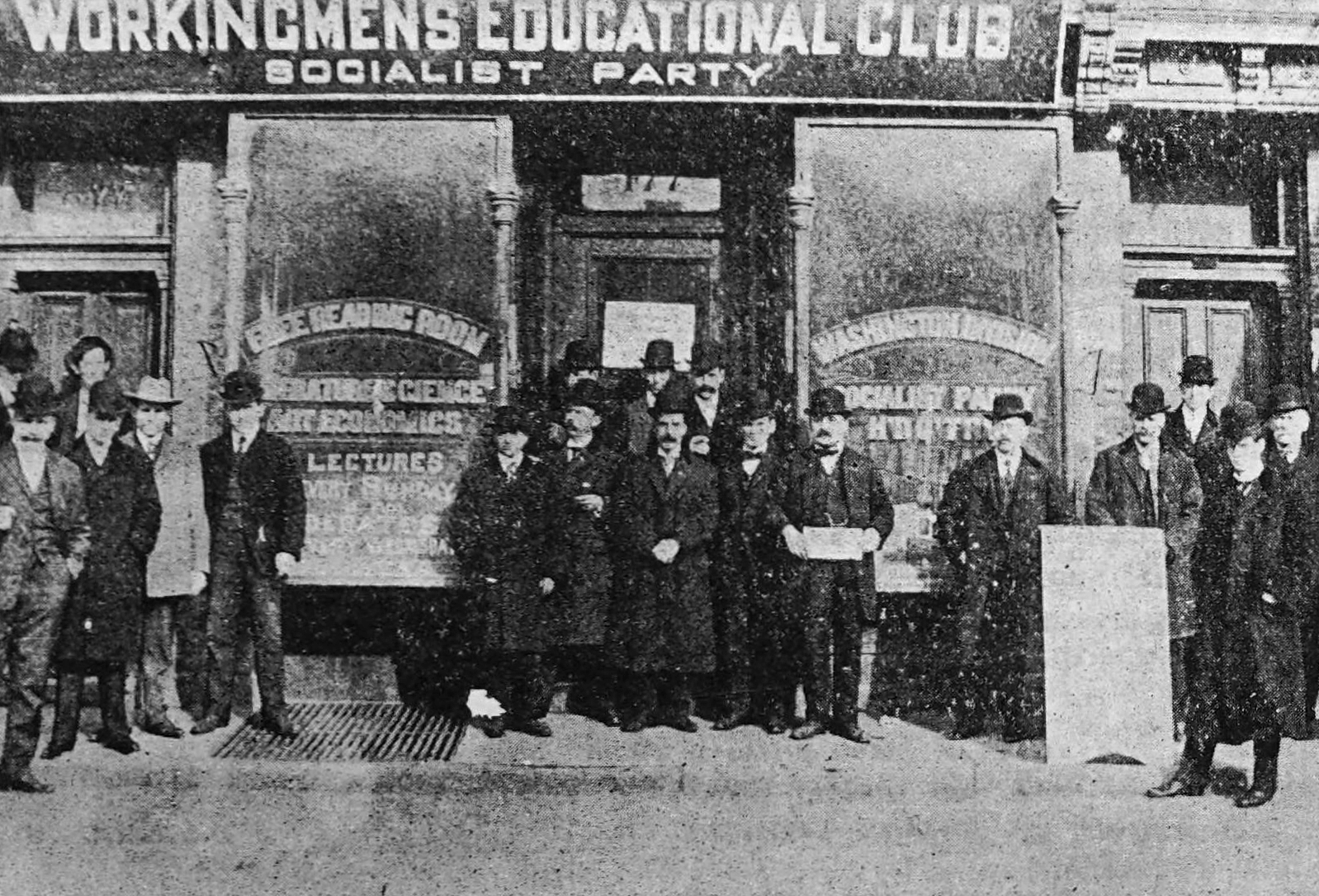
The Workingmen's Educational Club, a meeting hall for the Socialist Party of America at 477 Atlantic Avenue c. July 1909

Brooklyn has been a bastion of left-wing politics since before the turn of the 20th century; with its concentration of workers and immigrants, several socialist and labor parties have found purchase in the borough. In the municipal and state elections of 1917, New York City elected ten assemblymen and seven aldermen of the Socialist Party; three of the assemblymen and two of the aldermen were from Brooklyn. (Note: These were William M. Feigenbaum, Joseph A. Whitehorn and Abraham I. Shiplacoff in the Assembly, and Baruch Charney Vladeck and Barnet Wolff in the Board of Aldermen.) In 1941, shortly before American entry into World War II, Brooklyn elected communist Peter V. Cacchione to the City Council, making him the first open member of the Communist Party elected to public office in the state. Following the 2025 New York City mayoral primary and general election, several neighborhoods in the borough have been identified as part of the so-called "Commie corridor," a region of the city strongly supportive of Zohran Mamdani and other Democratic Socialists.

As is the case with sister boroughs Manhattan and the Bronx, Brooklyn has not voted for a Republican in a national presidential election since Calvin Coolidge in 1924. In the 2008 presidential election, Democrat Barack Obama received 79.4% of the vote in Brooklyn while Republican John McCain received 20.0%. In 2012, Barack Obama increased his Democratic margin of victory in the borough, dominating Brooklyn with 82.0% of the vote to Republican Mitt Romney's 16.9%.

In 2024, Republican Donald Trump reached 27% of the vote, and held Kamala Harris at just over 70%, a significant shift from Joe Biden's performance of over 76% in 2020. While still a decisive Democratic victory, this was the strongest Republican support in Brooklyn since 1988, and the largest number of raw Republican votes there since 1972.

United States presidential election results for Kings County, New York
Year	Republican / Whig		Democratic		Third party(ies)	
Year	No.	%	No.	%	No.	%
1828	1,053	43.84%	1,349	56.16%	0	0.00%
1832	1,264	42.06%	1,741	57.94%	0	0.00%
1836	1,868	44.59%	2,321	55.41%	0	0.00%
1840	3,293	50.86%	3,157	48.76%	24	0.37%
1844	5,107	51.94%	4,648	47.27%	77	0.78%
1848	7,511	56.59%	4,882	36.78%	879	6.62%
1852	8,496	43.97%	10,628	55.00%	199	1.03%
1856	7,846	25.58%	14,174	46.22%	8,647	28.20%
1860	15,883	43.56%	20,583	56.44%	0	0.00%
1864	20,838	44.75%	25,726	55.25%	0	0.00%
1868	27,707	41.02%	39,838	58.98%	0	0.00%
1872	33,369	46.68%	38,108	53.31%	10	0.01%
1876	39,066	40.41%	57,556	59.53%	62	0.06%
1880	51,751	45.66%	61,062	53.88%	516	0.46%
1884	53,516	42.37%	69,264	54.83%	3,541	2.80%
1888	70,052	45.49%	82,507	53.58%	1,430	0.93%
1892	70,505	39.97%	100,160	56.78%	5,720	3.24%
1896	109,135	56.35%	76,882	39.70%	7,659	3.95%
1900	108,977	49.57%	106,232	48.32%	4,639	2.11%
1904	113,246	48.12%	111,855	47.53%	10,216	4.34%
1908	119,789	50.64%	96,756	40.90%	20,025	8.46%
1912	51,239	20.94%	109,748	44.86%	83,676	34.20%
1916	120,752	46.90%	125,625	48.79%	11,080	4.30%
1920	292,692	63.32%	119,612	25.88%	49,944	10.80%
1924	236,877	47.50%	158,907	31.87%	102,903	20.63%
1928	245,622	36.13%	404,393	59.48%	29,822	4.39%
1932	192,536	25.04%	514,172	66.86%	62,300	8.10%
1936	212,852	21.85%	738,306	75.78%	23,143	2.38%
1940	394,534	34.44%	742,668	64.83%	8,365	0.73%
1944	393,926	34.01%	758,270	65.46%	6,168	0.53%
1948	330,494	30.49%	579,922	53.51%	173,401	16.00%
1952	446,708	39.82%	656,229	58.50%	18,765	1.67%
1956	460,456	45.23%	557,655	54.77%	0	0.00%
1960	327,497	33.51%	646,582	66.16%	3,227	0.33%
1964	229,291	25.05%	684,839	74.80%	1,373	0.15%
1968	247,936	31.99%	489,174	63.12%	37,859	4.89%
1972	373,903	48.96%	387,768	50.78%	1,949	0.26%
1976	190,728	31.08%	419,382	68.34%	3,533	0.58%
1980	200,306	38.44%	288,893	55.44%	31,893	6.12%
1984	230,064	38.29%	368,518	61.34%	2,189	0.36%
1988	178,961	32.60%	363,916	66.28%	6,142	1.12%
1992	133,344	22.93%	411,183	70.70%	37,067	6.37%
1996	81,406	15.08%	432,232	80.07%	26,195	4.85%
2000	96,609	15.65%	497,513	80.60%	23,115	3.74%
2004	167,149	24.30%	514,973	74.86%	5,762	0.84%
2008	151,872	19.99%	603,525	79.43%	4,451	0.59%
2012	124,551	16.90%	604,443	82.02%	7,988	1.08%
2016	141,044	17.51%	640,553	79.51%	24,008	2.98%
2020	202,772	22.14%	703,310	76.78%	9,927	1.08%
2024	233,964	27.40%	601,265	70.43%	18,515	2.17%

=== Federal representation ===
As of 2023, four Democrats and one Republican represented Brooklyn in the United States House of Representatives. One congressional district lies entirely within the borough.

- Nydia Velázquez (first elected in 1992) represents New York's 7th congressional district, which includes the central-west Brooklyn neighborhoods of Boerum Hill, Brooklyn Heights, Bushwick, Carroll Gardens, Cobble Hill, Dumbo, East New York, East Williamsburg, Greenpoint, Gowanus, Red Hook, Sunset Park, and Williamsburg. The district also covers a small portion of Queens.
- Hakeem Jeffries (first elected in 2012) represents New York's 8th congressional district, which includes the southern Brooklyn neighborhoods of Bedford-Stuyvesant, Bergen Beach, Brighton Beach, Brownsville, Canarsie, Clinton Hill, Coney Island, East Flatbush, East New York, Fort Greene, Gerritsen Beach, Marine Park, Mill Basin, Ocean Hill, Sheepshead Bay, and Spring Creek. The district also covers a small portion of Queens.
- Yvette Clarke (first elected in 2006) represents New York's 9th congressional district, which includes the central and southern Brooklyn neighborhoods of Crown Heights, East Flatbush, Flatbush, Midwood, Park Slope, Prospect Heights, Prospect Lefferts Gardens, and Windsor Terrace.
- Dan Goldman (first elected in 2022) represents New York's 10th congressional district, which includes the southwestern Brooklyn neighborhoods of Midwood, Red Hook, Sunset Park, Bensonhurst, Borough Park, Gravesend, Kensington, and Mapleton. The district also covers the West Side of Manhattan.
- Nicole Malliotakis (first elected in 2020) represents New York's 11th congressional district, which includes the southwestern Brooklyn neighborhoods of Bensonhurst, Gravesend, Bath Beach, Bay Ridge, and Dyker Heights. The district also covers all of Staten Island.

Party affiliation of Brooklyn registered voters (relative percentages)
Party	2005	2004	2003	2002	2001	2000	1999	1998	1997	1996
Democratic	69.7	69.2	70.0	70.1	70.6	70.3	70.7	70.8	70.8	71.0
Republican	10.1	10.1	10.1	10.1	10.2	10.5	10.9	11.1	11.3	11.5
Other	3.7	3.9	3.8	3.6	2.9	2.8	2.5	2.8	2.3	2.3
No affiliation	16.5	16.9	16.1	16.2	16.3	16.5	15.9	15.5	15.4	15.2

== Housing ==
Brooklyn offers a wide array of private housing, as well as public housing, which is administered by the New York City Housing Authority (NYCHA). Affordable rental and co-operative housing units throughout the borough were created under the Mitchell–Lama Housing Program.

There were 1,101,441 housing units in 2022 at an average density of 15,876 units per square mile (6,130/km^{2}). Public housing administered by NYCHA accounts for more than 100,000 residents in nearly 50,000 units in 2023.

== Education ==
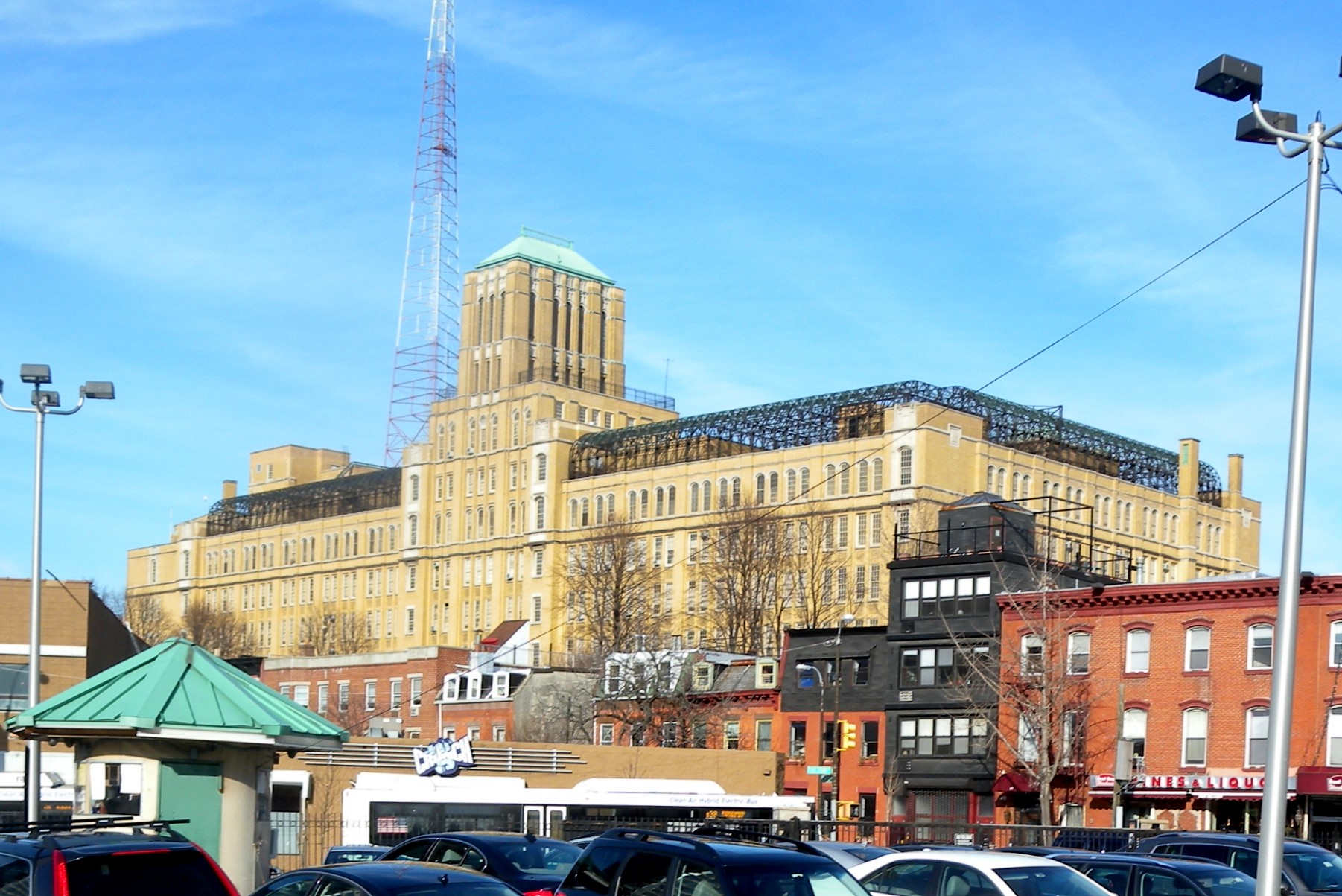
Brooklyn Tech as seen from Ashland Place in Fort Greene

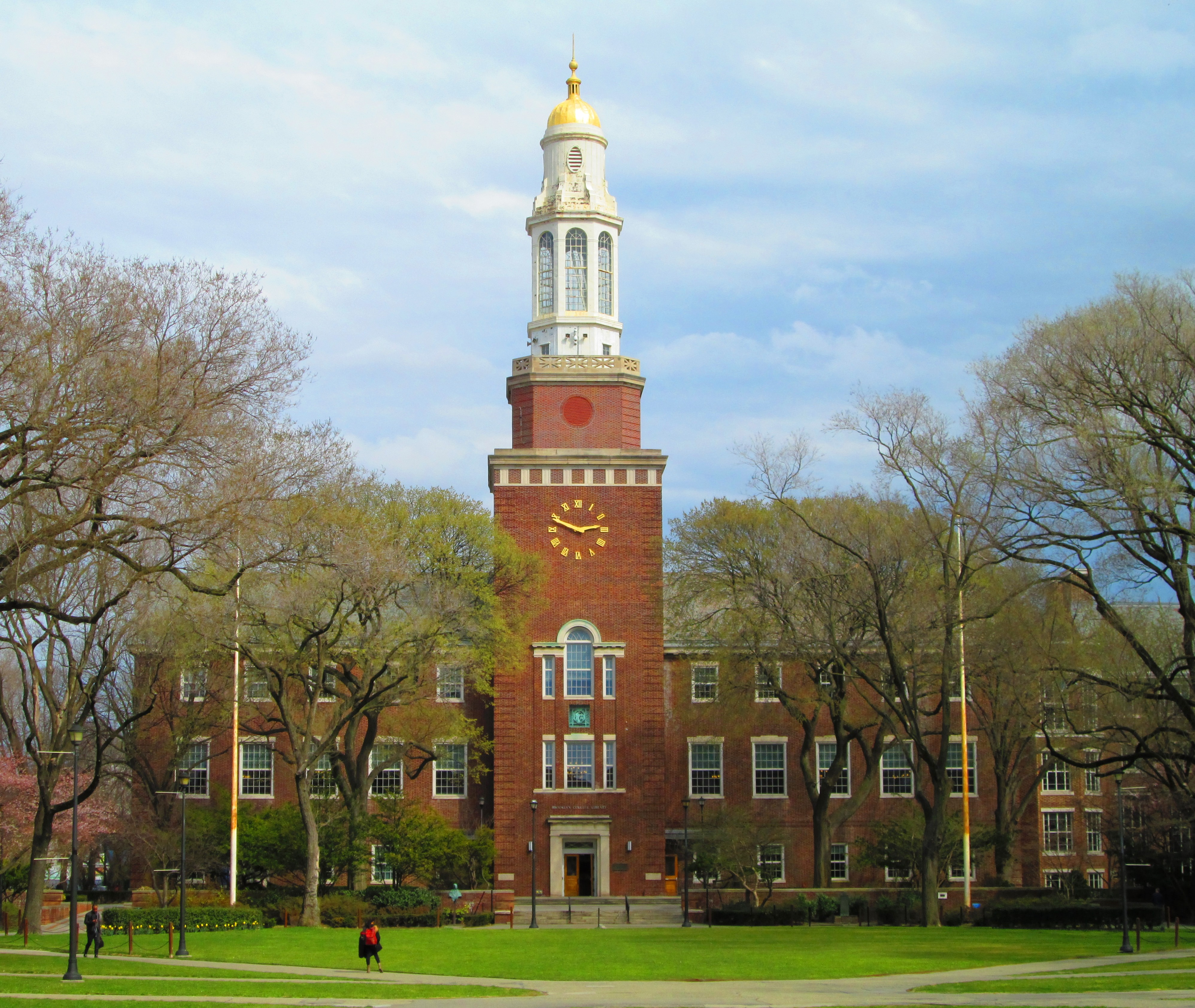
The Brooklyn College library, part of the original campus laid out by Randolph Evans, now known as "East Quad"

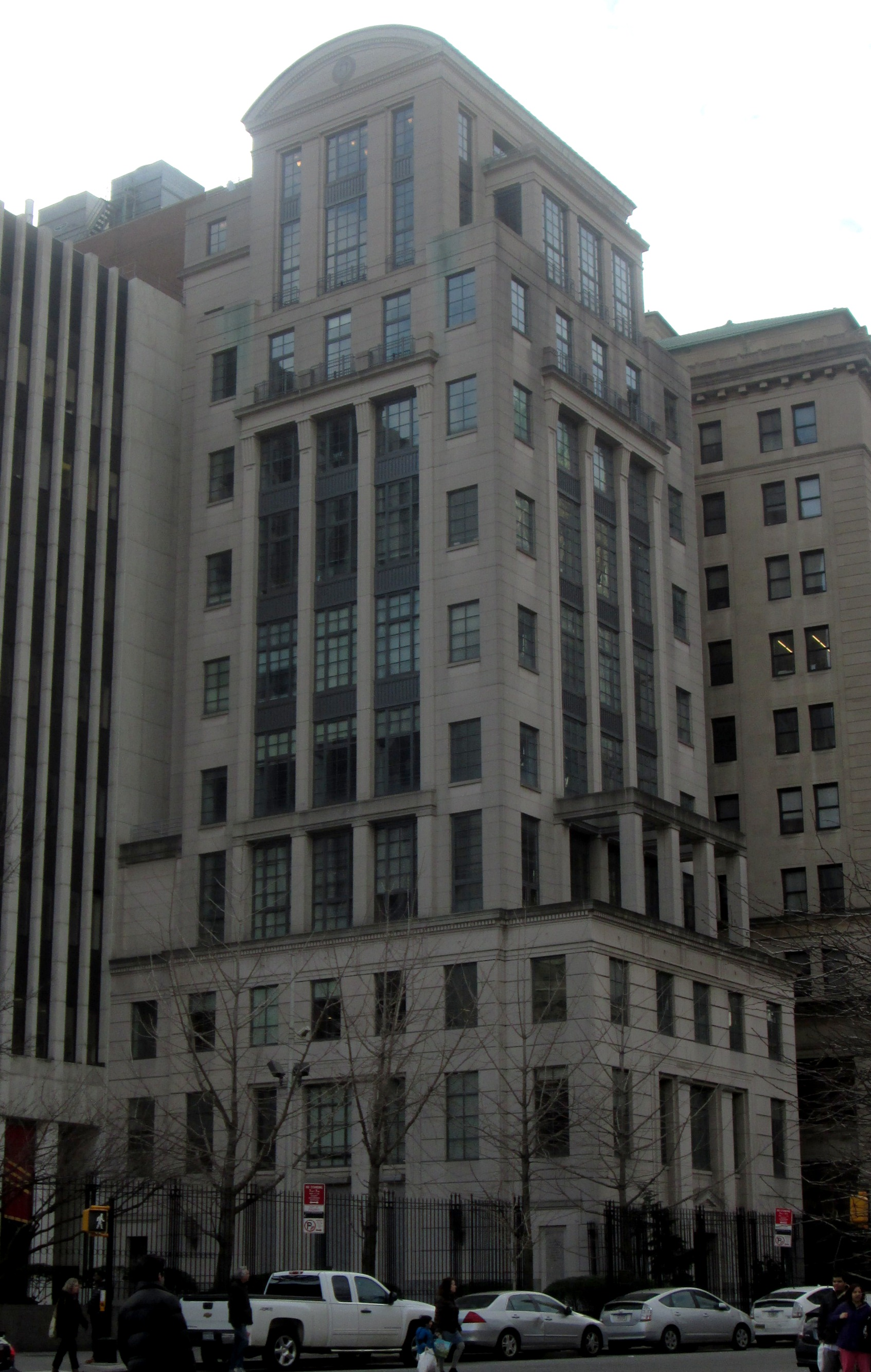
Brooklyn Law School's 1994 new classical "Fell Hall" tower, by architect Robert A. M. Stern

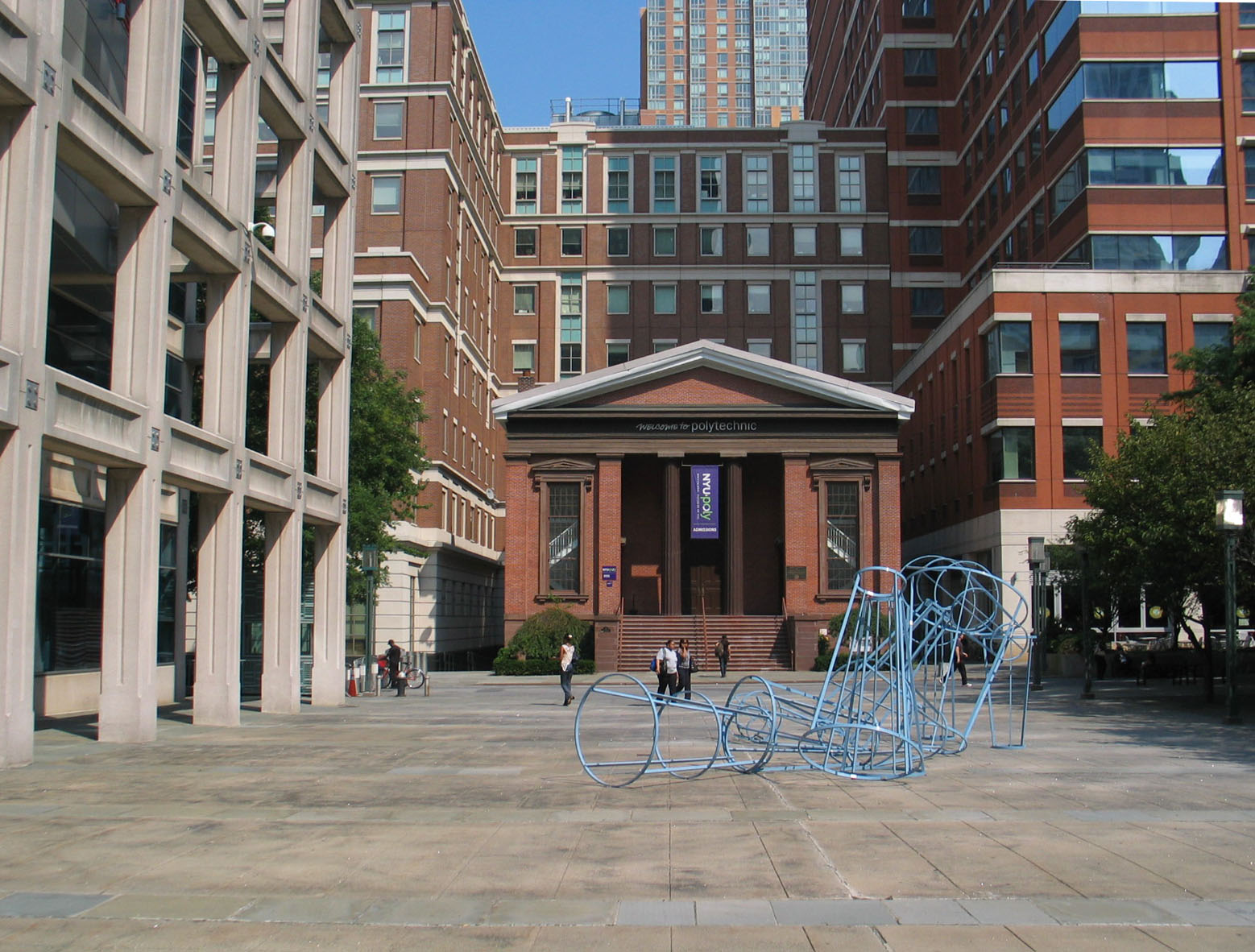
NYU Tandon Wunsch Building

Education in Brooklyn is provided by a vast number of public and private institutions. Non-charter public schools in the borough are managed by the New York City Department of Education, the largest public school system in the United States.

Brooklyn Technical High School, commonly called Brooklyn Tech, a New York City public high school, is the largest specialized high school for science, mathematics, and technology in the United States. Brooklyn Tech opened in 1922. Brooklyn Tech is across the street from Fort Greene Park. This high school was built from 1930 to 1933 at a cost of about $6 million and is 12 stories high. It covers about half of a city block. Brooklyn Tech is noted for its famous alumni (including two Nobel Laureates), its academics, and a large number of graduates attending prestigious universities.

=== Higher education ===
==== Public colleges ====
Brooklyn College is a senior college of the City University of New York (CUNY), and was the first public coeducational liberal arts college in New York City. The college ranked in the top 10 nationally for the second consecutive year in Princeton Review's 2006 guidebook, America's Best Value Colleges. Many of its students are first and second-generation Americans. Founded in 1970, Medgar Evers College is a senior college of the City University of New York. The college offers programs at the baccalaureate and associate degree levels, as well as adult and continuing education classes for central Brooklyn residents, corporations, government agencies, and community organizations. Medgar Evers College is a few blocks east of Prospect Park in Crown Heights.

CUNY's New York City College of Technology (City Tech) of The City University of New York (Downtown Brooklyn/Brooklyn Heights) is the largest public college of technology in New York State and a national model for technological education. Established in 1946, City Tech can trace its roots to 1881 when the Technical Schools of the Metropolitan Museum of Art were renamed the New York Trade School. That institution—which became the Voorhees Technical Institute many decades later—was soon a model for the development of technical and vocational schools worldwide. In 1971, Voorhees was incorporated into City Tech.

SUNY Downstate College of Medicine, founded as the Long Island College Hospital in 1860, is the oldest hospital-based medical school in the United States. The Medical Center comprises the College of Medicine, College of Health Related Professions, College of Nursing, School of Public Health, School of Graduate Studies, and University Hospital of Brooklyn. The Nobel Prize winner Robert F. Furchgott was a member of its faculty. Half of the Medical Center's students are minorities or immigrants. The College of Medicine has the highest percentage of minority students of any medical school in New York State.

==== Private colleges ====
Adelphi University, based in Garden City, moved its Manhattan Campus in 2023 to a new location on Livingston Street in Downtown Brooklyn. The move marks a return to Brooklyn for the university, which originated on Adelphi Street with the Adelphi Academy. The facility is shared with St. Francis College, which has created a new campus at 179 Livingston Street.

Brooklyn Law School was founded in 1901 and is notable for its diverse student body. Women and African Americans were enrolled in 1909. According to the Leiter Report, a compendium of law school rankings published by Brian Leiter, Brooklyn Law School places 31st nationally for the quality of students.

Long Island University is a private university headquartered in Brookville on Long Island, with a campus in Downtown Brooklyn with 6,417 undergraduate students. The Brooklyn campus has strong science and medical technology programs, at the graduate and undergraduate levels.

Pratt Institute, in Clinton Hill, is a private college founded in 1887 with programs in engineering, architecture, and the arts. Some buildings in the school's Brooklyn campus are official landmarks. Pratt has over 4700 students, with most at its Brooklyn campus. Graduate programs include a library and information science, architecture, and urban planning. Undergraduate programs include architecture, construction management, writing, critical and visual studies, industrial design and fine arts, totaling over 25 programs in all.

The New York University Tandon School of Engineering, the United States' second oldest private institute of technology, founded in 1854, has its main campus in Downtown's MetroTech Center, a commercial, civic and educational redevelopment project of which it was a key sponsor. NYU-Tandon is one of the 18 schools and colleges that comprise New York University (NYU).

St. Francis College is a Catholic college in Downtown Brooklyn founded in 1859 by Franciscan friars. Over 2,400 students attend the small liberal arts college. St. Francis is considered by The New York Times as one of the more diverse colleges, and was ranked one of the best baccalaureate colleges by Forbes magazine and U.S. News & World Report.

Brooklyn also has smaller liberal arts institutions, such as Saint Joseph's College in Clinton Hill and Boricua College in Williamsburg.

==== Community colleges ====
Kingsborough Community College is a junior college in the City University of New York system in Manhattan Beach.

==== Public Colleges ====
New York City College of Technology (City Tech) is a public college in New York City. Founded in 1946, it is the City University of New York's college of technology. Its main urban campus is located in Downtown Brooklyn.

== Brooklyn Public Library ==
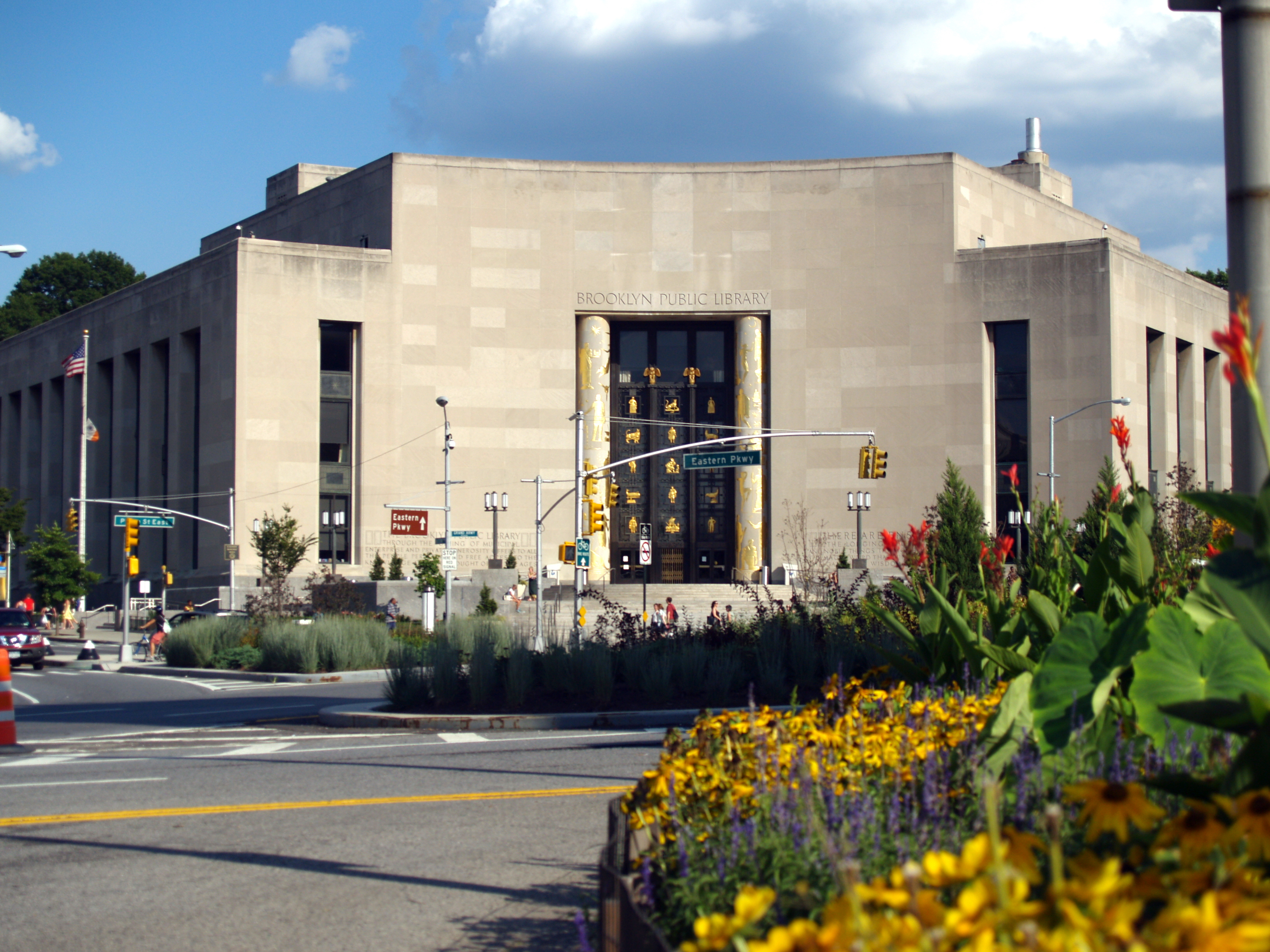
The Central Library at Grand Army Plaza

As an independent system, separate from the New York and Queens public library systems, the Brooklyn Public Library offers thousands of public programs, millions of books, and use of more than 850 free Internet-accessible computers. It also has books and periodicals in all the major languages spoken in Brooklyn, including English, Russian, Chinese, Spanish, Hebrew, and Haitian Creole, as well as French, Yiddish, Hindi, Bengali, Polish, Italian, and Arabic. The Central Library is a landmarked building facing Grand Army Plaza.

There are 58 library branches, placing one within a half-mile of each Brooklyn resident. In addition to its specialized Business Library in Brooklyn Heights, the Library is preparing to construct its new Visual & Performing Arts Library (VPA) in the BAM Cultural District, which will focus on the link between new and emerging arts and technology and house traditional and digital collections. It will provide access and training to arts applications and technologies not widely available to the public. The collections will include the subjects of art, theater, dance, music, film, photography, and architecture. A special archive will house the records and history of Brooklyn's arts communities.

== Transportation ==
=== Public transport ===
In 2015, about 57 percent of all households in Brooklyn were households without automobiles. The citywide rate is 55 percent in New York City.

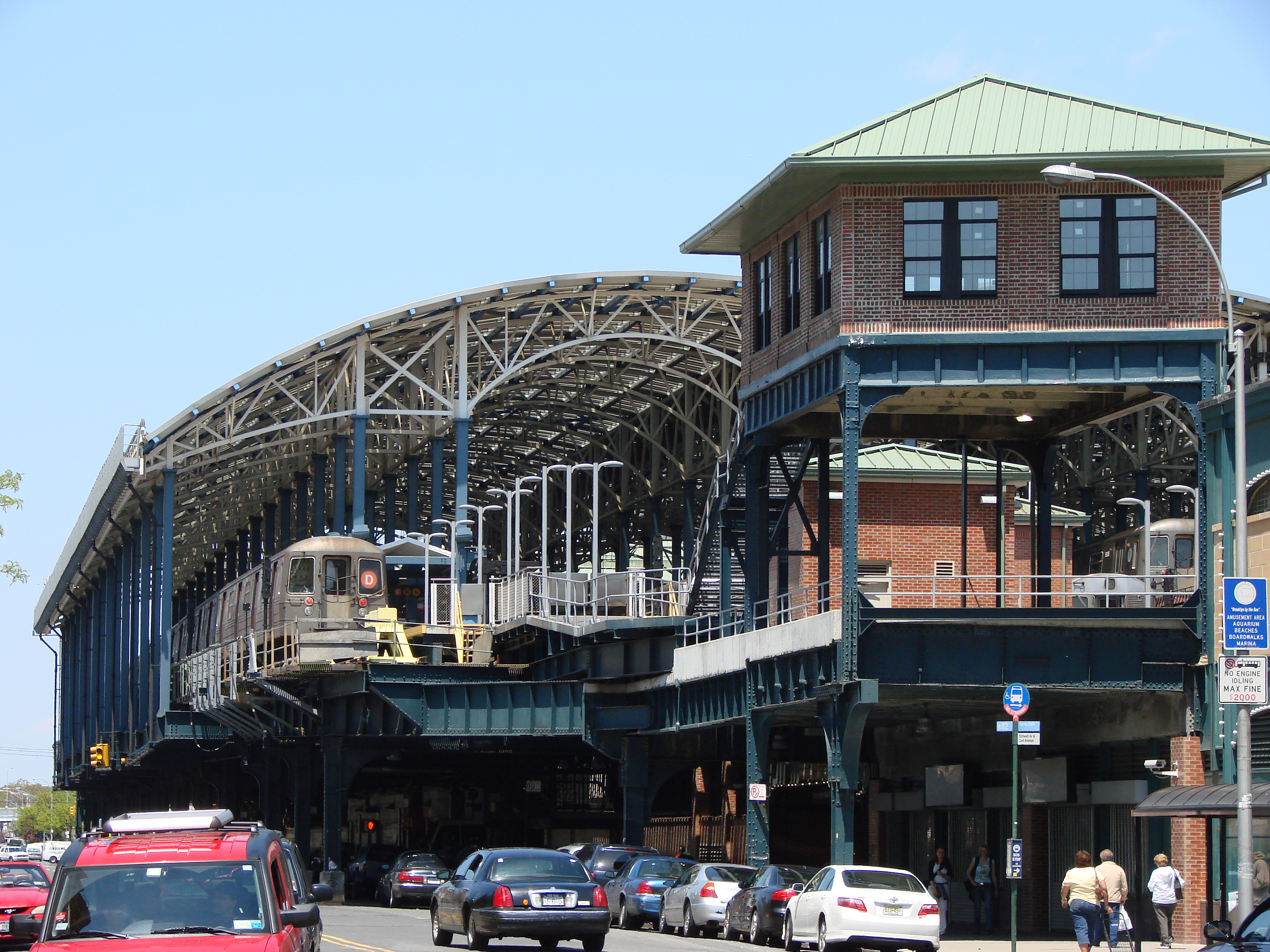
The Coney Island–Stillwell Avenue subway station

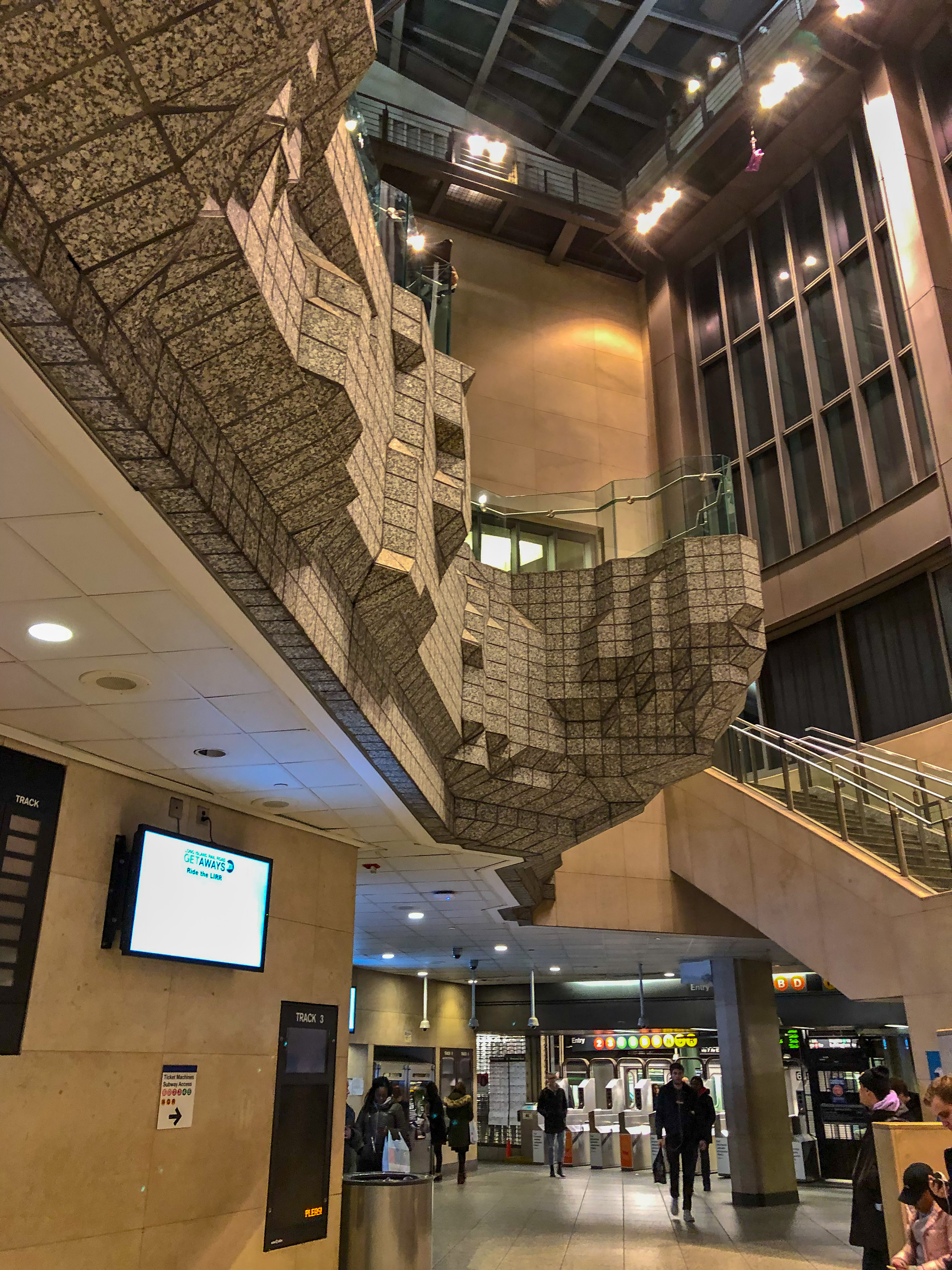
Atlantic Terminal is a major hub in Brooklyn.

Brooklyn features extensive public transit. Nineteen New York City Subway services, including the Franklin Avenue Shuttle, traverse the borough. Approximately 92.8% of Brooklyn residents traveling to Manhattan use the subway, despite the fact some neighborhoods like Flatlands and Marine Park are poorly served by subway service. Major stations, out of the 170 currently in Brooklyn, include:

- Atlantic Avenue–Barclays Center
- Broadway Junction
- DeKalb Avenue
- Jay Street–MetroTech
- Coney Island–Stillwell Avenue

Proposed New York City Subway lines never built include a line along Nostrand or Utica Avenues to Marine Park, as well as a subway line to Spring Creek.

Brooklyn was once served by an extensive network of streetcars, but many were replaced by the public bus network that covers the entire borough. There is also daily express bus service into Manhattan. New York's famous yellow cabs also provide transportation in Brooklyn, although they are less numerous in the borough. There are three commuter rail stations in Brooklyn: East New York, Nostrand Avenue, and Atlantic Terminal, the terminus of the Atlantic Branch of the Long Island Rail Road. The terminal is near the Atlantic Avenue–Barclays Center subway station, with ten connecting subway services.

In February 2015, Mayor Bill de Blasio announced that the city government would begin a citywide ferry service called NYC Ferry to extend ferry transportation to communities in the city that have been traditionally underserved by public transit. The ferry opened in May 2017, with the Bay Ridge ferry serving southwestern Brooklyn and the East River Ferry serving northwestern Brooklyn. A third route, the Rockaway ferry, makes one stop in the borough at Brooklyn Army Terminal.

A streetcar line, the Brooklyn–Queens Connector, was proposed by the city in February 2016, with the planned timeline calling for service to begin around 2024.

=== Roadways ===
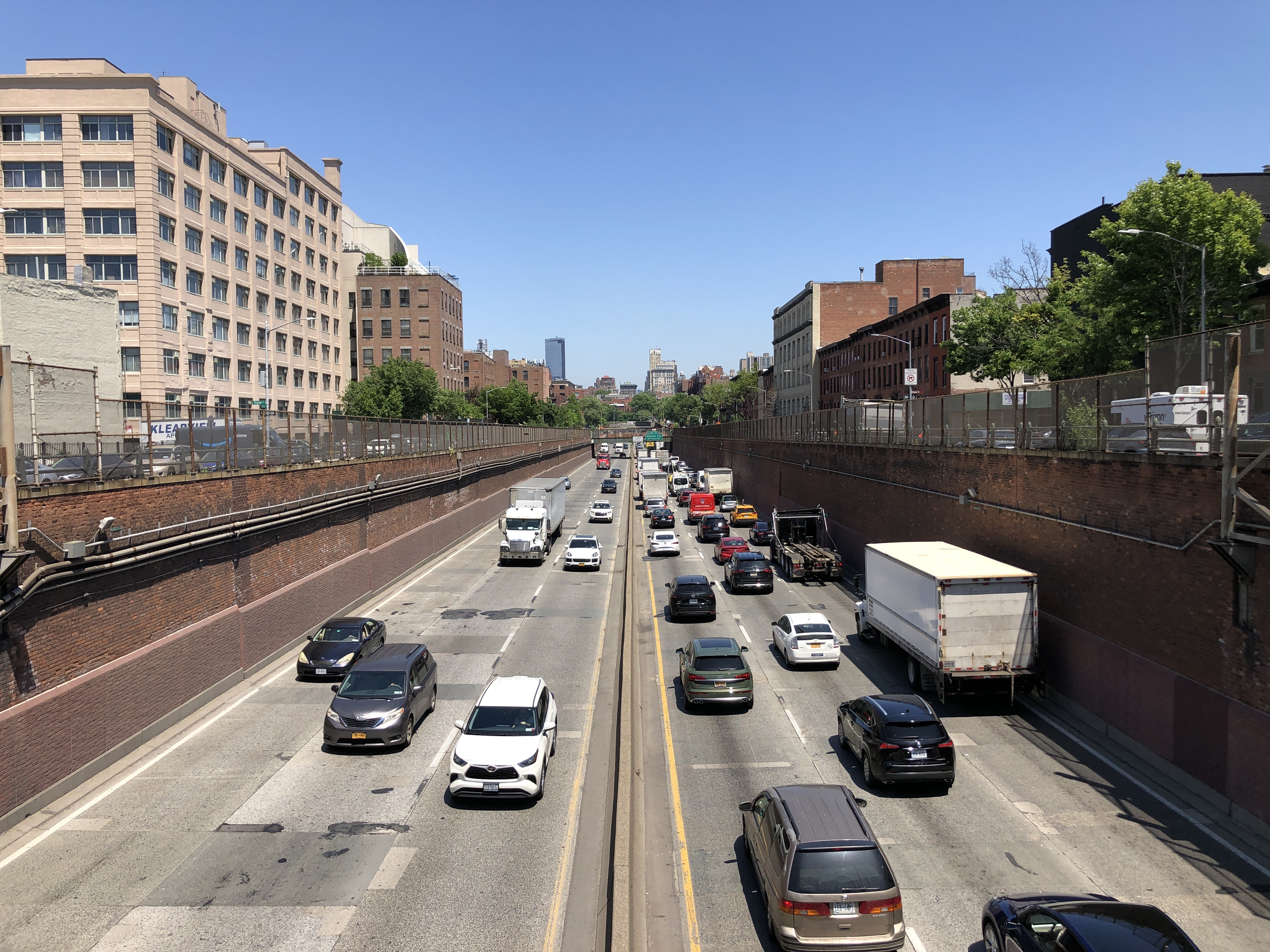
The BQE between Red Hook and Brooklyn Heights

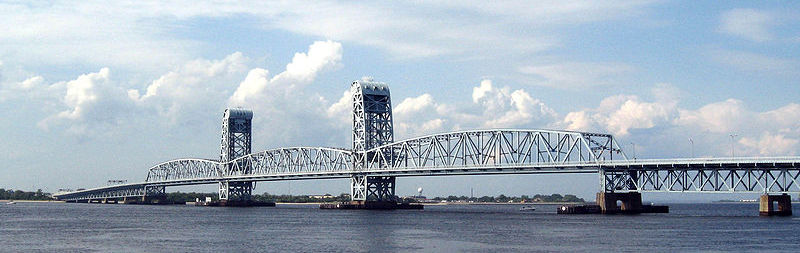
The Marine Parkway Bridge

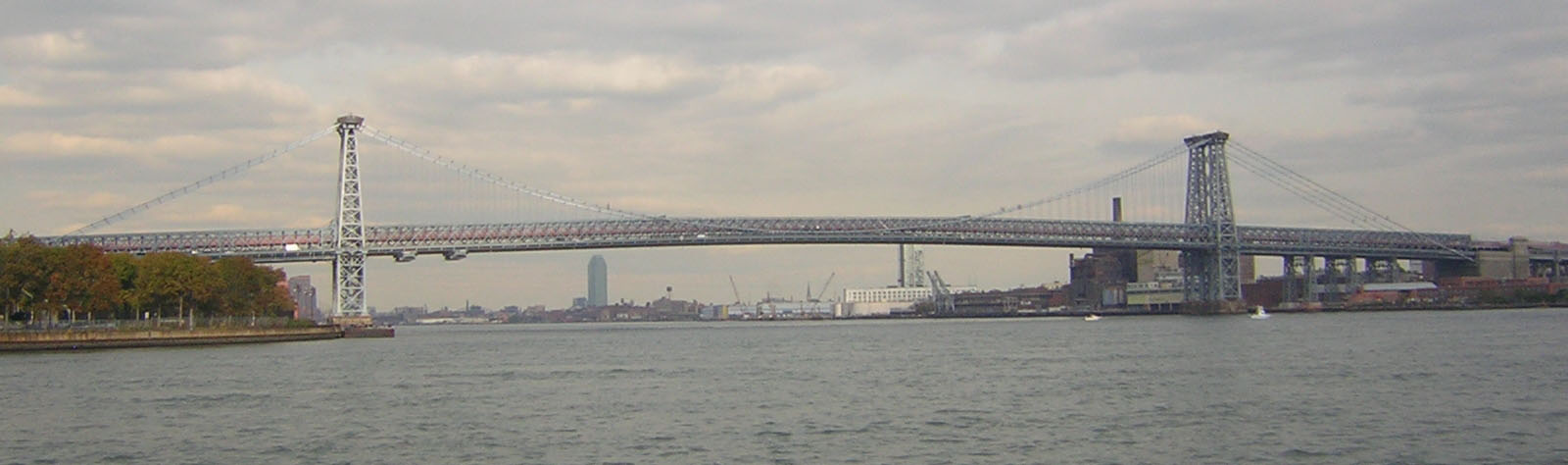
Williamsburg Bridge, as seen from Wallabout Bay with Greenpoint and Long Island City in background

Most of the limited-access expressways and parkways are in the western and southern sections of Brooklyn, where the borough's two interstate highways are located; Interstate 278, which uses the Gowanus Expressway and the Brooklyn–Queens Expressway, traverses Sunset Park and Brooklyn Heights, while Interstate 478 is an unsigned route designation for the Brooklyn–Battery Tunnel, which connects to Manhattan. Other prominent roadways are the Prospect Expressway (New York State Route 27), the Belt Parkway, and the Jackie Robinson Parkway (formerly the Interborough Parkway). Planned expressways that were never built include the Bushwick Expressway, an extension of I-78 and the Cross-Brooklyn Expressway, I-878. Major thoroughfares include Atlantic Avenue, Fourth Avenue, 86th Street, Kings Highway, Bay Parkway, Ocean Parkway, Eastern Parkway, Linden Boulevard, McGuinness Boulevard, Flatbush Avenue, Pennsylvania Avenue, and Nostrand Avenue.

Much of Brooklyn has only named streets, but Park Slope, Bay Ridge, Sunset Park, Bensonhurst, and Borough Park and the other western sections have numbered streets running approximately northwest to southeast, and numbered avenues going approximately northeast to southwest. East of Dahill Road, lettered avenues (like Avenue M) run east and west, and numbered streets have the prefix "East". South of Avenue O, related numbered streets west of Dahill Road use the "West" designation.

This set of numbered streets ranges from West 37th Street to East 108 Street, and the avenues range from A–Z with names substituted for some of them in some neighborhoods (notably Albemarle, Beverley, Cortelyou, Dorchester, Ditmas, Foster, Farragut, Glenwood, Quentin). Numbered streets prefixed by "North" and "South" in Williamsburg, and "Bay", "Beach", "Brighton", "Plumb", "Paerdegat" or "Flatlands" along the southern and southwestern waterfront are loosely based on the old grids of the original towns of Kings County that eventually consolidated to form Brooklyn. These names often reflect the bodies of water or beaches around them, such as Plumb Beach or Paerdegat Basin.

Brooklyn is connected to Manhattan by three bridges, the Brooklyn, Manhattan, and Williamsburg Bridge; a vehicular tunnel, the Brooklyn–Battery Tunnel (also known as the Hugh L. Carey Tunnel); and several subway tunnels. The Verrazzano–Narrows Bridge links Brooklyn with the more suburban borough of Staten Island. Though much of its border is on land, Brooklyn shares several water crossings with Queens, including the Pulaski Bridge, the Greenpoint Avenue Bridge, the Kosciuszko Bridge (part of the Brooklyn–Queens Expressway), and the Grand Street Bridge, all of which carry traffic over Newtown Creek, and the Marine Parkway Bridge connecting Brooklyn to the Rockaway Peninsula.

=== Waterways ===
Brooklyn was long a major shipping port, especially at the Brooklyn Army Terminal and Bush Terminal in Sunset Park. Most container ship cargo operations have shifted to the New Jersey side of New York Harbor, while the Brooklyn Cruise Terminal in Red Hook is a focal point for New York's growing cruise industry. The Queen Mary 2, one of the world's largest ocean liners, was designed specifically to fit under the Verrazzano–Narrows Bridge, the longest suspension bridge in the United States. She makes regular ports of call at the Red Hook terminal on her transatlantic crossings from Southampton, England. The Brooklyn waterfront formerly employed tens of thousands of borough residents and acted as an incubator for industries across the entire city, and the decline of the port exacerbated Brooklyn's decline in the second half of the 20th century.

In February 2015, Mayor Bill de Blasio announced that the city government would begin NYC Ferry to extend ferry transportation to traditionally underserved communities in the city. The ferry opened in May 2017, offering commuter services from the western shore of Brooklyn to Manhattan via three routes. The East River Ferry serves points in Lower Manhattan, Midtown, Long Island City, and northwestern Brooklyn via its East River route. The South Brooklyn and Rockaway routes serve southwestern Brooklyn before terminating in lower Manhattan. Ferries to Coney Island are also planned.

NY Waterway offers tours and charters. SeaStreak also offers a weekday ferry service between the Brooklyn Army Terminal and the Manhattan ferry slips at Pier 11/Wall Street downtown and East 34th Street Ferry Landing in midtown. A Cross-Harbor Rail Tunnel, originally proposed in the 1920s as a core project for the then-new Port Authority of New York is again being studied and discussed as a way to ease freight movements across a large swath of the metropolitan area.

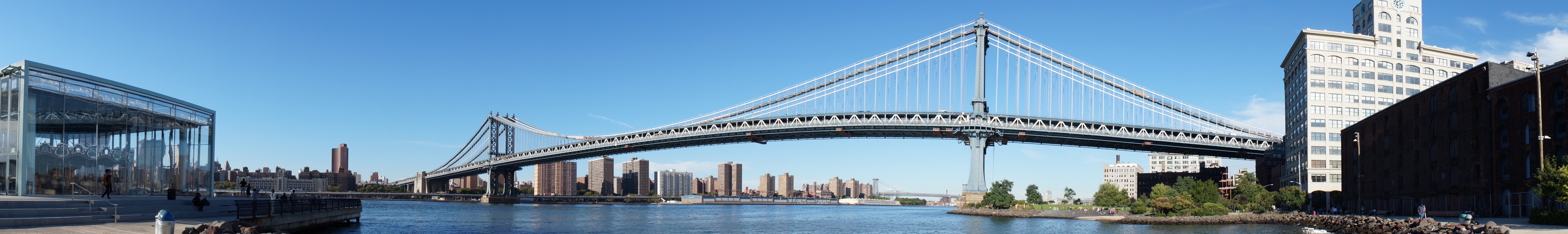
Manhattan Bridge seen from Brooklyn Bridge Park

== Partnerships with districts of foreign cities ==
- Anzio, Lazio, Italy (since 1990)
- Huế, Vietnam
- Gdynia, Poland (since 1991)
- Beşiktaş, Istanbul Province, Turkey (since 2005)
- Leopoldstadt, Vienna, Austria (since 2007)
- London Borough of Lambeth, United Kingdom
- Bnei Brak, Israel
- Konak, İzmir, Turkey (since 2010)
- Chaoyang District, Beijing, China (since 2014)
- Yiwu, China (since 2014)
- Üsküdar, Istanbul, Turkey (since 2015)

== Hospitals and healthcare ==
- Brookdale University Hospital and Medical Center
- Kings County Hospital Center
- Maimonides Medical Center
- Mount Sinai Brooklyn
- New York Community Hospital
- NYC Health + Hospitals/Kings County
- NYU Langone Hospital – Brooklyn
- SUNY Downstate Medical Center

== See also ==
=== General links ===
- List of tallest buildings in Brooklyn
- National Register of Historic Places listings in Kings County, New York
- USS Brooklyn, 3 ships

=== History of neighborhoods ===
- Bedford–Stuyvesant
- Bushwick
- Canarsie
- Coney Island
- Crown Heights
- East Williamsburg
- Flatbush
- Gravesend
- Greenpoint
- New Utrecht
- Park Slope
- Williamsburg

=== General history ===
- Brooklyn Visual Heritage
- History of New York City
- List of former municipalities in New York City
- Timeline of Brooklyn history
