= 1940 United States presidential election in New York =

- November 5, 1940
- Turnout: 75.7% ▲3.1 pp

| Nominee | Franklin D. Roosevelt | Wendell Willkie |
| Party | Democratic | Republican |
| Alliance | American Labor |
| Home state | New York | New York |
| Running mate | Henry A. Wallace | Charles L. McNary |
| Electoral vote | 47 | 0 |
| Popular vote | 3,251,918 | 3,027,478 |
| Percentage | 51.50% | 47.95% |
County results
Roosevelt
50–60%
60–70%
Willkie
50–60%
60–70%
70–80%
President before election
Franklin D. Roosevelt
Democratic
Elected President
Franklin D. Roosevelt
Democratic

The 1940 United States presidential election in New York took place on November 5, 1940. All contemporary 48 states were part of the 1940 United States presidential election. Voters had chosen 47 electors to the Electoral College, which selected the president and vice president.

Pro-Roosevelt advertisement near Radio City Music Hall, 1940, with slogan "Free Democracy Rule."

New York was won by incumbent Democratic President Franklin D. Roosevelt of New York, who was running against Republican businessman Wendell Willkie of New York. Roosevelt ran with Henry A. Wallace of Iowa, and Willkie ran with Senator Charles L. McNary of Oregon. A former Governor of New York who had easily carried the state in his previous two presidential campaigns, Franklin Roosevelt again won New York State in 1940, but by a much closer margin. Roosevelt took 51.50% of the vote versus Wendell Willkie's 47.95%, a margin of 3.55%. This is the only one of his four elections in which New York was decided by less than 5%.

New York weighed in for this election as 6% more Republican than the national average. The presidential election of 1940 was a very partisan election for New York, with 99.45% of the electorate casting votes for either the Democratic Party or the Republican Party. In typical form for the time, the highly populated centers of New York City, Albany, Buffalo, and Rochester voted primarily Democratic, while the majority of smaller counties in New York turned out for Willkie as the Republican candidate. Much of Roosevelt's margin of victory was provided by his dominance in New York City. Roosevelt took over 60% of the vote in Manhattan, Brooklyn, and the Bronx, and decisively won New York City as a whole.

However, the boroughs of Queens and Staten Island flipped to the Republican side in 1940 after voting for FDR in 1932 and 1936, a major contributing factor as to why the race was much closer than the 20-point margin that FDR had won the state by in 1936, along with Willkie also winning the counties of Schenectady, Montgomery, Rockland and Sullivan, all of which Roosevelt had won in 1936. This was the first time since 1836 that a Democrat won the presidency without carrying Staten Island.

== Primaries ==
=== American Labor Party ===
Members of the Communist Party USA started joining the American Labor Party and Israel Amter, chair of the Communist Party, called for the "building of the American Labor Party". Communists in the ALP opposed reelecting Roosevelt in the 1940 election and the party's leadership started an attempt to remove them from the party. Fights broke out at the convention on September 14, 1940, where Roosevelt was given the nomination despite an attempted resolution condemning Roosevelt.

1940 American Labor Party presidential ballot
| Party | Candidate | Votes | % | ±% |
|---|---|---|---|---|
| American Labor | Franklin D. Roosevelt | 442 | 64.34% | |
| American Labor | No candidate | 234 | 34.06% | |
| American Labor | Norman Thomas | 11 | 1.60% | |
| Total votes | | 687 | 100.00% | |

== Results ==
1940 United States presidential election in New York
| Party | Candidate | Votes | Percentage | Electoral votes |
|---|---|---|---|---|
| Democratic | Franklin D. Roosevelt | 2,834,500 | 44.98% | |
| American Labor | Franklin D. Roosevelt | 417,418 | 6.62% | |
| Total | Franklin D. Roosevelt (incumbent) | 3,251,918 | 51.50% | 47 |
| Republican | Wendell Willkie | 3,027,478 | 47.95% | 0 |
| Socialist | Norman Thomas | 18,950 | 0.30% | 0 |
| Communist | Earl Browder | 11,289 | 0.18% | 0 |
| Prohibition | Roger Babson | 3,250 | 0.05% | 0 |
| N/A | Others | 1,012 | 0.02% | 0 |
| Totals | | 6,313,897 | 100.0% | 47 |

=== New York City results ===
| 1940 Presidential Election in New York City | | Manhattan | The Bronx | Brooklyn | Queens | Staten Island | Total | |
| Democratic- American Labor | Franklin D. Roosevelt | 478,153 | 418,931 | 742,668 | 288,024 | 38,307 | 1,966,083 | 60.69% |
| Democratic- American Labor | Franklin D. Roosevelt | 61.45% | 67.11% | 64.83% | 46.91% | 49.45% | 1,966,083 | 60.69% |
| Republican | Wendell Willkie | 292,480 | 198,293 | 394,534 | 323,406 | 38,911 | 1,247,624 | 38.52% |
| Republican | Wendell Willkie | 37.59% | 31.77% | 34.44% | 52.68% | 50.23% | 1,247,624 | 38.52% |
| Socialist | Norman Thomas | 3,496 | 2,990 | 3,951 | 1,749 | 208 | 12,394 | 0.38% |
| Socialist | Norman Thomas | 1.48% | 1.30% | 1.20% | 1.69% | 1.62% | 12,394 | 0.38% |
| Prohibition | Roger Babson | 378 | 304 | 460 | 153 | 22 | 1,317 | 0.04% |
| Prohibition | Roger Babson | 0.05% | 0.05% | 0.04% | 0.02% | 0.03% | 1,317 | 0.04% |
| TOTAL | | 778,099 | 624,204 | 1,145,567 | 613,954 | 77,467 | 3,239,291 | 100.00% |

=== Results by county ===
| County | Franklin D. Roosevelt Democratic/American Labor | | Wendell Willkie Republican | | Various candidates Other parties | | Margin | | Total votes cast |
| County | # | % | # | % | # | % | # | % | Total votes cast |
|---|---|---|---|---|---|---|---|---|---|
| Albany | 77,052 | 56.58% | 58,912 | 43.26% | 210 | 0.15% | 18,140 | 13.32% | 136,174 |
| Allegany | 5,077 | 24.45% | 15,611 | 75.17% | 79 | 0.38% | -10,534 | -50.72% | 20,767 |
| Bronx | 418,931 | 67.11% | 198,293 | 31.77% | 6,980 | 1.12% | 220,638 | 35.35% | 624,204 |
| Broome | 32,092 | 42.07% | 44,013 | 57.70% | 179 | 0.23% | -11,921 | -15.63% | 76,284 |
| Cattaraugus | 11,924 | 34.02% | 22,987 | 65.57% | 144 | 0.41% | -11,063 | -31.56% | 35,055 |
| Cayuga | 13,985 | 39.76% | 21,032 | 59.80% | 156 | 0.44% | -7,047 | -20.04% | 35,173 |
| Chautauqua | 21,524 | 37.55% | 35,536 | 62.00% | 256 | 0.45% | -14,012 | -24.45% | 57,316 |
| Chemung | 15,203 | 40.54% | 22,156 | 59.08% | 140 | 0.37% | -6,953 | -18.54% | 37,499 |
| Chenango | 5,241 | 26.94% | 14,168 | 72.84% | 43 | 0.22% | -8,927 | -45.89% | 19,452 |
| Clinton | 11,378 | 52.19% | 10,369 | 47.56% | 53 | 0.24% | 1,009 | 4.63% | 21,800 |
| Columbia | 8,591 | 38.76% | 13,527 | 61.04% | 44 | 0.20% | -4,936 | -22.27% | 22,162 |
| Cortland | 5,147 | 29.56% | 12,233 | 70.26% | 31 | 0.18% | -7,086 | -40.70% | 17,411 |
| Delaware | 5,968 | 27.50% | 15,684 | 72.28% | 48 | 0.22% | -9,716 | -44.77% | 21,700 |
| Dutchess | 25,598 | 44.10% | 32,329 | 55.69% | 122 | 0.21% | -6,731 | -11.60% | 58,049 |
| Erie | 189,779 | 50.68% | 183,664 | 49.05% | 992 | 0.26% | 6,115 | 1.63% | 374,435 |
| Essex | 5,545 | 31.77% | 11,868 | 68.01% | 38 | 0.22% | -6,323 | -36.23% | 17,451 |
| Franklin | 9,479 | 45.23% | 11,446 | 54.61% | 33 | 0.16% | -1,967 | -9.39% | 20,958 |
| Fulton | 9,040 | 37.64% | 14,896 | 62.03% | 79 | 0.33% | -5,856 | -24.38% | 24,015 |
| Genesee | 6,664 | 31.39% | 14,503 | 68.32% | 62 | 0.29% | -7,839 | -36.93% | 21,229 |
| Greene | 6,425 | 38.67% | 10,153 | 61.10% | 38 | 0.23% | -3,728 | -22.44% | 16,616 |
| Hamilton | 840 | 29.24% | 2,029 | 70.62% | 4 | 0.14% | -1,189 | -41.39% | 2,873 |
| Herkimer | 13,013 | 42.45% | 17,590 | 57.38% | 54 | 0.18% | -4,577 | -14.93% | 30,657 |
| Jefferson | 14,581 | 36.22% | 25,584 | 63.54% | 97 | 0.24% | -11,003 | -27.33% | 40,262 |
| Kings | 742,668 | 64.83% | 394,534 | 34.44% | 8,365 | 0.73% | 348,134 | 30.39% | 1,145,567 |
| Lewis | 3,466 | 30.06% | 8,049 | 69.80% | 17 | 0.15% | -4,583 | -39.74% | 11,532 |
| Livingston | 6,397 | 33.52% | 12,629 | 66.18% | 58 | 0.30% | -6,232 | -32.66% | 19,084 |
| Madison | 6,301 | 29.09% | 15,262 | 70.46% | 99 | 0.46% | -8,961 | -41.37% | 21,662 |
| Monroe | 120,613 | 51.09% | 114,383 | 48.45% | 1,099 | 0.47% | 6,230 | 2.64% | 236,095 |
| Montgomery | 15,079 | 49.18% | 15,546 | 50.71% | 34 | 0.11% | -467 | -1.52% | 30,659 |
| Nassau | 73,171 | 33.67% | 143,672 | 66.12% | 450 | 0.21% | -70,501 | -32.45% | 217,293 |
| New York | 478,153 | 61.45% | 292,480 | 37.59% | 7,466 | 0.96% | 185,673 | 23.86% | 778,099 |
| Niagara | 33,207 | 47.37% | 36,729 | 52.39% | 165 | 0.24% | -3,522 | -5.02% | 70,101 |
| Oneida | 49,109 | 48.27% | 52,362 | 51.47% | 271 | 0.27% | -3,253 | -3.20% | 101,742 |
| Onondaga | 67,481 | 42.44% | 91,056 | 57.26% | 485 | 0.30% | -23,575 | -14.82% | 159,022 |
| Ontario | 9,110 | 32.35% | 18,932 | 67.23% | 120 | 0.43% | -9,822 | -34.88% | 28,162 |
| Orange | 27,632 | 41.43% | 38,913 | 58.35% | 145 | 0.22% | -11,281 | -16.92% | 66,690 |
| Orleans | 4,525 | 29.16% | 10,958 | 70.61% | 36 | 0.23% | -6,433 | -41.45% | 15,519 |
| Oswego | 13,459 | 37.15% | 22,688 | 62.62% | 83 | 0.23% | -9,229 | -25.47% | 36,230 |
| Otsego | 7,798 | 31.64% | 16,771 | 68.04% | 78 | 0.32% | -8,973 | -36.41% | 24,647 |
| Putnam | 4,794 | 39.96% | 7,164 | 59.71% | 39 | 0.33% | -2,370 | -19.75% | 11,997 |
| Queens | 288,024 | 46.91% | 323,406 | 52.68% | 2,524 | 0.41% | -35,382 | -5.76% | 613,954 |
| Rensselaer | 32,387 | 44.90% | 39,648 | 54.97% | 97 | 0.13% | -7,261 | -10.07% | 72,132 |
| Richmond | 38,307 | 49.45% | 38,911 | 50.23% | 249 | 0.32% | -604 | -0.78% | 77,467 |
| Rockland | 14,897 | 42.20% | 20,040 | 56.77% | 362 | 1.03% | -5,143 | -14.57% | 35,299 |
| Saratoga | 15,037 | 41.27% | 21,298 | 58.46% | 98 | 0.27% | -6,261 | -17.18% | 36,433 |
| Schenectady | 32,041 | 48.20% | 34,101 | 51.30% | 334 | 0.50% | -2,060 | -3.10% | 66,476 |
| Schoharie | 4,073 | 35.68% | 7,316 | 64.10% | 25 | 0.22% | -3,243 | -28.41% | 11,414 |
| Schuyler | 2,211 | 30.83% | 4,936 | 68.83% | 24 | 0.33% | -2,725 | -38.00% | 7,171 |
| Seneca | 4,203 | 33.36% | 8,364 | 66.39% | 31 | 0.25% | -4,161 | -33.03% | 12,598 |
| St. Lawrence | 15,569 | 38.93% | 24,339 | 60.86% | 82 | 0.21% | -8,770 | -21.93% | 39,990 |
| Steuben | 14,651 | 34.58% | 27,587 | 65.12% | 127 | 0.30% | -12,936 | -30.53% | 42,365 |
| Suffolk | 33,853 | 34.60% | 63,712 | 65.12% | 270 | 0.28% | -29,859 | -30.52% | 97,835 |
| Sullivan | 9,785 | 45.01% | 11,877 | 54.64% | 76 | 0.35% | -2,092 | -9.62% | 21,738 |
| Tioga | 4,081 | 29.66% | 9,618 | 69.91% | 59 | 0.43% | -5,537 | -40.25% | 13,758 |
| Tompkins | 7,118 | 32.81% | 14,325 | 66.04% | 250 | 1.15% | -7,207 | -33.22% | 21,693 |
| Ulster | 20,403 | 42.78% | 27,186 | 57.00% | 107 | 0.22% | -6,783 | -14.22% | 47,696 |
| Warren | 7,226 | 34.54% | 13,657 | 65.27% | 40 | 0.19% | -6,431 | -30.74% | 20,923 |
| Washington | 7,977 | 33.27% | 15,960 | 66.57% | 38 | 0.16% | -7,983 | -33.30% | 23,975 |
| Wayne | 7,358 | 27.65% | 19,196 | 72.12% | 62 | 0.23% | -11,838 | -44.48% | 26,616 |
| Westchester | 110,114 | 37.49% | 182,883 | 62.27% | 694 | 0.24% | -72,769 | -24.78% | 293,691 |
| Wyoming | 4,393 | 27.88% | 11,323 | 71.87% | 39 | 0.25% | -6,930 | -43.99% | 15,755 |
| Yates | 2,170 | 23.40% | 7,084 | 76.38% | 21 | 0.23% | -4,914 | -52.98% | 9,275 |
| Totals | 3,251,918 | 51.50% | 3,027,478 | 47.95% | 34,501 | 0.55% | 224,440 | 3.55% | 6,313,897 |

==== Counties that flipped from Democratic to Republican ====
- Richmond (Staten Island)
- Queens
- Rockland
- Montgomery
- Schenectady
- Sullivan

== See also ==
- United States presidential elections in New York
- Presidency of Franklin D. Roosevelt

== Works cited ==
- Soyer, Daniel (2021). Left in the Center: The Liberal Party of New York and the Rise and Fall of American Social Democracy. Cornell University Press. ISBN 9781501759888. JSTOR 10.7591/j.ctv1hw3x50.2.
