= 1840 United States presidential election in New York =

- November 2–4, 1840
- Turnout: 91.9% ▲21.4 pp
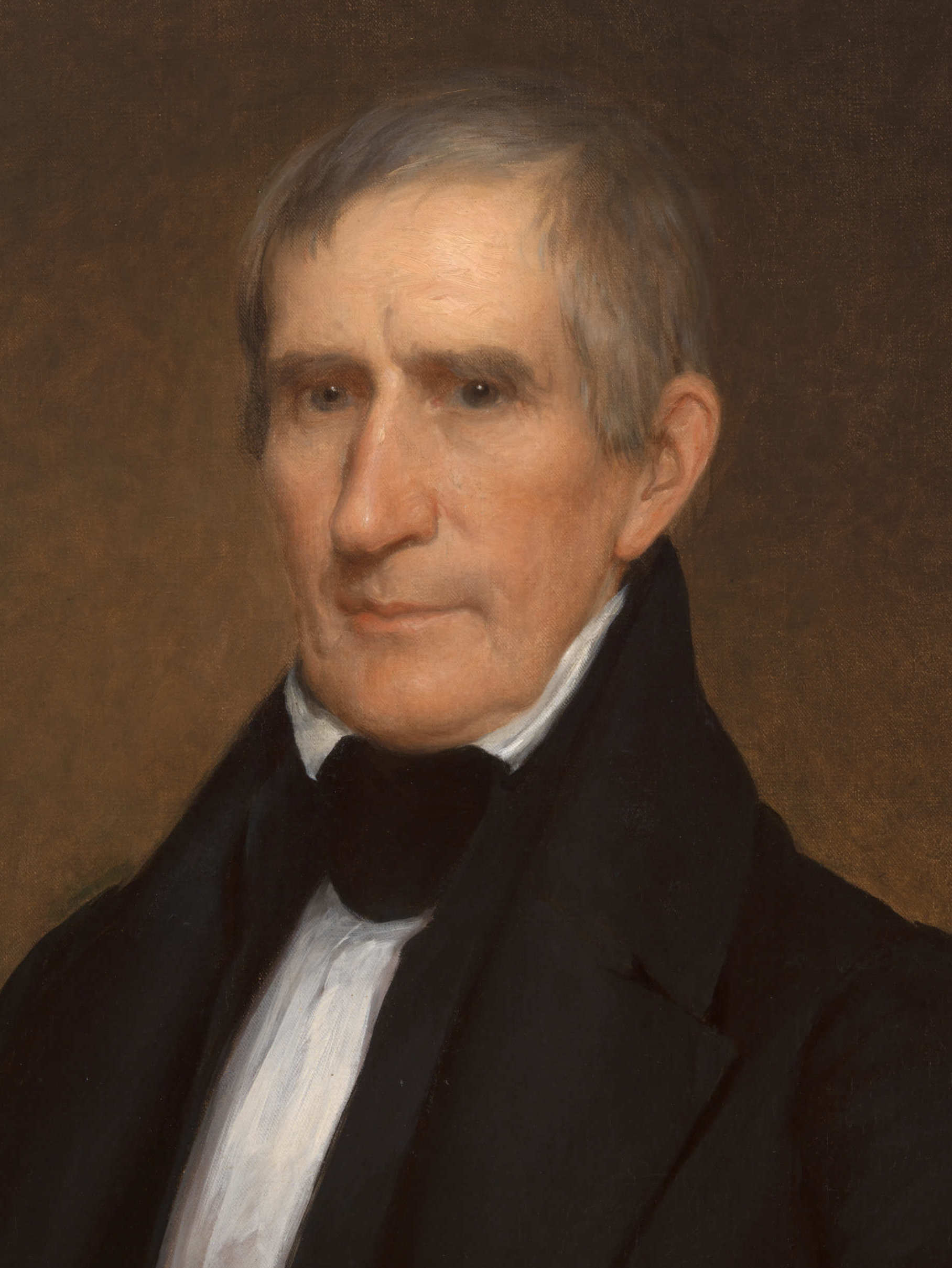

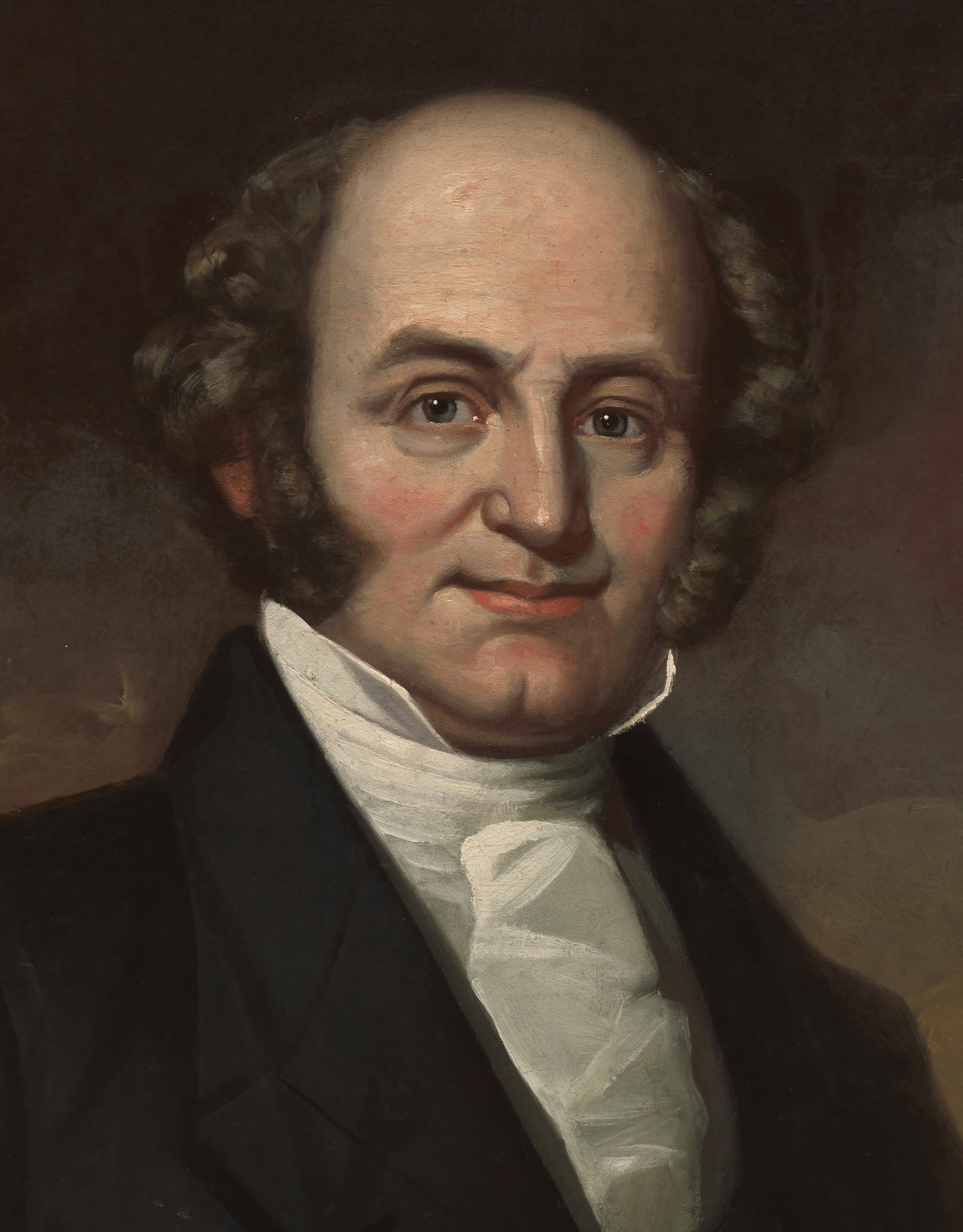
Nominee	William Henry Harrison	Martin Van Buren
Party	Whig	Democratic
Home state	Ohio	New York
Running mate	John Tyler	none
Electoral vote	42	0
Popular vote	225,817	212,528
Percentage	51.19%	48.18%
County results
Harrison
40–50%
50–60%
60–70%
Van Buren
40–50%
50–60%
60–70%
70–80%
President before election
Martin Van Buren
Democratic
Elected President
William Henry Harrison
Whig

A presidential election was held in New York from November 2–4, 1840 as part of the 1840 United States presidential election. Voters chose 42 representatives, or electors to the Electoral College, who voted for President and Vice President.

New York voted for the Whig candidate, William Henry Harrison, over Democratic candidate Martin Van Buren. Harrison won New York by a narrow margin of 3.00%.

== Results ==
1840 United States presidential election in New York (Note: Since New York voted for presidential electors directly, the totals below are based on the highest elector on each ticket.)
Party	Candidate	Running mate	Popular vote		Electoral vote	
Party	Candidate	Running mate	Count	%	Count	%
Whig	William Henry Harrison of Ohio	John Tyler of Virginia	225,817	51.19%	42	100.00%
Democratic	Martin Van Buren of New York	Richard Mentor Johnson of Kentucky	212,528	48.18%	0	0.00%
Liberty	James G. Birney of New York	Thomas Earle of Pennsylvania	2,799	0.63%	0	0.00%
Total			441,144	100.00%	42	100.00%

=== Results by county ===
County	William Henry Harrison Whig		Martin Van Buren Democratic		James G. Birney Liberty		Margin		Total votes cast
County	#	%	#	%	#	%	#	%	Total votes cast
Albany	6,371	51.55%	5,944	48.09%	45	0.36%	427	3.45%	12,360
Allegany	4,132	54.43%	3,381	44.53%	79	1.04%	751	9.89%	7,592
Broome	2,395	52.67%	2,131	46.87%	21	0.46%	264	5.81%	4,547
Cattaraugus	2,966	53.88%	2,475	44.96%	64	1.16%	491	8.92%	5,505
Cayuga	5,172	51.17%	4,863	48.11%	73	0.72%	309	3.06%	10,108
Chautauqua	5,985	63.99%	3,345	35.76%	23	0.25%	2,640	28.23%	9,353
Chemung	1,698	42.51%	2,296	57.49%	0	0.00%	-598	-14.97%	3,994
Chenango	4,386	52.18%	3,995	47.53%	25	0.30%	391	4.65%	8,406
Clinton	2,023	52.11%	1,828	47.09%	31	0.80%	195	5.02%	3,882
Columbia	4,290	48.89%	4,489	51.05%	5	0.06%	-189	-2.15%	8,774
Cortland	2,664	53.96%	2,229	45.15%	44	0.89%	435	8.81%	4,937
Delaware	2,988	43.45%	3,847	55.94%	42	0.61%	-859	-12.49%	6,877
Dutchess	5,355	49.89%	5,362	49.96%	16	0.15%	-7	-0.07%	10,733
Erie	6,787	64.58%	3,687	35.08%	36	0.34%	3,100	29.50%	10,510
Essex	2,617	59.38%	1,789	40.59%	1	0.02%	828	18.79%	4,407
Franklin	1,440	56.34%	1,110	43.43%	6	0.23%	330	12.91%	2,556
Fulton (Note: Includes Hamilton County)	2,087	52.40%	1,867	46.87%	29	0.73%	220	5.52%	3,983
Genesee	7,057	64.03%	3,808	34.55%	156	1.42%	3,249	29.48%	11,021
Greene	2,990	47.80%	3,258	52.09%	7	0.11%	-268	-4.28%	6,255
Herkimer	3,118	41.36%	4,350	57.71%	70	0.93%	-1,232	-16.34%	7,538
Jefferson	6,257	52.38%	5,630	47.13%	59	0.49%	627	5.25%	11,946
Kings	3,293	50.87%	3,157	48.77%	23	0.36%	136	2.10%	6,473
Lewis	1,718	48.95%	1,755	50.00%	37	1.05%	-37	-1.05%	3,510
Livingston	3,916	59.32%	2,634	39.90%	52	0.79%	1,282	19.42%	6,602
Madison	4,266	49.48%	4,115	47.73%	240	2.78%	151	1.75%	8,621
Monroe	6,468	56.84%	4,835	42.49%	77	0.68%	1,633	14.35%	11,380
Montgomery	2,828	46.10%	3,298	53.76%	9	0.15%	-470	-7.66%	6,135
New York	20,961	48.69%	21,936	50.95%	153	0.36%	-975	-2.26%	43,050
Niagara	2,964	56.40%	2,219	42.23%	72	1.37%	745	14.18%	5,255
Oneida	7,156	46.72%	7,769	50.72%	393	2.57%	-613	-4.00%	15,318
Onondaga	6,557	49.58%	6,562	49.62%	105	0.79%	-5	-0.04%	13,224
Ontario	4,828	57.26%	3,451	40.93%	152	1.80%	1,377	16.33%	8,431
Orange	4,371	47.41%	4,845	52.55%	3	0.03%	-474	-5.14%	9,219
Orleans	2,606	55.28%	2,031	43.08%	77	1.63%	575	12.20%	4,714
Oswego	4,192	50.72%	3,907	47.27%	166	2.01%	285	3.45%	8,265
Otsego	4,856	46.27%	5,580	53.16%	60	0.57%	-724	-6.90%	10,496
Putnam	920	36.76%	1,583	63.24%	0	0.00%	-663	-26.49%	2,503
Queens	2,522	49.70%	2,550	50.26%	2	0.04%	-28	-0.55%	5,074
Rensselaer	5,751	51.31%	5,424	48.39%	33	0.29%	327	2.92%	11,208
Richmond	903	51.19%	861	48.81%	0	0.00%	42	2.38%	1,764
Rockland	637	27.77%	1,657	72.23%	0	0.00%	-1,020	-44.46%	2,294
Saratoga	4,416	53.17%	3,873	46.63%	16	0.19%	543	6.54%	8,305
Schenectady	1,752	52.52%	1,579	47.33%	5	0.15%	173	5.19%	3,336
Schoharie	2,692	45.98%	3,137	53.58%	26	0.44%	-445	-7.60%	5,855
Seneca	2,466	49.81%	2,472	49.93%	13	0.26%	-6	-0.12%	4,951
St. Lawrence	4,803	50.06%	4,751	49.52%	41	0.43%	52	0.54%	9,595
Steuben	4,081	45.63%	4,820	53.90%	42	0.47%	-739	-8.26%	8,943
Suffolk	2,415	40.95%	3,482	59.05%	0	0.00%	-1,067	18.09%	5,897
Sullivan	1,475	46.63%	1,679	53.08%	9	0.28%	-204	-6.45%	3,163
Tioga	1,925	46.84%	2,180	53.04%	5	0.12%	-255	-6.20%	4,110
Tompkins	3,969	52.51%	3,558	47.07%	32	0.42%	411	5.44%	7,559
Ulster	4,492	51.20%	4,280	48.78%	2	0.02%	212	2.42%	8,774
Warren	1,306	47.98%	1,411	51.84%	5	0.18%	-105	-3.86%	2,722
Washington	5,070	62.42%	3,024	37.23%	28	0.34%	2,046	25.19%	8,122
Wayne	4,309	51.65%	3,998	47.92%	36	0.43%	311	3.73%	8,343
Westchester	4,083	48.34%	4,354	51.55%	9	0.11%	-271	-3.21%	8,446
Yates	2,072	49.30%	2,087	49.66%	44	1.05%	-15	-0.36%	4,203
Total	225,817	51.19%	212,528	48.18%	2,799	0.63%	13,289	3.01%	441,144

==== Counties that flipped from Democratic to Whig ====
- Albany
- Broome
- Cattaraugus
- Cayuga
- Chenango
- Clinton
- Jefferson
- Kings
- Madison
- Oswego
- Rensselaer
- Richmond (Note: Relative to 1832, was tied in 1836.)
- Saratoga
- Schenectady
- St. Lawrence
- Tompkins
- Ulster
- Wayne

== See also ==
- United States presidential elections in New York
