= 1888 United States presidential election in New York =

- November 6, 1888
- Turnout: 92.3% ▲4.8 pp
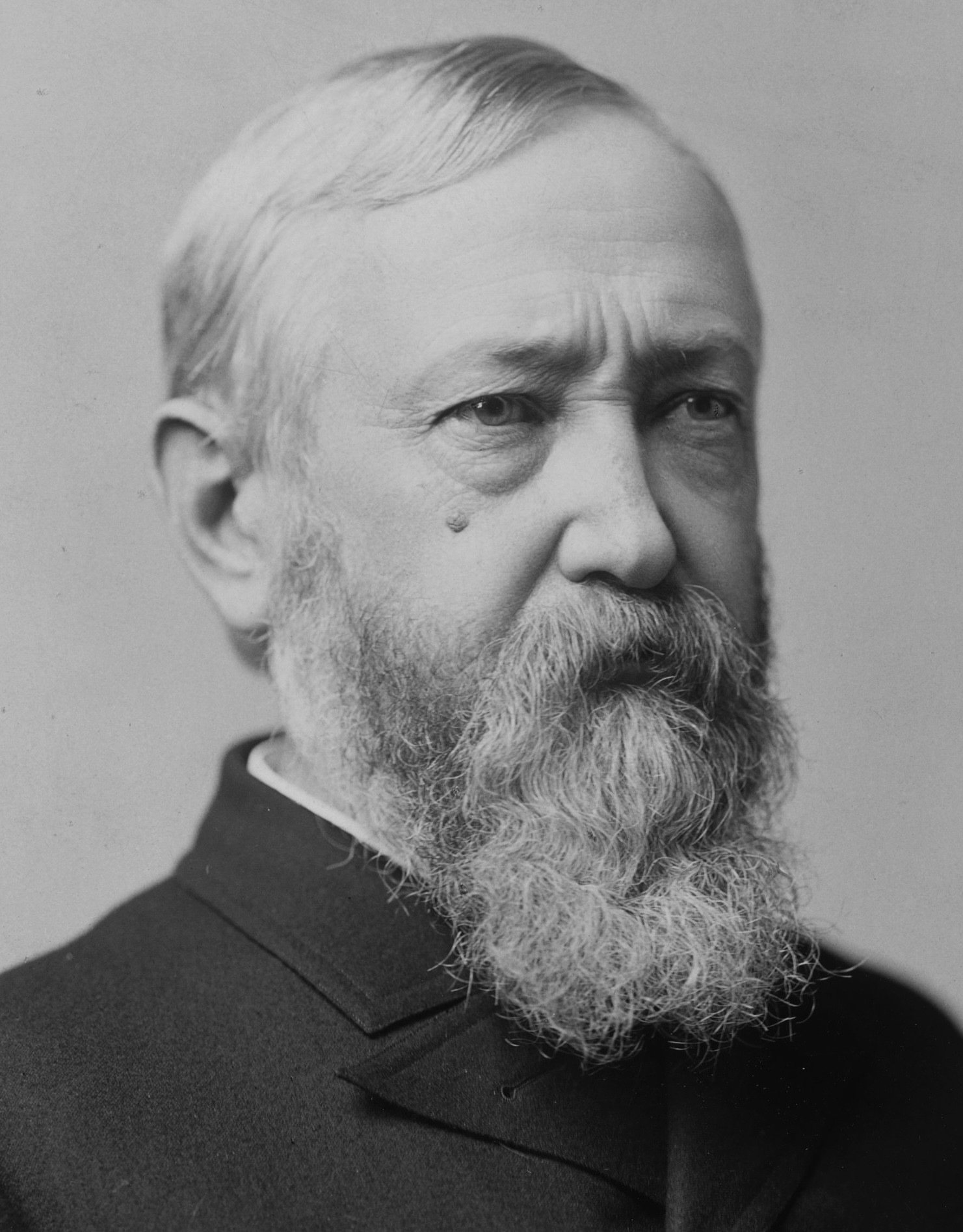

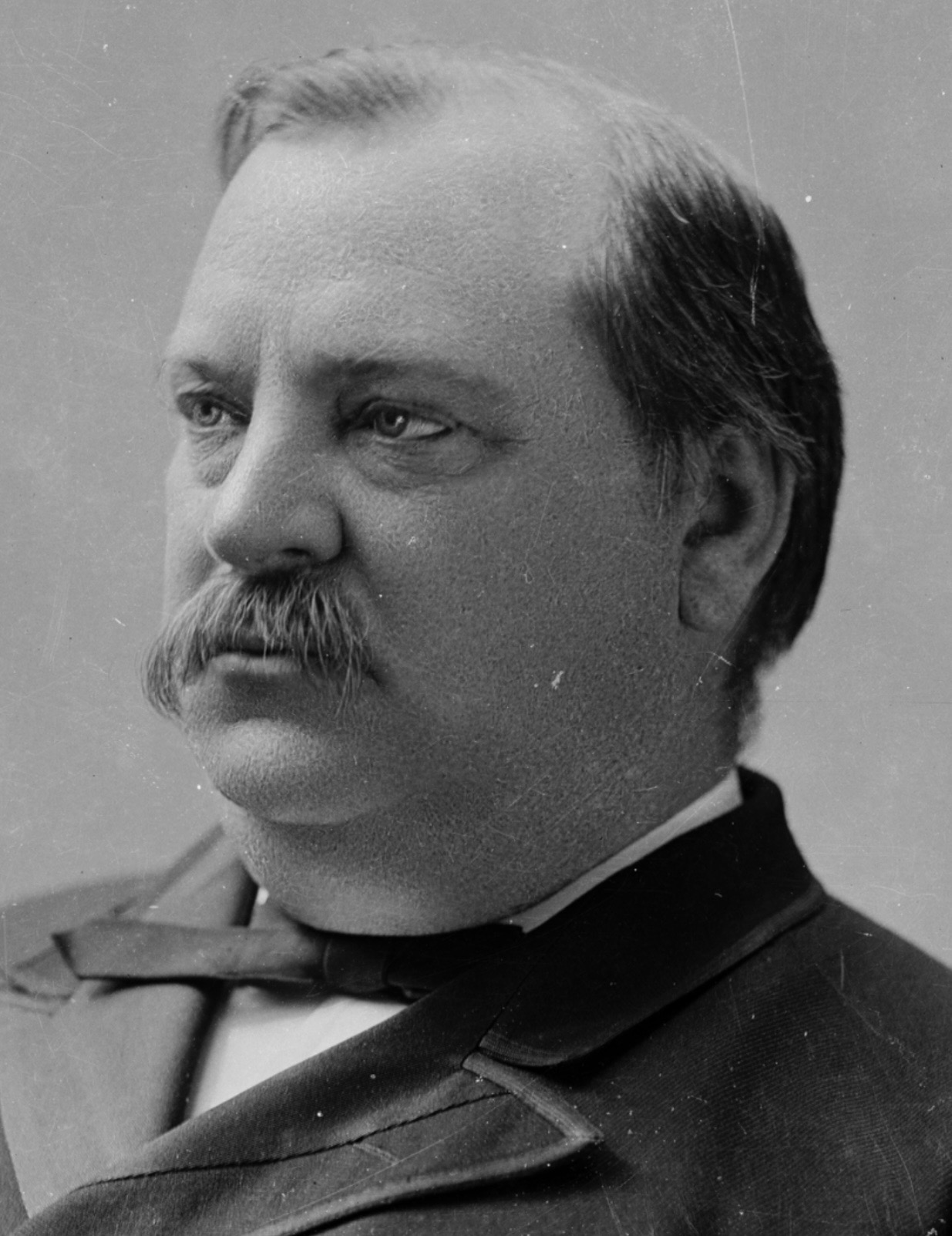
Nominee	Benjamin Harrison	Grover Cleveland
Party	Republican	Democratic
Home state	Indiana	New York
Running mate	Levi P. Morton	Allen G. Thurman
Electoral vote	36	0
Popular vote	650,338	635,965
Percentage	49.28%	48.19%
County results
Harrison
40–50%
50–60%
60–70%
Cleveland
40–50%
50–60%
President before election
Grover Cleveland
Democratic
Elected President
Benjamin Harrison
Republican

The 1888 United States presidential election in New York took place on November 6, 1888. All contemporary 38 states were part of the 1888 United States presidential election. Voters chose 36 electors to the Electoral College, which selected the president and vice president.

New York was won by the Republican nominees, former Senator Benjamin Harrison of Indiana and his running mate former Congressman Levi P. Morton of New York. Harrison and Morton defeated the Democratic nominees, incumbent President Grover Cleveland of New York and his running mate former Senator Allen G. Thurman of Ohio.

Harrison narrowly carried New York State with a plurality of 49.28% of the vote to Cleveland's 48.19%, a victory margin of 1.09%. In a distant third came the Prohibition Party candidate Clinton B. Fisk with 2.29%.

New York weighed in for this election as less than 2% more Republican than the national average.

Cleveland's narrow defeat in his home state, losing its 36 electoral votes, ultimately cost him the 1888 election, despite the fact that Cleveland won the nationwide popular vote by nearly a point. Cleveland had narrowly won New York State four years earlier in his initial 1884 presidential campaign, but strong opposition to Cleveland from the corrupt Tammany Hall machine, which held significant influence over New York's politics, helped to narrowly tip the state to Harrison in 1888. Had Cleveland instead won New York, he would have won reelection by seven electoral votes.

Cleveland performed most strongly downstate in the New York City area, where he won New York County, Kings County, Queens County, and Richmond County. Cleveland also won nearby Westchester County and Rockland County. Harrison, however, dominated in much of upstate New York, including a victory in Erie County, home to the city of Buffalo, although Cleveland did win Albany County, home to the state capital of Albany, along with several rural upstate counties.

== Results ==
1888 United States presidential election in New York
Party	Candidate	Votes	Percentage	Electoral votes
Republican	Benjamin Harrison	650,338	49.28%	36
Democratic	Grover Cleveland	635,965	48.19%	0
Prohibition	Clinton B. Fisk	30,231	2.29%	0
Socialist Labor	Unpledged electors	2,068	0.16%	0
Union Labor	Alson Streeter	627	0.05%	0
United Labor	Robert H. Cowdrey	519	0.04%	0
Totals		1,319,748	100.0%	36

=== County results ===
County	Benjamin Harrison Republican		Grover Cleveland Democratic		Clinton B. Fisk Prohibition		Unpledged Socialist Labor		Alson Streeter Union Labor		Robert H. Cowdrey United Labor		Margin		Total votes cast
County	#	%	#	%	#	%	#	%	#	%	#	%	#	%	Total votes cast
Albany	19,362	47.39%	21,037	51.49%	408	1.00%	27	0.07%	0	0.00%	19	0.05%	-1,675	-4.10%	40,853
Allegany	7,067	58.37%	3,625	29.94%	1,174	9.70%	0	0.00%	241	1.99%	0	0.00%	3,442	28.43%	12,107
Broome	8,405	53.70%	6,447	41.19%	796	5.09%	0	0.00%	1	0.01%	4	0.03%	1,958	12.51%	15,653
Cattaraugus	8,586	54.57%	6,173	39.23%	857	5.45%	0	0.00%	79	0.50%	39	0.25%	2,413	15.34%	15,734
Cayuga	9,646	57.78%	6,380	38.22%	626	3.75%	0	0.00%	42	0.25%	0	0.00%	3,266	19.56%	16,694
Chautauqua	12,108	62.92%	6,178	32.10%	893	4.64%	2	0.01%	57	0.30%	6	0.03%	5,930	30.81%	19,244
Chemung	5,467	45.95%	6,037	50.74%	376	3.16%	1	0.01%	13	0.13%	2	0.02%	-570	-4.79%	11,898
Chenango	5,798	52.49%	4,640	42.01%	605	5.48%	0	0.00%	3	0.03%	0	0.00%	1,158	10.48%	11,046
Clinton	6,271	56.72%	4,724	42.73%	61	0.55%	0	0.00%	0	0.00%	0	0.00%	1,547	13.99%	11,056
Columbia	6,447	50.46%	6,037	47.25%	292	2.29%	0	0.00%	0	0.00%	0	0.00%	410	3.21%	12,776
Cortland	4,732	55.97%	3,163	37.41%	555	6.56%	0	0.00%	5	0.06%	0	0.00%	1,569	18.56%	8,455
Delaware	6,602	52.33%	5,332	42.26%	677	5.37%	0	0.00%	6	0.05%	0	0.00%	1,270	10.07%	12,617
Dutchess	10,265	50.95%	9,249	45.91%	634	3.15%	0	0.00%	0	0.00%	0	0.00%	1,016	5.04%	20,148
Erie	31,612	51.06%	29,543	47.71%	735	1.19%	11	0.02%	14	0.02%	2	0.00%	2,069	3.34%	61,917
Essex	5,043	62.28%	2,930	36.19%	124	1.53%	0	0.00%	0	0.00%	0	0.00%	2,113	26.10%	8,097
Franklin	5,757	64.79%	3,028	34.08%	101	1.14%	0	0.00%	0	0.00%	0	0.00%	2,729	30.71%	8,886
Fulton	5,254	54.27%	4,043	41.76%	381	3.94%	2	0.02%	0	0.00%	1	0.01%	1,21	12.51%	9,681
Genesee	4,952	55.07%	3,633	40.40%	408	4.54%	0	0.00%	0	0.00%	0	0.00%	1,319	14.67%	8,993
Greene	4,460	48.27%	4,494	48.64%	284	3.07%	0	0.00%	0	0.00%	2	0.02%	-34	-0.37%	9,240
Hamilton (Note: Voted with Fulton County)	638	51.29%	591	47.51%	15	1.21%	0	0.00%	0	0.00%	0	0.00%	47	3.78%	1,244
Herkimer	6,683	52.87%	5,611	44.39%	341	2.70%	0	0.00%	0	0.00%	5	0.04%	1,072	8.48%	12,640
Jefferson	9,861	54.37%	7,562	41.70%	702	3.87%	0	0.00%	11	0.06%	0	0.00%	2,299	12.68%	18,136
Kings	70,052	45.49%	82,507	53.58%	1,116	0.72%	160	0.10%	0	0.00%	154	0.10%	-12,455	-8.09%	153,989
Lewis	4,369	52.33%	3,807	45.60%	172	2.06%	1	0.01%	0	0.00%	0	0.00%	562	6.73%	8,349
Livingston	5,584	54.80%	4,067	39.92%	531	5.21%	0	0.00%	7	0.07%	0	0.00%	1,517	14.89%	10,189
Madison	7,199	58.25%	4,641	37.55%	515	4.17%	3	0.02%	0	0.00%	1	0.01%	2,558	20.70%	12,359
Monroe	21,650	54.55%	16,677	42.02%	1,343	3.38%	12	0.03%	2	0.01%	4	0.01%	4,973	12.53%	39,688
Montgomery	6,365	52.18%	5,677	46.54%	149	1.22%	0	0.00%	0	0.00%	7	0.06%	688	5.64%	12,198
New York	106,922	39.20%	162,735	59.67%	1,126	0.41%	1,772	0.65%	0	0.00%	178	0.07%	-55,813	-20.46%	272,733
Niagara	6,886	49.19%	6,429	45.92%	682	4.87%	0	0.00%	2	0.01%	0	0.00%	457	3.26%	13,999
Oneida	16,241	51.78%	14,276	45.51%	846	2.70%	5	0.02%	0	0.00%	0	0.00%	1,965	6.26%	31,368
Onondaga	20,144	57.65%	14,001	40.07%	747	2.14%	49	0.14%	0	0.00%	0	0.00%	6,143	17.58%	34,941
Ontario	6,957	53.15%	5,753	43.95%	376	2.87%	0	0.00%	2	0.02%	1	0.01%	1,204	9.20%	13,089
Orange	11,261	49.49%	10,852	47.69%	637	2.80%	0	0.00%	0	0.00%	3	0.01%	409	1.80%	22,753
Orleans	4,277	51.98%	3,214	39.06%	734	8.92%	0	0.00%	3	0.04%	0	0.00%	1,063	12.92%	8,228
Oswego	11,296	58.37%	7,429	38.38%	625	3.23%	0	0.00%	1	0.01%	3	0.02%	3,867	19.98%	19,354
Otsego	7,829	50.95%	6,972	45.37%	563	3.66%	0	0.00%	2	0.01%	0	0.00%	857	5.58%	15,366
Putnam	2,098	56.37%	1,515	40.70%	109	2.93%	0	0.00%	0	0.00%	0	0.00%	583	15.66%	3,722
Queens	11,017	45.95%	12,683	52.90%	243	1.01%	16	0.07%	0	0.00%	16	0.07%	-1,666	-6.95%	23,975
Rensselaer	15,718	49.62%	15,410	48.65%	541	1.71%	0	0.00%	0	0.00%	8	0.03%	308	0.97%	31,677
Richmond	4,100	40.82%	5,764	57.39%	168	1.67%	0	0.00%	0	0.00%	11	0.11%	-1,664	-16.57%	10,043
Rockland	3,013	41.83%	3,939	54.69%	248	3.44%	0	0.00%	0	0.00%	3	0.04%	-926	-12.86%	7,203
Saratoga	8,594	54.36%	6,570	41.56%	646	4.09%	0	0.00%	0	0.00%	0	0.00%	2,024	12.80%	15,810
Schenectady	3,633	51.03%	3,328	46.75%	158	2.22%	0	0.00%	0	0.00%	0	0.00%	305	4.28%	7,119
Schoharie	3,696	41.36%	5,006	56.01%	223	2.50%	0	0.00%	12	0.13%	0	0.00%	-1,310	-14.66%	8,937
Schuyler	2,704	55.16%	1,975	40.29%	219	4.47%	0	0.00%	4	0.08%	0	0.00%	729	14.87%	4,902
Seneca	3,576	48.07%	3,705	49.81%	156	2.10%	0	0.00%	2	0.03%	0	0.00%	-129	-1.73%	7,439
St. Lawrence	14,611	67.56%	6,509	30.10%	506	2.34%	0	0.00%	2	0.01%	0	0.00%	8,102	37.46%	21,628
Steuben	11,637	53.10%	9,154	41.77%	1,106	5.05%	0	0.00%	8	0.04%	12	0.05%	2,483	11.33%	21,917
Suffolk	7,167	50.23%	6,600	46.26%	492	3.45%	5	0.04%	0	0.00%	3	0.02%	567	3.97%	14,267
Sullivan	3,860	49.66%	3,757	48.33%	156	2.01%	0	0.00%	0	0.00%	0	0.00%	103	1.33%	7,773
Tioga	4,852	54.69%	3,609	40.68%	381	4.29%	0	0.00%	30	0.34%	0	0.00%	1,243	14.01%	8,872
Tompkins	5,073	54.18%	3,909	41.75%	317	3.39%	2	0.02%	62	0.66%	0	0.00%	1,164	12.43%	9,363
Ulster	10,825	49.57%	10,487	48.02%	523	2.39%	0	0.00%	0	0.00%	3	0.01%	338	1.55%	21,838
Warren	4,135	56.39%	2,883	39.32%	314	4.28%	0	0.00%	0	0.00%	1	0.01%	1,252	17.07%	7,333
Washington	8,023	63.21%	4,284	33.75%	385	3.03%	0	0.00%	1	0.01%	0	0.00%	3,739	29.46%	12,693
Wayne	7,850	57.73%	5,120	37.65%	619	4.55%	0	0.00%	7	0.05%	2	0.01%	2,730	20.08%	13,598
Westchester	13,799	46.81%	14,948	50.71%	703	2.38%	0	0.00%	0	0.00%	29	0.10%	-1,149	-3.90%	29,479
Wyoming	4,899	57.04%	3,166	36.86%	524	6.10%	0	0.00%	0	0.00%	0	0.00%	1,733	20.18%	8,589
Yates	3,410	58.26%	2,150	36.73%	287	4.90%	0	0.00%	6	0.10%	0	0.00%	1,260	21.53%	5,853
Totals	650,338	49.28%	635,965	48.19%	30,231	2.29%	2,068	0.16%	627	0.05%	519	0.04%	14,373	1.09%	1,319,748

==== Counties that flipped from Democratic to Republican ====
- Hamilton
- Niagara
- Oneida
- Otsego
- Suffolk
- Sullivan

==== Counties that flipped from Republican to Democratic ====
- Chemung
- Greene

== See also ==
- United States presidential elections in New York
