= 1960 United States presidential election in New York =

- November 8, 1960
- Turnout: 66.9% ▼1.0 pp

Nominee	John F. Kennedy	Richard Nixon
Party	Democratic	Republican
Alliance	Liberal
Home state	Massachusetts	California
Running mate	Lyndon B. Johnson	Henry Cabot Lodge Jr.
Electoral vote	45	0
Popular vote	3,830,085	3,446,419
Percentage	52.53%	47.27%
County results
Kennedy
50–60%
60–70%
Nixon
50–60%
60–70%
70–80%
President before election
Dwight D. Eisenhower
Republican
Elected President
John F. Kennedy
Democratic

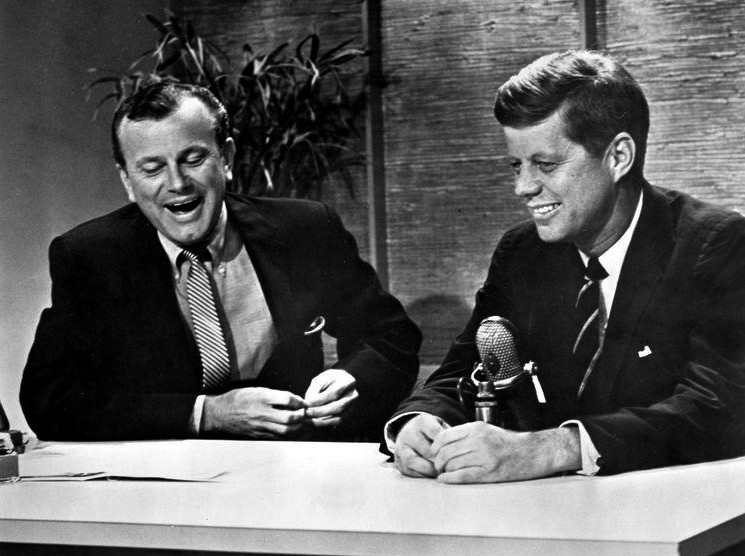
Jack Paar interviewing John F. Kennedy on New York City's The Tonight Show, 1959.

The 1960 United States presidential election in New York took place on November 8, 1960. All 50 states were part of the 1960 United States presidential election. Voters chose 45 electors to the Electoral College, which selected the president and vice president.

New York was won by Democratic Senator John F. Kennedy of Massachusetts, who was running against incumbent Republican Vice President Richard Nixon. Kennedy was running with Texas Senator, and his strongest opponent in the 1960 Democratic Party presidential primaries, Lyndon B. Johnson for vice president, and Nixon ran with internationally popular former United States Ambassador to the United Nations Henry Cabot Lodge Jr.

Kennedy won New York with 52.53% of the vote to Nixon's 47.27%, a victory margin of 5.26%. New York weighed in for this election as 5% more Democratic than the national average. The presidential election of 1960 was a very partisan election for New York, with 99.8% of the electorate voting for either the Democratic or the Republican Parties. In typical form for the time, the highly populated centers of New York City, Buffalo, and Albany, voted primarily Democratic, while the suburban areas such as Nassau and Westchester and the rural counties in New York turned out for Nixon as the Republican candidate.

Kennedy won the election in New York by a solid 5-point margin, representing a dramatic shift toward the Democratic Party in the state: just four years earlier, Dwight Eisenhower had carried New York State for the Republicans with over 60% of the vote. The results of this election in New York are typical of the nationwide trend of the urbanization of the Democratic Party, and Kennedy's dominance in heavily populated New York City was a vital component to his victory in the state. Kennedy took 62.62% of the overall vote in New York City, to Nixon's 37.04%, and carried four out of five boroughs. Kennedy's victory in Queens, in the midst of a virtual tie nationwide, marked a dramatic turning point for the heavily populated borough's political leanings.

Nixon for his part ran on a platform of continuing the "peace and prosperity" felt throughout the United States under President Eisenhower, which gained him popularity in the developing regions of the West and Pacific States, while Kennedy attained his popularity in urban regions, in part, due to his progressive stand on international politics. This included taking a stronger stance with the Soviet Union, which was a very important issue to many city-dwellers, fearing annihilation during the height of the post-nuclear age.

The electors of New York were vital to Kennedy's overall victory, as he defeated Nixon 303–219 in the United States Electoral College. Had Nixon carried New York, then all other things being equal he would have won pluralities in both the popular and electoral vote. However, the Republican nominee would have still finished two votes short of an overall majority in the Electoral College, as he would have had a total of 265 of the 267 pledged electors needed to win compared to 258 for Kennedy. The 14 unpledged electors of Mississippi and Alabama would have held the balance of power in the Electoral College (unable to influence the overall result, these electors opted to cast their votes in favor of Virginia Senator Harry F. Byrd).

1960 was the last US presidential election in which New York State had the highest population of any state in the United States. In November 1962, the state of California would overtake New York as the most populous state in the nation, thus ending New York's tenure of being the most populous state after approximately 150 years. However, New York State still had more people who would cast votes in the 1964 presidential election compared to the number of people who would do so in California.

Kennedy won the city of Syracuse, which had not supported a Democratic presidential nominee since 1944, while Kennedy cut deeply into the Republican majority in Onondaga County, where a 46.84% Republican majority in the county in 1956 was reduced to an 8.24% Republican majority in 1960.

== Results ==
1960 United States presidential election in New York
Party	Candidate	Votes	Percentage	Electoral votes
Democratic	John F. Kennedy	3,423,909	46.96%	
Liberal	John F. Kennedy	406,176	5.57%	
Total	John F. Kennedy	3,830,085	52.53%	45
Republican	Richard Nixon	3,446,419	47.27%	0
Socialist Workers	Farrell Dobbs	14,319	0.20%	0
Write-ins		256	<0.01%	0
Totals		7,291,079	100.0%	45

=== New York City results ===
1960 Presidential Election in New York City		Manhattan	The Bronx	Brooklyn	Queens	Staten Island	Total	
Democratic- Liberal	John F. Kennedy	414,902	389,818	646,582	446,348	38,673	1,936,323	62.62%
Democratic- Liberal	John F. Kennedy	65.28%	67.88%	66.16%	54.71%	43.39%	1,936,323	62.62%
Republican	Richard Nixon	217,271	182,393	327,497	367,688	50,356	1,145,205	37.04%
Republican	Richard Nixon	34.19%	31.76%	33.51%	45.07%	56.50%	1,145,205	37.04%
Socialist Workers	Farrell Dobbs	3,363	2,057	3,166	1,850	93	10,529	0.34%
Socialist Workers	Farrell Dobbs	0.53%	0.36%	0.32%	0.23%	0.10%	10,529	0.34%
TOTAL		635,567	574,282	977,306	815,899	89,123	3,092,177	100.00%

=== Results by county ===
County	John F. Kennedy Democratic/Liberal		Richard Nixon Republican		Various candidates Other parties		Margin		Total votes cast
County	#	%	#	%	#	%	#	%	Total votes cast
Albany	91,973	59.84%	61,600	40.08%	119	0.08%	30,373	19.76%	153,692
Allegany	5,280	26.81%	14,408	73.16%	7	0.04%	-9,128	-46.35%	19,695
Bronx	389,818	67.88%	182,393	31.76%	2,071	0.36%	207,425	36.12%	574,282
Broome	38,462	40.49%	56,467	59.44%	62	0.07%	-18,005	-18.95%	94,991
Cattaraugus	14,797	40.46%	21,749	59.47%	27	0.07%	-6,952	-19.01%	36,573
Cayuga	17,257	45.75%	20,437	54.18%	28	0.07%	-3,180	-8.43%	37,722
Chautauqua	28,143	42.62%	37,836	57.30%	52	0.08%	-9,693	-14.68%	66,031
Chemung	17,899	40.32%	26,469	59.62%	28	0.06%	-8,570	-19.30%	44,396
Chenango	5,659	28.01%	14,533	71.93%	12	0.06%	-8,874	-43.92%	20,204
Clinton	13,782	55.24%	11,154	44.70%	15	0.06%	2,628	10.54%	24,951
Columbia	8,747	35.46%	15,893	64.44%	24	0.10%	-7,146	-28.98%	24,664
Cortland	5,921	32.47%	12,305	67.48%	9	0.05%	-6,384	-35.01%	18,235
Delaware	5,662	25.72%	16,336	74.21%	15	0.07%	-10,674	-48.49%	22,013
Dutchess	29,842	39.26%	46,109	60.67%	53	0.07%	-16,267	-21.41%	76,004
Erie	277,203	56.62%	211,957	43.30%	404	0.08%	65,246	13.32%	489,564
Essex	6,334	35.38%	11,557	64.56%	10	0.06%	-5,223	-29.18%	17,901
Franklin	9,946	51.38%	9,385	48.48%	27	0.14%	561	2.90%	19,358
Fulton	10,409	41.83%	14,455	58.09%	19	0.08%	-4,046	-16.26%	24,883
Genesee	10,343	41.23%	14,724	58.70%	18	0.07%	-4,381	-17.47%	25,085
Greene	6,441	35.16%	11,878	64.84%	1	0.01%	-5,437	-29.68%	18,320
Hamilton	795	26.82%	2,168	73.14%	1	0.03%	-1,373	-46.32%	2,964
Herkimer	14,977	45.71%	17,758	54.19%	33	0.10%	-2,781	-8.48%	32,768
Jefferson	15,800	39.39%	24,290	60.55%	25	0.06%	-8,490	-21.16%	40,115
Kings	646,582	66.16%	327,497	33.51%	3,227	0.33%	319,085	32.65%	977,306
Lewis	4,056	37.92%	6,632	62.00%	9	0.08%	-2,576	-24.08%	10,697
Livingston	7,765	36.19%	13,681	63.77%	8	0.04%	-5,916	-27.58%	21,454
Madison	8,433	34.15%	16,245	65.78%	19	0.08%	-7,812	-31.63%	24,697
Monroe	141,378	48.76%	148,423	51.19%	147	0.05%	-7,045	-2.43%	289,948
Montgomery	15,976	51.82%	14,837	48.13%	14	0.05%	1,139	3.69%	30,827
Nassau	263,303	44.76%	324,255	55.12%	761	0.13%	-60,952	-10.36%	588,319
New York	414,902	65.28%	217,271	34.19%	3,394	0.53%	197,631	31.09%	635,567
Niagara	51,680	50.78%	50,001	49.13%	84	0.08%	1,679	1.65%	101,765
Oneida	63,368	51.53%	59,513	48.39%	100	0.08%	3,855	3.14%	122,981
Onondaga	90,836	45.84%	107,170	54.08%	150	0.08%	-16,334	-8.24%	198,156
Ontario	12,251	38.37%	19,654	61.55%	26	0.08%	-7,403	-23.18%	31,931
Orange	31,471	39.25%	48,646	60.67%	65	0.08%	-17,175	-21.42%	80,182
Orleans	5,515	34.76%	10,344	65.20%	5	0.03%	-4,829	-30.44%	15,864
Oswego	15,544	39.28%	24,013	60.69%	11	0.03%	-8,469	-21.41%	39,568
Otsego	7,899	31.16%	17,422	68.73%	26	0.10%	-9,523	-37.57%	25,347
Putnam	8,013	40.09%	11,946	59.77%	28	0.14%	-3,933	-19.68%	19,987
Queens	446,348	54.71%	367,688	45.07%	1,863	0.23%	78,660	9.64%	815,899
Rensselaer	36,109	47.33%	40,124	52.59%	61	0.08%	-4,015	-5.26%	76,294
Richmond	38,673	43.39%	50,356	56.50%	94	0.11%	-11,683	-13.11%	89,123
Rockland	27,178	45.00%	33,107	54.81%	113	0.19%	-5,929	-9.81%	60,398
St. Lawrence	19,430	42.89%	25,848	57.06%	24	0.05%	-6,418	-14.17%	45,302
Saratoga	18,179	42.03%	25,035	57.88%	36	0.08%	-6,856	-15.85%	43,250
Schenectady	37,003	47.90%	40,180	52.01%	70	0.09%	-3,177	-4.11%	77,253
Schoharie	4,342	36.18%	7,644	63.69%	16	0.13%	-3,302	-27.51%	12,002
Schuyler	2,315	30.76%	5,201	69.10%	11	0.15%	-2,886	-38.34%	7,527
Seneca	5,693	39.44%	8,741	60.55%	1	0.01%	-3,048	-21.11%	14,435
Steuben	13,898	31.91%	29,638	68.06%	13	0.03%	-15,740	-36.15%	43,549
Suffolk	114,033	40.59%	166,644	59.32%	268	0.10%	-52,611	-18.73%	280,945
Sullivan	11,486	45.44%	13,744	54.37%	49	0.19%	-2,258	-8.93%	25,279
Tioga	4,855	27.85%	12,572	72.12%	4	0.02%	-7,717	-44.27%	17,431
Tompkins	8,659	33.65%	17,061	66.30%	13	0.05%	-8,402	-32.65%	25,733
Ulster	23,017	38.68%	36,418	61.20%	67	0.11%	-13,401	-22.52%	59,502
Warren	7,328	33.65%	14,433	66.27%	17	0.08%	-7,105	-32.62%	21,778
Washington	8,274	35.48%	15,037	64.49%	6	0.03%	-6,763	-29.01%	23,317
Wayne	9,476	30.79%	21,290	69.18%	11	0.04%	-11,814	-38.39%	30,777
Westchester	171,410	43.21%	224,562	56.61%	691	0.17%	-53,152	-13.40%	396,663
Wyoming	5,508	33.78%	10,793	66.19%	6	0.04%	-5,285	-32.41%	16,307
Yates	2,409	25.88%	6,892	74.04%	7	0.08%	-4,483	-48.16%	9,308
Totals	3,830,085	52.53%	3,446,419	47.27%	14,575	0.20%	383,666	5.26%	7,291,079

==== Counties that flipped from Republican to Democratic ====
- Albany
- Clinton
- Erie
- Franklin
- Niagara
- Oneida
- Montgomery
- Queens

== See also ==
- United States presidential elections in New York
- Civil Rights Movement
- Conservative Coalition
- Cuban Missile Crisis
- Presidency of John F. Kennedy
- Presidency of Lyndon B. Johnson
- The Cold War

== Works cited ==
- Williams, John (1961). "Aspects of the American Presidential Election of 1960". Australian Quarterly. 33 (1). Australian Institute of Policy and Science: 25–36. doi:10.2307/20633678. JSTOR 20633678.
