= United States presidential elections in New York =

Presidential elections in New York
- Number of elections: 59
- Voted Democratic: 26
- Voted Republican: 21
- Voted Whig: 2
- Voted Democratic-Republican: 7
- Voted Federalist: 1
- Voted other: 1 (Note: George Washington, 1792.)
- Voted for winning candidate: 47
- Voted for losing candidate: 12

New York state is one of the initial 13 states of America, but due to a deadlock in the state legislature, it did not join the first presidential election in 1788–89. However, apart from this election, New York State has participated in all 58 other elections in U.S. history.

The political landscape of New York has undergone significant changes over the years. The Democratic Party has emerged as the dominant force in the state's politics, with a substantial majority of registered voters affiliating with the party. New York is recognized as one of the key Democratic strongholds, alongside California and Illinois. In the past, New York was considered a swing state, consistently backing the winning candidate in elections from 1792 to 1984, with only a few exceptions. However, since 1988, the state has consistently leaned towards the Democratic Party, often delivering them a significant majority of votes exceeding 60%.

New York is a signatory of the National Popular Vote Interstate Compact, an interstate compact in which signatories award all of their electoral votes to the winner of the national-level popular vote in a presidential election, even if another candidate won an individual signatory's popular vote. As of 2023, it has not yet gone into force.

== Presidential elections ==
View source data.

Key for parties
American Independent Party – (AI)
American Labor Party – (ALP)
Anti-Masonic Party – (Anti-M)
Constitutional Union Party – (CU)
Democratic Party – (D)
Democratic-Republican Party – (DR)
Free Soil Party – (FS)
Electoral fusion
Federalist Party – (F)
Green Party – (G)
Greenback Party – (GB)
Independent candidate – (I)
Know Nothing Party – (KN)
Liberal Republican Party – (LR)
Libertarian Party – (LI)
Liberty Party – (LI-1840)
National Democratic Party – (ND)
National Union Party – (NU)
Progressive Party (1912) – (PR-1912)
Progressive Party (1924) – (PR-1924)
Progressive Party (1948) – (PR-1948)
Prohibition Party – (PRO)
Reform Party – (RE)
Republican Party – (R)
Socialist Party of America – (S)
Southern Democratic Party – (SD)
Socialist Labor Party of America – (SLP)
Socialist Workers Party – (SWP)
Whig Party – (W)
Note – A double dagger (‡) indicates the national winner.

=== 1788–89 to 1820 ===
In elections before 1828, New York did not conduct a popular vote. The state legislature appointed each Elector. In the 1788-89 election, New York's state legislature failed to appoint presidential electors on time.

Presidential elections in New York from 1788–89 to 1820
Year	Winner			Runner-up			EV	Ref.
Year	Candidate	Votes	%	Candidate	Votes	%	EV	Ref.
1788–89	George Washington (I)‡	–	–	–	–	–	N/A	(Note: Washington effectively ran unopposed nationally, but New York did not participate due to a deadlock in the state legislature.)
1792	George Washington (I)‡	–	–	–	–	–	12	(Note: Electors were appointed by state legislature.) (Note: Ran unopposed)
1796	John Adams (F)‡	–	–	Thomas Jefferson (DR)	–	–	12	
1800	Thomas Jefferson (DR)‡	–	–	John Adams (F)	–	–	12	
1804	Thomas Jefferson (DR)‡	–	–	Charles C. Pinckney (F)	–	–	19	
1808	James Madison (DR)‡	–	–	Charles C. Pinckney (F)	–	–	19	
1812	DeWitt Clinton (F)	–	–	James Madison (DR)‡	–	–	29	
1816	James Monroe (DR)‡	–	–	Rufus King (F)	–	–	29	
1820	James Monroe (DR)‡	–	–	–	–	–	29	

=== 1824 ===
The election of 1824 was a complex realigning election following the collapse of the prevailing Democratic-Republican Party, resulting in four different candidates each claiming to carry the banner of the party, and competing for influence in different parts of the country. The election was the only one in history to be decided by the House of Representatives under the provisions of the Twelfth Amendment to the United States Constitution after no candidate secured a majority of the electoral vote. It was also the only presidential election in which the candidate who received a plurality of electoral votes (Andrew Jackson) did not become president, a source of great bitterness for Jackson and his supporters, who proclaimed the election of Adams a corrupt bargain. This election marks the last time the New York State Legislature chose the state's electors as opposed to using some form of popular vote method.

1860 Presidential election in New York
Year	Winner		Runner-up		Runner-up		Runner-up		Total EV	Ref.
Year	Candidate	EV	Candidate	EV	Candidate	EV	Candidate	EV	Total EV	Ref.
1824	John Quincy Adams (DR)‡	26	William H. Crawford (DR)	5	Andrew Jackson (DR)	1	Henry Clay (DR)	4	36	

=== 1828 ===
In this election, each district's election result decided the electoral college.

1828 Presidential election in New York
Year	Winner				Runner-up				Total EV	Ref.
Year	Candidate	Votes	%	EV	Candidate	Votes	%	EV	Total EV	Ref.
1828	Andrew Jackson (D)‡	139,412	51.45%	20	John Quincy Adams (NR)	131,563	48.55%	16	36	

=== 1832 to 1856 ===
Presidential elections in New York from 1828 to 1856
Year	Winner			Runner-up			Other candidate (Note: For purposes of these lists, other national candidates are defined as those who won at least one electoral vote, or won at least ten percent of the vote in multiple states.)			EV	Ref.
Year	Candidate	Votes	%	Candidate	Votes	%	Candidate	Votes	%	EV	Ref.
1832	Andrew Jackson (D)‡	168,497	52.1%	Henry Clay (NR)	154,896	47.9%	–	–	–	42	
1836	Martin Van Buren (D)‡	166,795	54.63%	William Henry Harrison (W)	138,548	45.37%	–	–	–	42	
1840	William Henry Harrison (W)‡	226,001	51.18%	Martin Van Buren (D)	212,733	48.18%	James G. Birney (LI-1840)	2,809	0.64%	42	
1844	James K. Polk (D)‡	237,588	48.9%	Henry Clay (W)	232,482	47.85%	James G. Birney (LI-1840)	15,812	3.25%	36	
1848	Zachary Taylor (W)‡	218,583	47.94%	Martin Van Buren (FS)	120,497	26.43%	Lewis Cass (D)	114,319	25.07%	36	
1852	Franklin Pierce (D)‡	262,083	50.18%	Winfield Scott (W)	234,882	44.97%	John P. Hale (FS)	25,329	4.85%	35	
1856	John C. Frémont (R)	276,004	46.27%	James Buchanan (D)‡	195,878	32.84%	Millard Fillmore (KN)	124,604	20.89%	35	

=== 1860 ===
The election of 1860 was a complex realigning election in which the breakdown of the previous two-party alignment culminated in four parties each competing for influence in different parts of the country. The result of the election, with the victory of an ardent opponent of slavery, spurred the secession of eleven states and brought about the American Civil War.

1860 Presidential election in New York
Year	Winner		Runner-up		EV	Ref.
Year	Candidate	Votes (%)	Candidate	Votes (%)	EV	Ref.
1860	Abraham Lincoln (R)‡	362,646 (53.71%)	Stephen A. Douglas (D), John C. Breckinridge (SD) and John Bell (CU)	312,510 (46.29%)	35	

=== 1864 to present ===
Presidential elections in New York from 1864 to present
Year	Winner			Runner-up			Other candidate (Note: For purposes of these lists, other candidates are defined as those who were in third place in New York.)			EV	Ref.
Year	Candidate	Votes	%	Candidate	Votes	%	Candidate	Votes	%	EV	Ref.
1864	Abraham Lincoln (NU)‡	368,735	50.46%	George B. McClellan (D)	361,986	49.54%	–	–	–	33	
1868	Horatio Seymour (D)	429,883	50.59%	Ulysses S. Grant (R)‡	419,888	49.41%	–	–	–	33	
1872	Ulysses S. Grant (R)‡	440,738	53.23%	Horace Greeley (LR)	387,282	46.77%	–	–	–	35	
1876	Samuel J. Tilden (D)	521,949	51.4%	Rutherford B. Hayes (R)‡	489,207	48.17%	Green Smith (PRO)	2,369	0.23%	35	
1880	James A. Garfield (R)‡	555,544	50.32%	Winfield S. Hancock (D)	534,511	48.42%	James B. Weaver (GB)	12,373	1.12%	35	
1884	Grover Cleveland (D)‡	563,154	48.25%	James G. Blaine (R)	562,005	48.15%	John St. John (PRO)	25,006	2.14%	36	
1888	Benjamin Harrison (R)‡	650,338	49.28%	Grover Cleveland (D)	635,965	48.19%	Clinton Fisk (PRO)	30,231	2.29%	36	
1892	Grover Cleveland (D)‡	654,868	48.99%	Benjamin Harrison (R)	609,350	45.58%	John Bidwell (PRO)	38,190	2.86%	36	
1896	William McKinley (R)‡	819,838	57.58%	William Jennings Bryan (D)	551,369	38.72%	John McAuley Palmer (ND)	18,950	1.33%	36	
1900	William McKinley (R)‡	822,013	53.1%	William Jennings Bryan (D)	678,462	43.83%	John G. Woolley (PRO)	22,077	1.43%	36	
1904	Theodore Roosevelt (R)‡	859,533	53.13%	Alton B. Parker (D)	683,981	42.28%	Eugene V. Debs (S)	36,883	2.28%	39	
1908	William Howard Taft (R)‡	870,070	53.11%	William Jennings Bryan (D)	667,468	40.74%	Eugene V. Debs (S)	38,451	2.35%	39	
1912	Woodrow Wilson (D)‡	655,573	41.27%	William Howard Taft (R)	455,487	28.68%	Theodore Roosevelt (PR-1912)	390,093	24.56%	45	
1916	Charles Evans Hughes (R)	879,238	51.53%	Woodrow Wilson (D)‡	759,426	44.51%	Allan L. Benson (S)	45,944	2.69%	45	
1920	Warren G. Harding (R)‡	1,871,167	64.56%	James M. Cox (D)	781,238	26.95%	Eugene V. Debs (S)	203,201	7.01%	45	
1924	Calvin Coolidge (R)‡	1,820,058	55.76%	John W. Davis (D)	950,796	29.13%	Robert M. La Follette (PR-1924)	474,913	14.55%	45	
1928	Herbert Hoover (R)‡	2,193,344	49.79%	Al Smith (D)	2,089,863	47.44%	Norman Thomas (S)	107,332	2.44%	45	
1932	Franklin D. Roosevelt (D)‡	2,534,959	54.07%	Herbert Hoover (R)	1,937,963	41.33%	Norman Thomas (S)	177,397	3.78%	47	
1936	Franklin D. Roosevelt (D)‡	3,293,222	58.85%	Alf Landon (R)	2,180,670	38.97%	Norman Thomas (S)	86,897	1.55%	47	
1940	Franklin D. Roosevelt (D)‡	3,251,918	51.5%	Wendell Willkie (R)	3,027,478	47.95%	Norman Thomas (S)	18,950	0.3%	47	
1944	Franklin D. Roosevelt (D)‡	3,304,238	52.31%	Thomas E. Dewey (R)	2,987,647	47.3%	Edward A. Teichert (SLP)	14,352	0.23%	47	
1948	Thomas E. Dewey (R)	2,841,163	45.99%	Harry S. Truman (D)‡	2,780,204	45.01%	Henry A. Wallace (PR-1948)	509,559	8.25%	47	
1952	Dwight D. Eisenhower (R)‡	3,952,815	55.45%	Adlai Stevenson II (D)	3,104,601	43.55%	Vincent Hallinan (ALP)	64,211	0.9%	45	
1956	Dwight D. Eisenhower (R)‡	4,345,506	61.24%	Adlai Stevenson II (D)	2,458,282	34.64%	Write-ins	2,521	0.04%	45	
1960	John F. Kennedy (D)‡	3,830,085	52.53%	Richard Nixon (R)	3,446,419	47.27%	Farrell Dobbs (SWP)	14,319	0.2%	45	
1964	Lyndon B. Johnson (D)‡	4,913,156	68.56%	Barry Goldwater (R)	2,243,559	31.31%	Eric Hass (SLP)	6,085	0.5%	43	
1968	Hubert Humphrey (D)	3,378,470	49.76%	Richard Nixon (R)‡	3,007,932	44.3%	George Wallace (AI)	358,864	5.29%	43	
1972	Richard Nixon (R)‡	4,192,778	58.54%	George McGovern (D)	2,951,084	41.21%	Evelyn Reed (SWP)	7,797	0.11%	41	
1976	Jimmy Carter (D)‡	3,389,558	51.87%	Gerald Ford (R)	3,100,791	47.46%	Roger MacBride (LI)	12,197	0.19%	41	
1980	Ronald Reagan (R)‡	2,893,831	46.66%	Jimmy Carter (D)	2,728,372	43.99%	John B. Anderson (I)	467,801	7.54%	41	
1984	Ronald Reagan (R)‡	3,664,763	53.84%	Walter Mondale (D)	3,119,609	45.83%	David Bergland (LI)	11,949	0.18%	36	
1988	Michael Dukakis (D)	3,347,882	51.62%	George H. W. Bush (R)‡	3,081,871	47.52%	Ron Paul (LI)	20,497	0.32%	36	
1992	Bill Clinton (D)‡	3,444,450	49.73%	George H. W. Bush (R)	2,346,649	33.88%	Ross Perot (I)	1,090,721	15.75%	33	
1996	Bill Clinton (D)‡	3,756,177	59.47%	Bob Dole (R)	1,933,492	30.61%	Ross Perot (RE)	503,458	7.97%	33	
2000	Al Gore (D)	4,113,791	60.22%	George W. Bush (R)‡	2,405,676	35.22%	Ralph Nader (G)	244,398	3.58%	33	
2004	John Kerry (D)	4,314,280	58.37%	George W. Bush (R)‡	2,962,567	40.08%	Ralph Nader (I)	99,873	1.35%	31	
2008	Barack Obama (D)‡	4,804,945	62.88%	John McCain (R)	2,752,771	36.03%	Ralph Nader (I)	41,249	0.54%	31	
2012	Barack Obama (D)‡	4,485,741	63.35%	Mitt Romney (R)	2,490,431	35.17%	Gary Johnson (LI)	47,256	0.07%	29	
2016	Hillary Clinton (D)	4,556,124	59.38%	Donald Trump (R)‡	2,819,534	36.75%	Gary Johnson (LI)	176,598	2.3%	29	
2020	Joe Biden (D)‡	5,244,886	60.87%	Donald Trump (R)	3,251,997	37.74%	Jo Jorgensen (LI)	60,383	0.7%	29	
2024	Kamala Harris (D)	4,619,195	55.12%	Donald Trump (R)‡	3,578,899	42.71%	Write-ins	182,364	2.18%	28	

== See also ==
- Elections in New York

== Works cited ==
- Guide to U.S. Elections. SAGE Publications. 2010. ISBN 978-1-60426-536-1. LCCN 2009033938. OL 24461757M.
- Burnham, Walter Dean (1955). Presidential Ballots, 1836–1892. Johns Hopkins University Press. LCCN 55008428. OL 6176796M.
- Presidential Elections, 1789–1996. Congressional Quarterly. 1997. ISBN 978-1-56802-065-5. LCCN 97019084. OL 673017M.
