= 1952 United States presidential election in New York =

- November 4, 1952
- Turnout: 71.2% ▲6.2 pp

Nominee	Dwight D. Eisenhower	Adlai Stevenson
Party	Republican	Democratic
Alliance		Liberal
Home state	New York	Illinois
Running mate	Richard Nixon	John Sparkman
Electoral vote	45	0
Popular vote	3,952,815	3,104,601
Percentage	55.45%	43.55%
County results
Eisenhower
50–60%
60–70%
70–80%
80–90%
Stevenson
50–60%
60–70%
President before election
Harry S. Truman
Democratic
Elected President
Dwight D. Eisenhower
Republican

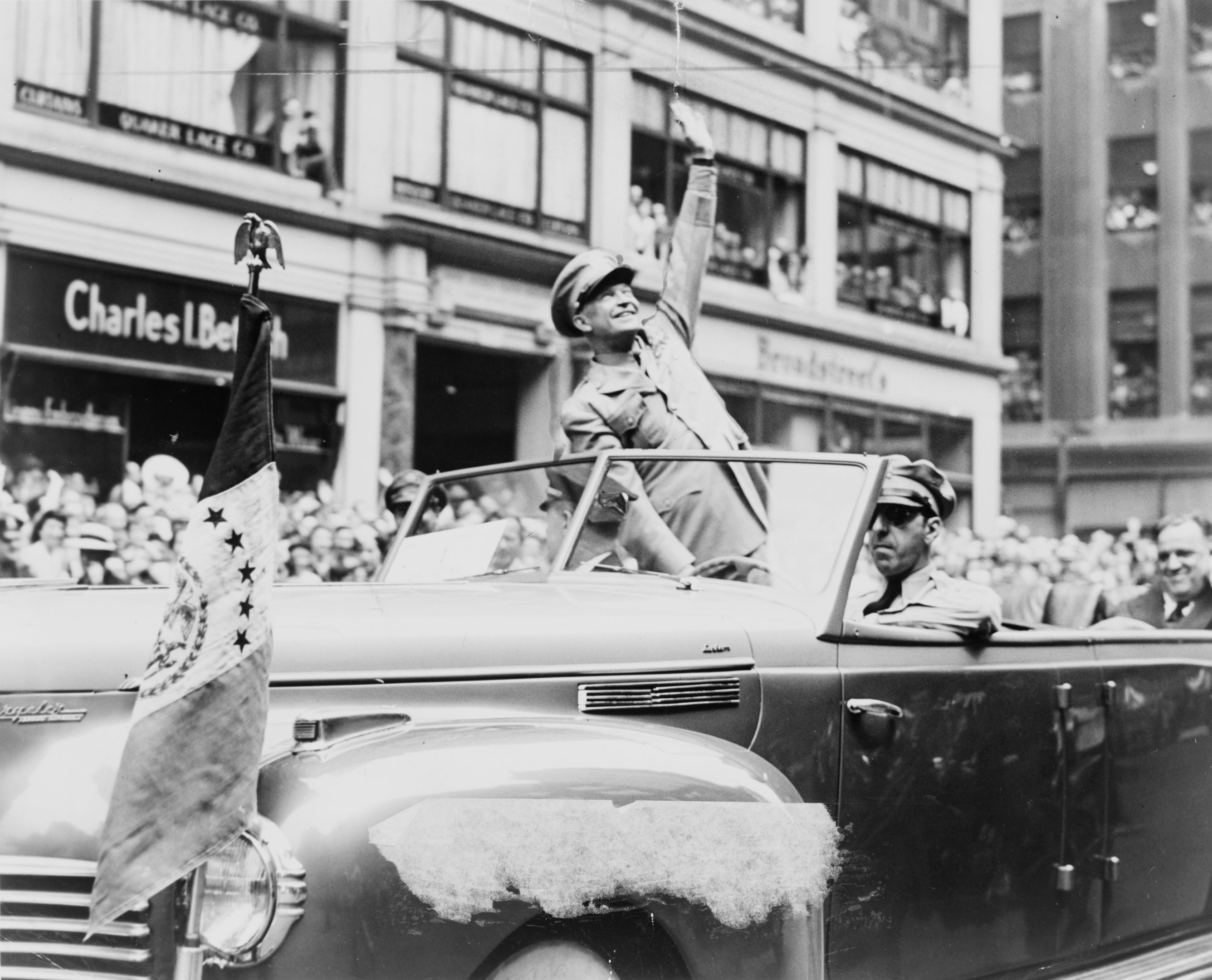
Much of Eisenhower's popularity as a politician was based on his role as Supreme Allied Commander during the end of World War II - shown here at the WWII victory parade in New York City.

The 1952 United States presidential election in New York took place on November 4, 1952. All contemporary 48 states were part of the 1952 United States presidential election. Voters chose 45 electors to the Electoral College, which selected the president and vice president.

New York was won by former Supreme Allied Commander and World War II hero, Republican Dwight D. Eisenhower, who was running against Democratic Governor of Illinois Adlai Stevenson. Eisenhower ran with California Senator Richard Nixon as vice president, and Stevenson ran with Alabama Senator John Sparkman.

Eisenhower carried New York with 55.45% of the vote to Stevenson's 43.55%, a victory margin of 11.90%. New York weighed in for this election as 1% more Republican than the national average. Eisenhower proved to be very popular in many of the Northern and Mid-West States, and took nearly every county in the State of New York, with the exception of a handful of counties conglomerate with New York City. The only counties in the state to vote for Stevenson were the New York City boroughs of Manhattan, Brooklyn, and the Bronx, allowing Stevenson to win New York City overall. Eisenhower ultimately won the election to the White House in 1952 as a war hero, a political outsider, and a moderate Republican who pledged to protect and support popular New Deal Democratic policies, ending twenty years of Democratic control of the White House.

Eisenhower won the election in New York (his home state in the election) by a decisive 12-point margin. National turnout for the presidential election of 1952 is evident of the contemporary, lingering Democratic stronghold in the Deep South, which was the only region to vote primarily for Stevenson. Eisenhower was the first presidential candidate in United States history (and largely, globally as well) who targeted a large portion of his campaign to women voters. Dwindling popularity for the administration of Truman during the months following the conflict in Korea, and coupled with the relatively progressive agenda and campaign strategy laid down by the Republican Party, contributed to Eisenhower's powerful rise across the country.

== Results ==
1952 United States presidential election in New York
Party	Candidate	Votes	Percentage	Electoral votes
Republican	Dwight D. Eisenhower	3,952,815	55.45%	45
Democratic	Adlai Stevenson	2,687,890	37.71%	
Liberal	Adlai Stevenson	416,711	5.85%	
Total	Adlai Stevenson	3,104,601	43.55%	0
American Labor (Note: Although he ran under the “Progressive” label in other states, in New York Hallinan was endorsed by the American Labor Party and ran under that party’s banner.)	Vincent Hallinan	64,211	0.90%	0
Socialist	Darlington Hoopes	2,664	0.04%	0
Socialist Workers	Farrell Dobbs	2,212	0.03%	0
Socialist Labor	Eric Hass	1,560	0.02%	0
Write-ins		178	<0.01%	0
Totals		7,128,241	100.0%	45

=== New York City results ===
1952 Presidential Election in New York City		Manhattan	The Bronx	Brooklyn	Queens	Staten Island	Total	
Democratic- Liberal	Adlai Stevenson	446,727	392,477	656,229	331,217	28,280	1,854,930	54.37%
Democratic- Liberal	Adlai Stevenson	58.38%	60.50%	58.42%	41.94%	33.42%	1,854,930	54.37%
Republican	Dwight D. Eisenhower	300,284	241,898	446,708	450,610	55,993	1,495,493	43.84%
Republican	Dwight D. Eisenhower	39.24%	37.29%	39.77%	57.06%	66.18%	1,495,493	43.84%
American Labor	Vincent Hallinan	16,974	13,420	18,765	7,194	294	56,647	1.66%
American Labor	Vincent Hallinan	2.22%	2.07%	1.67%	0.91%	0.35%	56,647	1.66%
Socialist Workers	Farrell Dobbs	531	348	572	288	6	1,745	0.05%
Socialist Workers	Farrell Dobbs	0.07%	0.05%	0.05%	0.04%	0.01%	1,745	0.05%
Socialist	Darlington Hoopes	441	366	662	175	16	1,660	0.05%
Socialist	Darlington Hoopes	0.06%	0.06%	0.06%	0.02%	0.02%	1,660	0.05%
Socialist Labor	Eric Hass	200	225	307	133	16	881	0.02%
Socialist Labor	Eric Hass	0.03%	0.03%	0.03%	0.02%	0.02%	881	0.02%
TOTAL		765,155	648,753	1,123,249	789,682	84,606	3,411,445	100.00%

=== Results by county ===
County	Dwight D. Eisenhower Republican		Adlai Stevenson Democratic/Liberal		Vincent Hallinan American Labor		Various candidates Other parties		Margin		Total votes cast
County	#	%	#	%	#	%	#	%	#	%	Total votes cast
Albany	79,871	52.28%	72,633	47.54%	266	0.18%			7,238	4.74%	152,770
Allegany	16,365	80.54%	3,943	19.41%	10	0.05%			12,422	61.13%	20,318
Bronx	241,898	37.34%	392,477	60.59%	13,420	2.07%			-150,579	-23.25%	647,795
Broome	64,738	71.38%	25,833	28.48%	119	0.13%			38,905	42.90%	90,690
Cattaraugus	24,808	68.58%	11,333	31.33%	34	0.09%			13,509	37.25%	36,175
Cayuga	25,037	68.08%	11,695	31.80%	46	0.12%			13,342	36.28%	36,778
Chautauqua	42,043	64.14%	23,427	35.74%	79	0.12%			18,616	28.40%	65,549
Chemung	30,188	68.57%	13,729	31.19%	79	0.18%			16,459	37.41%	43,996
Chenango	16,062	79.66%	4,089	20.28%	13	0.06%			11,973	59.38%	20,164
Clinton	14,535	64.50%	7,963	35.34%	37	0.16%			6,572	29.16%	22,535
Columbia	17,539	74.16%	6,075	25.69%	35	0.15%			11,464	48.47%	23,649
Cortland	13,985	77.32%	4,079	22.55%	24	0.13%			9,906	54.77%	18,088
Delaware	17,737	81.10%	4,116	18.82%	18	0.08%			13,621	62.28%	21,871
Dutchess	46,381	71.17%	18,644	28.61%	142	0.22%			27,737	42.56%	65,167
Erie	253,927	56.32%	196,378	43.56%	550	0.12%			57,549	12.76%	450,855
Essex	12,800	75.53%	4,130	24.37%	16	0.10%			8,670	51.16%	16,946
Franklin	12,212	64.89%	6,591	35.02%	17	0.09%			5,621	29.87%	18,820
Fulton	18,068	70.31%	7,570	29.46%	58	0.23%			10,498	40.85%	25,696
Genesee	16,606	70.85%	6,819	29.10%	12	0.05%			9,787	41.75%	23,437
Greene	12,907	74.07%	4,504	25.85%	15	0.08%			8,403	48.22%	17,426
Hamilton	2,615	82.65%	546	17.26%	3	0.09%			2,069	65.39%	3,164
Herkimer	20,980	64.26%	11,599	35.53%	70	0.21%			9,381	28.73%	32,649
Jefferson	27,932	69.88%	12,026	30.09%	13	0.03%			15,906	39.79%	39,971
Kings	446,708	39.82%	656,229	58.50%	18,765	1.68%			-209,521	-18.68%	1,121,702
Lewis	7,622	72.14%	2,927	27.70%	17	0.16%			4,695	44.44%	10,566
Livingston	14,760	71.37%	5,901	28.53%	19	0.09%			8,859	42.84%	20,680
Madison	17,715	76.73%	5,353	23.19%	19	0.08%			12,362	53.54%	23,087
Monroe	159,172	58.89%	110,723	40.97%	370	0.14%			48,449	17.92%	270,265
Montgomery	19,554	60.13%	12,934	39.77%	31	0.10%			6,620	20.36%	32,519
Nassau	305,900	69.87%	130,267	29.75%	1,669	0.38%			175,633	40.12%	437,836
New York	300,284	39.30%	446,727	58.47%	16,974	2.23%			-146,443	-19.17%	763,985
Niagara	54,843	59.97%	36,504	39.91%	108	0.12%			18,339	20.06%	91,455
Oneida	69,652	60.98%	44,438	38.90%	134	0.12%			25,214	22.08%	114,224
Onondaga	119,268	64.96%	64,022	34.87%	302	0.17%			55,246	30.09%	183,592
Ontario	21,659	71.15%	8,763	28.79%	18	0.06%			12,896	42.36%	30,440
Orange	51,217	71.23%	20,585	28.63%	98	0.14%			30,632	42.60%	71,900
Orleans	11,686	74.97%	3,893	24.98%	8	0.05%			7,793	49.99%	15,587
Oswego	27,609	70.66%	11,444	29.29%	19	0.05%			16,165	41.37%	39,072
Otsego	20,304	76.78%	6,115	23.12%	27	0.10%			14,189	53.66%	26,446
Putnam	11,038	68.57%	5,001	31.07%	58	0.36%			6,037	37.50%	16,097
Queens	450,610	57.11%	331,217	41.98%	7,194	0.91%			119,393	15.13%	789,021
Rensselaer	51,453	66.57%	25,734	33.29%	109	0.14%			25,719	33.28%	77,296
Richmond	55,993	66.21%	28,280	33.44%	294	0.35%			27,713	32.77%	84,567
Rockland	27,657	64.39%	15,084	35.12%	212	0.49%			12,573	29.27%	42,953
Saratoga	29,712	72.17%	11,413	27.72%	43	0.11%			18,299	44.45%	41,168
Schenectady	54,272	66.48%	27,157	33.27%	208	0.25%			27,115	33.21%	81,637
Schoharie	8,972	71.78%	3,509	28.07%	18	0.15%			5,463	43.71%	12,499
Schuyler	5,604	75.68%	1,784	24.09%	17	0.23%			3,820	51.59%	7,405
Seneca	9,669	69.01%	4,328	30.89%	15	0.10%			5,341	38.12%	14,012
St. Lawrence	28,036	68.27%	13,000	31.65%	32	0.08%			15,036	36.62%	41,068
Steuben	32,123	74.14%	11,154	25.74%	49	0.12%			20,969	48.40%	43,326
Suffolk	115,570	74.58%	39,120	25.25%	262	0.17%			76,450	49.33%	154,952
Sullivan	14,926	63.26%	8,421	35.69%	247	1.05%			6,505	27.57%	23,594
Tioga	11,799	78.19%	3,259	21.60%	32	0.21%			8,540	56.59%	15,090
Tompkins	18,673	74.66%	6,285	25.13%	54	0.21%			12,388	49.53%	25,012
Ulster	36,141	69.44%	15,733	30.23%	171	0.33%			20,408	39.21%	52,045
Warren	17,046	77.06%	5,051	22.84%	22	0.10%			11,995	54.22%	22,119
Washington	17,551	73.80%	6,210	26.11%	22	0.09%			11,341	47.69%	23,783
Wayne	21,693	76.53%	6,621	23.36%	33	0.11%			15,072	53.17%	28,347
Westchester	237,105	67.38%	113,358	32.21%	1,454	0.41%			123,747	35.17%	351,917
Wyoming	12,154	75.05%	4,038	24.94%	2	0.01%			8,116	50.11%	16,194
Yates	7,831	81.07%	1,820	18.84%	9	0.09%			6,011	62.23%	9,660
Totals	3,952,815	55.45%	3,104,601	43.55%	64,211	0.90%	6,614 (Note: Not all counties recorded votes for candidates other than Eisenhower, Stevenson and Hallinan separately, so votes for the remaining three on-ballot candidates and scattered write-in candidates have been listed only as a state-wide total.)	0.09%	848,214	11.90%	7,128,241

==== Counties that flipped from Democratic to Republican ====
- Albany
- Erie
- Monroe
- Oneida

=== Results by congressional district ===
Eisenhower won 29 out of 43 of New York's congressional districts while Stevenson won the other 14 congressional districts.

District	Eisenhower	Stevenson
1st	74.5%	25.5%
2nd	71.3%	28.7%
3rd	68.6%	31.4%
4th	63.6%	36.4%
5th	61.7%	38.3%
6th	51.6%	48.4%
7th	56.8%	43.2%
8th	38.8%	61.2%
9th	41.2%	58.8%
10th	32.2%	67.8%
11th	26.1%	73.9%
12th	55.4%	44.6%
13th	31.6%	68.4%
14th	42.2%	57.8%
15th	67.7%	32.3%
16th	17.4%	82.6%
17th	58.4%	41.6%
18th	44.5%	55.5%
19th	34.7%	65.3%
20th	41.1%	58.9%
21st	37.7%	62.3%
22nd	29.1%	70.9%
23rd	23%	77%
24th	37.5%	62.5%
25th	57.9%	42.1%
26th	67.8%	32.2%
27th	67.6%	32.4%
28th	69.8%	30.2%
29th	71.6%	28.4%
30th	54.6%	45.4%
31st	72.4%	27.6%
32nd	67.9%	32.1%
33rd	69.2%	30.8%
34th	63.8%	36.2%
35th	65.1%	34.9%
36th	73.4%	26.6%
37th	72%	28%
38th	60.9%	39.1%
39th	64.6%	35.4%
40th	59.2%	40.8%
41st	54.9%	45.1%
42nd	56.8%	43.2%
43rd	68.7%	31.3%

== See also ==
- United States presidential elections in New York
- History of nuclear weapons
- "I Like Ike"
- Presidency of Dwight D. Eisenhower
- The Korean War
- The McCarthy Era
- Women's Suffrage
