= 1808 United States presidential election in New York =

- November 7, 1808
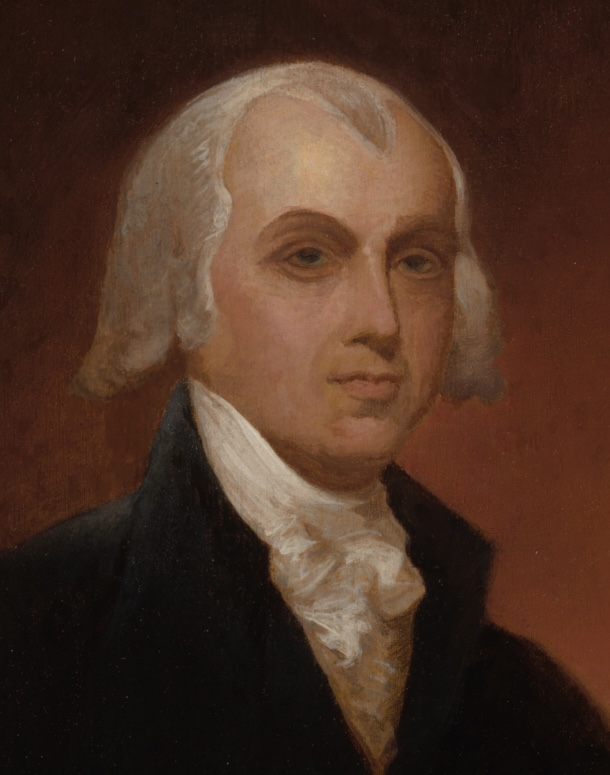

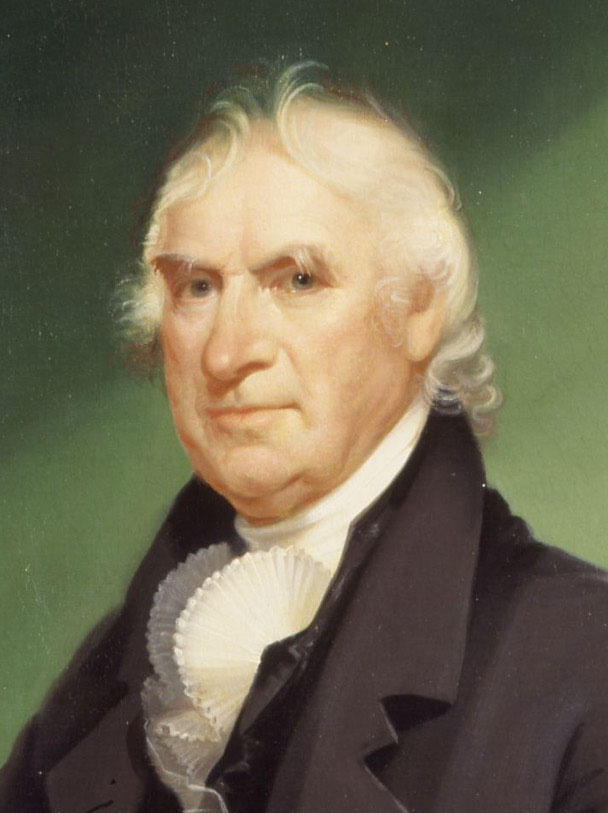
Nominee	James Madison	George Clinton
Party	Democratic-Republican	Democratic-Republican
Home state	Virginia	New York
Running mate	George Clinton	James Madison/ James Monroe
Electoral vote	13	6
Percentage	68.38%	31.62%
President before election
Thomas Jefferson
Democratic-Republican
Elected President
James Madison
Democratic-Republican

The 1808 United States presidential election in New York took place on November 7, 1808, as part of the 1808 United States presidential election. The state legislature chose 19 representatives, or electors to the Electoral College, who voted for President and Vice President.

During this election, New York split its 19 electoral votes among two Democratic-Republican candidates. 13 electoral votes went to Secretary of State James Madison while the remaining 6 went to incumbent Vice President George Clinton. Clinton was also supported by a group of New York Democratic-Republicans for president even though he had remained the party's official vice presidential candidate.

This would be the final election until 1972 in which New York did not have the largest number of electors in the Electoral College.

== See also ==
- United States presidential elections in New York
