= 1884 United States presidential election in New York =

- November 4, 1884
- Turnout: 87.5% ▼1.8 pp

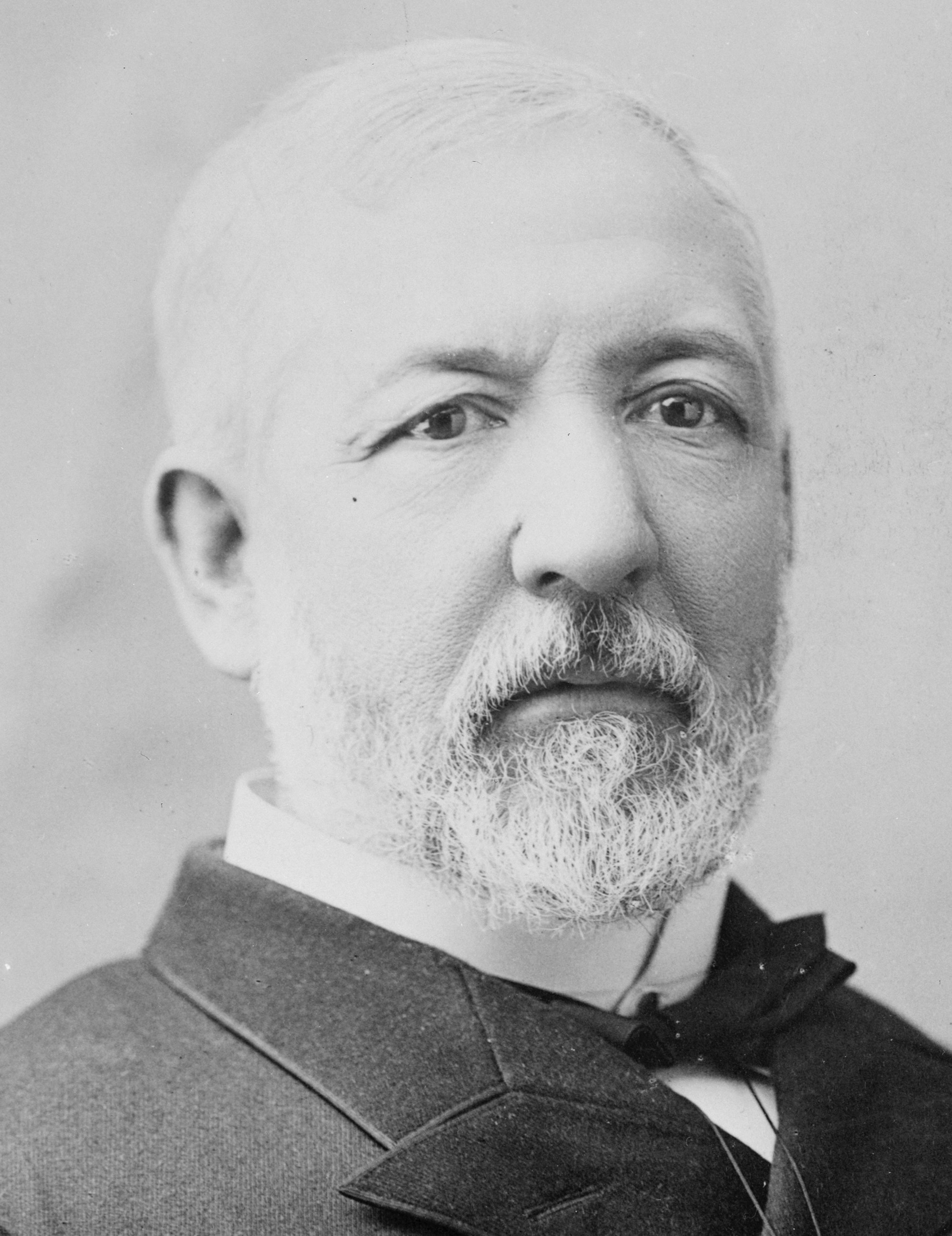
Nominee	Grover Cleveland	James G. Blaine
Party	Democratic	Republican
Home state	New York	Maine
Running mate	Thomas A. Hendricks	John A. Logan
Electoral vote	36	0
Popular vote	563,154	562,005
Percentage	48.25%	48.15%
County results
Cleveland
40–50%
50–60%
60–70%
Blaine
40–50%
50–60%
60–70%
President before election
Chester A. Arthur
Republican
Elected President
Grover Cleveland
Democratic

The 1884 United States presidential election in New York took place on November 4, 1884. All contemporary 38 states were part of the 1884 United States presidential election. Voters chose 36 electors to the Electoral College, which selected the president and vice president.

New York was won by the Democratic nominees, Governor Grover Cleveland of New York and his running mate former Senator and Governor Thomas A. Hendricks of Indiana. Cleveland and Hendricks defeated the Republican nominees, former Secretary of State and Senator James G. Blaine of Maine and his running mate Senator John A. Logan of Illinois.

== Results ==
=== Overview and analysis ===
Cleveland narrowly carried New York State with a plurality of 48.25 percent of the vote to Blaine's 48.15 percent, a victory margin of 0.10 percent and just 1,149 votes in all, making this election the closest presidential contest in the state's history to date. In a distant third came the Prohibition Party candidate John St. John with 2.14 percent, while Greenback Party candidate Benjamin Butler came in fourth, with 1.46 percent.

New York weighed in for this election as less than 1 percentage point more Republican than the national average.

Cleveland's narrow victory in his home state, with its 36 electoral votes, proved decisive in clinching him the 1884 election and allowing him to win the presidency. He won despite strong opposition to Cleveland from the corrupt Tammany Hall machine, which held significant influence over New York's politics.

Cleveland performed most strongly downstate in the New York City area, where he won New York County, Kings County, Queens County, and received over 60% of the vote in Richmond County. Cleveland also won nearby Suffolk County, Westchester County, and Rockland County. Blaine won much of upstate New York, including a victory in Erie County, home to the city of Buffalo, although Cleveland did win Albany County, home to the state capital of Albany, along with several rural upstate counties.

The state's electors were decisive to Democrats winning the Electoral College over Republicans.

The Prohibition Party tickles may have had a spoiler effect on the state's result. The Prohibition nominee for president was John P. St. John, who previously served as governor of Kansas as a Republican. A notable share of voters who usually supported the Republican Party were particularly distrusting of the Republican presidential nominee James G. Blaine, making the option to cast a third-party for a former Republican governor appealing. In New York, the votes received by St. John were much greater than Cleveland's margin-of-victory over Blaine. It is considered probable that the Prohibition ticket had attracted enough votes from disaffected Republicans in New York to swing New York's result.

=== Statewide totals ===
1884 United States presidential election in New York
Party	Candidate	Running mate	Popular vote		Electoral vote	
Party	Candidate	Running mate	Count	%	Count	%
Democratic	Grover Cleveland of New York	Thomas A. Hendricks of Indiana	563,154	48.25%	36	100.00%
Republican	James G. Blaine of Maine	John A. Logan of Illinois	562,005	48.15%	0	0.00%
Prohibition	John St. John of Kansas	William Daniel of Maryland	25,006	2.14%	0	0.00%
Greenback	Benjamin Butler of Massachusetts	Absolom M. West of Mississippi	17,004	1.46%	0	0.00%
Total			1,167,169	100.00%	36	100.00%

=== Results by county ===
County	Grover Cleveland Democratic		James G. Blaine Republican		John St. John Prohibition		Benjamin Butler Greenback		Margin		Total votes cast
County	#	%	#	%	#	%	#	%	#	%	Total votes cast
Albany	18,343	49.13%	17,698	47.40%	312	0.84%	983	2.63%	645	1.73%	37,336
Allegany	3,886	31.16%	6,668	53.47%	1,180	9.46%	736	5.90%	-2,782	-22.31%	12,470
Broome	5,780	42.61%	7,182	52.95%	458	3.38%	144	1.06%	-1,402	-10.34%	13,564
Cattaraugus	6,065	40.90%	7,463	50.32%	930	6.27%	372	2.51%	-1,398	-9.43%	14,830
Cayuga	6,041	37.16%	9,205	56.62%	591	3.64%	421	2.59%	-3,164	-19.46%	16,258
Chautauqua	5,861	33.49%	10,670	60.96%	540	3.09%	431	2.46%	-4,809	-27.48%	17,502
Chemung	4,719	44.04%	5,198	48.51%	185	1.73%	613	5.72%	-479	-4.47%	10,715
Chenango	4,410	41.17%	5,462	50.99%	506	4.72%	334	3.12%	-1,052	-9.82%	10,712
Clinton	5,151	46.08%	5,973	53.44%	35	0.31%	19	0.17%	-822	-7.35%	11,178
Columbia	5,854	46.88%	6,424	51.45%	173	1.39%	36	0.29%	-570	-4.56%	12,487
Cortland	2,774	37.98%	4,042	55.35%	375	5.13%	112	1.53%	-1,268	-17.36%	7,303
Delaware	4,956	43.33%	5,934	51.88%	437	3.82%	112	0.98%	-978	-8.55%	11,439
Dutchess	8,677	45.73%	9,701	51.13%	498	2.62%	98	0.52%	-1,024	-5.40%	18,974
Erie	24,759	47.62%	26,249	50.49%	725	1.39%	260	0.50%	-1,490	-2.87%	51,993
Essex	2,776	37.25%	4,551	61.06%	65	0.87%	61	0.82%	-1,775	-23.82%	7,453
Franklin	2,948	38.15%	4,638	60.02%	75	0.97%	67	0.87%	-1,690	-21.87%	7,728
Fulton	3,524	41.92%	4,617	54.93%	227	2.70%	38	0.45%	-1,093	-13.00%	8,406
Genesee	3,643	41.87%	4,631	53.22%	386	4.44%	41	0.47%	-988	-11.36%	8,701
Greene	4,152	47.39%	4,167	47.56%	260	2.97%	182	2.08%	-15	-0.17%	8,761
Hamilton	567	50.99%	521	46.85%	21	1.89%	3	0.27%	46	4.14%	1,112
Herkimer	5,328 (Note: The summary table in the 1885 Manual contains a typo for Cleveland in this county. The correct figure is 5,328 and is listed in the detailed chart for Herkimer County on page 574. It is also given in the summary table by the 1885 Tribune Almanac.)	44.96%	6,138	51.80%	327	2.76%	57	0.48%	-810	-6.84%	11,850
Jefferson	7,075	42.18%	9,029	53.83%	636	3.79%	33	0.20%	-1,954	-11.65%	16,773
Kings	69,264	54.83%	53,516	42.36%	1,360	1.08%	2,182 (Note: The stated figure here in all sources is 2,181 but using that figure causes Butler's county by county results to not add up correctly to the statewide total. The 1885 Tribune Almanac lists the results by towns in Kings County and Butler's numbers there add up to 2,182, thus correcting the discrepancy.)	1.73%	15,748	12.47%	126,322
Lewis	3,778	48.69%	3,854	49.66%	114	1.47%	14	0.18%	-76	-0.98%	7,760
Livingston	4,039	41.54%	5,191	53.39%	375	3.86%	118	1.21%	-1,152	-11.85%	9,723
Madison	4,870	40.27%	6,608	54.64%	529	4.37%	86	0.71%	-1,738	-14.37%	12,093
Monroe	13,249	39.68%	18,325	54.89%	1,209	3.62%	603	1.81%	-5,076	-15.20%	33,386
Montgomery	5,413	48.77%	5,505	49.59%	134	1.21%	48	0.43%	-92	-0.83%	11,100
New York	133,222	58.47%	90,095	39.54%	1,031	0.45%	3,499	1.54%	43,127	18.93%	227,847
Niagara	6,193	49.01%	5,875	46.49%	500	3.96%	69	0.55%	318	2.52%	12,637
Oneida	13,823	48.17%	13,790	48.06%	894	3.12%	189	0.66%	33	0.11%	28,696
Onondaga	13,166	42.81%	16,892	54.92%	601	1.95%	99	0.32%	-3,726	-12.11%	30,758
Ontario	5,643	45.56%	6,382	51.53%	234	1.89%	127	1.03%	-739	-5.97%	12,386
Orange	9,841	47.70%	9,968	48.32%	647	3.14%	175	0.85%	-127	-0.62%	20,631
Orleans	2,907	38.04%	3,997	52.31%	669	8.76%	68	0.89%	-1,090	-14.27%	7,641
Oswego	7,434	40.77%	9,976	54.71%	560	3.07%	265	1.45%	-2,542	-13.94%	18,235
Otsego	7,307	49.73%	6,871	46.76%	432	2.94%	84	0.57%	436	2.97%	14,694
Putnam	1,526	41.00%	2,103	56.50%	89	2.39%	4	0.11%	-577	-15.50%	3,722
Queens	10,367	53.76%	8,445	43.80%	201	1.04%	270	1.40%	1,922	9.97%	19,283
Rensselaer	13,414	47.44%	13,759	48.66%	416	1.47%	686	2.43%	-345	-1.22%	28,275
Richmond	5,135	60.68%	3,164	37.39%	89	1.05%	75	0.89%	1,971	23.29%	8,463
Rockland	3,697	57.40%	2,593	40.26%	123	1.91%	28	0.43%	1,104	17.14%	6,441
Saratoga	5,846	40.17%	8,190	56.28%	425	2.92%	92	0.63%	-2,344	-16.11%	14,553
Schenectady	2,977	46.64%	3,260	51.07%	105	1.64%	41	0.64%	-283	-4.43%	6,382
Schoharie	5,339	59.18%	3,472	38.49%	173	1.92%	37	0.41%	1,867	20.70%	9,021
Schuyler	2,039	41.44%	2,616	53.17%	154	3.13%	111	2.26%	-577	-11.73%	4,920
Seneca	3,627	50.98%	3,309	46.51%	119	1.67%	59	0.83%	318	4.47%	7,114
St. Lawrence	6,035	30.47%	13,441	67.86%	311	1.57%	20	0.10%	-7,406	-37.39%	19,807
Steuben	9,060	43.98%	10,048	48.78%	904	4.39%	587	2.85%	-988	-4.80%	20,599
Suffolk	6,429	50.17%	5,876	45.85%	457	3.57%	53	0.41%	553	4.32%	12,815
Sullivan	3,607	49.05%	3,332	45.31%	183	2.49%	232	3.15%	275	3.74%	7,354
Tioga	3,379	40.46%	4,367	52.29%	401	4.80%	204	2.44%	-988	-11.83%	8,351
Tompkins	3,992	44.10%	4,420	48.83%	267	2.95%	373	4.12%	-428	-4.73%	9,052
Ulster	9,870	48.42%	9,929	48.71%	429	2.10%	157	0.77%	-59	-0.29%	20,385
Warren	2,793	41.86%	3,577	53.61%	123	1.84%	179	2.68%	-784	-11.75%	6,672
Washington	4,222	35.39%	7,337	61.51%	255	2.14%	115	0.96%	-3,115	-26.11%	11,929
Wayne	4,730	37.91%	6,843	54.84%	433	3.47%	471	3.77%	-2,113	-16.94%	12,477
Westchester	12,524	51.13%	11,286	46.08%	435	1.78%	248	1.01%	1,238	5.06%	24,494
Wyoming	3,189	39.05%	4,441	54.38%	483	5.91%	53	0.65%	-1,252	-15.33%	8,166
Yates	1,918	35.26%	3,191	58.67%	200	3.68%	130	2.39%	-1,273	-23.41%	5,439
Totals	563,154	48.25%	562,005	48.15%	25,006	2.14%	17,004	1.46%	1,149	0.10%	1,167,169

==== Counties that flipped from Republican to Democratic ====
- Niagara
- Oneida
- Suffolk

==== Counties that flipped from Democratic to Republican ====
- Chemung
- Greene

== See also ==
- United States presidential elections in New York
