= 1936 United States presidential election in New York =

- November 3, 1936
- Turnout: 72.6% ▲6.5 pp

Nominee	Franklin D. Roosevelt	Alf Landon
Party	Democratic	Republican
Alliance	American Labor
Home state	New York	Kansas
Running mate	John Nance Garner	Frank Knox
Electoral vote	47	0
Popular vote	3,293,222	2,180,670
Percentage	58.85%	38.97%
County results
Roosevelt
40–50%
50–60%
60–70%
70–80%
Landon
40–50%
50–60%
60–70%
70–80%
President before election
Franklin D. Roosevelt
Democratic
Elected President
Franklin D. Roosevelt
Democratic

The 1936 United States presidential election in New York took place on November 3, 1936. All contemporary 48 states were part of the 1936 United States presidential election. Voters chose 47 electors to the Electoral College, which selected the president and vice president. New York was won by incumbent Democratic President Franklin D. Roosevelt of New York, who was running against Republican Governor of Kansas Alf Landon. Roosevelt ran with incumbent Vice President John Nance Garner of Texas, and Landon ran with newspaper publisher Frank Knox of Illinois.

A former Governor of New York who had easily carried the state four years earlier, Franklin Roosevelt won New York State in 1936 by an even more decisive margin. Roosevelt took 58.85% of the vote versus Alf Landon's 38.97%, a margin of 19.88%. Despite being Roosevelt's home state, in the context of the 1936 nationwide Democratic landslide, New York weighed in for this election as 4% more Republican than the national average, although FDR won the state by nearly 20 points.

Roosevelt won his home state by means of a dominance of the massively populated New York City area, performing even more strongly than he had in 1932. Roosevelt took over 70% of the vote in the boroughs of Manhattan, Brooklyn and the Bronx, and took over 60% of the vote in Queens and Staten Island. For the era, this was an historically overwhelming victory for a Democratic presidential candidate in the five boroughs of New York City, and enough to easily secure a statewide win for Roosevelt. The emergence of the New Deal Coalition was at its peak in 1936, and made American cities with their powerful political machines core bases of support for the Democratic Party. The Great Depression had accelerated the process of urbanization of the Democratic Party which had begun with the election of 1928. Roosevelt's landslide win in New York City was a fruit born by this process, and over the whole nation, he achieved majorities in the largest cities totaling twice what Harding had achieved in 1920. FDR's 1936 victory in New York State would also be the strongest statewide Democratic performance ever in terms of both margin and vote share until 1964.

== Results ==
1936 United States presidential election in New York
Party	Candidate	Votes	Percentage	Electoral votes
Democratic	Franklin D. Roosevelt	3,018,298	53.93%	
American Labor	Franklin D. Roosevelt	274,924	4.91%	
Total	Franklin D. Roosevelt (incumbent)	3,293,222	58.85%	47
Republican	Alf Landon	2,180,670	38.97%	0
Socialist	Norman Thomas	86,897	1.55%	0
Communist	Earl Browder	35,609	0.64%	0
Totals		5,596,398	100.00%	47

=== New York City results ===
1936 Presidential Election in New York City		Manhattan	The Bronx	Brooklyn	Queens	Staten Island	Total	
Democratic- American Labor	Franklin D. Roosevelt	517,134	419,625	738,306	320,053	46,229	2,041,347	73.49%
Democratic- American Labor	Franklin D. Roosevelt	72.71%	79.35%	75.78%	64.92%	65.68%	2,041,347	73.49%
Republican	Alf Landon	174,299	93,151	212,852	162,797	22,852	665,951	23.97%
Republican	Alf Landon	24.51%	17.61%	21.85%	33.02%	32.47%	665,951	23.97%
Socialist	Norman Thomas	10,529	6,892	11,647	8,314	1,138	38,520	1.39%
Socialist	Norman Thomas	1.48%	1.30%	1.20%	1.69%	1.62%	38,520	1.39%
Communist	Earl Browder	9,291	9,150	11,496	1,845	170	31,952	1.15%
Communist	Earl Browder	1.31%	1.73%	1.18%	0.37%	0.24%	31,952	1.15%
TOTAL		711,253	528,818	974,301	493,009	70,389	2,777,770	100.00%

=== Results by county ===
County	Franklin D. Roosevelt Democratic/American Labor		Alf Landon Republican		Normal Thomas Socialist		Earl Browder Communist		Margin		Total votes cast
County	#	%	#	%	#	%	#	%	#	%	Total votes cast
Albany	71,631	56.18%	52,962	41.54%	2,834	2.22%	84	0.07%	18,669	14.64%	127,511
Allegany	5,288	27.11%	13,829	70.89%	375	1.92%	16	0.08%	-8,541	-43.78%	19,508
Bronx	419,625	79.35%	93,151	17.61%	6,892	1.30%	9,150	1.73%	326,474	61.74%	528,818
Broome	29,708	43.94%	36,945	54.65%	850	1.26%	100	0.15%	-7,237	-10.71%	67,603
Cattaraugus	11,901	36.08%	20,484	62.10%	577	1.75%	22	0.07%	-8,583	-26.02%	32,984
Cayuga	12,158	36.62%	20,203	60.85%	822	2.48%	17	0.05%	-8,045	-24.23%	33,200
Chautauqua	23,283	42.39%	30,435	55.41%	1,128	2.05%	81	0.15%	-7,152	-13.02%	54,927
Chemung	15,542	42.94%	20,515	56.68%	122	0.34%	16	0.04%	-4,973	-13.74%	36,195
Chenango	5,143	27.08%	13,772	72.50%	73	0.38%	7	0.04%	-8,629	-45.43%	18,995
Clinton	10,898	50.60%	10,521	48.85%	110	0.51%	9	0.04%	377	1.75%	21,538
Columbia	8,375	38.64%	13,034	60.14%	236	1.09%	28	0.13%	-4,659	-21.50%	21,673
Cortland	4,606	27.69%	11,718	70.43%	303	1.82%	10	0.06%	-7,112	-42.75%	16,637
Delaware	6,142	28.75%	15,164	70.98%	58	0.27%	0	0.00%	-9,022	-42.23%	21,364
Dutchess	24,467	45.02%	28,868	53.12%	922	1.70%	88	0.16%	-4,401	-8.10%	54,345
Erie	183,555	53.64%	152,312	44.51%	5,750	1.68%	591	0.17%	31,243	9.13%	342,208
Essex	5,447	31.88%	11,599	67.88%	39	0.23%	3	0.02%	-6,152	-36.00%	17,088
Franklin	8,799	42.97%	11,521	56.26%	147	0.72%	11	0.05%	-2,722	-13.29%	20,478
Fulton	8,977	37.82%	14,253	60.05%	466	1.96%	41	0.17%	-5,276	-22.23%	23,737
Genesee	6,177	30.78%	13,292	66.23%	583	2.90%	17	0.08%	-7,115	-35.45%	20,069
Greene	6,744	41.99%	9,060	56.41%	247	1.54%	9	0.06%	-2,316	-14.42%	16,060
Hamilton	934	35.53%	1,695	64.47%	0	0.00%	0	0.00%	-761	-28.95%	2,629
Herkimer	12,847	44.10%	15,941	54.73%	321	1.10%	20	0.07%	-3,094	-10.62%	29,129
Jefferson	13,975	35.41%	24,925	63.16%	543	1.38%	23	0.06%	-10,950	-27.75%	39,466
Kings	738,306	75.78%	212,852	21.85%	11,647	1.20%	11,496	1.18%	525,454	53.93%	974,301
Lewis	3,263	28.56%	8,048	70.44%	108	0.95%	7	0.06%	-4,785	-41.88%	11,426
Livingston	6,088	32.12%	12,353	65.18%	503	2.65%	9	0.05%	-6,265	-33.06%	18,953
Madison	5,867	28.49%	14,353	69.71%	353	1.71%	17	0.08%	-8,486	-41.21%	20,590
Monroe	114,286	54.29%	93,055	44.20%	2,715	1.29%	467	0.22%	21,231	10.08%	210,523
Montgomery	14,698	50.44%	14,127	48.48%	286	0.98%	28	0.10%	571	1.96%	29,139
Nassau	74,232	42.96%	94,968	54.97%	3,301	1.91%	278	0.16%	-20,736	-12.00%	172,779
New York	517,134	72.71%	174,299	24.51%	10,529	1.48%	9,291	1.31%	342,835	48.20%	711,253
Niagara	29,207	47.56%	30,144	49.08%	1,965	3.20%	99	0.16%	-937	-1.53%	61,415
Oneida	43,439	47.68%	46,317	50.84%	1,244	1.37%	111	0.12%	-2,878	-3.16%	91,111
Onondaga	62,945	43.03%	80,498	55.03%	2,639	1.80%	188	0.13%	-17,553	-12.00%	146,270
Ontario	8,787	32.29%	17,812	65.45%	604	2.22%	12	0.04%	-9,025	-33.16%	27,215
Orange	27,528	43.50%	34,428	54.41%	1,271	2.01%	49	0.08%	-6,900	-10.90%	63,276
Orleans	4,016	26.78%	10,569	70.49%	398	2.65%	11	0.07%	-6,553	-43.70%	14,994
Oswego	11,068	32.20%	22,803	66.33%	484	1.41%	21	0.06%	-11,735	-34.14%	34,376
Otsego	7,807	31.52%	16,682	67.36%	266	1.07%	10	0.04%	-8,875	-35.84%	24,765
Putnam	4,682	44.03%	5,761	54.18%	177	1.66%	13	0.12%	-1,079	-10.15%	10,633
Queens	320,053	64.92%	162,797	33.02%	8,314	1.69%	1,845	0.37%	157,256	31.90%	493,009
Rensselaer	31,754	46.27%	34,772	50.67%	2,024	2.95%	71	0.10%	-3,018	-4.40%	68,621
Richmond	46,229	65.68%	22,852	32.47%	1,138	1.62%	170	0.24%	23,377	33.21%	70,389
Rockland	15,876	49.47%	15,583	48.56%	574	1.79%	57	0.18%	293	0.91%	32,090
Saratoga	14,619	42.66%	19,153	55.90%	475	1.39%	19	0.06%	-4,534	-13.23%	34,266
Schenectady	31,027	52.23%	26,914	45.30%	1,361	2.29%	105	0.18%	4,113	6.92%	59,407
Schoharie	4,229	36.99%	6,895	60.30%	301	2.63%	9	0.08%	-2,666	-23.32%	11,434
Schuyler	2,551	34.22%	4,819	64.64%	75	1.01%	10	0.13%	-2,268	-30.42%	7,455
Seneca	4,295	34.49%	7,919	63.59%	232	1.86%	8	0.06%	-3,624	-29.10%	12,454
St. Lawrence	12,763	32.27%	26,031	65.81%	736	1.86%	26	0.07%	-13,268	-33.54%	39,556
Steuben	14,978	36.70%	24,987	61.23%	821	2.01%	24	0.06%	-10,009	-24.53%	40,810
Suffolk	33,078	39.22%	48,970	58.07%	2,187	2.59%	100	0.12%	-15,892	-18.84%	84,335
Sullivan	9,908	49.58%	9,757	48.83%	256	1.28%	61	0.31%	151	0.76%	19,982
Tioga	4,305	31.56%	9,163	67.18%	150	1.10%	22	0.16%	-4,858	-35.62%	13,640
Tompkins	7,007	33.78%	13,332	64.26%	374	1.80%	33	0.16%	-6,325	-30.49%	20,746
Ulster	19,118	42.85%	24,678	55.32%	762	1.71%	53	0.12%	-5,560	-12.46%	44,611
Warren	6,807	34.26%	12,873	64.78%	182	0.92%	9	0.05%	-6,066	-30.53%	19,871
Washington	7,713	33.08%	15,186	65.13%	406	1.74%	12	0.05%	-7,473	-32.05%	23,317
Wayne	7,099	27.80%	17,901	70.11%	516	2.02%	18	0.07%	-10,802	-42.30%	25,534
Westchester	123,561	47.24%	133,670	51.10%	3,841	1.47%	497	0.19%	-10,109	-3.86%	261,569
Wyoming	4,420	29.78%	10,253	69.09%	162	1.09%	6	0.04%	-5,833	-39.30%	14,841
Yates	2,257	24.32%	6,897	74.32%	122	1.31%	4	0.04%	-4,640	-50.00%	9,280
Totals	3,293,222	58.85%	2,180,670	38.97%	86,897	1.55%	35,609	0.64%	1,112,552	19.88%	5,596,398

==== Counties that flipped from Democratic to Republican ====
- Franklin
- Rensselaer

==== Counties that flipped from Republican to Democratic ====
- Montgomery
- Monroe
- Rockland
- Schenectady
- Erie

== Analysis ==
In upstate New York, Roosevelt's support was mostly concentrated in the cities. Roosevelt again carried Albany County, home to the state capital of Albany, which since 1928 had become a Democratic stronghold of a city. Nearby Schenectady and Montgomery counties went Democratic as well. Montgomery County had not voted Democratic since 1876. 1936 also saw FDR flip Erie County into the Democratic column, home to the city of Buffalo in western New York, which up to that point was a Republican county that had even held for Herbert Hoover in 1932. Finally flipping in 1936, Buffalo has largely remained a loyal Democratic bastion ever since. Monroe County, home to the city of Rochester, also swung from voting for Hoover in 1932 to Roosevelt in 1936. Roosevelt's other wins in the state were pluralities in Rockland County and Sullivan County.

However, much of rural upstate New York remained one of the most loyally Republican regions in the nation throughout the FDR era, which many locals attributed to the fact that New Deal public works had barely affected these regions. Going against the trend of both the state and the nation, FDR lost Franklin County to Landon in northern New York, a county which FDR had won in 1932 and which was even won by Al Smith in 1928, leaving Clinton County as the sole Democratic win in the North Country region of the state in 1936. Roosevelt also lost Rensselaer County to Landon in the Capital District, despite Roosevelt having won Rensselaer in 1932 and Smith winning there in 1928.

The rural Midwest, rural upstate New York and Unionist parts of Appalachia have been the consistent bastions of the Republican Party since the Civil War. 1936 was the third and final election in a row in which Democrats had won all five boroughs of New York City. This was the last election in which Democrats won the boroughs of Queens until 1960, and Staten Island or simultaneously carried all five boroughs of New York City until 1964.

== See also ==
- United States presidential elections in New York
- Presidency of Franklin D. Roosevelt
