= 1836 United States presidential election in New York =

- November 7–9, 1836
- Turnout: 70.5% ▼13.7 pp
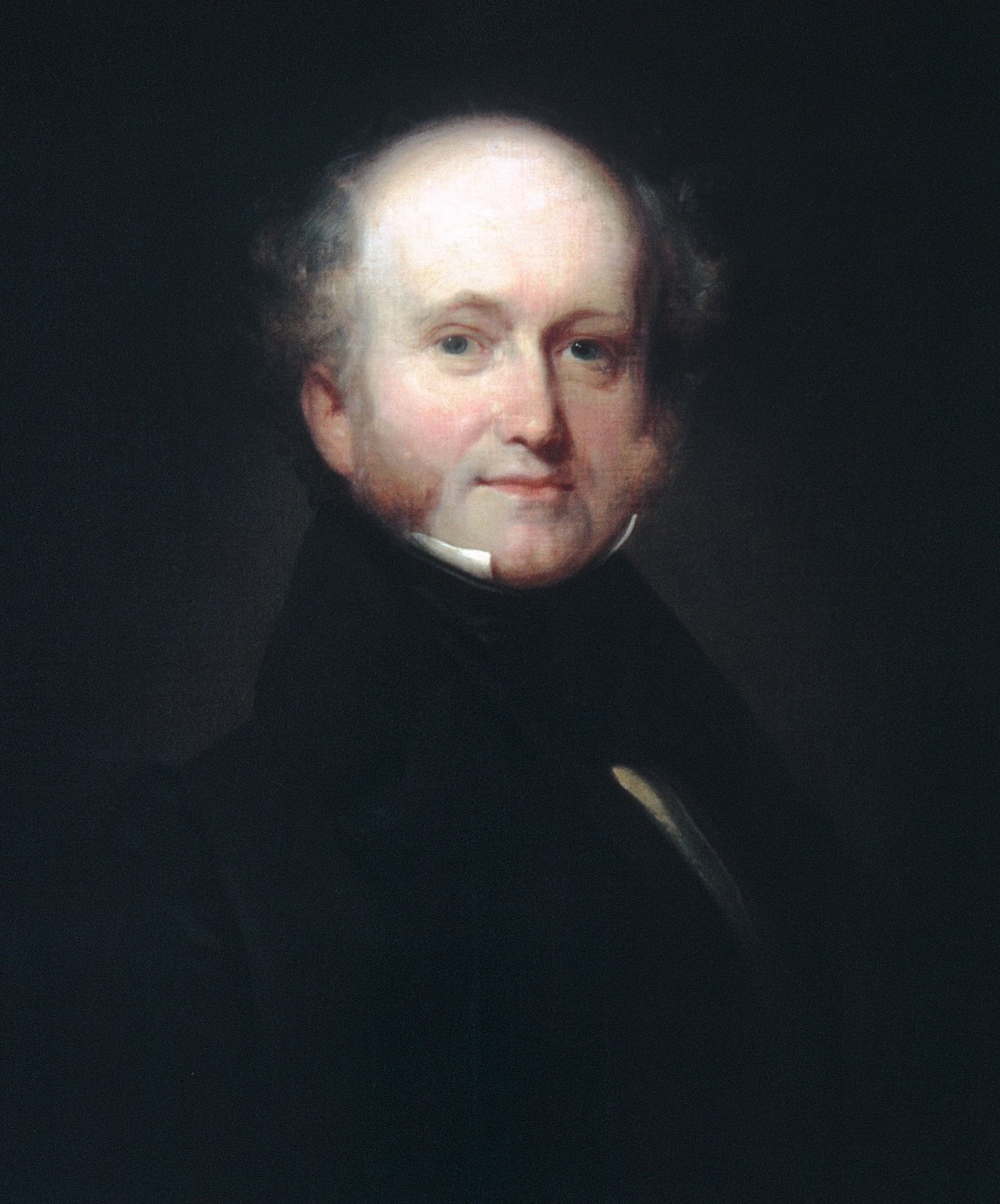

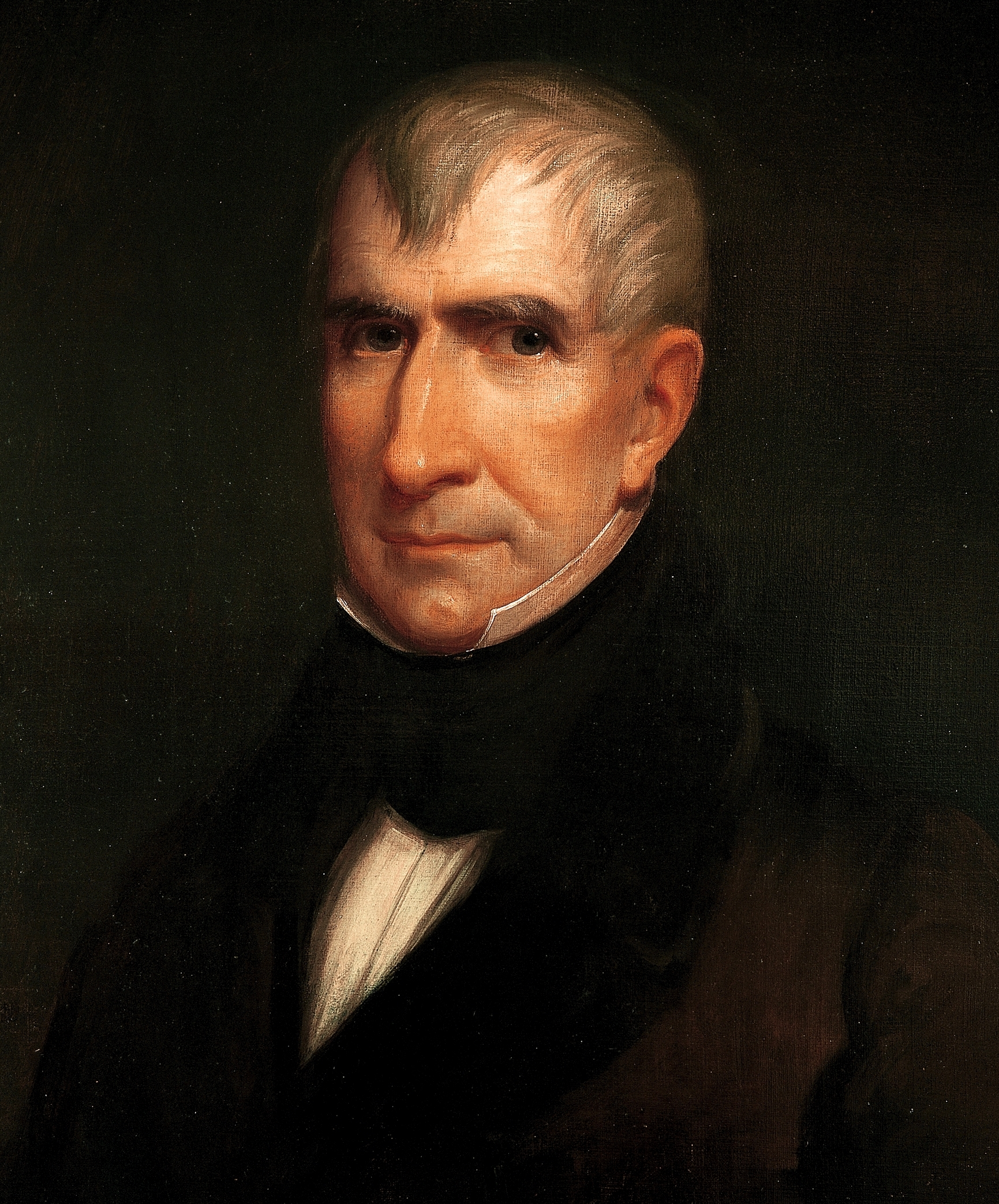
| Nominee | Martin Van Buren | William Henry Harrison |
| Party | Democratic | Whig |
| Home state | New York | Ohio |
| Running mate | Richard Mentor Johnson | Francis Granger |
| Electoral vote | 42 | 0 |
| Popular vote | 166,886 | 138,765 |
| Percentage | 54.60% | 45.40% |
County results
Van Buren
50–60%
60–70%
70–80%
Harrison
50–60%
60–70%
Tie
President before election
Andrew Jackson
Democratic
Elected President
Martin Van Buren
Democratic

A presidential election was held in New York from November 7–9, 1836 as part of the 1836 United States presidential election. Voters chose 42 representatives, or electors to the Electoral College, who voted for President and Vice President.

New York voted for the Democratic candidate, Martin Van Buren, over Whig candidate William Henry Harrison. Van Buren won New York by a margin of 9.26%. Saratoga County would not vote Democratic again until 1964.

== Results ==
1836 United States presidential election in New York (Note: Since New York voted for presidential electors directly, the totals below are based on the highest elector on each ticket.)
| Party | Candidate | Running mate | Popular vote | | Electoral vote | |
| Party | Candidate | Running mate | Count | % | Count | % |
|---|---|---|---|---|---|---|
| Democratic | Martin Van Buren of New York | Richard Mentor Johnson of Kentucky | 166,886 | 54.60% | 42 | 100.00% |
| Whig | William Henry Harrison of Ohio | Francis Granger of New York | 138,765 | 45.40% | 0 | 0.00% |
| Total | | | 305,651 | 100.00% | 42 | 100.00% |

=== Results by county ===
| County | Martin Van Buren Democratic | | William Henry Harrison Whig | | Margin | | Total votes cast |
| County | # | % | # | % | # | % | Total votes cast |
|---|---|---|---|---|---|---|---|
| Albany | 4,947 | 53.73% | 4,261 | 46.27% | 686 | 7.45% | 9,208 |
| Allegany | 2,615 | 49.24% | 2,696 | 50.76% | -81 | -1.53% | 5,311 |
| Broome | 1,642 | 52.85% | 1,465 | 47.15% | 177 | 5.70% | 3,107 |
| Cattaraugus | 1,888 | 55.91% | 1,489 | 44.09% | 399 | 11.82% | 3,377 |
| Cayuga | 4,284 | 53.50% | 3,724 | 46.50% | 560 | 6.99% | 8,008 |
| Chautauqua | 3,120 | 44.48% | 3,895 | 55.52% | -775 | -11.05% | 7,015 |
| Chemung | 1,724 | 63.29% | 1,000 | 36.71% | 724 | 26.58% | 2,724 |
| Chenango | 3,611 | 56.91% | 2,734 | 43.09% | 877 | 13.82% | 6,345 |
| Clinton | 1,331 | 60.92% | 854 | 39.08% | 477 | 21.83% | 2,185 |
| Columbia | 3,767 | 55.25% | 3,051 | 44.75% | 716 | 10.50% | 6,818 |
| Cortland | 1,724 | 46.08% | 2,017 | 53.92% | -293 | -7.83% | 3,741 |
| Delaware | 2,823 | 77.92% | 800 | 22.08% | 2,023 | 55.84% | 3,623 |
| Dutchess | 3,981 | 62.72% | 2,366 | 37.28% | 1,615 | 25.45% | 6,347 |
| Erie | 2,661 | 35.28% | 4,882 | 64.72% | -2,221 | -29.44% | 7,543 |
| Essex | 1,603 | 46.36% | 1,855 | 53.64% | -252 | -7.29% | 3,458 |
| Franklin | 862 | 48.65% | 910 | 51.35% | -48 | -2.71% | 1,772 |
| Genesee | 3,271 | 38.24% | 5,282 | 61.76% | -2,011 | -23.51% | 8,553 |
| Greene | 2,976 | 61.25% | 1,883 | 38.75% | 1,093 | 22.49% | 4,859 |
| Herkimer | 3,036 | 71.94% | 1,184 | 28.06% | 1,852 | 43.89% | 4,220 |
| Jefferson | 4,595 | 54.99% | 3,761 | 45.01% | 834 | 9.98% | 8,356 |
| Kings | 2,323 | 55.43% | 1,868 | 44.57% | 455 | 10.86% | 4,191 |
| Lewis | 1,096 | 72.73% | 411 | 27.27% | 685 | 45.45% | 1,507 |
| Livingston | 1,902 | 41.85% | 2,643 | 58.15% | -741 | -16.30% | 4,545 |
| Madison | 2,909 | 63.07% | 1,703 | 36.93% | 1,206 | 26.15% | 4,612 |
| Monroe | 3,931 | 44.58% | 4,887 | 55.42% | -956 | -10.84% | 8,818 |
| Montgomery (Note: Includes Hamilton County) | 4,303 | 57.58% | 3,170 | 42.42% | 1,133 | 15.16% | 7,473 |
| New York | 17,469 | 51.66% | 16,348 | 48.34% | 1,121 | 3.31% | 33,817 |
| Niagara | 2,143 | 48.59% | 2,267 | 51.41% | -124 | -2.81% | 4,410 |
| Oneida | 5,476 | 60.20% | 3,621 | 39.80% | 1,855 | 20.39% | 9,097 |
| Onondaga | 4,776 | 61.57% | 2,981 | 38.43% | 1,795 | 23.14% | 7,757 |
| Ontario | 2,732 | 44.30% | 3,435 | 55.70% | -703 | -11.40% | 6,167 |
| Orange | 3,541 | 61.23% | 2,242 | 38.77% | 1,299 | 22.46% | 5,783 |
| Orleans | 1,825 | 49.54% | 1,859 | 50.46% | -34 | -0.92% | 3,684 |
| Oswego | 3,105 | 61.47% | 1,946 | 38.53% | 1,159 | 22.95% | 5,051 |
| Otsego | 4,627 | 65.21% | 2,469 | 34.79% | 2,158 | 30.41% | 7,096 |
| Putnam | 818 | 77.61% | 236 | 22.39% | 582 | 55.22% | 1,054 |
| Queens | 1,654 | 54.18% | 1,399 | 45.82% | 255 | 8.35% | 3,053 |
| Rensselaer | 4,983 | 51.81% | 4,634 | 48.19% | 349 | 3.63% | 9,617 |
| Richmond | 649 | 50.00% | 649 | 50.00% | 0 | 0.00% | 1,298 |
| Rockland | 1,045 | 73.80% | 371 | 26.20% | 674 | 47.60% | 1,416 |
| Saratoga | 3,338 | 52.56% | 3,013 | 47.44% | 325 | 5.12% | 6,351 |
| Schenectady | 1,480 | 56.30% | 1,149 | 43.70% | 331 | 12.59% | 2,629 |
| Schoharie | 2,437 | 63.15% | 1,422 | 36.85% | 1,015 | 26.30% | 3,859 |
| Seneca | 2,036 | 57.56% | 1,501 | 42.44% | 535 | 15.13% | 3,537 |
| St. Lawrence | 3,089 | 58.02% | 2,235 | 41.98% | 854 | 16.04% | 5,324 |
| Steuben | 3,650 | 60.49% | 2,384 | 39.51% | 1,266 | 20.98% | 6,034 |
| Suffolk | 2,071 | 66.63% | 1,037 | 33.37% | 1,034 | 33.27% | 3,108 |
| Sullivan | 1,227 | 59.56% | 833 | 40.44% | 394 | 19.13% | 2,060 |
| Tioga | 1,626 | 56.48% | 1,253 | 43.52% | 373 | 12.96% | 2,879 |
| Tompkins | 2,935 | 51.30% | 2,786 | 48.70% | 149 | 2.60% | 5,721 |
| Ulster | 3,658 | 62.80% | 2,167 | 37.20% | 1,491 | 25.60% | 5,825 |
| Warren | 1,316 | 69.78% | 570 | 30.22% | 746 | 39.55% | 1,886 |
| Washington | 2,592 | 41.91% | 3,593 | 58.09% | -1,001 | -16.18% | 6,185 |
| Wayne | 2,968 | 52.80% | 2,653 | 47.20% | 315 | 5.60% | 5,621 |
| Westchester | 3,009 | 63.24% | 1,749 | 36.76% | 1,260 | 26.48% | 4,758 |
| Yates | 1,686 | 58.99% | 1,172 | 41.01% | 514 | 17.98% | 2,858 |
| Total | 166,886 | 54.60% | 138,765 | 45.40% | 28,121 | 9.20% | 305,651 |

==== Counties that flipped from National Republican to Democratic ====
- Broome
- Cattaraugus
- Jefferson
- Madison

==== Counties that flipped from Democratic to Tied ====
- Richmond

== See also ==
- United States presidential elections in New York
