= 1856 United States presidential election in New York =

- November 4, 1856
- Turnout: 89.9% ▲5.2 pp
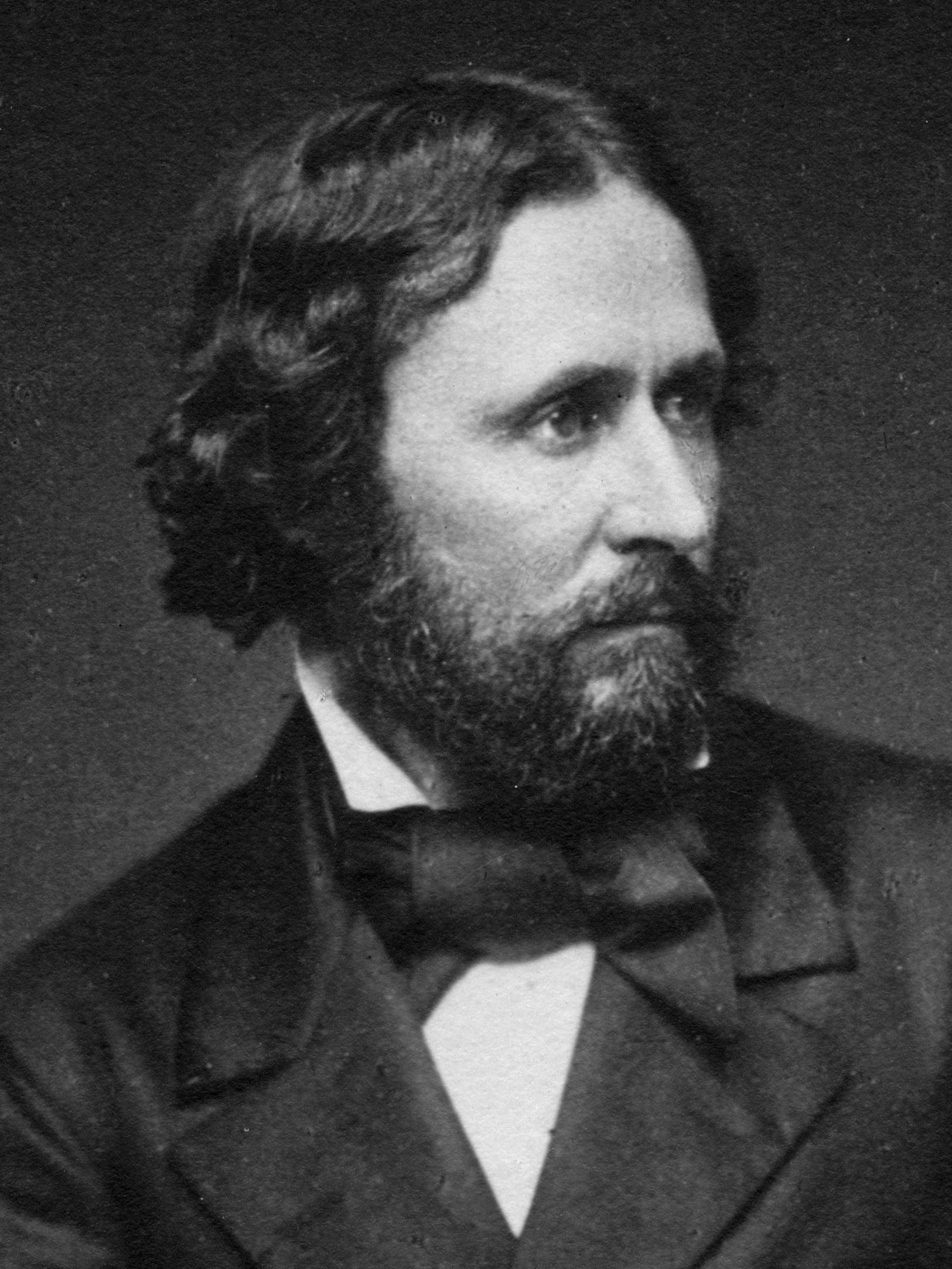

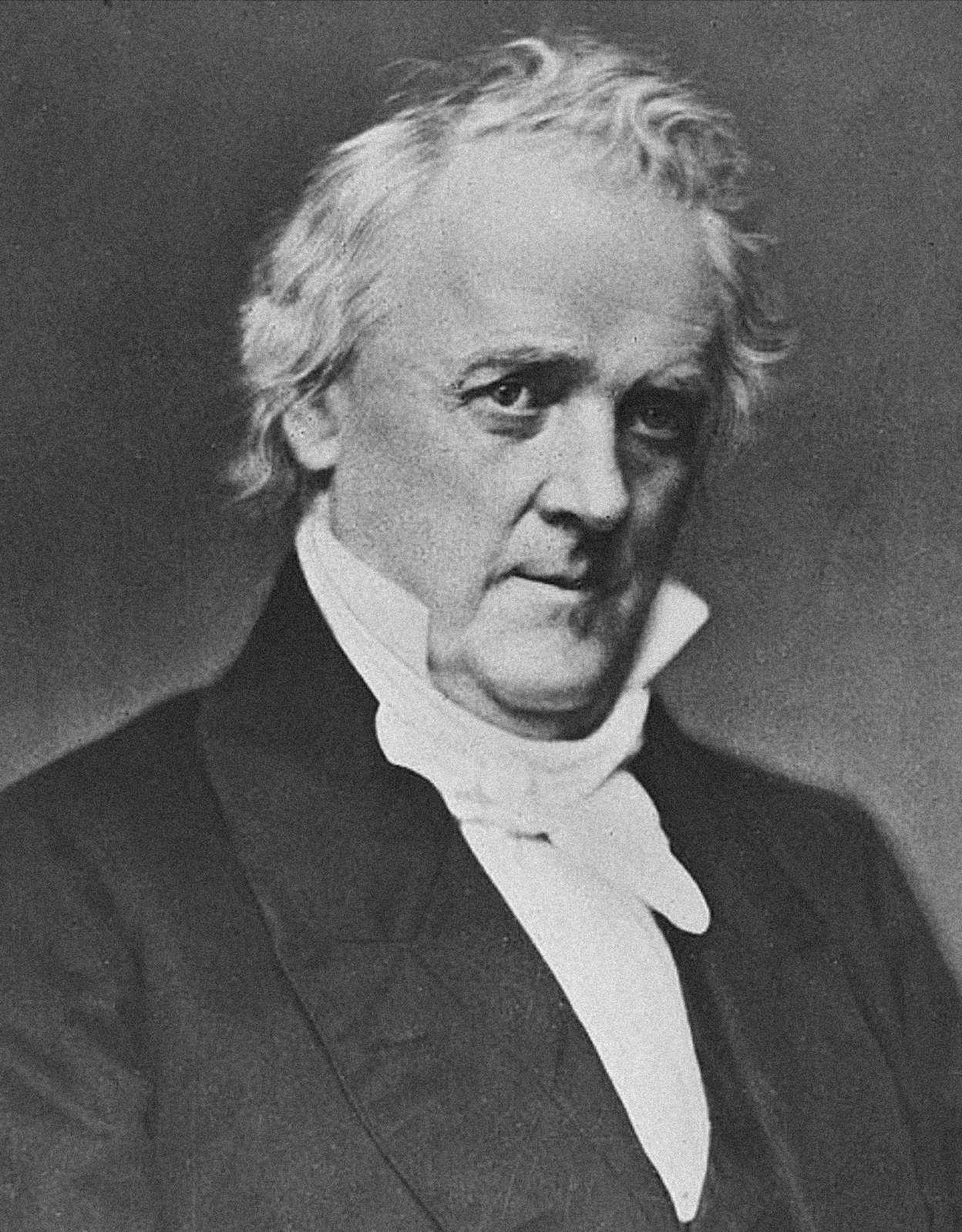

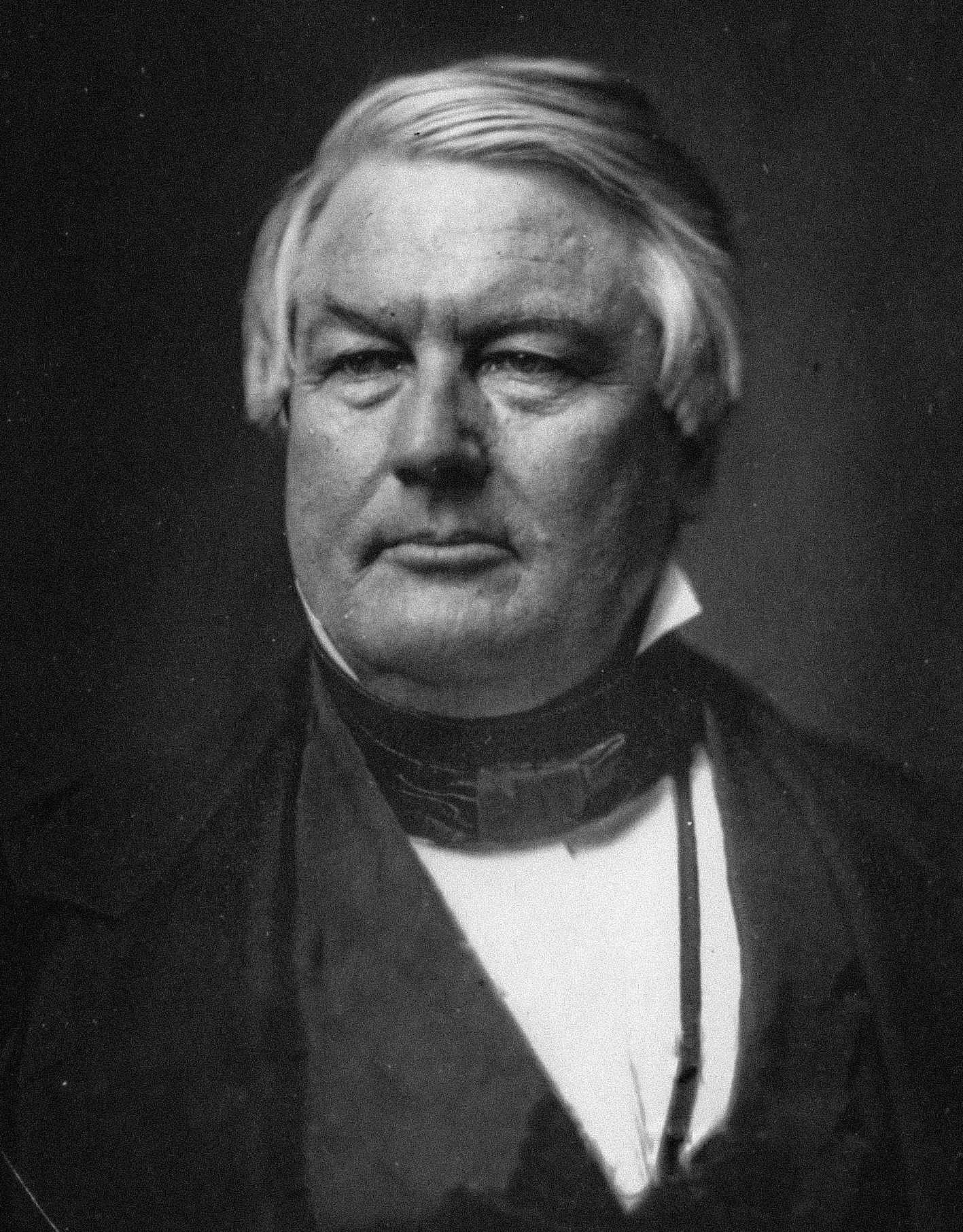
Nominee	John C. Frémont	James Buchanan	Millard Fillmore
Party	Republican	Democratic	American
Home state	California	Pennsylvania	New York
Running mate	William L. Dayton	John C. Breckinridge	Andrew Jackson Donelson
Electoral vote	35	0	0
Popular vote	274,705	195,878	124,647
Percentage	46.14%	32.90%	20.94%
County results
Fremont
30–40%
40–50%
50–60%
60–70%
70–80%
Buchanan
30–40%
40–50%
50–60%
Fillmore
30–40%
40–50%
President before election
Franklin Pierce
Democratic
Elected President
James Buchanan
Democratic

The 1856 United States presidential election in New York took place on November 4, 1856, as part of the 1856 United States presidential election. Voters chose 35 representatives, or electors to the Electoral College, who voted for president and vice president.

New York was won by California Senator John C. Frémont (R–California), running with former Senator William L. Dayton (New Jersey), with 46.27 percent of the popular vote, against Senator James Buchanan (D–Pennsylvania), running with Representative and future presidential candidate in the 1860 presidential election John C. Breckinridge, with 32.84 percent of the popular vote and the 13th president of the United States Millard Fillmore (American (Note: In New York Fillmore and Donelson ran under the official name of American Party.)–New York), running with the 2nd U.S. Ambassador to Germany Andrew Jackson Donelson, with 20.89 percent of the popular vote.

James Buchanan went on to win the presidential election, but a Democrat would not win New York again until Horatio Seymour's narrow victory in 1868. Frémont, the first presidential nominee of the newly formed Republican Party, would be the first of just three Republicans ever to carry the state without winning the presidency, the other two being New Yorkers Charles Evans Hughes in 1916 and Thomas E. Dewey in 1948.

It was also the first time since voting for DeWitt Clinton in 1812 that New York backed a losing presidential candidate. This remains the only presidential election in history where New York voted Republican while neighboring Pennsylvania voted Democratic, although New York would vote more Republican than Pennsylvania in the Republican landslides of 1952, 1956, and 1984.

== Results ==
1856 United States presidential election in New York (Note: Since New York voted for presidential electors directly, the totals below are based on the highest elector on each ticket.)
Party	Candidate	Running mate	Popular vote		Electoral vote	
Party	Candidate	Running mate	Count	%	Count	%
Republican	John C. Frémont of California	William L. Dayton of New Jersey	274,705 (Note: This is the official total of the highest Republican elector, as reported by the state Board of Canvassers. The board excluded about 1,300 Republican votes in New York City.)	46.14%	35	100.00%
Democratic	James Buchanan of Pennsylvania	John C. Breckinridge of Kentucky	195,878	32.90%	0	0.00%
Know Nothing	Millard Fillmore of New York	Andrew Jackson Donelson of Tennessee	124,647	20.94%	0	0.00%
Radical Abolitionist	Gerrit Smith of New York	Samuel McFarland of Pennsylvania	165	0.03%	0	0.00%
Total			595,395	100.00%	35	100.00%

=== Results by county ===
County	John C. Frémont Republican		James Buchanan Democratic		Millard Fillmore American		Gerrit Smith Radical Abolitionist		Margin		Total votes cast
County	#	%	#	%	#	%	#	%	#	%	Total votes cast
Albany	5,016	27.76%	7,751	42.90%	5,301	29.34%	1	0.01%	2,450 (Note: In this county where Frémont ran third behind Buchanan and Fillmore, margin given is Buchanan vote minus Fillmore vote and percentage margin Buchanan percentage minus Fillmore percentage.)	13.56%	18,069
Allegany	6,545	72.37%	1,640	18.13%	856	9.46%	3	0.03%	4,905	54.23%	9,044
Broome	4,297	59.71%	2,106	29.27%	791	10.99%	2	0.03%	2,191	30.45%	7,196
Cattaraugus	5,166	65.21%	1,773	22.38%	978	12.35%	5	0.06%	3,393	42.83%	7,922
Cayuga	7,035	65.26%	1,818	16.86%	1,924	17.85%	3	0.03%	5,112 (Note: In this county where Buchanan ran third behind both Frémont and Fillmore, margin given is Frémont vote minus Fillmore vote and percentage margin Frémont percentage minus Fillmore percentage.)	47.41%	10,780
Chautauqua	7,037	64.54%	1,847	16.94%	2,017	18.50%	2	0.02%	5,020	46.04%	10,903
Chemung	2,664	51.04%	1,789	34.28%	766	14.68%	0	0.00%	875	16.76%	5,219
Chenango	5,458	61.09%	2,406	26.93%	1,070	11.98%	0	0.00%	3,052	34.16%	8,934
Clinton	2,659	43.45%	2,134	34.87%	1,311	21.42%	16	0.26%	525	8.58%	6,120
Columbia	3,818	43.29%	3,020	34.24%	1,981	22.46%	0	0.00%	798	9.05%	8,819
Cortland	3,596	66.43%	1,181	21.82%	628	11.60%	8	0.15%	2,415	44.61%	5,413
Delaware	4,367	51.48%	2,107	24.84%	2,009	23.68%	0	0.00%	2,260	26.64%	8,483
Dutchess	5,512	47.67%	4,039	34.93%	2,013	17.41%	0	0.00%	1,473	12.74%	11,564
Erie	6,902	34.58%	7,536	37.76%	5,521	27.66%	0	0.00%	-634	-3.18%	19,959
Essex	2,904	57.69%	1,173	23.30%	956	18.99%	1	0.02%	1,731	34.39%	5,034
Franklin	1,469	34.86%	1,600	37.97%	1,145	27.17%	0	0.00%	-131	-3.11%	4,214
Fulton	2,593	51.84%	1,374	27.47%	1,034	20.67%	1	0.02%	1,219	24.37%	5,002
Genesee	3,620	58.76%	1,434	23.28%	1,107	17.97%	0	0.00%	2,186	35.48%	6,161
Greene	2,164	35.81%	2,346	38.82%	1,533	25.37%	0	0.00%	-182	-3.01%	6,043
Hamilton (Note: Voted with Fulton County)	149	28.88%	250	48.45%	117	22.67%	0	0.00%	-101	-19.57%	516
Herkimer	5,074	63.75%	1,650	20.73%	1,230	15.45%	5	0.06%	3,424	43.02%	7,959
Jefferson	8,249	64.42%	3,496	27.30%	1,058	8.26%	2	0.02%	4,753	37.12%	12,805
Kings	7,846	25.58%	14,174	46.21%	8,647	28.19%	4	0.01%	5,527	18.02%	30,671
Lewis	3,124	67.05%	1,114	23.91%	418	8.97%	3	0.06%	2,010	43.14%	4,659
Livingston	3,597	49.72%	1,652	22.83%	1,979	27.35%	7	0.10%	1,618	22.37%	7,235
Madison	6,312	69.72%	1,861	20.56%	865	9.55%	15	0.17%	4,451	49.17%	9,053
Monroe	7,584	49.44%	4,683	30.53%	3,069	20.01%	4	0.03%	2,901	18.91%	15,340
Montgomery	3,076	49.03%	1,485	23.67%	1,713	27.30%	0	0.00%	1,363	21.73%	6,274
New York	16,469	21.03%	41,913	53.52%	19,924	25.44%	0	0.00%	21,989	28.08%	78,306
Niagara	3,906	50.35%	1,864	24.03%	1,986	25.60%	1	0.01%	1,920	24.75%	7,757
Oneida	11,174	58.25%	6,386	33.29%	1,612	8.40%	10	0.05%	4,788	24.96%	19,182
Onondaga	10,071	62.83%	4,227	26.37%	1,724	10.76%	7	0.04%	5,844	36.46%	16,029
Ontario	4,551	54.23%	1,642	19.57%	2,189	26.08%	10	0.12%	2,362	28.15%	8,392
Orange	4,274	41.12%	3,948	37.98%	2,172	20.90%	0	0.00%	326	3.14%	10,394
Orleans	3,088	55.49%	1,052	18.90%	1,425	25.61%	0	0.00%	1,663	29.88%	5,565
Oswego	8,246	62.84%	3,683	28.07%	1,175	8.95%	19	0.14%	4,563	34.77%	13,123
Otsego	6,373	56.91%	3,595	32.10%	1,229	10.98%	1	0.01%	2,778	24.81%	11,198
Putnam	963	37.94%	1,096	43.18%	479	18.87%	0	0.00%	-133	-5.24%	2,538
Queens	1,886	27.72%	2,394	35.19%	2,523	37.09%	0	0.00%	-129	-1.90%	6,803
Rensselaer	5,153	36.50%	4,415	31.27%	4,551	32.23%	0	0.00%	602	4.27%	14,119
Richmond	736	22.77%	1,550	47.94%	947	29.29%	0	0.00%	603	18.65%	3,233
Rockland	668	21.34%	1,526	48.74%	937	29.93%	0	0.00%	589	18.81%	3,131
Saratoga	4,524	47.37%	2,446	25.61%	2,581	27.02%	0	0.00%	1,943	20.35%	9,551
Schenectady	1,714	46.15%	787	21.19%	1,213	32.66%	0	0.00%	501	13.49%	3,714
Schoharie	2,376	34.71%	2,837	41.45%	1,630	23.81%	2	0.03%	-461	-6.73%	6,845
Schuyler	2,542	63.81%	981	24.62%	461	11.57%	0	0.00%	1,561	39.19%	3,984
Seneca	2,163	42.76%	1,625	32.13%	1,265	25.01%	5	0.10%	538	10.64%	5,058
St. Lawrence	9,698	74.67%	1,950	15.01%	1,332	10.26%	8	0.06%	7,748	59.66%	12,988
Steuben	7,270	58.06%	3,217	25.69%	2,034	16.24%	0	0.00%	4,053	32.37%	12,521
Suffolk	2,393	37.28%	2,045	31.86%	1,980	30.85%	1	0.02%	348	5.42%	6,419
Sullivan	1,690	31.83%	1,583	29.81%	2,037	38.36%	0	0.00%	-347	-6.53%	5,310
Tioga	3,331	56.27%	2,154	36.39%	435	7.35%	0	0.00%	1,177	19.88%	5,920
Tompkins	4,019	58.09%	1,430	20.67%	1,470	21.25%	0	0.00%	2,549	36.84%	6,919
Ulster	2,932	25.14%	4,030	34.55%	4,703	40.32%	0	0.00%	-673	-5.77%	11,665
Warren	2,202	55.85%	1,006	25.51%	735	18.64%	0	0.00%	1,196	30.34%	3,943
Washington	5,174	59.74%	1,632	18.84%	1,848	21.34%	7	0.08%	3,326	38.40%	8,661
Wayne	5,776	62.56%	1,999	21.65%	1,450	15.71%	7	0.08%	3,777	40.91%	9,232
Westchester	4,450	35.06%	4,600	36.25%	3,641	28.69%	0	0.00%	-150	-1.19%	12,691
Wyoming	4,066	62.05%	1,911	29.16%	571	8.71%	5	0.08%	2,155	32.89%	6,553
Yates	2,994	70.28%	915	21.48%	351	8.24%	0	0.00%	2,079	48.80%	4,260
Totals	274,705	46.14%	195,878	32.90%	124,647	20.94%	165	0.03%	78,827	13.24%	595,395

==== Counties that flipped from Democratic to Republican ====
- Allegany
- Broome
- Cayuga
- Chemung
- Chenango
- Clinton
- Columbia
- Delaware
- Dutchess
- Herkimer
- Jefferson
- Lewis
- Madison
- Montgomery
- Oneida
- Onondaga
- Orange
- Oswego
- Otsego
- Rensselaer
- Schenectady
- Seneca
- St. Lawrence
- Steuben
- Suffolk
- Tioga
- Tompkins
- Warren
- Wayne
- Yates

==== Counties that flipped from Whig to Republican ====
- Cattaraugus
- Chautauqua
- Cortland
- Essex
- Fulton
- Genesee
- Livingston
- Monroe
- Niagara
- Ontario
- Orleans
- Saratoga
- Washington
- Wyoming

==== Counties that flipped from Whig to Democratic ====
- Erie

==== Counties that flipped from Democratic to American ====
- Queens
- Sullivan
- Ulster

== See also ==
- United States presidential elections in New York
