= 1964 United States presidential election in New York =

- November 3, 1964
- Turnout: 64.4% ▼2.5 pp

Nominee	Lyndon B. Johnson	Barry Goldwater
Party	Democratic	Republican
Alliance	Liberal
Home state	Texas	Arizona
Running mate	Hubert Humphrey	William E. Miller
Electoral vote	43	0
Popular vote	4,913,156	2,243,559
Percentage	68.56%	31.31%
County results
Johnson
50–60%
60–70%
70–80%
80–90%
President before election
Lyndon B. Johnson
Democratic
Elected President
Lyndon B. Johnson
Democratic

The 1964 United States presidential election in New York took place on November 3, 1964, as part of the 1964 United States presidential election in which all 50 states plus the District of Columbia participated. New York voters chose 43 electors to represent them in the Electoral College via a popular vote pitting incumbent Democratic President Lyndon B. Johnson and his running mate, President pro tempore of the Senate Hubert Humphrey, against Republican challenger and Senator Barry Goldwater from Arizona and his running mate and Chair of the Republican National Committee, William E. Miller.

Johnson carried the state in a historic landslide, taking 68.56% of the vote to Goldwater's 31.31%, a victory margin of 37.25%. This is the only election in history in which a Democratic presidential candidate carried every single county in the state of New York. The staunch conservative Barry Goldwater was widely seen in the liberal Northeast as a right-wing extremist; he had voted against the Civil Rights Act of 1964, and the Johnson campaign portrayed him as a warmonger who as president would provoke a nuclear war. Thus Goldwater performed especially weakly in northeastern states like New York: he wrote off the state and neighboring Connecticut, Massachusetts, Michigan, New Jersey, Pennsylvania, and Rhode Island from the beginning of his presidential campaign even before Kennedy's assassination. For the first time in history, a Democratic presidential candidate swept every Northeastern state in 1964. Not only did Johnson win every Northeastern state, but he won all of them with over 60% of the vote. New York weighed in as the fifth most Democratic state in the nation.

Johnson dominated heavily Democratic cities such as New York City, the largest in the country, as well as the upstate cities of Albany, Buffalo, Rochester, and Syracuse, which historically provided Democratic candidates an advantage. However, Johnson also swept every county in the state, including traditionally Republican parts of upstate New York and Long Island. Johnson carried all five boroughs of New York City, the first presidential candidate to do so since the landslide re-election of Franklin Roosevelt in 1936. In the borough of Manhattan, Johnson broke 80% of the vote, the first presidential candidate ever to do so. Brooklyn and the Bronx voted over 70% Democratic. Traditionally Republican Queens, narrowly carried by John F. Kennedy four years earlier in 1960, gave over 60% of the vote to Johnson. Even Staten Island voted Democratic, although it was the only county to give Goldwater more than 45% of the vote. Overall, New York City gave Johnson 73.02% of the vote, a citywide vote share no candidate would surpass until fellow Democrat Bill Clinton’s 77.10% in 1996. With 2,183,646 votes from the five boroughs, Johnson also received more votes in New York City than any other presidential candidate in history, setting a record that would hold until Democrat Hillary Clinton won 2,191,869 votes in 2016. Johnson's record of 4.9 million votes won by a single candidate in New York would hold for four years longer, being surpassed by Joe Biden in 2020.

Johnson's 68.56% of the vote remains the highest vote share any presidential candidate of either party has ever received in New York State. His 37.25% victory margin also remains the widest margin by which any Democratic presidential candidate has ever won New York State, and the second widest margin by which any candidate of either party has ever carried the state behind Republican Warren G. Harding’s 37.61% margin in the 1920 Republican landslide. This result also made Johnson one of only three presidential candidates of either party who have been able to sweep every county in New York State, along with Harding in 1920 and his successor Calvin Coolidge in 1924. New York weighed in for this election as 15% more Democratic than the national average.

== Results ==
A popular 1964 campaign ad for President Johnson.

1964 United States presidential election in New York
Party	Presidential nominee	Vice presidential nominee	Votes	Percentage	Electoral votes
Democratic	Lyndon B. Johnson	Hubert Humphrey	4,570,724	63.78%	
Liberal	Lyndon B. Johnson	Hubert Humphrey	342,432	4.78%	
Total	Lyndon B. Johnson (incumbent)	Hubert Humphrey	4,913,156	68.56%	43
Republican	Barry Goldwater	William E. Miller	2,243,559	31.31%	0
Socialist Labor	Eric Hass	Henning A. Blomen	6,085	0.08%	0
Socialist Workers	Clifton DeBerry	Ed Shaw	3,215	0.04%	0
Totals			7,166,015	100.0%	43

=== New York City results ===
1964 presidential election in New York City		Manhattan	The Bronx	Brooklyn	Queens	Staten Island	Total	
Democratic- Liberal	Lyndon B. Johnson	503,848	403,014	684,839	541,418	50,524	2,183,643	73.02%
Democratic- Liberal	Lyndon B. Johnson	80.52%	74.69%	74.80%	66.28%	54.36%	2,183,643	73.02%
Republican	Barry Goldwater	120,125	135,780	229,291	274,351	42,330	801,877	26.81%
Republican	Barry Goldwater	19.20%	25.16%	25.05%	33.59%	45.54%	801,877	26.81%
Socialist Labor	Eric Hass	966	552	879	748	71	3,216	0.11%
Socialist Labor	Eric Hass	0.15%	0.10%	0.10%	0.09%	0.08%	3,216	0.11%
Socialist Workers	Clifton DeBerry	780	248	494	311	21	1,854	0.06%
Socialist Workers	Clifton DeBerry	0.12%	0.05%	0.05%	0.04%	0.02%	1,854	0.06%
TOTAL		625,719	539,594	915,503	816,828	92,946	2,990,590	100.00%

=== Results by county ===
County	Lyndon B. Johnson Democratic/Liberal		Barry Goldwater Republican		Eric Hass Socialist Labor		Clifton DeBerry Socialist Workers		Margin		Total votes cast
County	#	%	#	%	#	%	#	%	#	%	Total votes cast
Albany	114,827	78.03%	32,224	21.90%	66	0.04%	35	0.02%	82,603	56.13%	147,152
Allegany	10,329	57.26%	7,688	42.62%	10	0.06%	12	0.07%	2,641	14.64%	18,039
Bronx	403,014	74.69%	135,780	25.16%	552	0.10%	248	0.05%	267,234	49.53%	539,594
Broome	59,021	64.76%	32,048	35.16%	54	0.06%	16	0.02%	26,973	29.60%	91,139
Cattaraugus	21,994	66.78%	10,907	33.12%	22	0.07%	10	0.03%	11,087	33.66%	32,933
Cayuga	24,090	67.73%	11,453	32.20%	13	0.04%	10	0.03%	12,637	35.53%	35,566
Chautauqua	42,924	69.17%	19,069	30.73%	44	0.07%	19	0.03%	23,855	38.44%	62,056
Chemung	26,332	64.10%	14,716	35.82%	24	0.06%	10	0.02%	11,616	28.28%	41,082
Chenango	11,653	61.49%	7,293	38.48%	4	0.02%	2	0.01%	4,360	23.01%	18,952
Clinton	18,398	75.12%	6,078	24.82%	9	0.04%	7	0.03%	12,320	50.30%	24,492
Columbia	14,516	61.62%	9,023	38.30%	13	0.06%	6	0.03%	5,493	23.32%	23,558
Cortland	11,110	64.33%	6,149	35.61%	4	0.02%	7	0.04%	4,961	28.72%	17,270
Delaware	11,686	58.24%	8,359	41.66%	15	0.07%	4	0.02%	3,327	16.58%	20,064
Dutchess	50,179	62.94%	29,503	37.01%	29	0.04%	14	0.02%	20,676	25.93%	79,725
Erie	344,910	73.14%	125,962	26.71%	513	0.11%	191	0.04%	218,948	46.43%	471,576
Essex	10,739	64.75%	5,837	35.19%	5	0.03%	4	0.02%	4,902	29.56%	16,585
Franklin	12,467	71.94%	4,846	27.96%	10	0.06%	6	0.03%	7,621	43.98%	17,329
Fulton	15,846	68.46%	7,278	31.44%	18	0.08%	5	0.02%	8,568	37.02%	23,147
Genesee	15,713	65.91%	8,114	34.03%	8	0.03%	6	0.03%	7,599	31.88%	23,841
Greene	10,034	56.07%	7,842	43.82%	9	0.05%	9	0.05%	2,192	12.25%	17,894
Hamilton	1,603	55.80%	1,269	44.17%	1	0.03%	0	0.00%	334	11.63%	2,873
Herkimer	20,136	66.42%	10,159	33.51%	11	0.04%	11	0.04%	9,977	32.91%	30,317
Jefferson	25,175	70.10%	10,718	29.84%	9	0.03%	12	0.03%	14,457	40.26%	35,914
Kings	684,839	74.80%	229,291	25.05%	879	0.10%	494	0.05%	455,548	49.75%	915,503
Lewis	6,584	67.33%	3,185	32.57%	5	0.05%	5	0.05%	3,399	34.76%	9,779
Livingston	13,481	65.38%	7,120	34.53%	8	0.04%	10	0.05%	6,361	30.85%	20,619
Madison	14,313	61.75%	8,858	38.21%	9	0.04%	0	0.00%	5,455	23.54%	23,180
Monroe	205,226	71.86%	80,099	28.05%	170	0.06%	87	0.03%	125,127	43.81%	285,582
Montgomery	19,370	69.52%	8,471	30.40%	12	0.04%	8	0.03%	10,899	39.12%	27,861
Nassau	382,590	60.53%	248,886	39.37%	428	0.07%	211	0.03%	133,704	21.16%	632,115
New York	503,848	80.52%	120,125	19.20%	966	0.15%	780	0.12%	383,723	61.32%	625,719
Niagara	67,260	70.07%	28,663	29.86%	44	0.05%	18	0.02%	38,597	40.21%	95,985
Oneida	73,359	64.80%	39,737	35.10%	82	0.07%	32	0.03%	33,622	29.70%	113,210
Onondaga	128,630	66.99%	63,205	32.92%	128	0.07%	51	0.03%	65,425	34.07%	192,014
Ontario	19,922	64.72%	10,847	35.24%	7	0.02%	8	0.03%	9,075	29.48%	30,784
Orange	48,244	61.13%	30,610	38.78%	49	0.06%	21	0.03%	17,634	22.35%	78,924
Orleans	9,304	62.46%	5,567	37.37%	18	0.12%	7	0.05%	3,737	25.09%	14,896
Oswego	24,788	66.59%	12,415	33.35%	13	0.03%	10	0.03%	12,373	33.24%	37,226
Otsego	15,190	63.67%	8,643	36.23%	19	0.08%	7	0.03%	6,547	27.44%	23,859
Putnam	12,636	57.75%	9,219	42.14%	11	0.05%	13	0.06%	3,417	15.61%	21,879
Queens	541,418	66.28%	274,351	33.59%	748	0.09%	311	0.04%	267,067	32.69%	816,828
Rensselaer	51,170	71.01%	20,814	28.88%	55	0.08%	21	0.03%	30,356	42.13%	72,060
Richmond	50,524	54.36%	42,330	45.54%	71	0.08%	21	0.02%	8,194	8.82%	92,946
Rockland	46,173	63.74%	26,187	36.15%	53	0.07%	29	0.04%	19,986	27.59%	72,442
St. Lawrence	29,173	70.62%	12,102	29.30%	23	0.05%	24	0.06%	17,071	41.32%	41,307
Saratoga	29,264	68.57%	13,364	31.32%	56	0.08%	24	0.03%	15,900	37.25%	42,675
Schenectady	51,892	70.30%	21,848	29.60%	8	0.07%	3	0.03%	30,044	40.70%	73,820
Schoharie	7,187	63.09%	4,193	36.81%	3	0.04%	2	0.03%	2,994	26.28%	11,391
Schuyler	4,326	59.62%	2,925	40.31%	7	0.05%	6	0.04%	1,401	19.31%	7,256
Seneca	8,890	66.46%	4,473	33.44%	20	0.05%	12	0.03%	4,417	33.02%	13,376
Steuben	24,634	60.61%	15,988	39.34%	15	0.04%	8	0.02%	8,646	21.27%	40,645
Suffolk	180,598	55.51%	144,350	44.37%	277	0.09%	108	0.03%	36,248	11.14%	325,333
Sullivan	16,728	67.52%	8,006	32.31%	23	0.09%	18	0.07%	8,722	35.21%	24,775
Tioga	10,411	59.26%	7,147	40.68%	4	0.02%	5	0.03%	3,264	18.58%	17,567
Tompkins	16,103	63.90%	9,070	35.99%	12	0.05%	17	0.07%	7,033	27.91%	25,202
Ulster	35,486	59.82%	23,749	40.03%	60	0.10%	31	0.05%	11,737	19.79%	59,326
Warren	12,772	61.94%	7,834	37.99%	10	0.05%	4	0.02%	4,938	23.95%	20,620
Washington	13,826	62.87%	8,160	37.10%	3	0.01%	4	0.02%	5,666	25.77%	21,993
Wayne	18,729	63.83%	10,586	36.08%	14	0.05%	13	0.04%	8,143	27.75%	29,342
Westchester	243,723	61.98%	149,052	37.90%	318	0.08%	142	0.04%	94,671	24.08%	393,235
Wyoming	8,866	59.19%	6,099	40.71%	10	0.07%	5	0.03%	2,767	18.48%	14,980
Yates	4,983	57.52%	3,675	42.42%	5	0.06%	0	0.00%	1,308	15.10%	8,663
Totals	4,913,156	68.56%	2,243,559	31.31%	6,085	0.08%	3,215	0.04%	2,669,597	37.25%	7,166,015

==== Counties that flipped from Republican to Democratic ====
- Allegany
- Broome
- Cattaraugus
- Cayuga
- Chautauqua
- Chemung
- Chenango
- Columbia
- Cortland
- Delaware
- Dutchess
- Essex
- Fulton
- Genesee
- Greene
- Hamilton
- Herkimer
- Jefferson
- Lewis
- Livingston
- Madison
- Monroe
- Nassau
- Onondaga
- Ontario
- Orange
- Orleans
- Oswego
- Otsego
- Putnam
- Rensselaer
- Richmond
- Rockland
- St. Lawrence
- Saratoga
- Schenectady
- Schoharie
- Schuyler
- Seneca
- Steuben
- Suffolk
- Sullivan
- Tioga
- Tompkins
- Ulster
- Warren
- Washington
- Wayne
- Westchester
- Wyoming
- Yates

== Analysis ==
As of the 2024 presidential election, this is the only time in American history that the counties of Genesee, Livingston, Orleans, and Wyoming voted for the Democratic presidential nominee. It is also the last time that Allegany, Greene, Hamilton, Putnam, Steuben, Tioga, and Wayne counties voted Democratic. Most of these counties were in the far western reaches of New York where the Whig Party was strongest in the Second Party System, before the rise of the Republican Party and during which Democrats regularly won more than a handful of upstate New York counties.

Many counties ended long streaks of not voting Democratic: It was the first time since 1948 that Monroe County voted for a Democrat, the first time since 1936 that Richmond, Rockland, Schenectady, and Sullivan counties voted for a Democrat, the first time since 1932 that Rensselaer County voted for a Democrat, the first time since 1916 that Chemung, Greene, Hamilton, Otsego, and Schoharie counties voted for a Democrat, the first time since 1912 that Cattaraugus, Columbia, Herkimer, Lewis, Nassau, Putnam, Seneca, Steuben, Suffolk, Tompkins, Ulster, and Westchester counties voted for a Democrat, the first time since 1876 that Orange County voted for a Democrat, the first since 1872 that Dutchess county voted for a Democrat, and the first time since 1852 that numerous upstate counties voted for a Democrat, namely: Allegany, Broome, Chenango, Delaware, Jefferson, Madison, Onondaga, Oswego, St. Lawrence, Tioga, Warren, and Wayne counties. Finally, Fulton and Cayuga counties had not voted Democratic since 1844, and Saratoga County not since 1836 – 128 years prior.

Unlike some analogous Northeastern counties where Johnson only won very narrowly, like Lancaster in Pennsylvania, Johnson won these normally Republican upstate counties by large margins of over 25%. This is one of two occasions between 1852 and 1992 that the Democratic candidate carried New York outside of the city (along with 1912), however, this was the only time they did so with a majority of the vote.

== See also ==
- United States presidential elections in New York
- Civil Rights Movement
- Great Society
- Jim Crow laws
- Presidency of Lyndon B. Johnson
- The Cold War
- Vietnam War
