= 1844 United States presidential election in New York =

- November 5, 1844
- Turnout: 92.1% ▲0.2 pp

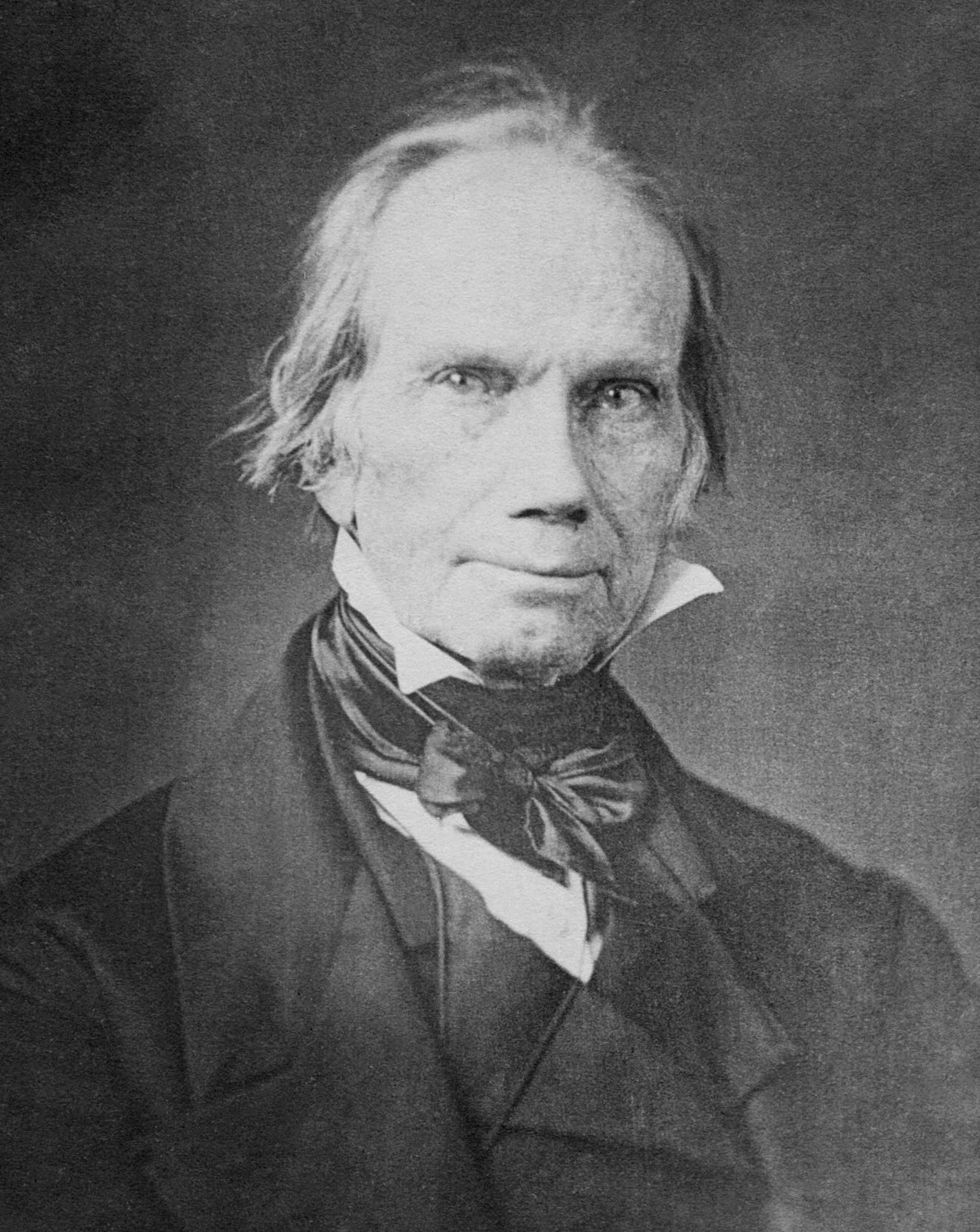
Nominee	James K. Polk	Henry Clay
Party	Democratic	Whig
Home state	Tennessee	Kentucky
Running mate	George M. Dallas	Theodore Frelinghuysen
Electoral vote	36	0
Popular vote	237,588	232,482
Percentage	48.90%	47.85%
County results
Polk
40–50%
50–60%
60–70%
Clay
40–50%
50–60%
60–70%
President before election
John Tyler
Independent
Elected President
James K. Polk
Democratic

A presidential election was held in New York on November 5, 1844, as part of the 1844 United States presidential election. Voters chose 36 representatives, or electors to the Electoral College, who voted for President and Vice President.

New York voted for the Democratic candidate, James K. Polk, over Whig candidate Henry Clay. Polk won New York by a narrow margin of 1.05%, making the state the second-closest in the country. New York was decisive; if Clay had won the state, he would have won the election with 141 electoral votes. Fulton and Cayuga would not vote Democratic again until 1964.

Critically, James Birney's vote total of 15,814 votes was more than the 5,106 vote difference between Polk and Clay.

== Results ==
1844 United States presidential election in New York (Note: Since New York voted for presidential electors directly, the totals below are based on the highest elector on each ticket.)
Party	Candidate	Running mate	Popular vote		Electoral vote	
Party	Candidate	Running mate	Count	%	Count	%
Democratic	James K. Polk of Tennessee	George Dallas of Pennsylvania	237,588	48.90%	36	100.00%
Whig	Henry Clay of Kentucky	Theodore Frelinghuysen of New York	232,482	47.85%	0	0.00%
Liberty	James G. Birney of Michigan	Thomas Morris of Ohio	15,814	3.25%	0	0.00%
Total			485,884	100.00%	36	100.00%

=== Results by county ===
County	James K. Polk Democratic		Henry Clay Whig		James G. Birney Liberty		Margin		Total votes cast
County	#	%	#	%	#	%	#	%	Total votes cast
Albany	6,916	48.88%	7,109	50.24%	124	0.88%	-193	-1.36%	14,149
Allegany	3,640	45.56%	3,913	48.98%	436	5.46%	-273	-3.42%	7,989
Broome	2,508	47.55%	2,661	50.45%	106	2.01%	-153	-2.90%	5,275
Cattaraugus	2,634	44.92%	2,743	46.78%	487	8.30%	-109	-1.86%	5,864
Cayuga	5,202	49.61%	4,908	46.81%	376	3.59%	294	2.80%	10,486
Chautauqua	3,407	36.50%	5,612	60.13%	314	3.36%	-2,205	-23.63%	9,333
Chemung	2,592	57.74%	1,791	39.90%	106	2.36%	801	17.84%	4,489
Chenango	4,495	50.21%	4,215	47.08%	243	2.71%	280	3.13%	8,953
Clinton	2,218	48.78%	1,919	42.20%	410	9.02%	299	6.58%	4,547
Columbia	4,691	51.98%	4,322	47.89%	11	0.12%	369	4.09%	9,024
Cortland	2,358	44.68%	2,378	45.05%	542	10.27%	-20	-0.38%	5,278
Delaware	4,230	56.35%	3,071	40.91%	205	2.73%	1,159	15.44%	7,506
Dutchess	5,627	49.23%	5,767	50.45%	37	0.32%	-140	1.22%	11,431
Erie	5,050	40.82%	6,905	55.82%	415	3.35%	-1,855	-15.00%	12,370
Essex	1,998	42.04%	2,612	54.95%	143	3.01%	-614	-12.92%	4,753
Franklin	1,501	48.14%	1,524	48.88%	93	2.98%	-23	-0.74%	3,118
Fulton (Note: Includes Hamilton County)	2,192	49.83%	2,107	47.90%	100	2.27%	85	1.93%	4,399
Genesee	2,105	35.04%	3,605	60.00%	298	4.96%	-1,499	-24.95%	6,007
Greene	3,488	53.78%	2,968	45.76%	30	0.46%	520	8.02%	6,486
Herkimer	4,346	55.56%	2,868	36.67%	608	7.77%	1,478	18.90%	7,822
Jefferson	6,291	50.01%	5,576	44.33%	712	5.66%	715	5.68%	12,579
Kings	4,648	47.27%	5,107	51.94%	77	0.78%	-459	-4.67%	9,832
Lewis	2,073	53.61%	1,640	42.41%	154	3.98%	433	11.20%	3,867
Livingston	2,709	40.48%	3,773	56.38%	210	3.14%	-1,064	-15.90%	6,692
Madison	3,848	43.52%	3,683	41.65%	1,311	14.83%	165	1.87%	8,842
Monroe	5,611	43.45%	6,873	53.22%	430	3.33%	-1,262	-9.77%	12,914
Montgomery	3,278	52.77%	2,849	45.86%	85	1.37%	429	6.91%	6,212
New York	28,296	51.64%	26,385	48.15%	117	0.21%	1,911	3.49%	54,798
Niagara	2,589	43.16%	3,100	51.68%	309	5.15%	-511	-8.52%	5,998
Oneida	7,717	48.71%	6,983	44.07%	1,144	7.22%	734	4.63%	15,844
Onondaga	6,878	48.76%	6,495	46.04%	733	5.20%	383	2.72%	14,106
Ontario	3,659	42.24%	4,568	52.74%	435	5.02%	-909	-10.49%	8,662
Orange	5,303	53.21%	4,626	46.42%	37	0.37%	677	6.79%	9,966
Orleans	2,311	44.55%	2,600	50.13%	276	5.32%	-289	-5.57%	5,187
Oswego	4,382	48.67%	3,771	41.88%	851	9.45%	611	6.79%	9,004
Otsego	6,050	53.99%	4,743	42.33%	413	3.69%	1,307	11.66%	11,206
Putnam	1,731	63.87%	979	36.13%	0	0.00%	752	27.75%	2,710
Queens	2,751	51.93%	2,547	48.07%	0	0.00%	204	3.85%	5,298
Rensselaer	5,618	46.20%	6,361	52.31%	181	1.49%	-743	-6.11%	12,160
Richmond	1,063	50.31%	1,049	49.65%	1	0.05%	14	0.66%	2,113
Rockland	1,679	67.87%	794	32.09%	1	0.04%	885	35.77%	2,474
Saratoga	4,200	47.36%	4,550	51.30%	119	1.34%	-350	-3.95%	8,869
Schenectady	1,679	47.64%	1,814	51.48%	31	0.88%	-135	-3.83%	3,524
Schoharie	3,523	53.22%	2,986	45.11%	111	1.68%	537	8.11%	6,620
Seneca	2,569	51.18%	2,327	46.35%	124	2.47%	242	4.82%	5,020
St. Lawrence	6,008	53.89%	4,672	41.91%	468	4.20%	1,336	11.98%	11,148
Steuben	5,512	54.36%	4,385	43.24%	243	2.40%	1,127	11.11%	10,140
Suffolk	3,375	57.44%	2,487	42.32%	14	0.24%	888	15.11%	5,876
Sullivan	1,964	52.61%	1,739	46.58%	30	0.80%	225	6.03%	3,733
Tioga	2,548	54.95%	1,999	43.11%	90	1.94%	549	11.84%	4,637
Tompkins	4,013	49.05%	38,45	46.99%	324	3.96%	168	2.05%	8,182
Ulster	4,783	49.83%	4,804	50.05%	12	0.13%	-21	-0.22%	9,599
Warren	1,791	55.29%	1,330	41.06%	118	3.64%	461	14.23%	3,239
Washington	3,270	37.88%	5,024	58.20%	338	3.92%	-1,754	-20.32%	8,632
Wayne	4,046	47.26%	3,953	46.17%	563	6.58%	93	1.09%	8,562
Westchester	4,412	50.78%	4,258	49.00%	19	0.22%	154	1.77%	8,689
Wyoming	2,102	39.68%	2,754	51.98%	442	8.34%	-652	-12.31%	5,298
Yates	2,110	48.25%	2,056	47.02%	207	4.73%	54	1.23%	4,373
Total	237,588	48.90%	232,482	47.85%	15,814	3.25%	5,106	1.05%	485,884

==== Counties that flipped from Whig to Democratic ====
- Cayuga
- Chenango
- Clinton
- Fulton
- Jefferson
- Madison
- Oswego
- Richmond
- St. Lawrence
- Tompkins
- Wayne

==== Counties that flipped from Democratic to Whig ====
- Dutchess

== See also ==
- United States presidential elections in New York
