= 1948 United States presidential election in New York =

- November 2, 1948
- Turnout: 65.0% ▼5.9 pp
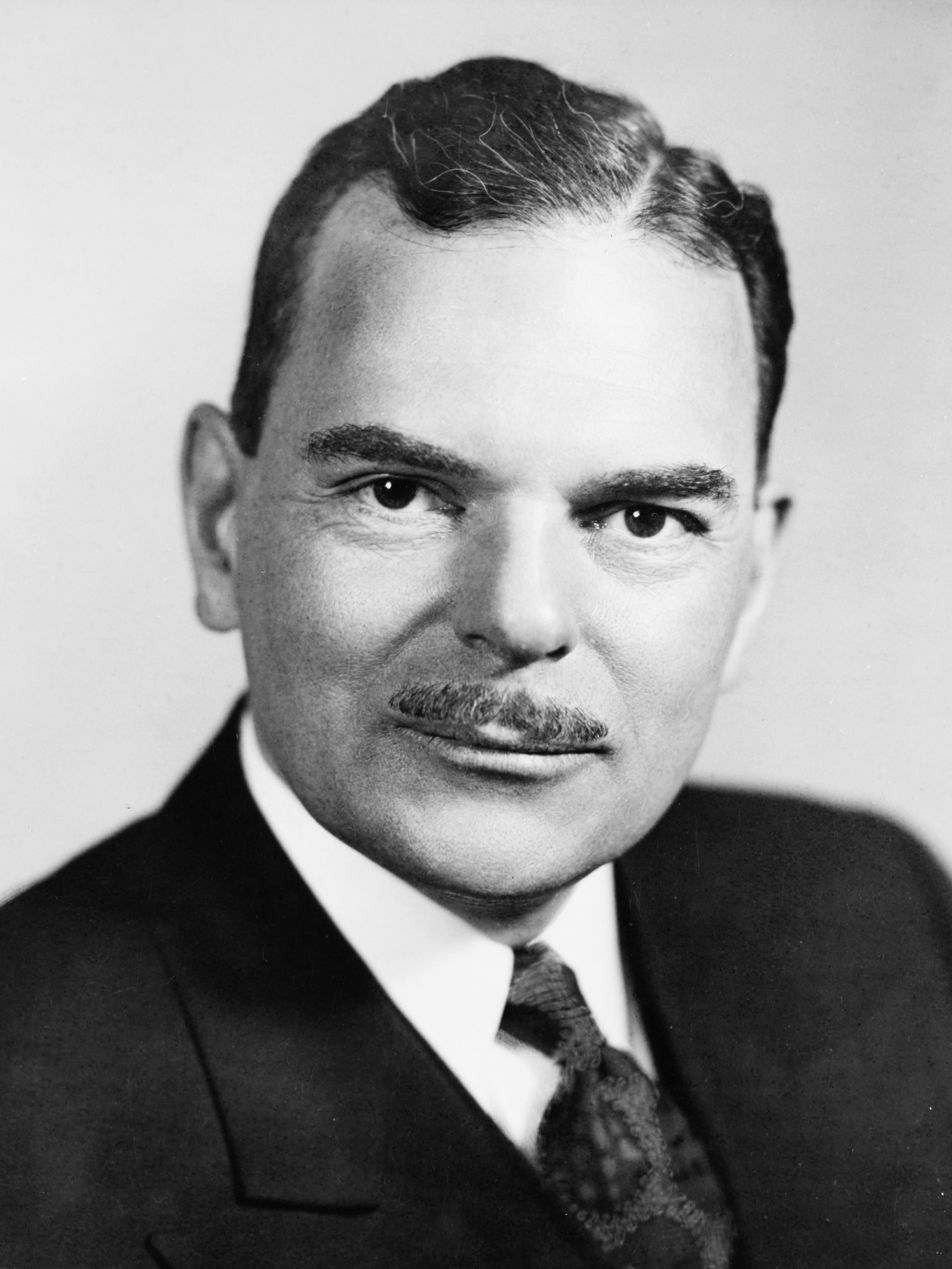

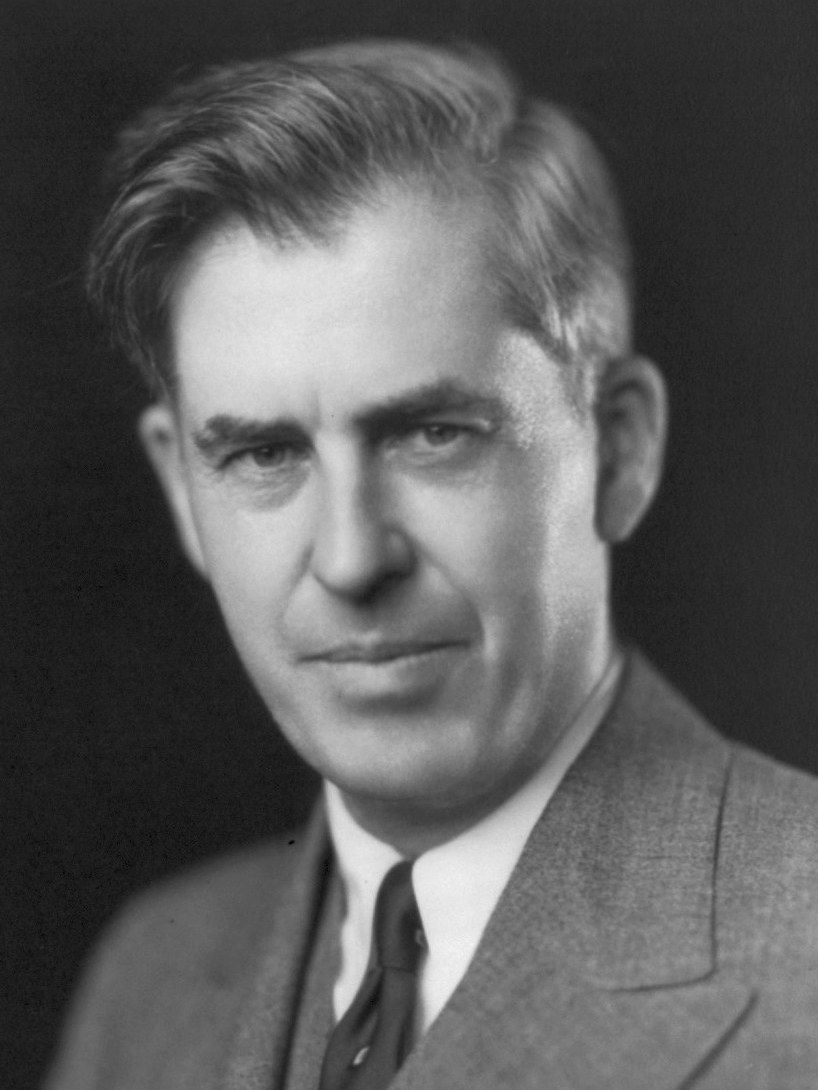
Nominee	Thomas E. Dewey	Harry S. Truman	Henry A. Wallace
Party	Republican	Democratic	American Labor
Alliance		Liberal
Home state	New York	Missouri	New York
Running mate	Earl Warren	Alben W. Barkley	Glen H. Taylor
Electoral vote	47	0	0
Popular vote	2,841,163	2,780,204	509,559
Percentage	45.99%	45.01%	8.25%
County results
Dewey
40–50%
50–60%
60–70%
70–80%
Truman
40–50%
50–60%
President before election
Harry S. Truman
Democratic
Elected President
Harry S. Truman
Democratic

The 1948 United States presidential election in New York took place on November 2, 1948. All contemporary 48 states were part of the 1948 United States presidential election. Voters chose 47 electors to the Electoral College, which selected the president and vice president.

New York was won by local Republican Governor Thomas E. Dewey, who was running against incumbent Democratic President Harry S. Truman. Dewey ran with California Governor Earl Warren for vice president, and Truman ran with Kentucky Senator Alben W. Barkley. Dewey took 45.99% of the vote to Truman's 45.01%, a margin of 0.98%. Progressive Party candidate Henry A. Wallace, a former Democratic Vice President who ran to the left of Truman and was nominated by the local American Labor Party, finished a strong third, with 8.25%.

New York weighed in for this election as 1% more third-party than the national average, and less Democratic and Republican than the national average, despite New York being Governor Dewey's home state. The presidential election of 1948 was a very multi-partisan election for New York, with more than nine percent of the people who voted doing so for third parties. In typical form for the time, the highly populated urban centers of New York City, Buffalo, and Albany, voted primarily Democratic, while most of the smaller counties in New York turned out for Dewey as the Republican candidate.

Henry Wallace's relatively strong third party support as a Progressive candidate was concentrated in the New York City area; in the three Democratic boroughs of New York City (Manhattan, Brooklyn, and the Bronx), Wallace took percentages in the double digits. Wallace's vote splitting among left-leaning voters in New York City contributed to Dewey narrowly defeating Truman in the state, after New York had voted Democratic for Franklin D. Roosevelt—himself a former governor and favorite son—in the preceding four elections. Although Truman lost the state, he did pick up Oneida County, which Roosevelt had lost in all his four elections and which had last been won for the Democrats by Woodrow Wilson in the three-way 1912 election, and before that by Grover Cleveland in 1884.

Dewey won the election in New York by a narrow margin of less than one percentage point, despite it being his home state, and more importantly despite not facing a local opponent like he had four years earlier when he was defeated by the then-incumbent President (and former New York Governor) Franklin D. Roosevelt.

For the first presidential election since 1916, New York did not back the winning candidate. This was also the first election wherein the losing major-party candidate carried their home state since Charles Evans Hughes carried New York in 1916, and the only instance between that election and 1960. Alongside Strom Thurmond’s win in South Carolina, this was the first time since Robert M. La Follette carried Wisconsin in 1924 that any losing candidate had done so.

Truman is the last Democrat to win a presidential election without winning New York, and Dewey's victory made him the third and final Republican presidential candidate to win New York without winning the election, the first being John C. Frémont in 1856 and the second Hughes in 1916. Dewey's victory was the first of three consecutive Republican victories in the state, as New York would not vote Democratic again until John F. Kennedy won the state in 1960.

== Results ==
1948 United States presidential election in New York
Party	Candidate	Votes	Percentage	Electoral votes
Republican	Thomas E. Dewey	2,841,163	45.99%	47
Democratic	Harry S. Truman	2,557,642	41.40%	0
Liberal	Harry S. Truman	222,562	3.60%	0
Total	Harry S. Truman (incumbent)	2,780,204	45.01%	0
American Labor (Progressive) (Note: Although he ran under the “Progressive” label in other states, in New York Wallace was endorsed by the American Labor Party and ran under that party’s banner.)	Henry A. Wallace	509,559	8.25%	0
Socialist	Norman Thomas	40,879	0.66%	0
Socialist Labor	Edward Teichert	2,729	0.04%	0
Socialist Workers	Farrell Dobbs	2,675	0.04%	0
Write-ins		128	<0.01%	0
Totals		6,177,337	100.0%	47

=== New York City results ===
1948 Presidential Election in New York City		Manhattan	The Bronx	Brooklyn	Queens	Staten Island	Total	
Democratic- Liberal	Harry S. Truman	380,310	337,129	579,922	268,742	30,442	1,596,545	50.57%
Democratic- Liberal	Harry S. Truman	51.52%	54.17%	53.51%	42.02%	41.62%	1,596,545	50.57%
Republican	Thomas E. Dewey	241,752	173,044	330,494	323,459	39,539	1,108,288	35.10%
Republican	Thomas E. Dewey	32.75%	27.80%	30.49%	50.58%	54.06%	1,108,288	35.10%
American Labor	Henry A. Wallace	106,509	106,762	163,896	42,409	2,779	422,355	13.38%
American Labor	Henry A. Wallace	14.43%	17.15%	15.12%	6.63%	3.80%	422,355	13.38%
Socialist	Norman Thomas	8,685	4,649	7,734	4,580	349	25,997	0.82%
Socialist	Norman Thomas	1.18%	0.75%	0.71%	0.72%	0.48%	25,997	0.82%
Socialist Workers	Farrell Dobbs	493	387	1,122	108	9	2,119	0.06%
Socialist Workers	Farrell Dobbs	0.07%	0.06%	0.10%	0.02%	0.01%	2,119	0.06%
Socialist Labor	Edward A. Teichert	488	384	535	245	16	1,668	0.05%
Socialist Labor	Edward A. Teichert	0.07%	0.06%	0.05%	0.04%	0.02%	1,668	0.05%
TOTAL		738,237	622,355	1,083,801	639,543	73,134	3,157,070	100.00%

=== Results by county ===
County	Thomas E. Dewey Republican		Harry S. Truman Democratic/Liberal		Henry A. Wallace American Labor		Various candidates Other parties		Margin		Total votes cast
County	#	%	#	%	#	%	#	%	#	%	Total votes cast
Albany	59,965	42.61%	75,419	53.59%	4,903	3.48%	443	0.31%	-15,454	-10.98%	140,730
Allegany	12,689	71.94%	4,711	26.71%	168	0.95%	71	0.40%	7,978	45.23%	17,639
Bronx	173,044	27.80%	337,129	54.17%	106,762	17.15%	5,420	0.87%	-164,085	-26.37%	622,355
Broome	43,110	60.73%	25,654	36.14%	1,992	2.81%	230	0.32%	17,456	24.59%	70,986
Cattaraugus	18,246	60.03%	11,289	37.14%	752	2.47%	106	0.35%	6,957	22.89%	30,393
Cayuga	19,017	56.35%	14,317	42.42%	293	0.87%	120	0.36%	4,700	13.93%	33,747
Chautauqua	29,969	57.47%	20,683	39.67%	1,251	2.40%	241	0.46%	9,286	17.81%	52,144
Chemung	22,754	61.63%	13,352	36.17%	673	1.82%	140	0.38%	9,402	25.47%	36,919
Chenango	11,988	70.59%	4,764	28.05%	175	1.03%	55	0.32%	7,224	42.54%	16,982
Clinton	9,694	49.07%	9,357	47.37%	646	3.27%	58	0.29%	337	1.71%	19,755
Columbia	13,758	65.89%	6,527	31.26%	522	2.50%	73	0.35%	7,231	34.63%	20,880
Cortland	10,433	68.27%	4,614	30.19%	189	1.24%	47	0.31%	5,819	38.07%	15,283
Delaware	14,226	73.05%	4,965	25.50%	220	1.13%	63	0.32%	9,261	47.56%	19,474
Dutchess	34,067	64.23%	17,439	32.88%	1,240	2.34%	293	0.55%	16,628	31.35%	53,039
Erie	175,118	45.68%	197,618	51.55%	8,885	2.32%	1,751	0.46%	-22,500	-5.87%	383,372
Essex	10,287	69.90%	4,088	27.78%	297	2.02%	45	0.31%	6,199	42.12%	14,717
Franklin	8,993	55.17%	6,799	41.71%	454	2.78%	56	0.34%	2,194	13.46%	16,302
Fulton	12,787	60.50%	7,667	36.28%	600	2.84%	80	0.38%	5,120	24.23%	21,134
Genesee	12,650	62.80%	7,024	34.87%	415	2.06%	53	0.26%	5,626	27.93%	20,142
Greene	10,566	66.52%	4,955	31.20%	321	2.02%	41	0.26%	5,611	35.33%	15,883
Hamilton	2,000	71.68%	744	26.67%	41	1.47%	5	0.18%	1,256	45.02%	2,790
Herkimer	14,688	51.83%	12,577	44.38%	1,002	3.54%	71	0.25%	2,111	7.45%	28,338
Jefferson	19,661	58.95%	13,176	39.51%	412	1.24%	102	0.31%	6,485	19.44%	33,351
Kings	330,494	30.49%	579,922	53.51%	163,896	15.12%	9,489	0.88%	-249,428	-23.01%	1,083,801
Lewis	5,692	62.70%	3,211	35.37%	147	1.62%	28	0.31%	2,481	27.33%	9,078
Livingston	11,310	62.62%	6,409	35.48%	282	1.56%	61	0.34%	4,901	27.13%	18,062
Madison	13,413	68.23%	5,937	30.20%	198	1.01%	110	0.56%	7,476	38.03%	19,658
Monroe	109,608	48.12%	110,641	48.57%	6,461	2.84%	1,080	0.47%	-1,033	-0.45%	227,790
Montgomery	14,212	48.90%	14,085	48.46%	696	2.39%	71	0.24%	127	0.44%	29,064
Nassau	184,284	69.48%	70,492	26.58%	8,121	3.06%	2,341	0.88%	113,792	42.90%	265,238
New York	241,752	32.75%	380,310	51.52%	106,509	14.43%	9,666	1.31%	-138,558	-18.77%	738,237
Niagara	35,858	49.65%	34,119	47.24%	2,046	2.83%	196	0.27%	1,739	2.41%	72,219
Oneida	46,755	47.90%	48,332	49.51%	2,269	2.32%	257	0.26%	-1,577	-1.62%	97,613
Onondaga	84,370	53.86%	66,295	42.32%	4,971	3.17%	1,012	0.65%	18,075	11.54%	156,648
Ontario	16,156	63.51%	8,852	34.80%	333	1.31%	98	0.39%	7,304	28.71%	25,439
Orange	38,351	63.08%	20,638	33.95%	1,559	2.56%	248	0.41%	17,713	29.14%	60,796
Orleans	9,566	69.15%	4,009	28.98%	233	1.68%	26	0.19%	5,557	40.17%	13,834
Oswego	19,095	58.03%	12,820	38.96%	884	2.69%	105	0.32%	6,275	19.07%	32,904
Otsego	15,437	66.55%	7,174	30.93%	495	2.13%	91	0.39%	8,263	35.62%	23,197
Putnam	8,222	63.85%	4,012	31.16%	504	3.91%	139	1.08%	4,210	32.69%	12,877
Queens	323,459	50.58%	268,742	42.02%	42,409	6.63%	4,933	0.77%	54,717	8.56%	639,543
Rensselaer	40,375	56.71%	28,468	39.98%	2,080	2.92%	274	0.38%	11,907	16.72%	71,197
Richmond	39,539	54.06%	30,442	41.62%	2,779	3.80%	374	0.51%	9,097	12.44%	73,134
Rockland	20,661	57.90%	13,066	36.62%	1,583	4.44%	371	1.04%	7,595	21.29%	35,681
St. Lawrence	21,160	60.59%	13,200	37.80%	471	1.35%	94	0.27%	7,960	22.79%	34,925
Saratoga	20,706	61.50%	11,457	34.03%	1,354	4.02%	149	0.44%	9,249	27.47%	33,666
Schenectady	35,495	52.67%	28,225	41.88%	3,093	4.59%	578	0.86%	7,270	10.79%	67,391
Schoharie	6,751	61.27%	4,032	36.59%	208	1.89%	28	0.25%	2,719	24.68%	11,019
Schuyler	4,452	69.23%	1,868	29.05%	97	1.51%	14	0.22%	2,584	40.18%	6,431
Seneca	7,266	58.05%	4,897	39.13%	318	2.54%	35	0.28%	2,369	18.93%	12,516
Steuben	22,938	62.44%	12,895	35.10%	789	2.15%	114	0.31%	10,043	27.34%	36,736
Suffolk	75,519	69.75%	29,104	26.88%	2,842	2.63%	800	0.74%	46,415	42.87%	108,265
Sullivan	11,253	53.20%	7,654	36.19%	2,107	9.96%	138	0.65%	3,599	17.01%	21,152
Tioga	8,673	70.16%	3,385	27.38%	258	2.09%	46	0.37%	5,288	42.78%	12,362
Tompkins	13,719	67.11%	5,721	27.98%	656	3.21%	348	1.70%	7,998	39.12%	20,444
Ulster	28,941	64.30%	14,441	32.08%	1,407	3.13%	223	0.50%	14,500	32.21%	45,012
Warren	12,884	68.89%	5,486	29.33%	274	1.47%	59	0.32%	7,398	39.56%	18,703
Washington	13,975	68.29%	6,017	29.40%	396	1.94%	76	0.37%	7,958	38.89%	20,464
Wayne	16,167	69.48%	6,749	29.00%	291	1.25%	63	0.27%	9,418	40.47%	23,270
Westchester	177,077	61.11%	95,681	33.02%	14,084	4.86%	2,923	1.01%	81,396	28.09%	289,765
Wyoming	9,871	67.78%	4,508	30.95%	155	1.06%	30	0.21%	5,363	36.82%	14,564
Yates	5,997	73.50%	2,040	25.00%	91	1.12%	31	0.38%	3,957	48.50%	8,159
Totals	2,841,163	45.99%	2,780,204	45.01%	509,559	8.25%	46,283	0.75%	60,959	0.99%	6,177,209

==== Counties that flipped from Democratic to Republican ====
- Clinton

==== Counties that flipped from Republican to Democratic ====
- Oneida

== See also ==
- Civil rights movement
- Cold War
- Korean War
- Presidency of Harry S. Truman
- United States presidential elections in New York
