= 1912 United States presidential election in New York =

- November 5, 1912
- Turnout: 72.1% ▼7.6 pp

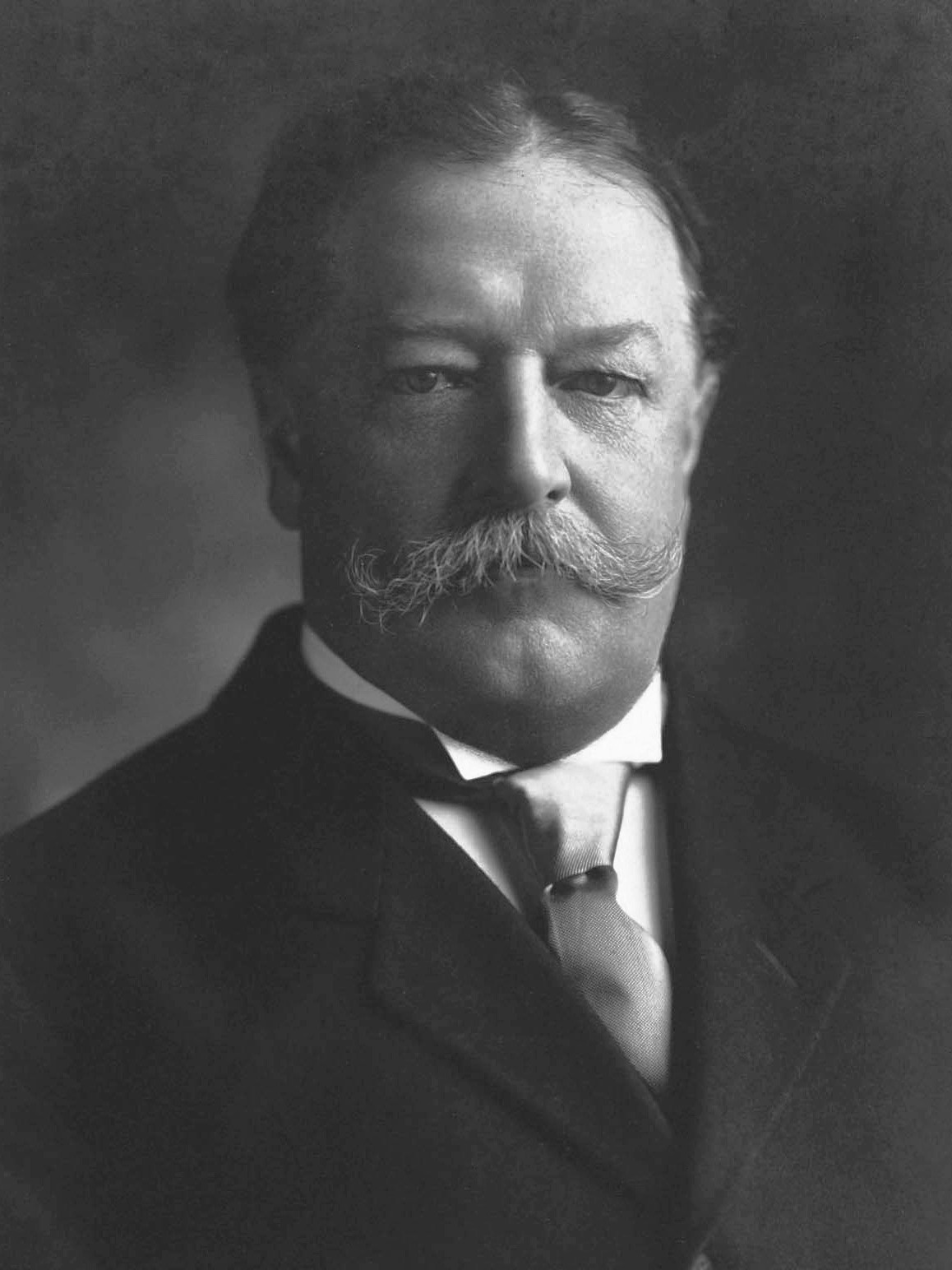

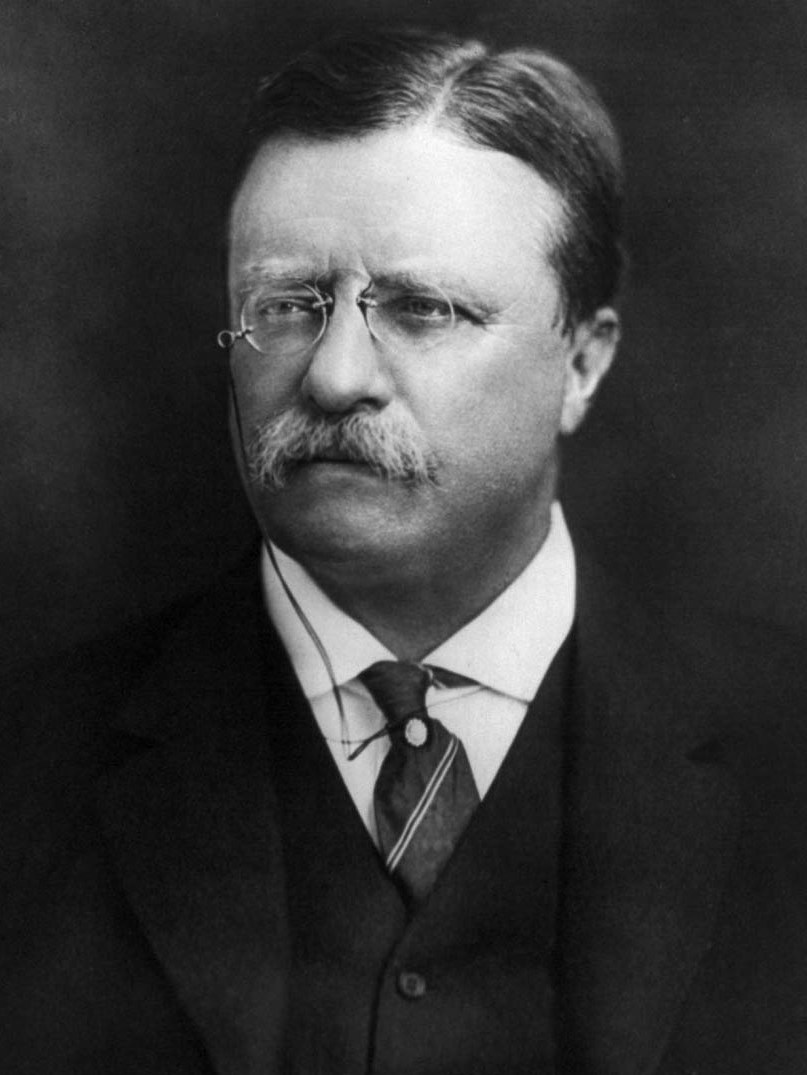
Nominee	Woodrow Wilson	William Howard Taft	Theodore Roosevelt
Party	Democratic	Republican	Progressive
Home state	New Jersey	Ohio	New York
Running mate	Thomas R. Marshall	Nicholas Murray Butler	Hiram Johnson
Electoral vote	45	0	0
Popular vote	655,573	455,487	390,093
Percentage	41.27%	28.68%	24.56%
County results
Wilson
30–40%
40–50%
50–60%
Taft
30–40%
40–50%
President before election
William Howard Taft
Republican
Elected President
Woodrow Wilson
Democratic

The 1912 United States presidential election in New York took place on November 5, 1912. All 48 contiguous states were part of the 1912 United States presidential election. Voters chose 45 electors to the Electoral College, which selected the president and vice president.

New York was won by the Democratic nominees, New Jersey Governor Woodrow Wilson and his running mate, Indiana Governor Thomas R. Marshall. Opposing him were the Republican nominees, incumbent President William Howard Taft and Vice President James S. Sherman, and the Progressive Party candidates, former President Theodore Roosevelt and his running mate California Governor Hiram Johnson. Also in the running was the Socialist Party candidate, Eugene V. Debs, who ran with Emil Seidel.

Wilson won New York with a plurality of 41.27% of the vote, Taft came in second, with 28.68%, and Roosevelt came in third, with 24.56%. Wilson's margin over Taft was thus 12.59%, whilst Debs came in fourth, with 3.99%. In terms of margin, Wilson finished 18.6 percentage points ahead of Taft nationally, but only 12.6 percentage points ahead of Taft in New York State, so New York State weighed in at about 6% more Republican than the nation in the 1912 presidential election. Wilson's vote margin of victory over Taft in the state was by 200,086 votes.

New York during the Fourth Party System was usually a Republican state in presidential elections. However, the strong third party run by former Republican President Theodore Roosevelt as the Bull Moose Party candidate against the incumbent Republican President William Howard Taft split the Republican vote, enabling Woodrow Wilson as the Democratic candidate to win New York's electoral votes in 1912 with a plurality of only 41% of the vote. This was the only presidential election during the Fourth Party System that New York voted for a Democratic presidential candidate.

Prior to 1912, New York had not given its electoral votes to a Democratic presidential candidate since Grover Cleveland in 1892. Wilson would lose New York State four years later in the midst of his re-election against native son Charles Evans Hughes in 1916, and the state would not vote Democratic again until 1932.

== Results ==
1912 United States presidential election in New York
Party	Candidate	Votes	Percentage	Electoral votes
Democratic	Woodrow Wilson	655,573	41.27%	45
Republican	William Howard Taft (incumbent)	455,487	28.68%	0
Progressive	Theodore Roosevelt	390,093	24.56%	0
Socialist	Eugene V. Debs	63,434	3.99%	0
Prohibition	Eugene W. Chafin	19,455	1.22%	0
Socialist Labor	Arthur E. Reimer	4,273	0.27%	0
Totals		1,588,315	100.0%	45

=== New York City results ===
1912 Presidential Election in New York City		Manhattan	The Bronx	Brooklyn	Queens	Staten Island	Total	
Democratic	Woodrow Wilson	166,157		109,748	28,076	8,445	312,426	47.06%
Democratic	Woodrow Wilson	47.79%		44.86%	50.32%	53.60%	312,426	47.06%
Progressive	Theodore Roosevelt	98,985		71,173	14,967	3,771	188,896	28.45%
Progressive	Theodore Roosevelt	28.47%		29.09%	26.82%	23.93%	188,896	28.45%
Republican	William Howard Taft	63,107		51,239	9,201	3,035	126,582	19.07%
Republican	William Howard Taft	18.15%		20.94%	16.49%	19.26%	126,582	19.07%
Socialist	Eugene V. Debs	18,124		11,459	3,329	327	33,239	5.01%
Socialist	Eugene V. Debs	5.21%		4.68%	5.97%	2.08%	33,239	5.01%
Socialist Labor	Arthur E. Reimer	930		568	117	34	1,649	0.25%
Socialist Labor	Arthur E. Reimer	0.27%		0.23%	0.21%	0.22%	1,649	0.25%
Prohibition	Eugene W. Chafin	352		476	108	145	1,081	0.16%
Prohibition	Eugene W. Chafin	0.10%		0.19%	0.19%	0.92%	1,081	0.16%
TOTAL		347,655		244,663	55,798	15,757	663,873	100.00%

=== Results by county ===
County	Woodrow Wilson Democratic		William Howard Taft Republican		Theodore Roosevelt Progressive "Bull Moose"		Eugene V. Debs Socialist		Eugene W. Chafin Prohibition		Arthur E. Reimer Socialist Labor		Margin		Total votes cast
County	#	%	#	%	#	%	#	%	#	%	#	%	#	%	Total votes cast
Albany	17,235	40.07%	20,418	47.47%	4,487	10.43%	625	1.45%	198	0.46%	52	0.12%	-3,183	-7.40%	43,015
Allegany	2,777	28.15%	3,668	37.19%	2,664	27.01%	283	2.87%	449	4.55%	23	0.23%	-891	-9.04%	9,864
Broome	6,533	35.79%	7,949	43.55%	2,586	14.17%	355	1.94%	798	4.37%	31	0.17%	-1,416	-7.76%	18,252
Cattaraugus	4,886	34.02%	4,820	33.56%	3,487	24.28%	608	4.23%	537	3.74%	25	0.17%	66	0.46%	14,363
Cayuga	4,691	34.05%	5,788	42.01%	2,428	17.62%	526	3.82%	291	2.11%	53	0.38%	-1,097	-7.96%	13,777
Chautauqua	4,954	22.68%	7,899	36.16%	6,577	30.11%	1,354	6.20%	947	4.34%	113	0.52%	1,322 (Note: In this county where Roosevelt ran second ahead of Wilson, the margin and percentage margin given are those between Taft and Roosevelt (Taft positive).)	6.05%	21,844
Chemung	6,008	46.27%	3,317	25.54%	2,733	21.05%	410	3.16%	494	3.80%	23	0.18%	2,691	20.73%	12,985
Chenango	3,341	35.29%	4,043	42.71%	1,609	17.00%	98	1.04%	366	3.87%	9	0.10%	-702	-7.42%	9,466
Clinton	3,323	38.09%	3,903	44.74%	1,207	13.84%	52	0.60%	215	2.46%	23	0.26%	-580	-6.65%	8,723
Columbia	4,599	46.73%	3,741	38.01%	1,318	13.39%	78	0.79%	90	0.91%	15	0.15%	858	8.72%	9,841
Cortland	2,283	30.86%	2,959	39.99%	1,629	22.02%	70	0.95%	446	6.03%	12	0.16%	-676	-9.13%	7,399
Delaware	4,511	38.45%	4,731	40.32%	1,895	16.15%	329	2.80%	255	2.17%	12	0.10%	-220	-1.87%	11,733
Dutchess	8,871	43.43%	8,916	43.65%	2,126	10.41%	204	1.00%	282	1.38%	26	0.13%	-45	-0.22%	20,425
Erie	33,518	39.38%	19,185	22.54%	26,353	30.96%	4,779	5.61%	680	0.80%	598	0.70%	7,165 (Note: In this county where Roosevelt ran second ahead of Taft, the margins given are those between Wilson and Roosevelt and percentage margin Wilson percentage minus Roosevelt percentage.)	8.42%	85,113
Essex	2,070	29.26%	3,127	44.20%	1,720	24.31%	68	0.96%	78	1.10%	12	0.17%	-1,057	-14.94%	7,075
Franklin	2,711	32.30%	3,930	46.82%	1,363	16.24%	74	0.88%	298	3.55%	17	0.20%	-1,219	-14.52%	8,393
Fulton	2,550	25.90%	3,741	38.00%	2,173	22.07%	1,043	10.59%	270	2.74%	69	0.70%	-1,191	-12.10%	9,846
Genesee	2,656	32.14%	3,231	39.10%	2,061	24.94%	81	0.98%	225	2.72%	10	0.12%	-575	-6.96%	8,264
Greene	3,647	48.82%	2,711	36.29%	818	10.95%	93	1.24%	195	2.61%	7	0.09%	936	12.53%	7,471
Hamilton	493	43.44%	454	40.00%	163	14.36%	7	0.62%	18	1.59%	0	0.00%	39	3.44%	1,135
Herkimer	5,122	37.72%	4,665	34.35%	3,129	23.04%	459	3.38%	163	1.20%	42	0.31%	457	3.37%	13,580
Jefferson	6,054	34.35%	6,692	37.97%	3,603	20.44%	602	3.42%	635	3.60%	38	0.22%	-638	-3.62%	17,624
Kings	109,748	44.86%	51,239	20.94%	71,173	29.09%	11,459	4.68%	476	0.19%	568	0.23%	38,575	15.77%	244,663
Lewis	2,339	38.39%	2,064	33.87%	1,512	24.82%	31	0.51%	139	2.28%	8	0.13%	275	4.52%	6,093
Livingston	3,203	35.70%	3,726	41.52%	1,786	19.89%	51	0.57%	200	2.23%	7	0.08%	-523	-5.82%	8,973
Madison	3,164	31.86%	3,490	35.15%	2,709	27.28%	290	2.92%	245	2.47%	32	0.32%	-326	-3.29%	9,930
Monroe	17,863	33.34%	16,880	31.51%	14,919	27.85%	2,943	5.49%	705	1.32%	267	0.50%	983	1.83%	53,577
Montgomery	4,508	37.57%	5,040	42.00%	1,894	15.78%	408	3.40%	121	1.01%	28	0.23%	-532	-4.43%	11,999
Nassau	7,073	38.14%	4,608	24.85%	6,563	35.39%	150	0.81%	142	0.77%	10	0.05%	510	2.75%	18,546
New York	166,157	47.79%	63,107	18.15%	98,985	28.47%	18,124	5.21%	352	0.10%	930	0.27%	67,172	19.32%	347,655
Niagara	7,647	40.66%	5,654	30.06%	4,256	22.63%	766	4.07%	427	2.27%	58	0.31%	1,993	10.60%	18,808
Oneida	12,182	36.17%	11,245	33.39%	8,332	24.74%	1,267	3.76%	454	1.35%	196	0.58%	937	2.78%	33,676
Onondaga	15,827	34.47%	16,202	35.29%	10,694	23.29%	2,430	5.29%	602	1.31%	162	0.35%	-375	-0.82%	45,917
Ontario	4,734	38.55%	4,897	39.88%	2,278	18.55%	166	1.35%	191	1.56%	13	0.11%	-163	-1.33%	12,279
Orange	9,404	39.14%	10,364	43.14%	3,509	14.61%	398	1.66%	281	1.17%	70	0.29%	-960	-4.00%	24,026
Orleans	2,448	33.94%	2,983	41.36%	1,432	19.86%	73	1.01%	268	3.72%	8	0.11%	-535	-7.42%	7,212
Oswego	5,256	32.84%	5,996	37.47%	3,950	24.68%	149	0.93%	627	3.92%	25	0.16%	-740	-4.63%	16,003
Otsego	5,338	42.23%	5,138	40.65%	1,696	13.42%	125	0.99%	335	2.65%	9	0.07%	200	1.58%	12,641
Putnam	1,321	41.13%	1,267	39.45%	593	18.46%	9	0.28%	20	0.62%	2	0.06%	54	1.68%	3,212
Queens	28,076	50.32%	9,201	16.49%	14,967	26.82%	3,329	5.97%	108	0.19%	117	0.21%	13,109	23.50%	55,798
Rensselaer	11,684	42.50%	10,853	39.48%	3,735	13.59%	859	3.12%	262	0.95%	98	0.36%	831	3.02%	27,491
Richmond	8,445	53.60%	3,035	19.26%	3,771	23.93%	327	2.08%	145	0.92%	34	0.22%	4,674	29.67%	15,757
Rockland	4,241	46.87%	2,221	24.55%	2,302	25.44%	178	1.97%	87	0.96%	19	0.21%	1,939	21.43%	9,048
Saratoga	5,296	36.16%	6,401	43.71%	2,640	18.03%	31	0.21%	272	1.86%	4	0.03%	-1,105	-7.55%	14,644
Schenectady	5,345	32.19%	5,230	31.49%	2,220	13.37%	3,456	20.81%	245	1.48%	111	0.67%	115	0.70%	16,607
Schoharie	3,355	51.58%	2,391	36.76%	580	8.92%	41	0.63%	136	2.09%	2	0.03%	964	14.82%	6,505
Schuyler	1,416	37.15%	1,649	43.26%	527	13.82%	84	2.20%	128	3.36%	8	0.21%	-233	-6.11%	3,812
Seneca	2,573	38.07%	2,336	34.57%	1,082	16.01%	198	2.93%	543	8.03%	26	0.38%	237	3.50%	6,758
St. Lawrence	5,329	28.52%	8,404	44.98%	4,221	22.59%	341	1.82%	362	1.94%	28	0.15%	-3,075	-16.46%	18,685
Steuben	7,396	38.97%	5,986	31.54%	4,109	21.65%	649	3.42%	813	4.28%	27	0.14%	1,410	7.43%	18,980
Suffolk	7,878	40.08%	5,595	28.47%	5,484	27.90%	344	1.75%	319	1.62%	35	0.18%	2,283	11.61%	19,655
Sullivan	3,864	47.75%	3,039	37.56%	961	11.88%	136	1.68%	79	0.98%	13	0.16%	825	10.19%	8,092
Tioga	2,400	37.31%	2,642	41.08%	1,052	16.36%	126	1.96%	199	3.09%	13	0.20%	-242	-3.77%	6,432
Tompkins	3,272	40.38%	2,237	27.61%	2,068	25.52%	123	1.52%	377	4.65%	26	0.32%	1,035	12.77%	8,103
Ulster	8,510	43.58%	7,485	38.33%	2,951	15.11%	151	0.77%	406	2.08%	23	0.12%	1,025	5.25%	19,526
Warren	2,802	35.17%	3,155	39.60%	1,608	20.18%	255	3.20%	127	1.59%	21	0.26%	-353	-4.43%	7,968
Washington	3,555	31.68%	4,593	40.94%	2,605	23.22%	198	1.76%	255	2.27%	14	0.12%	-1,038	-9.26%	11,220
Wayne	3,934	33.26%	4,770	40.32%	2,574	21.76%	82	0.69%	461	3.90%	8	0.07%	-836	-7.06%	11,829
Westchester	21,160	39.40%	15,843	29.50%	15,051	28.02%	1,345	2.50%	289	0.54%	23	0.04%	5,317	9.90%	53,711
Wyoming	2,541	32.05%	2,838	35.79%	2,270	28.63%	61	0.77%	212	2.67%	7	0.09%	-297	-3.74%	7,929
Yates	1,456	33.34%	1,795	41.10%	905	20.72%	83	1.90%	115	2.63%	13	0.30%	-339	-7.76%	4,367
Totals	655,573	41.27%	455,487	28.68%	390,093	24.56%	63,434	3.99%	19,455	1.22%	4,273	0.27%	200,086	12.79%	1,588,315

==== Counties that flipped from Republican to Democratic ====
- Cattaraugus
- Chemung
- Columbia
- Erie
- Greene
- Hamilton
- Herkimer
- Kings
- Lewis
- Monroe
- Nassau
- Niagara
- Oneida
- Otsego
- Putnam
- Rensselaer
- Rockland
- Schenectady
- Seneca
- Steuben
- Suffolk
- Sullivan
- Tompkins
- Ulster
- Westchester

== Analysis ==
Although Theodore Roosevelt finished strong for a third-party candidate with 24.56% of the vote, New York was not amongst his strongest states. New York's Republican Party organization and traditional Republican voters proved to be mostly loyal to President Taft as the official Republican nominee. While Roosevelt came in second place nationally ahead of Taft, Taft beat Roosevelt in New York State and finished second in the state behind Wilson. While Taft won the most counties in New York State, 32 compared to Wilson's 29, Roosevelt failed to win a single county in New York State. As a result, Roosevelt was the last candidate to claim an electoral vote in a presidential election without winning any county in his home state until Mitt Romney 100 years later. (Note: James B. Weaver, the Populist candidate in 1892, is the only other case since the Civil War: he won five states but no county in his home state of Iowa.) Debs performed best in upstate Schenectady County, where he broke 20% of the vote, and it was the only county in the state where Debs finished third, ahead of Roosevelt. In the more sparsely populated rural counties of Upstate New York, Debs tended to be beaten down into fifth place by Prohibition candidate Chafin. While Debs got 3.99% of New York state's vote compared to Chafin's 1.22%, Debs finished below Chafin in 34 of the state's 61 counties.

Wilson won many counties in New York which have been Republican bastions for most of history. However, aside from Schoharie County, every upstate county won by Wilson was won with a plurality of less than fifty percent of the vote and some with less than forty percent. He was the first Democrat to win Cattaraugus County since 1836, Herkimer, Tompkins, and Steuben counties since 1852, Lewis County since 1876, Monroe and Nassau counties for the first time ever, Oneida, Suffolk, Sullivan, and Otsego counties since 1884, and Putnam County since 1868.

Wilson won pluralities in several suburban counties surrounding New York City and in Long Island, as well as several in upstate New York, that would not vote Democratic again until Lyndon B. Johnson swept the state in the 1964 Democratic landslide, namely Cattaraugus, Columbia, Herkimer, Lewis, Nassau, Putnam, Seneca, Steuben, Suffolk, Tompkins, Ulster, and Westchester counties.

Johnson alone has since won Putnam and Steuben Counties. Despite Wilson's relatively strong showing on the county map, upstate New York nevertheless remained one of the most loyally Republican regions in the nation in the 1912 election, and the majority of counties in the region still favored Taft. Taft's most significant wins in the state were his victories in Albany County, home to the state capital of Albany, and Onondaga County, home to the city of Syracuse, while most of his victories came from the many rural counties upstate. However, due to the Republican split, Wilson became the first Democrat to carry the state outside of New York City since 1852, albeit with a 15,000-vote plurality. This would not occur again until 1964.

== See also ==
- United States presidential elections in New York
- Presidency of William Howard Taft
- Presidency of Woodrow Wilson
