= 1916 United States presidential election in New York =

- November 7, 1916
- Turnout: 71.6% ▼0.5 pp
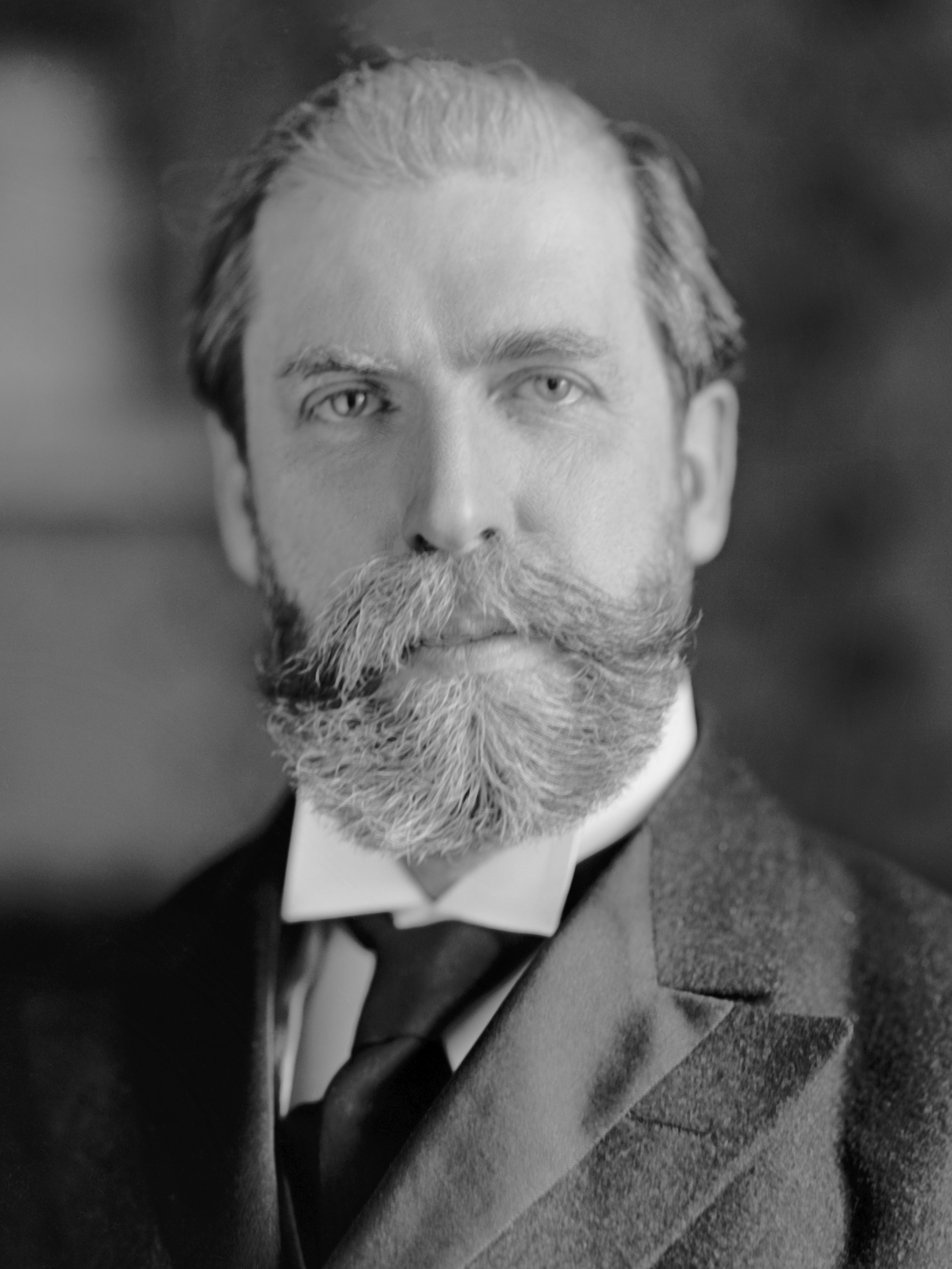

Nominee	Charles Evans Hughes	Woodrow Wilson
Party	Republican	Democratic
Alliance	American
Home state	New York	New Jersey
Running mate	Charles W. Fairbanks	Thomas R. Marshall
Electoral vote	45	0
Popular vote	879,238	759,426
Percentage	51.53%	44.51%
County results
Hughes
40–50%
50–60%
60–70%
Wilson
40–50%
50–60%
President before election
Woodrow Wilson
Democratic
Elected President
Woodrow Wilson
Democratic

The 1916 United States presidential election in New York took place on November 7, 1916. All contemporary 48 states were part of the 1916 United States presidential election. Voters chose 45 electors to the Electoral College, which selected the president and vice president.

New York was won by the Republican nominee, U.S. Supreme Court Justice Charles Evans Hughes of New York, and his running mate Indiana Senator Charles W. Fairbanks. Hughes and Fairbanks defeated the Democratic nominees, incumbent Democratic President Woodrow Wilson and Vice President Thomas R. Marshall.

A former Governor of New York, Hughes won his home state fairly comfortably, taking 51.53% of the vote to Wilson's 44.51%, a victory margin of 7.02%. Coming in a distant third was Socialist candidate Allan L. Benson, who took 2.69%, with a sizeable number of Benson's voters in the state being Jewish Americans in New York City.

New York during the Fourth Party System was usually a Republican state in presidential elections; however in 1912, a strong third party run by former Republican President Theodore Roosevelt against the incumbent Republican President William Howard Taft had split the Republican vote, and had enabled Woodrow Wilson as the Democratic candidate to win New York State's electoral votes in 1912 with a plurality of only 41%. With the Republicans re-united behind Charles Evans Hughes in 1916, and criticism of Wilson's policies already emanating from the Democrats' Irish-American base, New York returned to the Republican column, and delivered a fairly comfortable win to Hughes even as Wilson won re-election nationwide. Hughes' 7% margin of victory made New York State a strong 10% more Republican than the national average in the 1916 election.

Nonetheless, this was the last occasion until 1964 that the Democratic Party carried Hamilton County, Schoharie County, Otsego County and Chemung County. With the exception of Chemung, these were historically German or Dutch and usually Democratic rural counties that would turn permanently to the GOP amidst the fallout from World War I. Hughes' victory in the state made him the second Republican presidential candidate to win New York without winning the election, the first was John C. Frémont in 1856 and the third was Thomas E. Dewey in 1948. Hughes also became the first losing candidate to win the state since Samuel J. Tilden in 1876.

== Results ==
1916 United States presidential election in New York
Party	Candidate	Votes	Percentage	Electoral votes
Republican	Charles Evans Hughes	879,238	51.53%	45
Democratic	Woodrow Wilson (incumbent)	759,426	44.51%	0
Socialist	Allan L. Benson	45,944	2.69%	0
Prohibition	Frank Hanly	19,031	1.12%	0
Socialist Labor	Arthur E. Reimer	2,666	0.16%	0
Totals		1,706,305	100.0%	45

=== New York City results ===
1916 Presidential Election in New York City		Manhattan	The Bronx	Brooklyn	Queens	Staten Island	Total	
Democratic	Woodrow Wilson	139,547	47,870	125,625	31,350	8,843	353,235	50.15%
Democratic	Woodrow Wilson	52.55%	49.76%	48.79%	45.70%	53.60%	353,235	50.15%
Republican	Charles Evans Hughes	113,254	40,938	120,752	34,670	7,319	316,933	45.00%
Republican	Charles Evans Hughes	42.65%	42.55%	46.90%	50.54%	44.36%	316,933	45.00%
Socialist	Allan L. Benson	12,013	6,995	10,220	2,356	204	31,788	4.51%
Socialist	Allan L. Benson	4.52%	7.27%	3.97%	3.43%	1.24%	31,788	4.51%
Socialist Labor	Arthur E. Reimer	485	306	415	104	23	1,333	0.19%
Socialist Labor	Arthur E. Reimer	0.18%	0.32%	0.16%	0.15%	0.14%	1,333	0.19%
Prohibition	Frank Hanly	261	95	445	115	109	1,025	0.15%
Prohibition	Frank Hanly	0.10%	0.10%	0.17%	0.17%	0.66%	1,025	0.15%
TOTAL		265,560	96,204	257,457	68,595	16,498	704,314	100.00%

=== Results by county ===
County	Charles Evans Hughes Republican		Woodrow Wilson Democratic		Allan L. Benson Socialist		Frank Hanly Prohibition		Arthur E. Reimer Socialist Labor		Margin		Total votes cast
County	#	%	#	%	#	%	#	%	#	%	#	%	Total votes cast
Albany	26,628	58.00%	18,799	40.95%	285	0.62%	159	0.35%	41	0.09%	7,829	17.05%	45,912
Allegany	6,308	62.57%	3,191	31.65%	94	0.93%	486	4.82%	2	0.02%	3,117	30.92%	10,081
Bronx	40,938	42.55%	47,870	49.76%	6,995	7.27%	95	0.10%	306	0.32%	-6,932	-7.21%	96,204
Broome	11,445	53.34%	8,906	41.51%	209	0.97%	883	4.12%	13	0.06%	2,539	11.83%	21,456
Cattaraugus	8,825	54.49%	6,565	40.53%	377	2.33%	421	2.60%	9	0.06%	2,260	13.95%	16,197
Cayuga	7,831	53.31%	6,391	43.51%	117	0.80%	336	2.29%	14	0.10%	1,440	9.80%	14,689
Chautauqua	14,782	62.19%	7,153	30.09%	924	3.89%	864	3.63%	47	0.20%	7,629	32.10%	23,770
Chemung	6,409	43.59%	7,461	50.74%	220	1.50%	609	4.14%	5	0.03%	-1,052	-7.15%	14,704
Chenango	5,198	54.77%	3,887	40.96%	54	0.57%	345	3.64%	6	0.06%	1,311	13.81%	9,490
Clinton	4,986	53.68%	4,130	44.47%	21	0.23%	148	1.59%	3	0.03%	856	9.22%	9,288
Columbia	5,314	51.35%	4,938	47.71%	24	0.23%	71	0.69%	2	0.02%	376	3.63%	10,349
Cortland	4,521	59.21%	2,693	35.27%	105	1.38%	314	4.11%	3	0.04%	1,828	23.94%	7,636
Delaware	6,266	53.74%	4,986	42.76%	153	1.31%	248	2.13%	7	0.06%	1,280	10.98%	11,660
Dutchess	11,082	54.60%	8,906	43.88%	133	0.66%	151	0.74%	26	0.13%	2,176	10.72%	20,298
Erie	53,638	52.35%	45,622	44.53%	2,305	2.25%	447	0.44%	448	0.44%	8,016	7.82%	102,460
Essex	4,643	65.39%	2,373	33.42%	21	0.30%	62	0.87%	1	0.01%	2,270	31.97%	7,100
Franklin	5,146	57.59%	3,593	40.21%	17	0.19%	172	1.92%	8	0.09%	1,553	17.38%	8,936
Fulton	5,756	54.35%	4,085	38.57%	425	4.01%	297	2.80%	28	0.26%	1,671	15.78%	10,591
Genesee	5,590	64.39%	2,802	32.27%	19	0.22%	267	3.08%	4	0.05%	2,788	32.11%	8,682
Greene	3,649	49.06%	3,622	48.70%	59	0.79%	104	1.40%	4	0.05%	27	0.36%	7,438
Hamilton	612	48.96%	623	49.84%	3	0.24%	11	0.88%	1	0.08%	-11	-0.88%	1,250
Herkimer	7,934	54.42%	6,271	43.01%	188	1.29%	176	1.21%	11	0.08%	1,663	11.41%	14,580
Jefferson	11,197	58.68%	7,089	37.15%	324	1.70%	454	2.38%	17	0.09%	4,108	21.53%	19,081
Kings	120,752	46.90%	125,625	48.79%	10,220	3.97%	445	0.17%	415	0.16%	-4,873	-1.89%	257,457
Lewis	3,418	54.90%	2,675	42.96%	12	0.19%	120	1.93%	1	0.02%	743	11.93%	6,226
Livingston	5,211	57.66%	3,608	39.92%	18	0.20%	196	2.17%	5	0.06%	1,603	17.74%	9,038
Madison	5,881	57.56%	3,937	38.53%	126	1.23%	260	2.54%	13	0.13%	1,944	19.03%	10,217
Monroe	39,393	61.68%	21,782	34.11%	1,444	2.26%	1,110	1.74%	134	0.21%	17,611	27.58%	63,863
Montgomery	6,704	54.57%	5,347	43.52%	112	0.91%	104	0.85%	18	0.15%	1,357	11.05%	12,285
Nassau	13,910	61.67%	8,430	37.38%	127	0.56%	73	0.32%	15	0.07%	5,480	24.30%	22,555
New York	113,254	42.65%	139,547	52.55%	12,013	4.52%	261	0.10%	485	0.18%	-26,293	-9.90%	265,560
Niagara	12,212	57.54%	8,367	39.42%	317	1.49%	312	1.47%	16	0.08%	3,845	18.12%	21,224
Oneida	18,813	52.54%	16,070	44.88%	367	1.02%	525	1.47%	30	0.08%	2,743	7.66%	35,805
Onondaga	27,815	55.35%	19,892	39.58%	1,113	2.21%	1,369	2.72%	64	0.13%	7,923	15.77%	50,253
Ontario	7,491	56.82%	5,286	40.10%	53	0.40%	349	2.65%	4	0.03%	2,205	16.73%	13,183
Orange	13,619	56.06%	10,198	41.98%	238	0.98%	217	0.89%	23	0.09%	3,421	14.08%	24,295
Orleans	4,903	64.41%	2,529	33.22%	19	0.25%	159	2.09%	2	0.03%	2,374	31.19%	7,612
Oswego	9,854	57.72%	6,210	36.38%	46	0.27%	959	5.62%	3	0.02%	3,644	21.34%	17,072
Otsego	5,926	48.16%	5,975	48.56%	74	0.60%	326	2.65%	3	0.02%	-49	-0.40%	12,304
Putnam	1,717	56.67%	1,290	42.57%	5	0.17%	18	0.59%	0	0.00%	427	14.09%	3,030
Queens	34,670	50.54%	31,350	45.70%	2,356	3.43%	115	0.17%	104	0.15%	3,320	4.84%	68,595
Rensselaer	14,968	51.21%	13,822	47.29%	213	0.73%	201	0.69%	26	0.09%	1,146	3.92%	29,230
Richmond	7,319	44.36%	8,843	53.60%	204	1.24%	109	0.66%	23	0.14%	-1,524	-9.24%	16,498
Rockland	5,041	52.19%	4,469	46.27%	85	0.88%	55	0.57%	9	0.09%	572	5.92%	9,659
Saratoga	8,062	53.00%	6,711	44.12%	154	1.01%	280	1.84%	4	0.03%	1,351	8.88%	15,211
Schenectady	9,759	47.45%	8,962	43.58%	1,446	7.03%	328	1.59%	71	0.35%	797	3.88%	20,566
Schoharie	2,851	43.50%	3,457	52.75%	11	0.17%	233	3.56%	2	0.03%	-606	-9.25%	6,554
Schuyler	1,956	52.38%	1,629	43.63%	13	0.35%	136	3.64%	0	0.00%	327	8.76%	3,734
Seneca	3,307	50.84%	2,845	43.74%	25	0.38%	327	5.03%	1	0.02%	462	7.10%	6,505
St. Lawrence	13,142	66.77%	6,056	30.77%	67	0.34%	407	2.07%	11	0.06%	7,086	36.00%	19,683
Steuben	10,424	53.99%	8,032	41.60%	196	1.02%	645	3.34%	11	0.06%	2,392	12.39%	19,308
Suffolk	12,742	59.20%	8,422	39.13%	168	0.78%	174	0.81%	16	0.07%	4,320	20.07%	21,522
Sullivan	4,340	53.05%	3,659	44.73%	110	1.34%	65	0.79%	7	0.09%	681	8.32%	8,181
Tioga	3,376	52.78%	2,748	42.96%	94	1.47%	172	2.69%	6	0.09%	628	9.82%	6,396
Tompkins	4,736	54.83%	3,455	40.00%	121	1.40%	316	3.66%	10	0.12%	1,281	14.83%	8,638
Ulster	10,734	56.58%	7,807	41.15%	71	0.37%	354	1.87%	5	0.03%	2,927	15.43%	18,971
Warren	4,880	61.47%	2,825	35.58%	126	1.59%	97	1.22%	11	0.14%	2,055	25.88%	7,939
Washington	7,310	63.77%	3,907	34.08%	108	0.94%	135	1.18%	3	0.03%	3,403	29.69%	11,463
Wayne	7,465	58.72%	4,797	37.73%	22	0.17%	427	3.36%	2	0.02%	2,668	20.99%	12,713
Westchester	34,693	59.43%	22,457	38.47%	932	1.60%	195	0.33%	103	0.18%	12,236	20.96%	58,380
Wyoming	4,952	62.14%	2,783	34.92%	22	0.28%	208	2.61%	4	0.05%	2,169	27.22%	7,969
Yates	2,940	61.78%	1,666	35.01%	24	0.50%	129	2.71%	0	0.00%	1,274	26.77%	4,759
Totals	879,238	51.53%	759,426	44.51%	45,944	2.69%	19,031	1.12%	2,666	0.16%	119,812	7.02%	1,706,305

==== Counties that flipped from Democratic to Republican ====
- Cattaraugus
- Columbia
- Erie
- Greene
- Herkimer
- Lewis
- Monroe
- Nassau
- Niagara
- Oneida
- Queens
- Putnam
- Rensselaer
- Rockland
- Schenectady
- Seneca
- Steuben
- Suffolk
- Sullivan
- Tompkins
- Ulster
- Westchester

== See also ==
- United States presidential elections in New York
- Presidency of Woodrow Wilson
