= 1852 United States presidential election in New York =

- November 2, 1852
- Turnout: 84.7% ▲5.1 pp

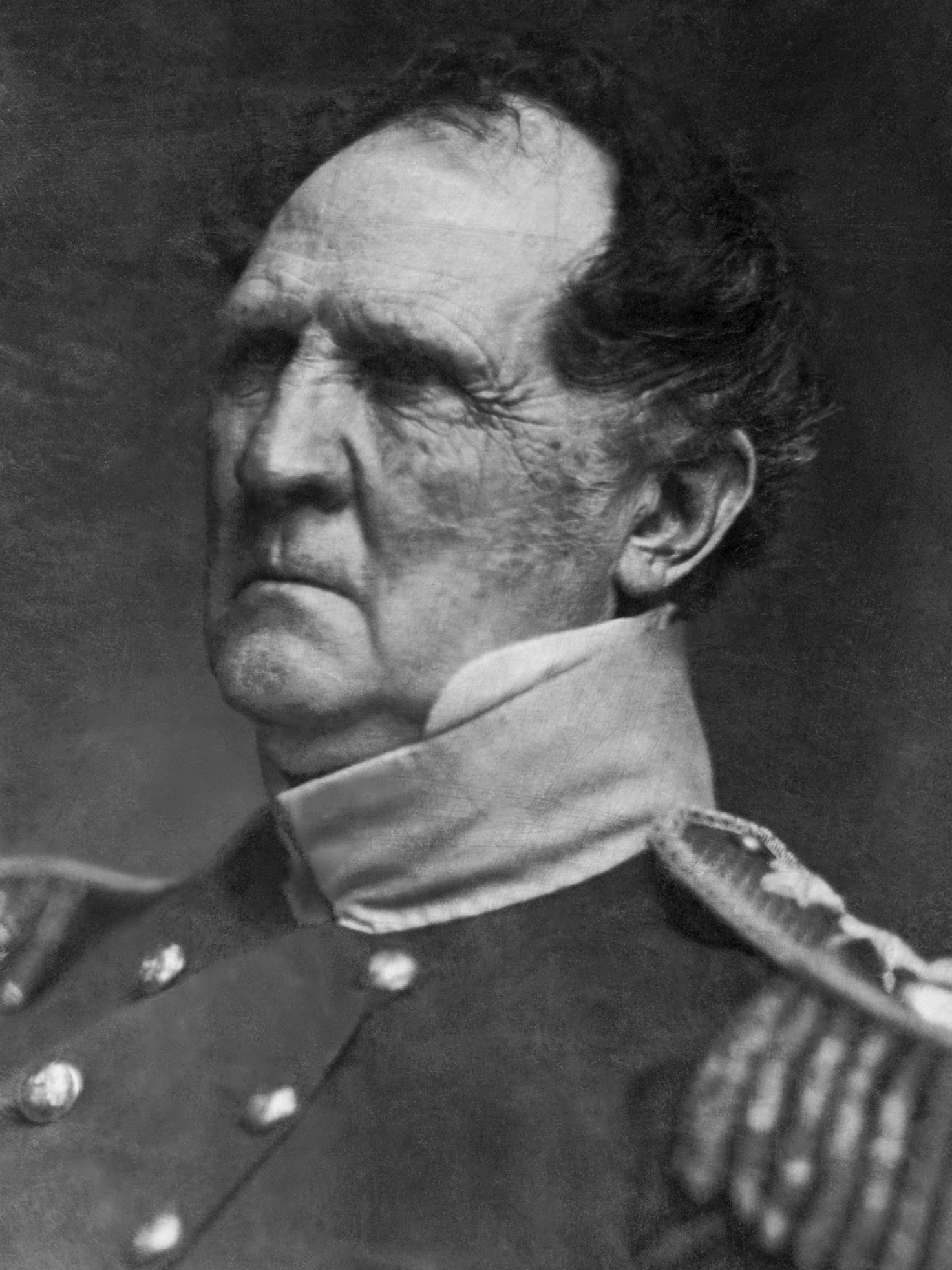
Nominee	Franklin Pierce	Winfield Scott
Party	Democratic	Whig
Home state	New Hampshire	New Jersey
Running mate	William R. King	William Alexander Graham
Electoral vote	35	0
Popular vote	262,456	234,906
Percentage	50.16%	44.89%
County results
Pierce
40–50%
50–60%
60–70%
70–80%
Scott
40–50%
50–60%
President before election
Millard Fillmore
Whig
Elected President
Franklin Pierce
Democratic

The 1852 United States presidential election in New York took place on November 2, 1852, as part of the 1852 United States presidential election. Voters chose 35 representatives, or electors to the Electoral College, who voted for president and vice president.

New York voted for the Democratic candidate, Franklin Pierce, over the Whig Party candidate, Winfield Scott. Pierce won the state by a margin of 5.21%. Abolitionist Free Soil party candidate John P. Hale took 4.85% of the vote. William Goodell of the Liberty Party, another smaller abolitionist party, also took a tiny portion of the vote. So did Daniel Webster, running as a Whig nominated against his will by a group of southern Whigs unsatisfied with Scott. Despite dying nine days before the election, he received 0.08% of the vote, mostly in New York City. This was one of the few northern states where he received votes.

This was the last time a Democrat won the state outside of New York City proper until 1912 and the last until 1964, when Lyndon Johnson swept every New York county, that they received a majority. It was thus the last time until 1964 that many New York Counties voted for a Democrat, namely Allegany, Broome, Chenango, Delaware, Jefferson, Madison, Onondaga, Oswego, St. Lawrence, Tioga, Warren, and Wayne counties.

This was the last election in which the Whigs and not the Republican Party provided the main opposition to the Democrats. After the birth of the Republican Party, upstate New York remained a Republican bastion up until the 1990s.

== Results ==
1852 United States presidential election in New York (Note: Since New York voted for presidential electors directly, the totals below are based on the highest elector on each ticket.)
Party	Candidate	Running mate	Popular vote		Electoral vote	
Party	Candidate	Running mate	Count	%	Count	%
Democratic	Franklin Pierce of New Hampshire	William R. King of Alabama	262,456	50.16%	35	100.00%
Whig	Winfield Scott of New Jersey	William Alexander Graham of North Carolina	234,906	44.89%	0	0.00%
Free Soil	John P. Hale of New Hampshire	George W. Julian of Indiana	25,433	4.86%	0	0.00%
Independent Whig	Daniel Webster of Massachusetts	Charles J. Jenkins of Georgia	413	0.08%	0	0.00%
Liberty	William Goodell of New York	S. M. Bell of Virginia	72	0.01%	0	0.00%
Total			523,280	100.00%	35	100.00%

=== Results by county ===
County	Franklin Pierce Democratic		Winfield Scott Whig		John Parker Hale Free Soil		Daniel Webster Independent Whig		William Goodell Liberty		Margin		Total votes cast
County	#	%	#	%	#	%	#	%	#	%	#	%	Total votes cast
Albany	8,363	53.11%	7,244	46.00%	133	0.84%	8	0.05%	0	0.00%	1,119	7.11%	15,748
Allegany	4,006	47.95%	3,670	43.93%	678	8.12%	0	0.00%	0	0.00%	336	4.02%	8,354
Broome	3,064	50.35%	2,674	43.94%	347	5.70%	0	0.00%	0	0.00%	390	6.41%	6,085
Cattaraugus	3,493	44.85%	3,688	47.35%	607	7.79%	0	0.00%	0	0.00%	-195	-2.50%	7,788
Cayuga	4,852	45.72%	4,838	45.59%	916	8.63%	1	0.01%	6	0.06%	14	0.13%	10,613
Chautauqua	3,703	35.19%	5,612	53.33%	1,209	11.49%	0	0.00%	0	0.00%	-1,909	-18.14%	10,524
Chemung	3,189	54.48%	2,326	39.73%	339	5.79%	0	0.00%	0	0.00%	863	14.74%	5,854
Chenango	4,482	51.71%	3,880	44.77%	303	3.50%	0	0.00%	2	0.02%	602	6.95%	8,667
Clinton	2,812	52.63%	2,286	42.78%	245	4.59%	0	0.00%	0	0.00%	526	9.84%	5,343
Columbia	4,456	51.78%	4,142	48.13%	7	0.08%	0	0.00%	0	0.00%	314	3.65%	8,605
Cortland	2,064	40.90%	2,328	46.13%	655	12.98%	0	0.00%	0	0.00%	-264	-5.23%	5,047
Delaware	4,051	52.75%	3,289	42.83%	339	4.41%	0	0.00%	0	0.00%	762	9.92%	7,679
Dutchess	5,600	50.32%	5,495	49.38%	33	0.30%	0	0.00%	0	0.00%	105	0.94%	11,128
Erie	7,032	45.18%	8,023	51.55%	510	3.28%	0	0.00%	0	0.00%	-991	-6.37%	15,565
Essex	1,973	40.27%	2,756	56.24%	171	3.49%	0	0.00%	0	0.00%	-783	-15.98%	4,900
Franklin	2,074	52.49%	1,747	44.22%	130	3.29%	0	0.00%	0	0.00%	327	8.28%	3,951
Fulton	2,070	47.52%	2,171	49.84%	115	2.64%	0	0.00%	0	0.00%	-101	-2.32%	4,356
Genesee	2,166	37.11%	3,358	57.53%	313	5.36%	0	0.00%	0	0.00%	-1,192	-20.42%	5,837
Greene	3,242	53.49%	2,803	46.25%	16	0.26%	0	0.00%	0	0.00%	439	7.24%	6,061
Hamilton (Note: Voted with Fulton County)	342	73.08%	126	26.92%	0	0.00%	0	0.00%	0	0.00%	216	46.15%	468
Herkimer	4,220	56.60%	2,679	35.93%	555	7.44%	0	0.00%	2	0.03%	1,541	20.67%	7,456
Jefferson	6,279	49.42%	5,656	44.52%	757	5.96%	0	0.00%	13	0.10%	623	4.90%	12,705
Kings	10,624	55.01%	8,491	43.96%	66	0.34%	133	0.69%	0	0.00%	2,133	11.04%	19,314
Lewis	2,535	55.53%	1,727	37.83%	303	6.64%	0	0.00%	0	0.00%	808	17.70%	4,565
Livingston	3,055	40.95%	4,096	54.91%	308	4.13%	0	0.00%	1	0.01%	-1,041	-13.95%	7,460
Madison	3,435	40.81%	3,379	40.14%	1,584	18.82%	0	0.00%	20	0.24%	56	0.67%	8,418
Monroe	6,314	43.37%	7,467	51.29%	775	5.32%	1	0.01%	0	0.00%	-1,153	-7.92%	14,557
Montgomery	3,371	52.57%	3,000	46.79%	40	0.62%	1	0.02%	0	0.00%	371	5.79%	6,412
New York	34,280	59.27%	23,122	39.98%	200	0.35%	235	0.41%	0	0.00%	11,158	19.29%	57,837
Niagara	2,863	39.05%	3,413	46.55%	1,056	14.40%	0	0.00%	0	0.00%	-550	-7.50%	7,332
Oneida	8,634	49.31%	7,831	44.72%	1,046	5.97%	0	0.00%	0	0.00%	803	4.59%	17,511
Onondaga	6,415	45.11%	6,097	42.87%	1,701	11.96%	7	0.05%	1	0.01%	318	2.24%	14,221
Ontario	3,347	40.33%	4,402	53.04%	547	6.59%	1	0.01%	3	0.04%	-1,055	-12.71%	8,300
Orange	5,171	54.96%	4,221	44.86%	16	0.17%	1	0.01%	0	0.00%	950	10.10%	9,409
Orleans	2,267	41.54%	2,586	47.38%	605	11.08%	0	0.00%	0	0.00%	-319	-5.84%	5,458
Oswego	4,973	43.22%	4,375	38.03%	2,148	18.67%	0	0.00%	9	0.08%	598	5.20%	11,505
Otsego	5,486	51.88%	4,454	42.12%	634	6.00%	0	0.00%	0	0.00%	1,032	9.76%	10,574
Putnam	1,521	64.81%	826	35.19%	0	0.00%	0	0.00%	0	0.00%	695	29.61%	2,347
Queens	2,903	56.60%	2,209	43.07%	12	0.23%	5	0.10%	0	0.00%	694	13.53%	5,129
Rensselaer	6,564	50.60%	6,184	47.67%	218	1.68%	7	0.05%	0	0.00%	380	2.93%	12,973
Richmond	1,324	52.90%	1,147	45.83%	30	1.20%	2	0.08%	0	0.00%	177	7.07%	2,503
Rockland	1,788	70.92%	733	29.08%	0	0.00%	0	0.00%	0	0.00%	1,055	41.85%	2,521
Saratoga	4,292	48.43%	4,498	50.76%	71	0.80%	1	0.01%	0	0.00%	-206	-2.32%	8,862
Schenectady	1,898	53.42%	1,654	46.55%	0	0.00%	1	0.03%	0	0.00%	244	6.87%	3,553
Schoharie	3,846	56.38%	2,958	43.36%	18	0.26%	0	0.00%	0	0.00%	888	13.02%	6,822
Seneca	2,515	50.97%	2,213	44.85%	200	4.05%	1	0.02%	5	0.10%	302	6.12%	4,934
St. Lawrence	5,584	48.39%	4,570	39.60%	1,385	12.00%	0	0.00%	0	0.00%	1,014	8.79%	11,539
Steuben	6,880	55.21%	5,236	42.02%	345	2.77%	0	0.00%	0	0.00%	1,644	13.19%	12,461
Suffolk	3,307	63.28%	1,917	36.68%	0	0.00%	2	0.04%	0	0.00%	1,390	26.60%	5,226
Sullivan	2,681	56.04%	2,059	43.04%	44	0.92%	0	0.00%	0	0.00%	622	13.00%	4,784
Tioga	2,815	53.66%	2,234	42.58%	197	3.76%	0	0.00%	0	0.00%	581	11.08%	5,246
Tompkins	3,472	44.83%	3,410	44.03%	862	11.13%	0	0.00%	0	0.00%	62	0.80%	7,744
Ulster	5,919	53.32%	5,156	46.45%	26	0.23%	0	0.00%	0	0.00%	763	6.87%	11,101
Warren	1,713	56.99%	1,174	39.06%	119	3.96%	0	0.00%	0	0.00%	539	17.93%	3,006
Washington	3,174	40.40%	4,231	53.85%	452	5.75%	0	0.00%	0	0.00%	-1,057	-13.45%	7,857
Wayne	4,050	44.83%	4,033	44.64%	941	10.42%	0	0.00%	10	0.11%	17	0.19%	9,034
Westchester	5,283	56.34%	4,033	43.01%	55	0.59%	6	0.06%	0	0.00%	1,250	13.33%	9,377
Wyoming	2,471	39.84%	3,005	48.44%	727	11.72%	0	0.00%	0	0.00%	-534	-8.61%	6,203
Yates	2,153	48.37%	1,974	44.35%	324	7.28%	0	0.00%	0	0.00%	179	4.02%	4,451
Totals	262,456	50.16%	234,906	44.89%	25,433	4.86%	413	0.08%	72	0.01%	27,550	5.26%	523,280

==== Counties that flipped from Whig to Democratic ====
- Albany
- Allegany
- Broome
- Cayuga
- Chenango
- Clinton
- Columbia
- Dutchess
- Franklin
- Greene
- Jefferson
- Kings
- Madison
- Montgomery
- New York
- Oneida
- Onondaga
- Orange
- Otsego
- Queens
- Rensselaer
- Richmond
- Schenectady
- Schoharie
- Seneca
- Steuben
- Suffolk
- Sullivan
- Tioga
- Tompkins
- Ulster
- Warren
- Westchester
- Yates

==== Counties that flipped from Free Soil to Democratic ====
- Chemung
- Delaware
- Herkimer
- Lewis
- Oswego
- St. Lawrence
- Wayne

== See also ==
- United States presidential elections in New York
