= 1868 United States presidential election in New York =

- November 3, 1868
- Turnout: 91.7% ▲2.4 pp
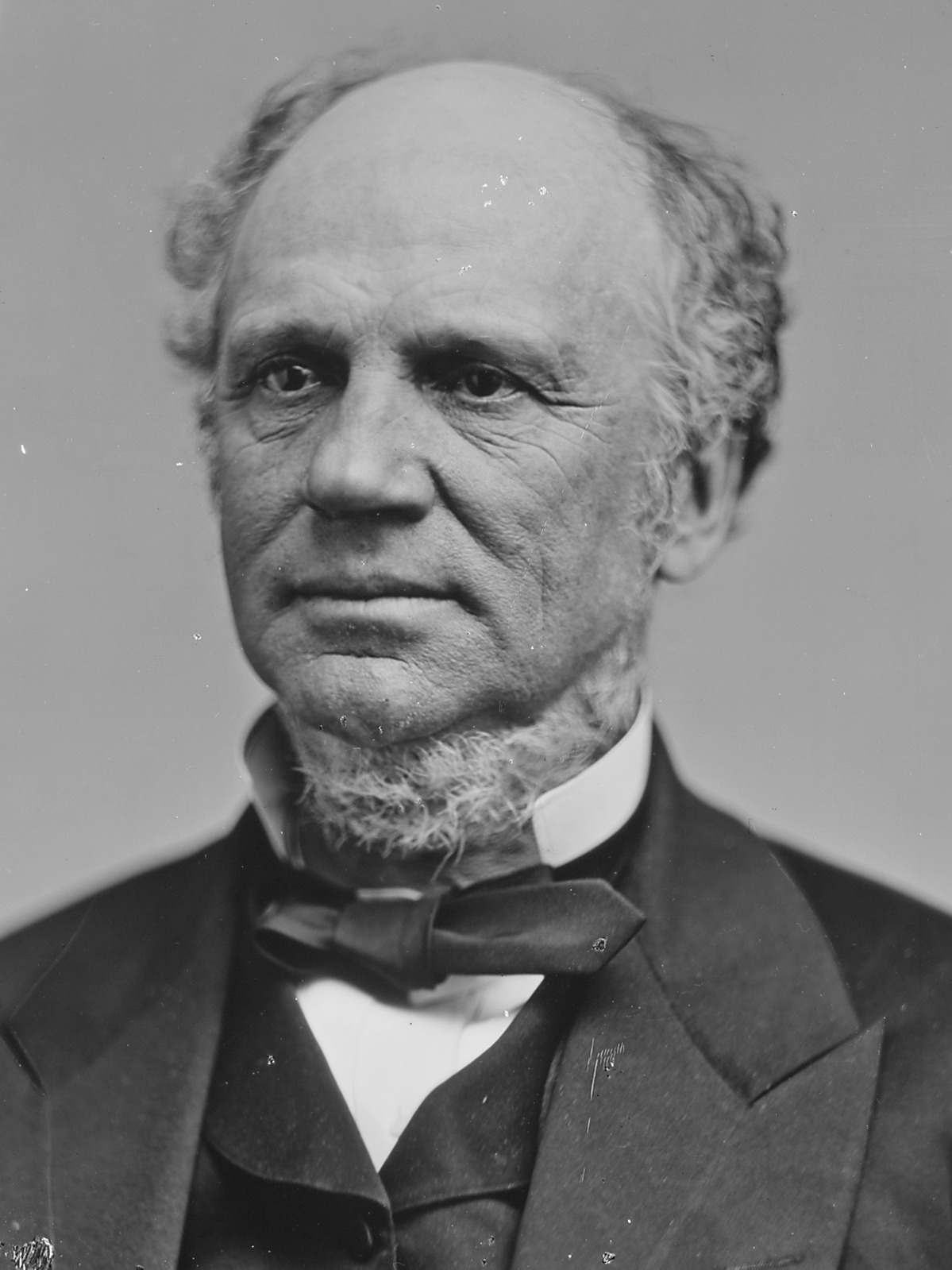

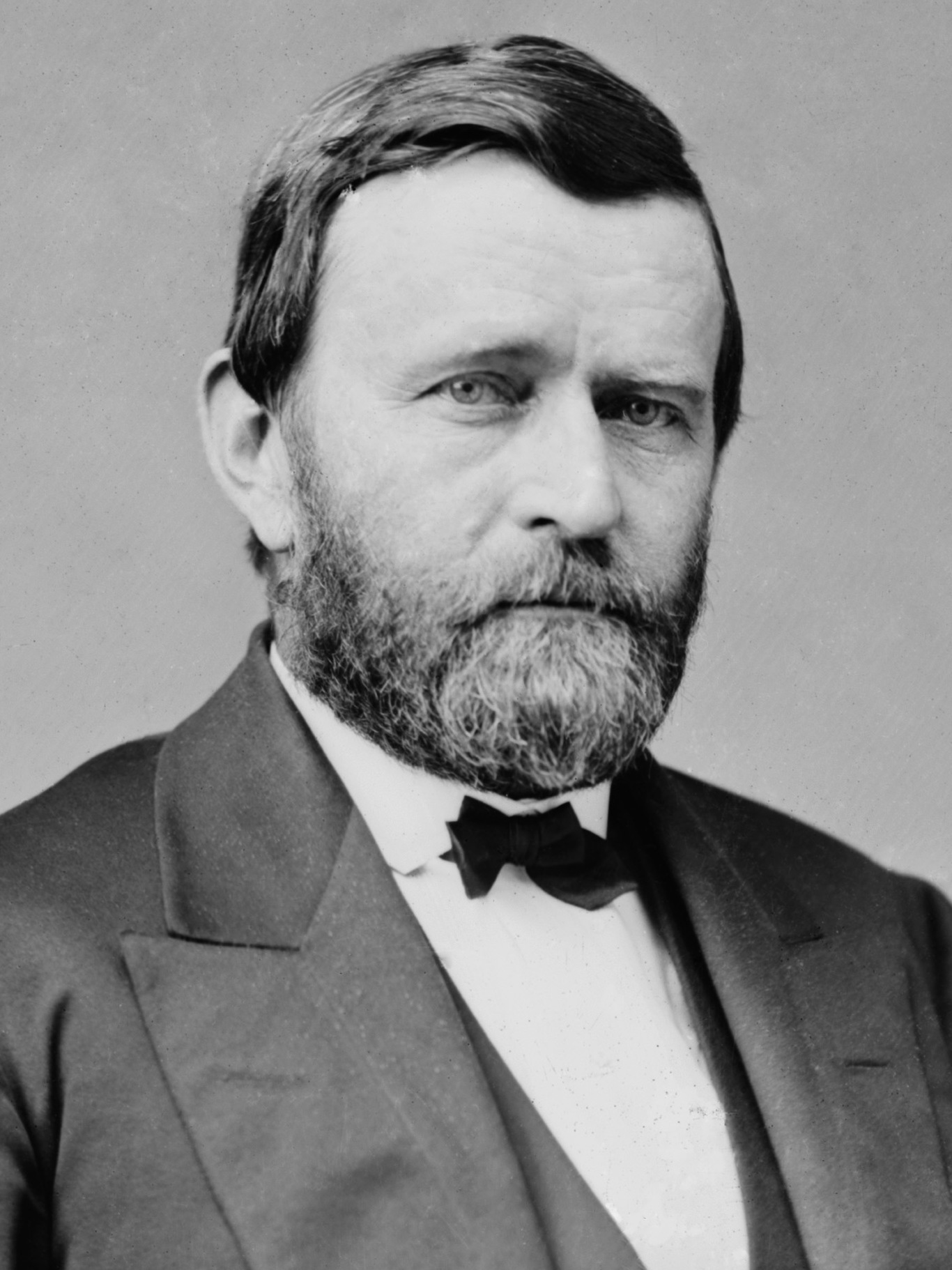
Nominee	Horatio Seymour	Ulysses S. Grant
Party	Democratic	Republican
Home state	New York	Illinois
Running mate	Francis Preston Blair Jr.	Schuyler Colfax
Electoral vote	33	0
Popular vote	429,883	419,915
Percentage	50.59%	49.41%
County results
Seymour
50–60%
60–70%
Grant
50–60%
60–70%
70–80%
President before election
Andrew Johnson
Democratic
Elected President
Ulysses S. Grant
Republican

The 1868 United States presidential election in New York took place on November 3, 1868, as part of the 1868 United States presidential election. Voters chose 33 representatives, or electors to the Electoral College, who voted for president and vice president.

New York voted for the Democratic nominee, former Governor of New York Horatio Seymour, over the Republican nominee, General Ulysses S. Grant. Seymour won his home state by a very narrow margin of 1.18%, making him the first Democratic candidate since Franklin Pierce in 1852 to win the state. Seymour also became the first losing Democratic presidential candidate to win New York.

Seymour received 69.4% of the vote in New York City (which at the time only included New York County); no candidate would exceed that share until Franklin D. Roosevelt in 1936.

== Results ==
1868 United States presidential election in New York (Note: Since New York voted for presidential electors directly, the totals below are based on the highest elector on each ticket.)
Party	Candidate	Running mate	Popular vote		Electoral vote	
Party	Candidate	Running mate	Count	%	Count	%
Democratic	Horatio Seymour of New York	Francis Preston Blair Jr. of Missouri	429,883	50.59%	33	100.00%
Republican	Ulysses S. Grant of Illinois	Schuyler Colfax of Indiana	419,915	49.41%	0	0.00%
Total			849,798	100.00%	33	100.00%

=== Results by county ===
County	Horatio Seymour Democratic		Ulysses S. Grant Republican		Margin		Total votes cast
County	#	%	#	%	#	%	Total votes cast
Albany	14,080	53.70%	12,139	46.30%	1,941	7.40%	26,219
Allegany	2,823	30.10%	6,555	69.90%	-3,732	-39.80%	9,378
Broome	3,885	40.42%	5,727	59.58%	-1,842	-19.16%	9,612
Cattaraugus	3,868	38.60%	6,153	61.40%	-2,285	-22.80%	10,021
Cayuga	4,880	37.14%	8,261	62.86%	-3,381	-25.73%	13,141
Chautauqua	4,441	32.12%	9,387	67.88%	-4,946	-35.77%	13,828
Chemung	3,707	49.99%	3,709	50.01%	-2	-0.03%	7,416
Chenango	4,093	41.06%	5,875	58.94%	-1,782	-17.88%	9,968
Clinton	3,709	46.82%	4,213	53.18%	-504	-6.36%	7,922
Columbia	5,661	51.39%	5,354	48.61%	307	2.79%	11,015
Cortland	2,109	34.07%	4,082	65.93%	-1,973	-31.87%	6,191
Delaware	4,288	43.27%	5,621	56.73%	-1,333	-13.45%	9,909
Dutchess	7,490	47.74%	8,199	52.26%	-709	-4.52%	15,689
Erie	14,454	47.74%	15,822	52.26%	-1,368	-4.52%	30,276
Essex	2,150	37.35%	3,606	62.65%	-1,456	-25.30%	5,756
Franklin	2,264	39.95%	3,403	60.05%	-1,139	-20.10%	5,667
Fulton	2,698	44.41%	3,377	55.59%	-679	-11.18%	6,075
Genesee	2,847	40.09%	4,254	59.91%	-1,407	-19.81%	7,101
Greene	3,954	53.43%	3,447	46.57%	507	6.85%	7,401
Hamilton (Note: Voted with Fulton County)	452	61.33%	285	38.67%	167	22.66%	737
Herkimer	4,109	43.46%	5,346	56.54%	-1,237	-13.08%	9,455
Jefferson	5,883	41.13%	8,421	58.87%	-2,538	-17.74%	14,304
Kings	39,838	58.98%	27,711	41.02%	12,127	17.95%	67,549
Lewis	3,238	48.69%	3,412	51.31%	-174	-2.62%	6,650
Livingston	3,465	41.81%	4,823	58.19%	-1,358	-16.39%	8,288
Madison	3,968	38.77%	6,266	61.23%	-2,298	22.45%	10,234
Monroe	10,019	46.17%	11,682	53.83%	-1,663	-7.66%	21,701
Montgomery	3,810	48.91%	3,980	51.09%	-170	-2.18%	7,790
New York	108,316	69.40%	47,748	30.60%	60,568	38.81%	156,064
Niagara	4,695	47.84%	5,119	52.16%	-424	-4.32%	9,814
Oneida	11,276	47.24%	12,593	52.76%	-1,317	-5.52%	23,869
Onondaga	9,023	42.28%	12,320	57.72%	-3,297	-15.45%	21,343
Ontario	4,163	41.86%	5,782	58.14%	-1,619	-16.28%	9,945
Orange	7,879	49.22%	8,129	50.78%	-250	-1.56%	16,008
Orleans	2,446	38.52%	3,904	61.48%	-1,458	-22.96%	6,350
Oswego	6,108	38.98%	9,562	61.02%	-3,454	-22.04%	15,670
Otsego	6,075	48.05%	6,568	51.95%	-493	-3.90%	12,643
Putnam	1,728	52.60%	1,557	47.40%	171	5.21%	3,285
Queens	6,388	56.23%	4,973	43.77%	1,415	12.45%	11,361
Rensselaer	10,381	49.59%	10,551	50.41%	-170	-0.81%	20,932
Richmond	3,019	57.61%	2,221	42.39%	798	15.23%	5,240
Rockland	2,762	59.68%	1,866	40.32%	896	19.36%	4,628
Saratoga	5,266	44.93%	6,454	55.07%	-1,188	-10.14%	11,720
Schenectady	2,333	48.54%	2,473	51.46%	-140	-2.91%	4,806
Schoharie	4,736	59.05%	3,284	40.95%	1,452	18.10%	8,020
Schuyler	2,040	42.40%	2,771	57.60%	-731	-15.19%	4,811
Seneca	3,287	53.94%	2,807	46.06%	480	7.88%	6,094
St. Lawrence	3,941	24.90%	11,888	75.10%	-7,947	-50.21%	15,829
Steuben	6,461	42.77%	8,647	57.23%	-2,186	-14.47%	15,108
Suffolk	4,185	47.70%	4,589	52.30%	-404	-4.60%	8,774
Sullivan	3,662	52.70%	3,287	47.30%	375	5.40%	6,949
Tioga	3,191	42.47%	4,323	57.53%	-1,132	-15.07%	7,514
Tompkins	3,100	40.02%	4,646	59.98%	-1,546	-19.96%	7,746
Ulster	8,524	51.45%	8,044	48.55%	480	2.90%	16,568
Warren	2,239	45.23%	2,711	54.77%	-472	-9.54%	4,950
Washington	4,063	37.88%	6,662	62.12%	-2,599	-24.23%	10,725
Wayne	4,405	41.06%	6,322	58.94%	-1,917	-17.87%	10,727
Westchester	11,667	54.75%	9,642	45.25%	2,025	9.50%	21,309
Wyoming	2,591	38.01%	4,226	61.99%	-1,635	-23.98%	6,817
Yates	1,750	35.82%	3,136	64.18%	-1,386	-28.37%	4,886
Totals	429,883	50.59%	419,915	49.41%	9,968	1.17%	849,798

==== Counties that flipped from Democratic to Republican ====
- Clinton
- Erie
- Montgomery
- Rensselaer
- Schenectady

== See also ==
- United States presidential elections in New York
