= Crown Point Light =

Lighthouse in New York, United States

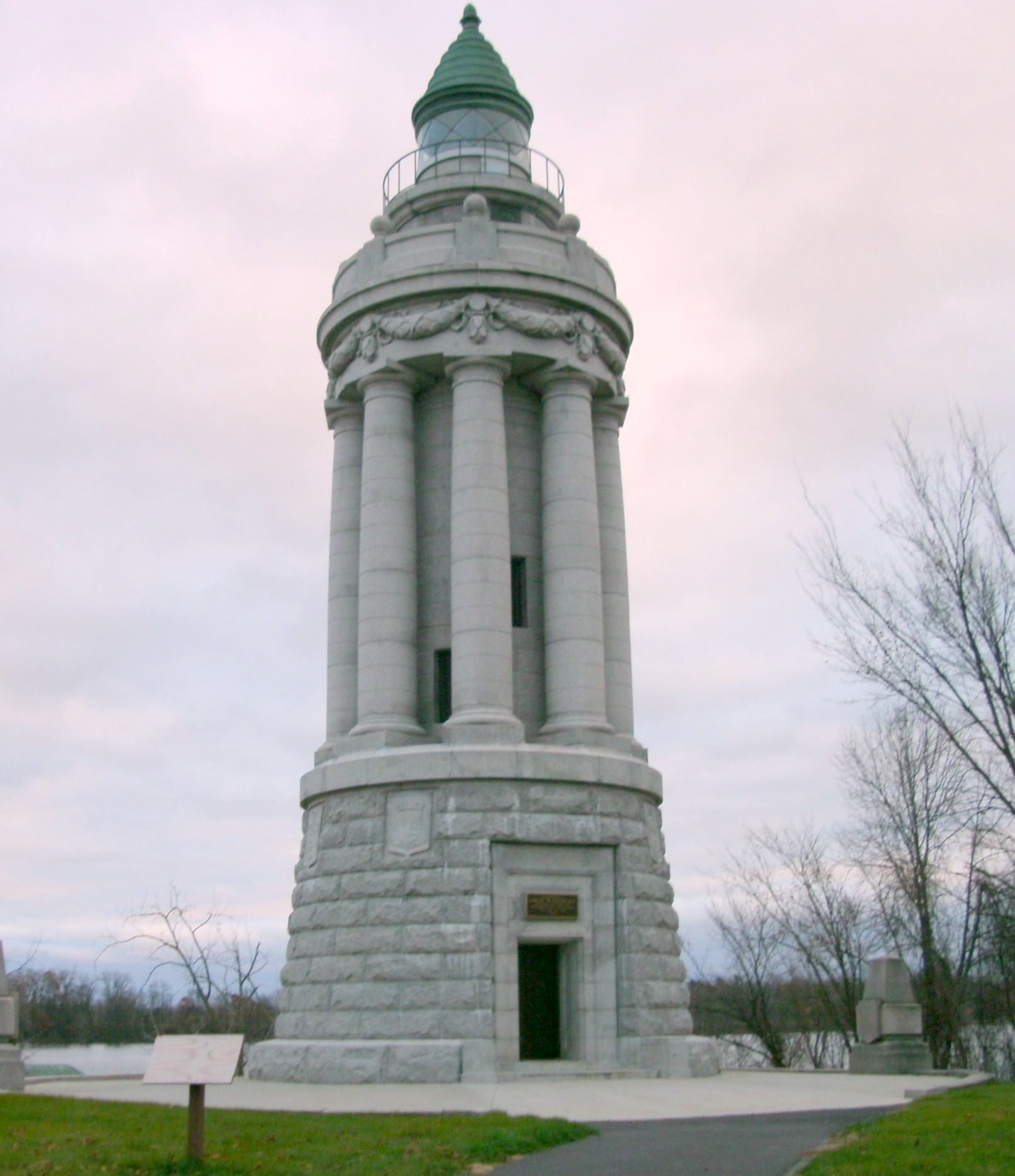
- Champlain Memorial Lighthouse, November 2010
- Location: on Crown Point on Lake Champlain
- Coordinates: 44.0299°N 73.4216°W

Tower
- Construction: stone
- Height: 55 feet (17 m)
- Shape: circular colonnade

Light
- First lit: 1858
- Deactivated: 1926
- Lens: Fifth-order fresnel lens

The Crown Point Light on Lake Champlain is a former lighthouse at Crown Point, New York, that now exists as a memorial to the exploration of the lake by Samuel de Champlain.

== History ==
Requests for a light to mark the point date as far back as 1838, but the original light on this site was erected in 1858 by Ellis and O'Neil, along the same lines as the Windmill Point and Isle La Motte lights, which they constructed in the same period. The light sat on a small point due east of the ruins of Fort St. Frederic, a 1730s - 1750s fort at the tip of the peninsula. The octagonal stone tower and attached keeper's dwelling remained in use, essentially unchanged, into the early 20th century.

The tercentenary of Champlain's explorations of the lake provided the occasion for celebrations marking the event, and commissions from New York and Vermont, put in charge of the festivities, decided to erect a monument. A suggestion in a newspaper prompted the notion to convert an existing lighthouse, and after some consideration of other sites, the Crown Point Light was chosen. The stone sheath of the tower was stripped away, leaving the brick spiral staircase sitting on the foundation. A new tower was constructed on and around this, consisting of a short tapered base, a ring of eight Doric columns, an elaborately carved cornice and parapet, and a new lantern atop the whole. On the side facing the lake, a projection from the base supported a monumental bronze designed by Carl Augustus Heber and cast at the Roman Bronze Works consisting of Champlain accompanied by one fellow Frenchman and one Huron native. The French government sent a plaque by Auguste Rodin which was later placed below the other sculpture. A broad staircase led down to a pier projecting into the lake. A fifth order Fresnel lens continued to shine in the lantern giving a fixed white light, and the old keeper's house remained in place, attached to the new tower by a short passageway. The memorial was dedicated on July 5, 1912 at a ceremony presided over by Governors John Abner Mead of Vermont and John Adams Dix of New York.

The memorial served as an active lighthouse for only fourteen years. In 1926 its light was extinguished, and a small skeleton tower was erected immediately adjacent to the water. In 1931 construction of the Crown Point Bridge obscured the site, and the steel tower was moved to the grounds of the Windmill Point Light as part of the customs service effort to control liquor smuggling on the lake. The property was transferred to the State of New York, which continues to maintain it as part of the state reservation which forms the tip of the peninsula; the keeper's house was demolished, leaving the monument standing alone at the top of the bluff. The tower is marked on navigational charts, but does not currently serve as an aid to navigation.

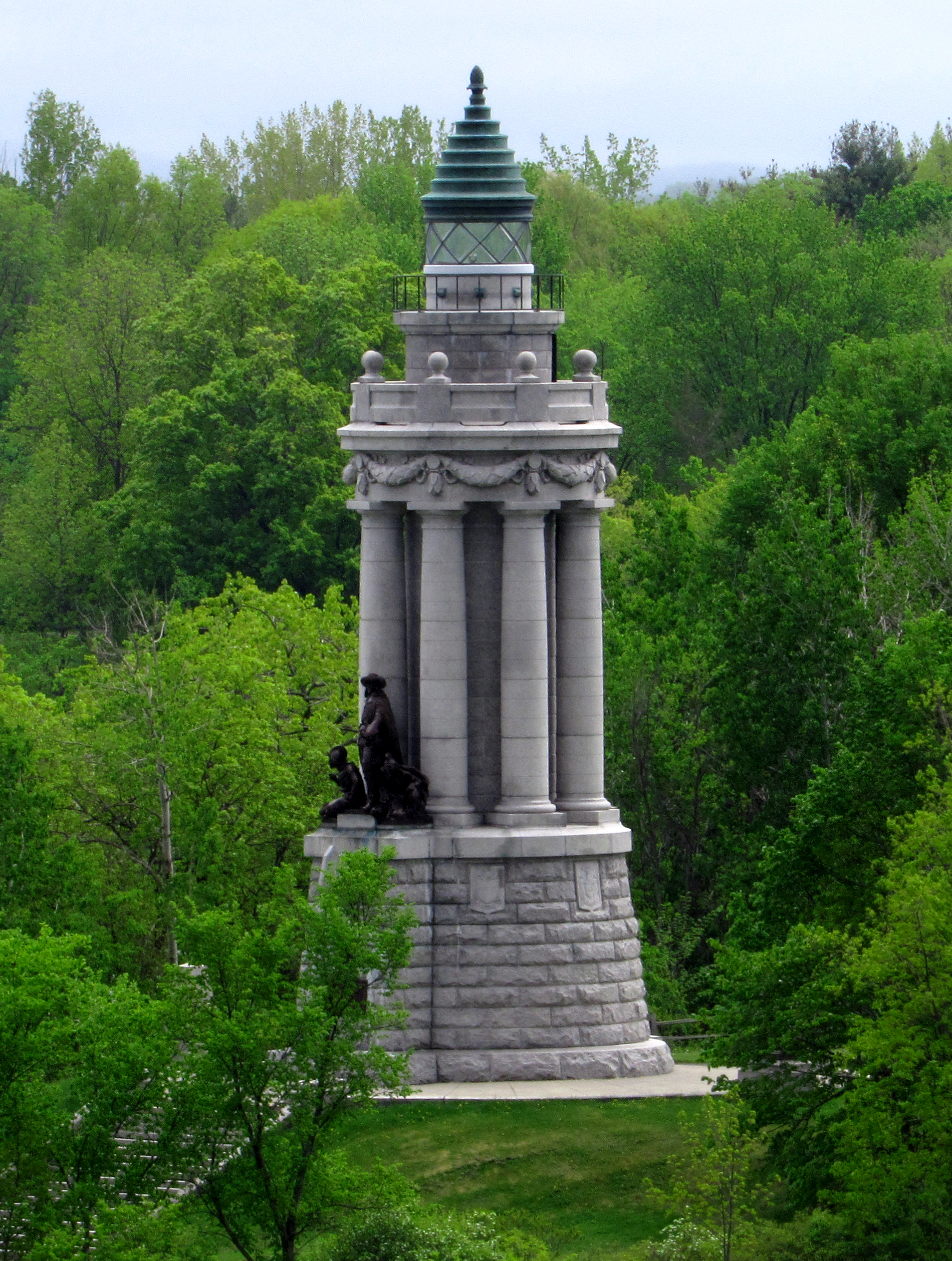
Champlain Memorial Lighthouse in 2018.
