= New York Festival of Light =

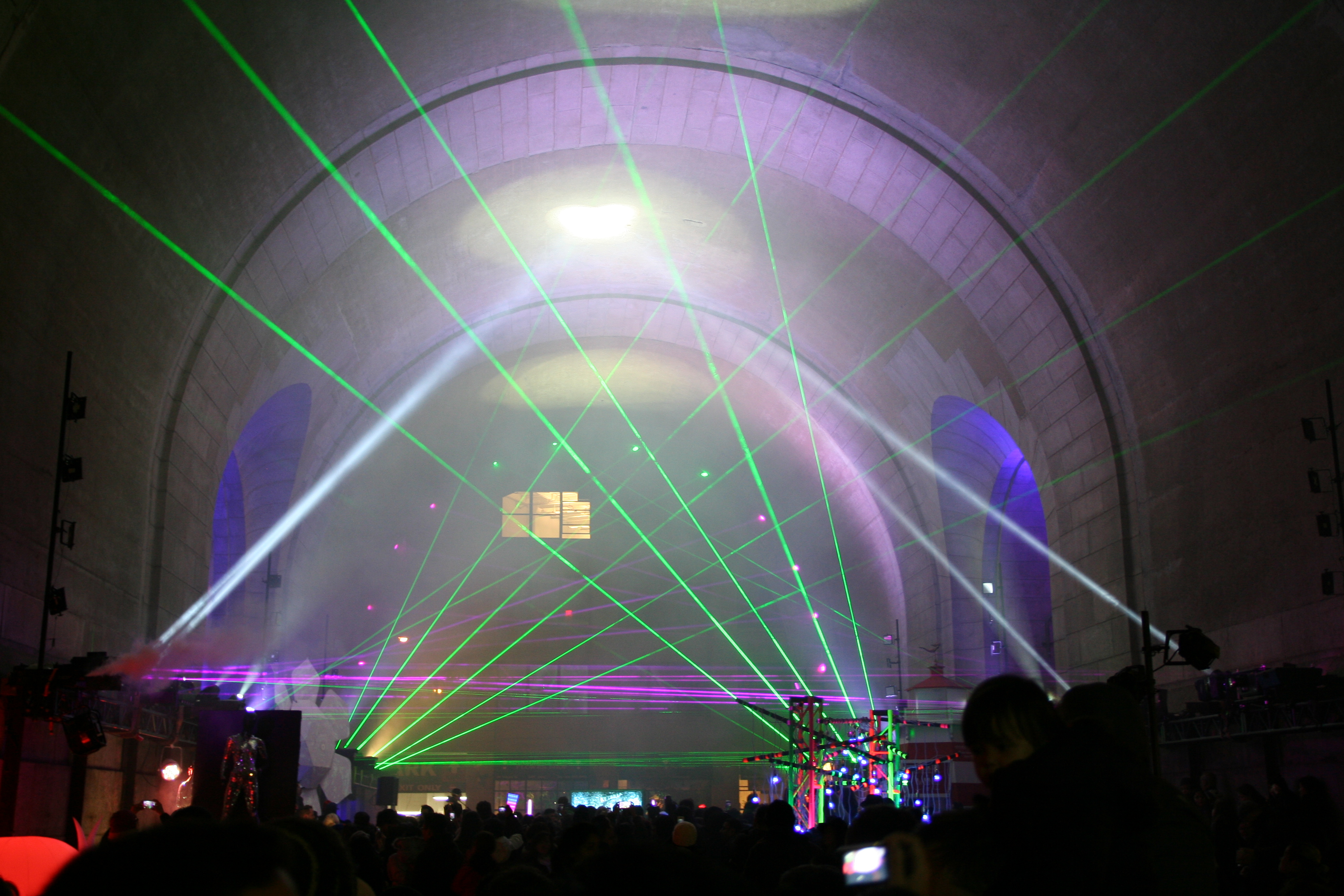
Laser light show under the anchorage of the Manhattan Bridge

New York Festival of Light is an annual festival of lighting installations, DJs, and technology taking place in Dumbo, Brooklyn.

The inaugural event took place November 6–8, 2014. The eastern side of the Manhattan Bridge anchorage at Anchorage Place and Water Street served as a canvas for video art, while the space under the bridge itself housed an elaborate laser light show. Almost 20 artists were featured, showcasing elements of light, technology and other multimedia.
