= Carl Augustus Heber =

American sculptor

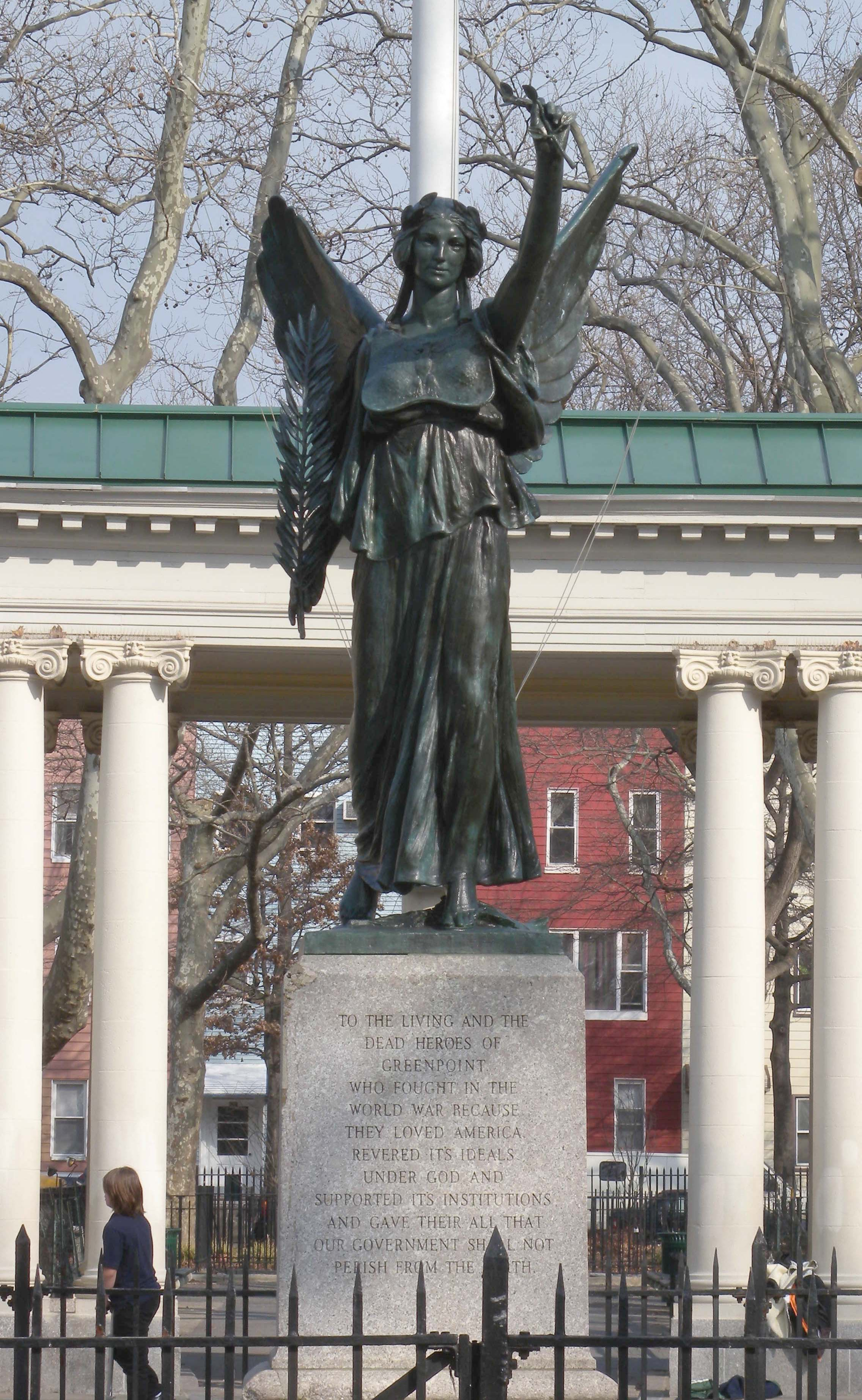
Memorial in Greenpoint, Brooklyn

Carl Augustus Heber (April 15, 1874 or 1875 –1956) was an American sculptor noted for his public monuments.

Heber was born in Stuttgart, Germany and at a young age moved to Dundee, Illinois. He moved to Chicago where he studied at the Art Institute of Chicago with Lorado Taft. He continued his studies in Paris at the Académie Julian and the École des Beaux-Arts before returning to the United States. He eventually settled in New York City and many of his works can be found in New York state.

Heber was a member of the National Sculpture Society and exhibited at their 1923 exhibit.

== Selected works ==
Heber's works include:

- General Philip Sheridan Monument, equestrian statue, Somerset, Ohio, 1905
- Schiller Monument, Schiller Park, Rochester, New York, 1907
- Virgil, or Roman Epic Poetry, allegorical statue on the Brooklyn Museum, Brooklyn, New York, 1909
- Spirit of Industry and Spirit of Commerce granite reliefs on the Manhattan Bridge, New York, New York, 1909-1914
- Champlain Memorial, Crown Point Light, Crown Point, New York, another casting in Plattsburgh, New York, 1912
- Charles J. Everett Memorial, Goshen, New York, 1916
- James W. Husted Memorial, Peekskill, New York, 1917
- War Memorial, New York County Courthouse, New York, New York 1919 or 1920
- Veterans Monument, Wausau, Wisconsin, 1923
- Greenpoint War Memorial (World War I), McGolrick Park, Brooklyn, NY ca. 1923
- Herald of the Dawn, Grand View Cemetery, Batavia, New York, 1925
