= Windmill Point Light (Vermont) =

Lighthouse in Vermont, United States

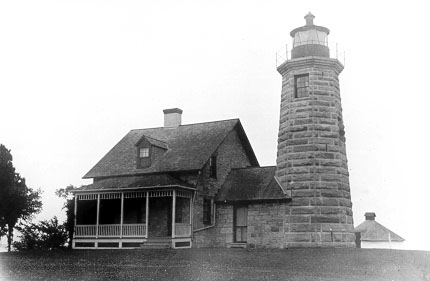
- Undated photograph of Windmill Point Light (USCG)
- Location: West of Alburgh, Vermont on Lake Champlain
- Coordinates: 44.9818°N 73.3418°W

Tower
- Constructed: 1830
- Foundation: Surface rock
- Construction: Blue limestone
- Height: 40 feet (12 m)
- Shape: Octagonal
- Markings: Natural with pink lantern

Light
- First lit: 1858, relit 8/7/2002
- Deactivated: 1931-2002
- Lens: Sixth order Fresnel lens (original), 1.15 amp 12 inches (300 mm) prototype (current)
- Range: 9 nautical miles (17 km; 10 mi)
- Characteristic: Flashing white every 4 seconds

The Windmill Point Light in Vermont is the northernmost lighthouse on Lake Champlain. Extinguished for seventy years, it was reactivated in 2002 to replace the skeleton tower erected next to it.

It is named after the Windmill Point peninsula, where it is located.

== History ==
The first lighthouse on this site was privately erected in 1830. In 1858, the Lighthouse Service contracted with the Ellis and O'Neil firm to erect the present octagonal tower, which is connected directly to the keeper's house. Together with the Isle La Motte Light, it forms a rough line marking the channel through the center of the lake. It remained in service until 1931, when a steel tower was erected on the property with an automated acetylene light on top. The keeper's house was transferred to the customs service for use in battling smuggling during Prohibition. The tower and house were eventually sold to a private individual.

In 1963 the light was purchased by Lockwood Clark, who had come across the then-owner while showing his bride-to-be around the point. In 2001, he was approached by the Coast Guard about returning the light to the original tower. This would have not only the sentimental value of bringing the old light back to life, but would save the Coast Guard a considerable sum, as the steel towers were in need of expensive refurbishment if not replacement. In August 2002 a new solar powered beacon was installed in the old tower, the first of a series of such restorations on the lake. The light is still in service and remains an active aid to navigation.
