= Manhattan Bridge =

Suspension bridge in New York City

- View from the East River towards Manhattan, 2023
- Coordinates: 40.7070°N 73.9905°W
- Carries: 7 lanes of roadway; 4 tracks of the trains of the New York City Subway; Pedestrians and bicycles; Streetcars (until 1929)
- Crosses: East River
- Locale: New York City (Manhattan–Brooklyn)
- Maintained by: New York City Department of Transportation
- ID number: 2240028 (upper); 2240027 (lower)

Characteristics
- Design: Suspension bridge
- Total length: 6,855 ft (2,089 m)
- Width: 120 feet (37 m)
- Height: 336 ft (102 m) (towers)
- Longest span: 1,480 feet (451 m)
- Clearance below: 135 ft (41.1 m)

History
- Designer: Leon Moisseiff
- Constructed by: Othniel Foster Nichols
- Construction start: 1901
- Construction end: 1909
- Opened: December 31, 1909; 116 years ago

Statistics
- Daily traffic: 67,851 (2019)
- Toll: Variable congestion charge (Manhattan-bound)

U.S. National Register of Historic Places
- Designated: August 30, 1983
- Reference no.: 83001694
- Designated entity: Manhattan Bridge

New York State Register of Historic Places
- Designated: July 6, 1983
- Reference no.: 04701.000010

New York City Landmark
- Designated: November 25, 1975
- Reference no.: 0899
- Designated entity: Manhattan Bridge Arch and Colonnade

Location
- Interactive map of Manhattan Bridge

The Manhattan Bridge is a suspension bridge that crosses the East River in New York City, connecting Lower Manhattan at Canal Street with Downtown Brooklyn at the Flatbush Avenue Extension. Designed by Leon Moisseiff, the bridge has a total length of 6,855 ft (2,089 m). The bridge is one of four vehicular bridges directly connecting Manhattan Island and Long Island; the nearby Brooklyn Bridge is just slightly farther west, while the Queensboro and Williamsburg bridges are to the north.

The bridge was proposed in 1898 and was originally called "Bridge No. 3" before being renamed the Manhattan Bridge in 1902. Foundations for the bridge's suspension towers were completed in 1904, followed by the anchorages in 1907 and the towers in 1908. The Manhattan Bridge opened to traffic on December 31, 1909, and began carrying streetcars in 1912 and New York City Subway trains in 1915. The eastern upper-deck roadway was installed in 1922. After streetcars stopped running in 1929, the western upper roadway was finished two years later. The uneven weight of subway trains crossing the Manhattan Bridge caused it to tilt to one side, necessitating an extensive reconstruction between 1982 and 2004.

The Manhattan Bridge was the first suspension bridge to use a Warren truss in its design. It has a main span of 1,480 ft (451 m) between two 350 feet (110m) suspension towers. The deck carries seven vehicular lanes, four on an upper level and three on a lower level, as well as four subway tracks, two each flanking the lower-level roadway. The span is carried by four main cables, which travel between masonry anchorages at either side of the bridge, and 1,400 vertical suspender cables. Carrère and Hastings designed ornamental plazas at both ends of the bridge, including an arch and colonnade in Manhattan that is a New York City designated landmark. The bridge's use of light trusses influenced the design of other long suspension bridges in the early 20th century.

== Development ==
The bridge was the last of the three suspension spans built across the lower East River, following the Brooklyn and Williamsburg bridges. After the City of Greater New York was formed in 1898, the administration of mayor Robert Anderson Van Wyck formed a plan for what became the Manhattan Bridge; these plans were repeatedly revised and were not finalized until after George B. McClellan Jr. became mayor in 1901. From the outset, the bridge was planned to have a central roadway, streetcar tracks, elevated tracks, and sidewalks, and it was to run straight onto an extension of Flatbush Avenue in Brooklyn.

In the earliest plans it was to have been called "Bridge No. 3", but was given the name Manhattan Bridge in 1902. When the name was confirmed in 1904, The New York Times criticized it as "meaningless", lobbied for one after Brooklyn's Wallabout Bay, and railed that the span "would have geographical and historical significance if it were known as the Wallabout Bridge". In 1905, the Times renewed its campaign, stating, "All bridges across the East River are Manhattan bridges. When there was only one, it was well enough to call it the Brooklyn Bridge, or the East River Bridge".

=== Planning and caissons ===
The earliest plans for what became the Manhattan Bridge were designed by R. S. Buck. These plans called for a suspension bridge with carbon steel wire cables and a suspended stiffening truss, supported by a pair of towers with eight braced legs. This design would have consisted of a main span of 1,470 feet (450 m) and approaches of 725 feet (221 m) each. In early 1901, the city government approved a motion to acquire land for a suspension tower in Brooklyn; the city shortly began soliciting bids for the tower's foundations. The contract for the Brooklyn suspension tower was awarded in May 1901.

The caisson under the tower on the Brooklyn side was installed in March 1902; workers excavated dirt for the foundations from within the caisson, a process that was completed in December 1902. Three workers had died while working on the Brooklyn-side tower's caisson. A plan for the bridge was announced in early 1903. Elevated and trolley routes would use the Manhattan Bridge, and there would be large balconies and enormous spaces within the towers' anchorages. Work on the Manhattan caisson had commenced in January 1903; it was towed to position in July, and the caisson work was completed by January 1904. The foundations were completed in March 1904. A $10 million grant for the bridge's construction was granted in May 1904 with the expectation that work on the bridge would start later that year.

The Municipal Art Commission raised objections to one of the bridge's plans in June 1904, which delayed the start of construction. Another set of plans was unveiled that month by New York City Bridge Commissioner Gustav Lindenthal, in conjunction with Henry Hornbostel. The proposal also called for each of the suspension towers to be made of four columns, to be braced transversely and hinged to the bottom of the abutments longitudinally. The same span dimensions from Buck's plan were used because work on the masonry pier foundations had already begun. Additionally, the towers would have contained Modern French detail, while the anchorages would have been used for functions such as meeting halls. Lindenthal's plan was also rejected due to a dispute over whether his plan, which used eyebars, was better than the more established practice of using wire cables. The Municipal Art Commission voted in September 1904 to use wire cables on the bridge.

Lindenthal was ultimately dismissed and a new design was commissioned from Leon Moisseiff. George Best replaced Lindenthal as the city's bridge commissioner and discarded the eyebar plans in favor of the wire cables. Hornbostel was replaced by Carrère and Hastings as architectural consultants. By late 1904, the disputes over the types of cables had delayed the contract for the bridge's superstructure (composed of its towers and deck). The bridge's completion had been delayed by two years, and its cost had increased by $2 million. The cable dispute was not fully resolved until 1906, when Best's successor James W. Stevenson announced that the bridge would use wire cables.

=== Anchorages, towers, and approach viaducts ===
Best reviewed bids for the construction of the anchorages in December 1904. The Williams Engineering Company received the $2 million contract for the anchorages' construction. Construction commenced on the Brooklyn anchorage in February 1905 and on the Manhattan anchorage that April. The foundation subcontractors excavated the foundations of each anchorage using sheet pilings. Barges were used to transport material from the East River to the anchorages' sites. Mixers constructed the masonry for the anchorages at a rate of up to 550 cubic yards (420 m^{3}) per day. During mid-1905, officials condemned land in Manhattan and Brooklyn for the bridge's approaches; the land acquisition was partially delayed because the contractors rented out houses that were supposed to be demolished. By the end of the year, the city's bridge department was planning to erect streetcar terminal buildings at either end of the bridge.

To avoid the delays that had occurred during the Williamsburg Bridge's construction, Best planned to award a single large contract for the towers and the deck, rather than splitting the work into multiple contracts. He began soliciting bids for the metalwork in July 1905, at which point the bridge was to use 44,000 short tons (39,000 long tons; 40,000 t) of metal. The Pennsylvania Steel Company received the contract in August 1905 after submitting a low bid of $7.248 million, and a competing bidder sued to prevent the contract from being awarded to Pennsylvania Steel. In November, a New York Supreme Court judge ruled that the contract with Pennsylvania Steel was illegal, as the bidding process had been designed to shut out other bidders. Although Best tried to appeal the Supreme Court's decision, the contract was re-advertised anyway; Pennsylvania Steel refused to submit another bid. When Stevenson became the bridge commissioner at the beginning of 1906, he ordered that new bridge specifications be created. Stevenson received bids for the steelwork in May 1906, and the Ryan-Parker Construction Company received the contract the next month, following delays caused by an injunction and threats of lawsuits.

The Ryan-Parker Company hired the Phoenix Bridge Company in September 1906 to fabricate the steelwork. The Phoenix Bridge Company's 2,000 workers began making beams, girders, eyebars, and other parts of the bridge at the firm's factory in Phoenixville, Pennsylvania. The anchorages were less than half complete, in part because of inclement weather and material shortages. That November, the Board of Estimate and Apportionment approved $4 million for land acquisition in Manhattan and $300,000 for land acquisition in Brooklyn. By early 1907, the city had spent over $6 million on the bridge; the bridge's total cost was estimated at $20 million. To speed up the bridge's completion, Manhattan borough president Bird Sim Coler considered implementing night shifts. By February 1907, the Phoenix Bridge Company was manufacturing steel faster than it could be installed, and the steel for the anchorages was done. The company had also begun fabricating beams for the towers. Land acquisition for an extension of Flatbush Avenue to the bridge began in March, and the first steel girders of the towers were lifted in place the next month. The first steel pedestals for the towers were installed on June 26, 1907. The anchorages were nearly done by late 1907; they could not be completed until the cables were finished.

The city government acquired land for the approaches in October 1907; this required the relocation of several hundred families in Brooklyn and nearly 1,000 families in Manhattan. In total, about 145 lots in Brooklyn and 173 lots in Manhattan were obtained for the bridge's approaches and plazas. Some Brooklyn residents requested additional time to relocate. Residents in the path of the Manhattan approach also protested efforts to evict them, though they were relocated at the beginning of December 1907. Later that month, four companies submitted bids for the construction of the bridge's Manhattan and Brooklyn approach spans. John C. Rodgers submitted a low bid of $2.17 million for the viaducts, and Stevenson requested that amount from the Board of Estimate. By the beginning of 1908, most of the land had been cleared, and the suspension towers had been built to above the height of the deck. The Manhattan tower was finished that March, followed by the Brooklyn tower the next month. Land acquisition was nearly done by the middle of that year.

=== Cables and deck ===
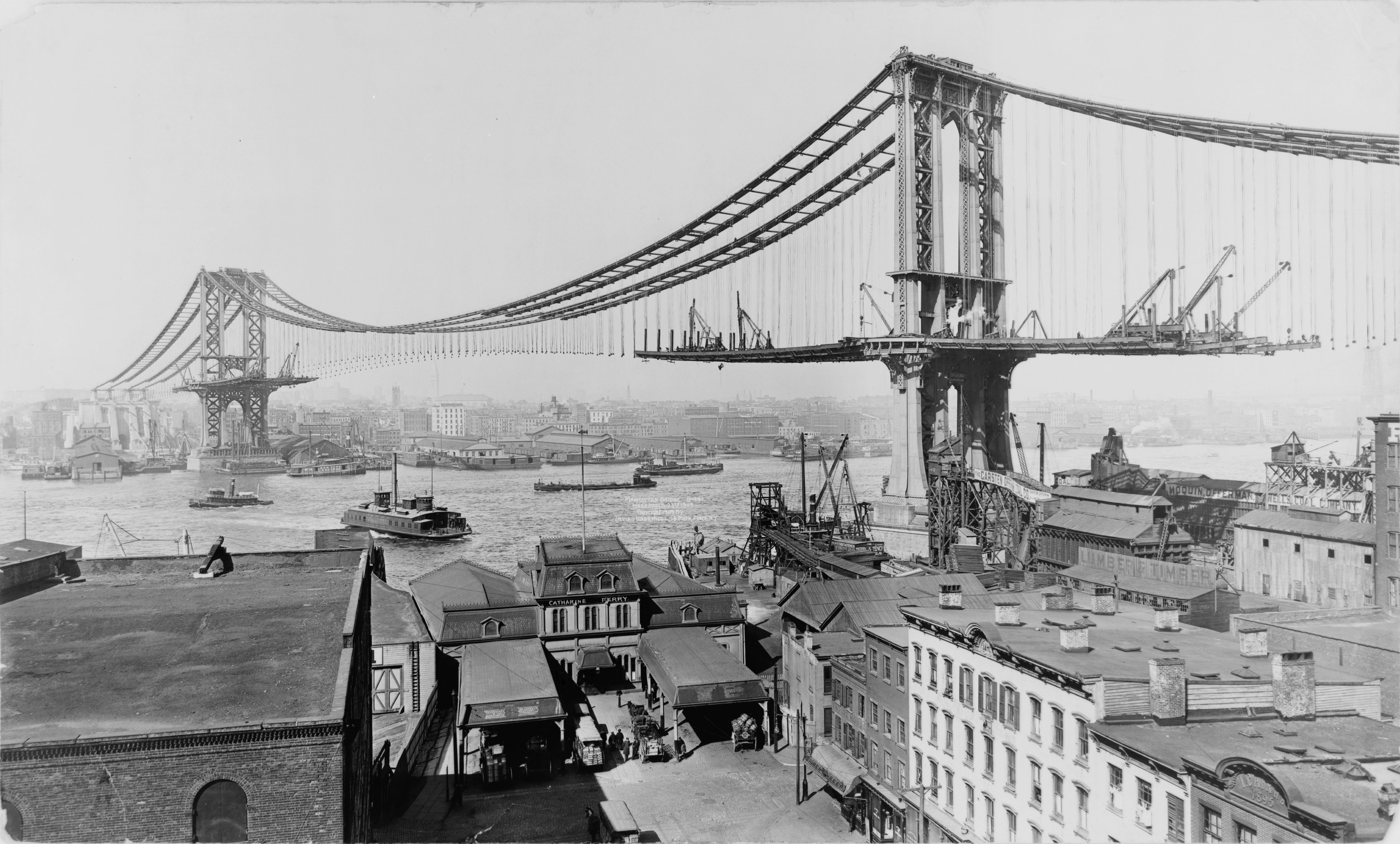
The Manhattan Bridge under construction in March 1909

Andrew McC. Parker of the Ryan-Parker Company had predicted in January 1908 that the cables would be strung within two months. The Roebling & Sons Company started manufacturing the wires for the cables before the towers were finished, while the Glyndon Contracting Company was hired to lay the wires. Around 8,500 short tons (7,600 long tons; 7,700 t) of nickel steel wires were manufactured at the Carbon Steel Works in Pittsburgh. Workers began stringing temporary cables on June 15, 1908; the first wire broke loose while it was being strung, injuring two people. By this time, the construction cost had increased to $22 million. The temporary cables supported temporary footbridges between each tower, which were completed in mid-July. When the footbridges were finished, workers installed guide wires, which were laid as continuous loops. Two guide wheels, one at either end of each guide wire, carried the main cables' wires across the river between each anchorage. These wheels were powered by a motor atop the Brooklyn anchorage. In addition, reels of wire were stored at both ends of the bridge. The guide wheels laid up to 100 short tons (89 long tons; 91 t) of wire every day.

The last wires for the main cables were strung in December 1908. That month, the Board of Estimate and Apportionment hired engineer Ralph Modjeski to review the engineering drawings for the Manhattan Bridge, after the City Club of New York expressed concerns over the bridge's safety. Afterward, the Glyndon Construction Company installed the vertical suspender cables, which were hung from the main cables. By the beginning of 1909, the bridge was planned to open at the end of the year, but the subway tracks, streetcar tracks, and Flatbush Avenue Extension were not complete. Around 60 million pounds (27,000 long tons; 27,000 t) of red steel girders and floor panels for the bridge's deck had been delivered to a yard in Bayonne, New Jersey. The girders and panels were delivered to the bridge's site starting in February 1909, and the first floor panel in the main span was installed the same month. Each of the girders was hung from a pair of suspender cables, and floor panels were hung between the girders at a rate of four panels a day. It took workers three weeks to install the floor panels; and the last panel was installed on April 7, 1909.

The bridge commissioner received $1 million from the Board of Estimate and Apportionment for the completion of the roadway, subway tracks, and other design details. The trusses and side spans were built after the floor of the main span was completed. Carbon Steel began wrapping the main cables together in May 1909; the wrapping process required 140 short tons (120 long tons; 130 t) of wire, and the company was able to wrap five to seven segments of cables per day. All work on the cables was finished in August 1909, almost exactly a year after the first strand of the first main cable was strung. Workers then installed ornamentation on the tops of the towers and bronze collars on each of the main cables. Modjeski reported that September that the bridge was safe. At the time, the plazas were incomplete, and Flatbush Avenue Extension was unpaved; the bridge commissioner was razing buildings near the Manhattan plaza by that November. The Brooklyn Daily Eagle reported that there was widespread discontent over the fact that streetcar and subway service would not be ready for the bridge's opening.

== Operational history ==
=== Opening and early history ===
Stevenson announced at the end of November 1909 that the bridge's roadways would likely open by December 24, although the transit lines and pedestrian walkways were not complete. One hundred prominent Brooklyn citizens walked over the bridge on December 4, 1909; at the time, the subway tracks were unfinished, and there was uncertainty over which company would use the streetcar tracks. Outgoing mayor George B. McClellan Jr. toured the bridge on December 24. The span officially opened on December 31, 1909, at a final cost of $26 million, although work was still incomplete. Empty commercial vehicles tended to use the Manhattan Bridge, while trucks with full loads used the Brooklyn Bridge, since the Manhattan Bridge's wood-block pavement was less sturdy than the Brooklyn Bridge's plank pavement.

A fire on the Brooklyn side damaged the bridge in early 1910, necessitating the replacement of some cables and steel. Though both of the Manhattan Bridge's footpaths were initially closed to the public, the northern footpath opened in July 1910; the southern footpath was scheduled to be opened the next month. Streetcars began running across the bridge in September 1912, and the bridge's subway tracks opened in June 1915. By the mid-1910s, a food market operated under the bridge. Meanwhile, C. J. Sullivan sued the Ryan-Parker Construction Company, claiming that he had helped the company secure the general contract for the bridge. He was awarded just over $300,000 in 1912, an amount that was increased to over $380,000 in 1916.

After the bridge opened, Carrère and Hastings drew up preliminary plans for a Beaux Arts-style entrance to the bridge in Manhattan and a smaller approach on the Brooklyn side. The city's Municipal Art Commission approved a $700,000 plan for the bridge's Manhattan approach in April 1910. The final plans were approved in 1912, and construction began the same year. The city allocated $675,000 for a plaza at the Brooklyn end in March 1913, including a subway tunnel under the plaza, and the Northeastern Construction Company submitted the low bid for the plaza's construction. The arch and colonnade were completed in 1915, while the pylons on the Brooklyn side were installed in November 1916. The bridge approaches cost just over $1.53 million to construct. In an attempt to speed up automotive traffic, in 1918, the New York City Police Department banned horse-drawn vehicles from crossing the bridge toward Brooklyn during the morning rush hour and toward Manhattan during the evening rush hour. One of the two streetcar lines across the bridge was discontinued in 1919.

=== 1920s to 1940s ===
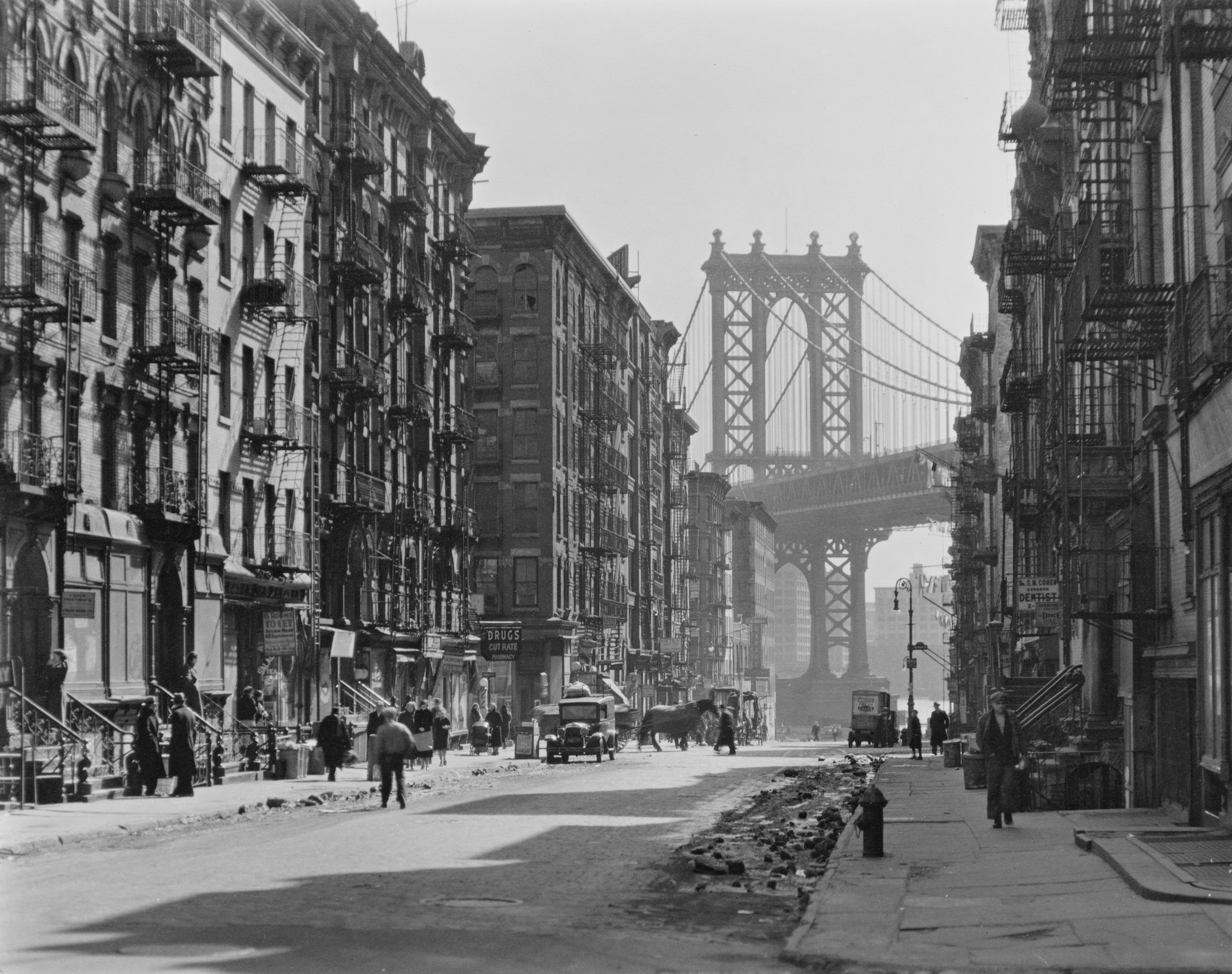
View down Pike Street toward the Manhattan Bridge, 1936, photograph by Berenice Abbott

During late 1920, the bridge's roadway was used as a reversible lane between 7 am and 7 pm each day; this restriction caused heavy congestion. Grover Whalen, the commissioner of Plant and Structures, announced that September that he would request funding to repaint the bridge. The span was repainted during the next year at a cost of $240,000. Meanwhile, the bridge was carrying 27,000 daily vehicles by the early 1920s, and one traffic judge said the lower deck was too narrow to accommodate the increasing traffic levels on the bridge. In March 1922, the city government started constructing the eastern upper-deck roadway at a cost of $300,000. The roadway opened that June. The next month, Whalen banned horse-drawn vehicles from the Manhattan Bridge and motor vehicles from the Brooklyn Bridge. The upper roadway of the Manhattan Bridge was converted to a reversible lane, while the lower roadway carried two-way traffic at all times. Whalen said the restriction would allow both levels to be used to their full capacity; the decision ended up placing additional loads on the bridge.

To reduce congestion at the Manhattan end, left-hand traffic was implemented on the lower level during the 1920s, as most vehicles heading into Manhattan turned left at the end of the bridge. Motorists continued to use the Manhattan Bridge even after the Brooklyn Bridge reopened to motorists in 1925, contributing to heavy congestion during rush hours. At the time, the Brooklyn Bridge carried 10,000 vehicles a day (in part due to its low speed limit), while the Manhattan Bridge carried 60,000 vehicles daily. When the lower level was repaved in early 1927, Manhattan-bound traffic was temporarily banned from the lower level at night. That October, Brooklyn borough president James J. Byrne proposed replacing the Three Cent Line's trolley tracks with a roadway; he estimated that it would cost $9 million to construct a brand-new roadway, while converting the trolley tracks would cost only $600,000. The comptroller approved the plan in September 1928, and the city formally voted to buy the Three Cent Line for just over $200,000 the following month. The Three Cent Line was discontinued in November 1929.

The Three Cent Line tracks were replaced by the western upper-deck roadway. Initially scheduled to be completed by July 1930, the roadway ultimately opened in June 1931 and carried Brooklyn-bound traffic. The eastern upper-deck roadway was converted to carry Manhattan-bound traffic, and the center roadway was turned into a lane for buses and trucks. At the time, nearly 65,000 vehicles used the bridge every day, of which nearly a quarter were buses and trucks. A set of 119 streetlights were installed on the upper level the following year. To increase traffic flow, both upper roadways were temporarily converted to reversible lanes during rush hours in 1934; the lower roadway was repaired, and the bridge was repainted the same year. The city's commissioner of plant and structures also requested $725,000 in federal funds for various repairs. During 1937, the city awarded a contract to repair the bridge's steelwork and raised the railings on the upper roadways. The city government announced in 1938 that it would replace the lower deck's wooden pavement with a steel-and-concrete pavement; the repaving was completed that December. Simultaneously, the railings on the upper roadways were raised again.

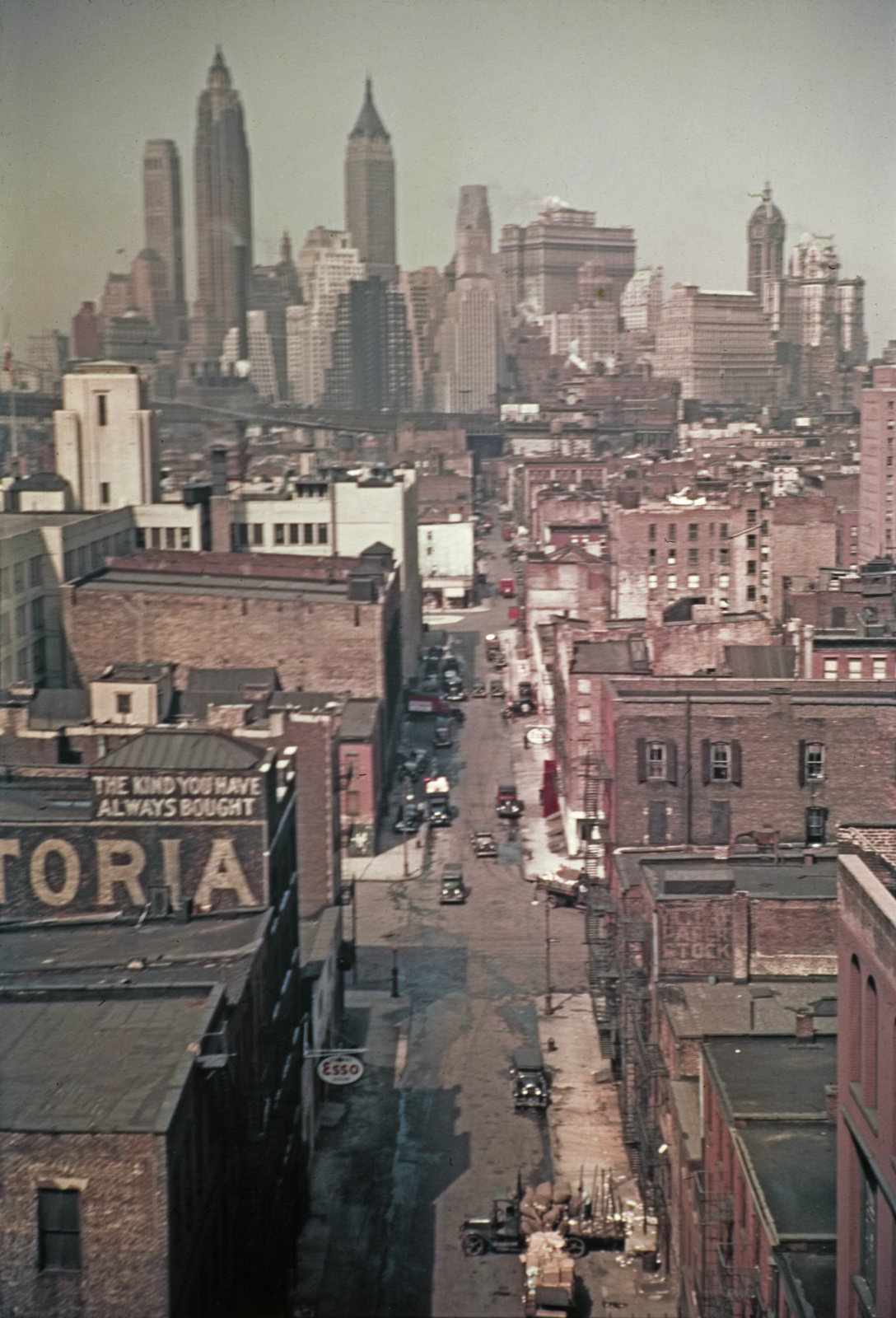
View from the Manhattan Bridge toward Lower Manhattan in 1938

As part of a Works Progress Administration project, a ramp at the Brooklyn end of the bridge was widened in 1941, replacing a dangerous reverse curve. By then, 90,000 vehicles a day used the span. An air raid siren was also installed on the bridge during World War II. By the mid-1940s, the Brooklyn approach to the bridge was one of the most congested areas in New York City.

=== 1950s to 1970s ===
The upper roadways were repaired during 1950. Similar repairs to the lower roadway were postponed until the Brooklyn–Battery Tunnel opened, as the Brooklyn Bridge was also being rebuilt around the same time. To ease congestion, the Manhattan Bridge's western upper roadway began carrying Manhattan-bound traffic during the morning in March 1950. Floodlights and barbed-wire fences were installed at the bases of the bridge's anchorages in 1951, during the Cold War, and the anchorages themselves were sealed to protect against sabotage. Manhattan-bound traffic stopped using the western upper roadway during the morning in August 1952. Instead, two of the three lower-level lanes began carrying Manhattan-bound traffic during the morning; previously, Manhattan-bound vehicles could use only one of the lower-level lanes at all times. By the mid-1950s, there were frequent car accidents on the Manhattan Bridge, which injured 411 people and killed nine people between 1953 and 1955 alone. In addition, the bridge carried nearly 79,000 cars, 18,000 trucks, and 200 buses on an average day.

==== 1950s repair project ====
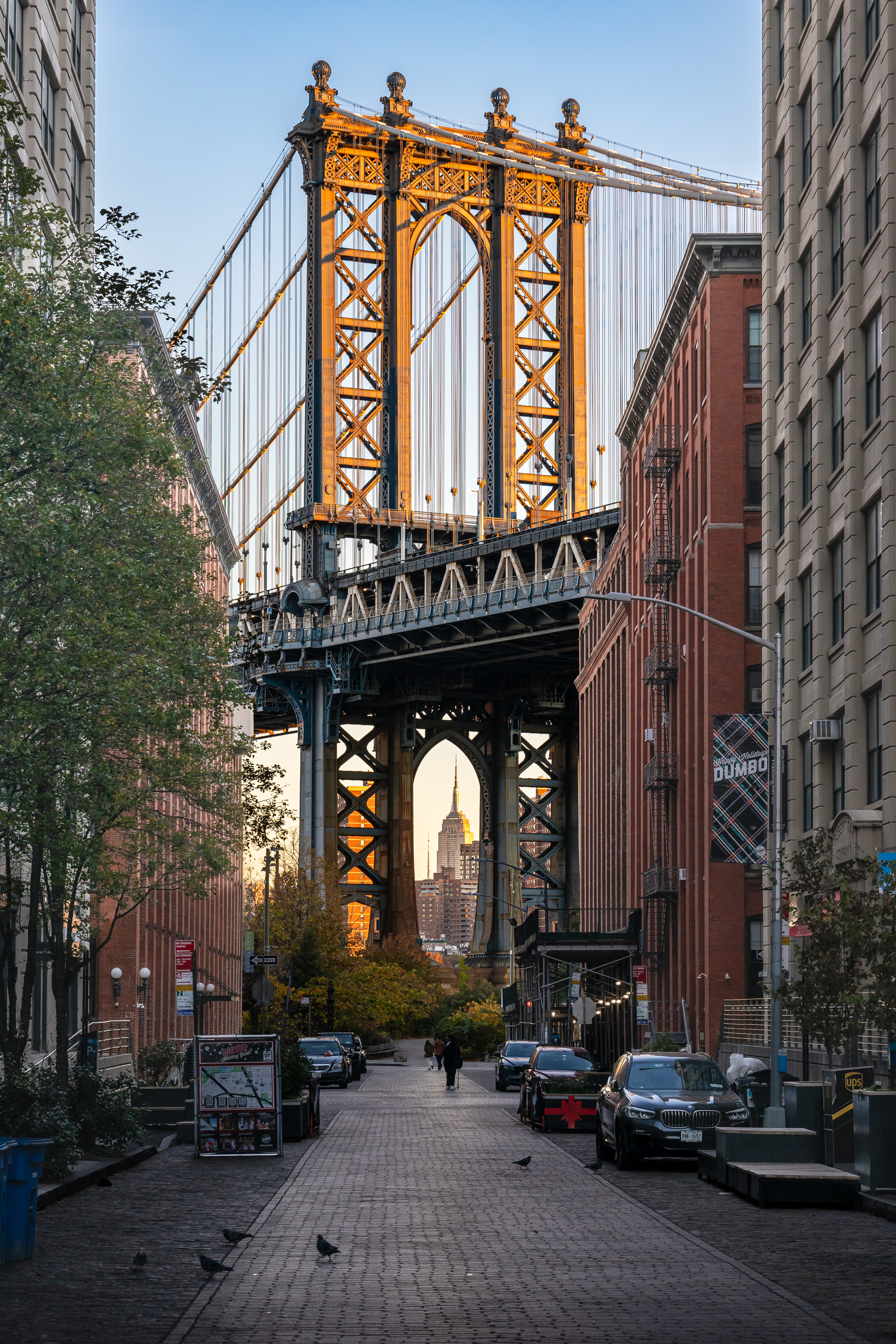
View from Washington Street, Brooklyn

The city's public works commissioner, Frederick H. Zurmuhlen, requested in early 1952 that the Board of Estimate hire David B. Steinman to thoroughly examine the Manhattan Bridge, saying its maintenance costs were disproportionately higher than those of the other East River bridges. A beam on the eastern side of the bridge cracked in April 1953 and was fixed within a month. Following the cracked-beam incident, Zurmuhlen asked the city to allocate $2.69 million to repair the bridge, as trains disproportionately used one side of the bridge, causing it to tilt. Two proposals were put forth for the bridge's subway tracks; one plan called for them to be moved to the center of the deck, while another plan called for the construction of an entirely new tunnel for subway trains. The administration of mayor Robert F. Wagner tentatively approved a $30 million renovation of the bridge in July 1954, and a committee of engineers was hired to review alternate proposals for the bridge. Zurmuhlen said the bridge's safety would be compromised within the next decade if subway trains continued to use the bridge.

By February 1955, the city had hired a contractor to repair the Manhattan Bridge's cable bands and hangers for $2.2 million. Before these repairs could begin, engineers surveyed the bridge. When work on the cables began in June, access to the western upper roadway was severely reduced. That September, the eastern upper roadway was closed for repairs; the western upper roadway was used by Manhattan-bound traffic during weekday mornings and carried two-way traffic at other times. The bridge was temporarily closed to all traffic in November 1955. The eastern upper roadway was again closed during the midday in early 1956 for suspender cable repairs, and the whole span was closed during nights in June 1956. All lanes were again open by that August. The city had still not decided whether to move the subway tracks to a double-deck structure in the middle of the bridge, even though that plan would have reduced strain on the cables. For unknown reasons, the tracks were never moved.

==== Other modifications ====
Plans for the Brooklyn–Queens Expressway in Brooklyn, which was constructed in the 1950s, included ramps to the Manhattan Bridge. Lane control lights were installed above the bridge's reversible lower-level lanes in early 1958, and fixed red and green lights were installed on the upper-level roadways. The same year, the city spent $50,000 on repairs after two boats collided on the East River, causing an explosion that scorched the bridge. The city announced in 1959 that it would rebuild the upper roadways to accommodate trucks. The Karl Koch Engineering Company received a contract to rebuild the upper roadways; the project was planned to cost $6.377 million. The eastern upper roadway was closed for repairs in September 1960; the project also included fixing the lower deck and building ramps from the Brooklyn-Queens Expressway. After the eastern upper roadway reopened in November 1961, the western upper roadway was closed, and the eastern upper roadway was temporarily used as a reversible lane. Work proceeded several months ahead of schedule.

In conjunction with the upgrades to the upper roadways, in June 1961, New York City parks commissioner Robert Moses proposed demolishing the plazas on both sides and connecting the bridge to new expressways. The bridge would have linked the Lower Manhattan Expressway with the Brooklyn-Queens Expressway, though the former was never built. The city's art commission delayed the demolition of the plazas before ruling that the pylons in the Brooklyn plaza be relocated to the Brooklyn Museum or another suitable location. Wagner said in late 1962 that he would request $2.9 million to rebuild the approaches at both ends of the bridge; the work included a widening of an approach road at the bridge's Manhattan end. The pylons flanking the Brooklyn approach were moved to the Brooklyn Museum in 1963. The western upper roadway was closed for repairs for a year beginning in August 1969. Two of the lower roadway's lanes were closed for four months starting in November 1970 so workers could replace faulty joints.

=== Late 20th- and early 21st-century renovation ===
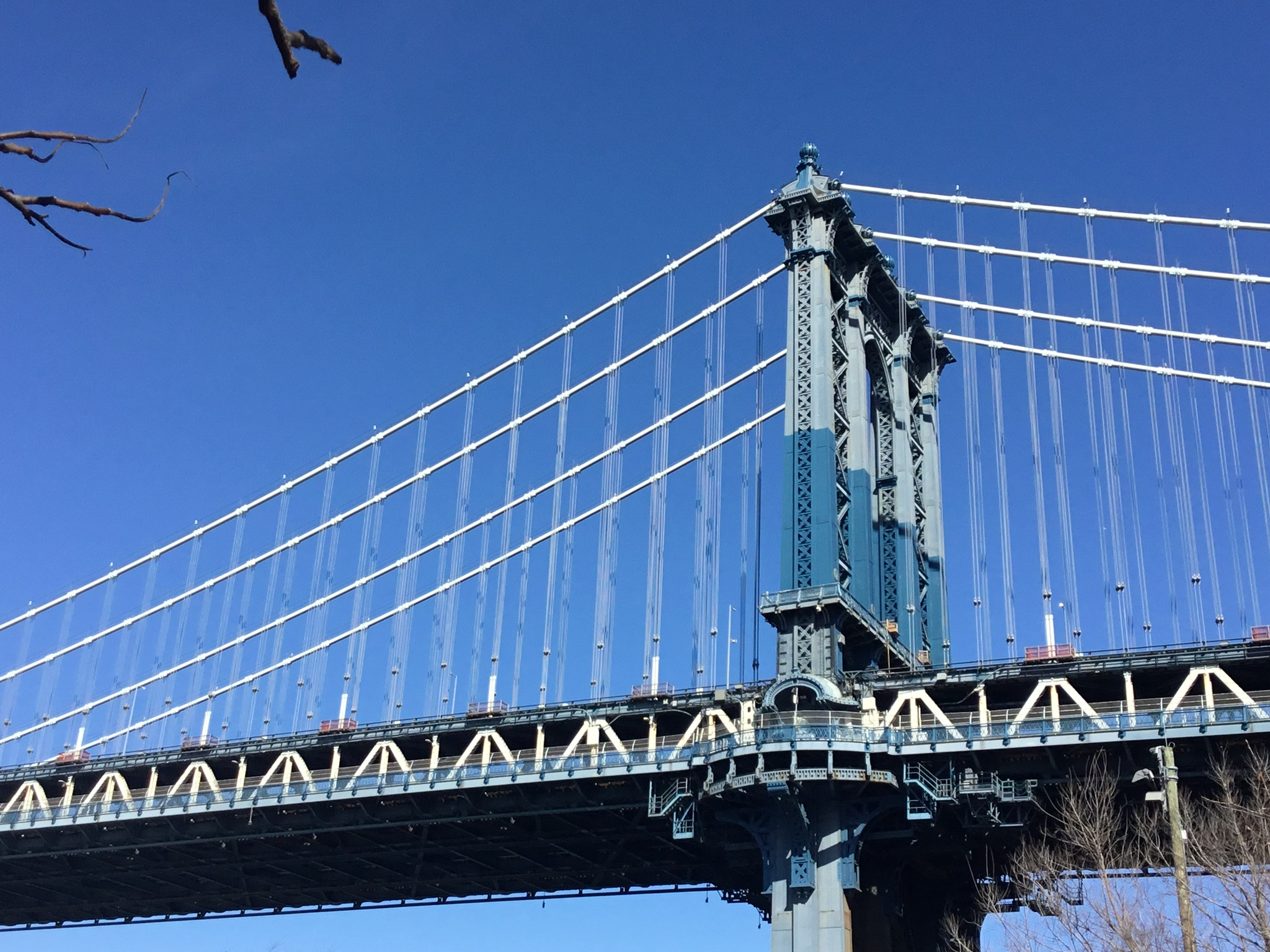
The deck and one of the towers as seen from ground level

The weight of the subway trains had caused deep and widespread cracks to form in the bridge's floor beams, prompting the city government to replace 300 deteriorated beams during the late 1970s. The deck twisted up to 8 feet (2.4 m) every time a train passed by, and trains had to slow down on the bridge. A New York Times reporter wrote that diagonal cable stays might eventually need to be installed; the city government also contemplated installing support towers under the side spans. The bridge's condition was blamed on the imbalance in the number of trains crossing the bridge, as well as deferred maintenance during the New York City fiscal crisis of the 1970s. In 1979, the New York state government took over control of the Queensboro, Williamsburg, Manhattan, and Brooklyn bridges. One engineer estimated in 1988 that the bridge would cost $162.6 million to repair.

==== Late 1970s and 1980s ====
The state government started inspecting the Manhattan Bridge and five others in 1978. The same year, the United States Congress voted to allocate money to repair the bridge, as well as several others in New York City. After the presidential administration of Ronald Reagan questioned whether the congressional funding should cover the subway tracks' restoration, the U.S. government agreed in 1981 to fund restoration both of the roadways and of the subway tracks. By the early 1980s, the New York City Department of Transportation (NYCDOT) planned to spend $100 million on bridge repairs. The New York City government allocated $10.1 million for preliminary work on the bridge in March 1982, and minor repair work started that year. Workers planned to install brackets and supports under the deck, and they drilled small holes into the lower-level floor beams in an unsuccessful attempt to prevent the beams from cracking further. An overhaul of the bridge began in April 1985, and the city received $60 million in federal funds for the renovations of the Queensboro, Manhattan, and Brooklyn bridges the same year. The north tracks were closed that August, reopening that November after an $8.1 million repair.

The eastern upper roadway was temporarily closed starting in April 1986, and all northbound traffic was shifted to the lower level, as part of a $45 million project to replace the roadway and its steel supports. The north tracks underneath were closed that month. The roadway was originally supposed to reopen within 15 months, but contractors found that one of the anchors for the main cables was far more corroded than anticipated, delaying the eastern roadway's reopening by another 18 months. The renovation of the Manhattan Bridge was behind schedule by the end of 1986, in part because of the corrosion. Legal issues, traffic reroutes, and concerns about the capabilities of the main contractor were also cited as causes for the delays in the renovation. Inspectors subsequently found that twenty of the girders below the lower deck had cracks as much as 15 inches (380 mm) wide. Due to the cracks on the lower level, in December 1987, inspectors shut one lane of the lower level and banned buses and trucks from the two remaining lower-level lanes. The city government agreed to pay $750,000 to fix the cracks.

In 1988, the NYCDOT published a list of 17 structurally deficient bridges in the city, including the Manhattan Bridge. That year, inspectors identified 73 "flags" or potentially serious defects, compared to the five defects identified in a 1978 inspection. As a result, the general contractor was ousted in August 1988, and the New York State Department of Transportation had to hire another contractor, increasing the project's cost. The eastern roadway of the Manhattan Bridge reopened in December 1988; the north tracks also reopened at that time, and the south tracks were closed. Although the NYCDOT had planned to halt work for 16 months, the western roadway was closed for emergency repairs in February 1989 after two corroded beams sagged. Newsday reported that the western roadway had urgently required repair for almost three years but had remained open to avoid shutting down all four of the bridge's subway tracks at once. The cables, trusses, and subway frame on the eastern half of the bridge had to be repaired, and the lower roadway needed complete replacement. After seven columns supporting the Brooklyn approach were found to be cracked or corroded, these columns were repaired in late 1989.

==== 1990s ====
By the end of 1990, engineers found that the bridge's support beams had thousands of cracks. Service on the south tracks resumed in December 1990, despite warnings the structure was unsafe; they had to be closed again after the discovery of corroded support beams and missing steel plates. The north-side tracks also had to be closed periodically to repair cracks. In the aftermath of the dispute, two city officials were fired, and the New York City Council's Transportation committee held inquiries on the reopening of the south tracks and the safety of all New York City bridges. They found that the NYCDOT and MTA's lack of cooperation contributed significantly to the deteriorating conditions. There were also allegations that the NYCDOT's transportation commissioner was not properly addressing concerns about the bridge's safety. Starting in January 1991, trucks and buses were banned from the lower roadway, which was also closed for repairs during nights and weekends. Meanwhile, the weight of heavy trucks created holes in the upper roadbed, so a three-ton weight limit was imposed.

The NYCDOT selected the Yonkers Contracting Company as the bridge's main contractor in early 1992, and the firm was awarded a $97.8 million contract that August. City Comptroller Elizabeth Holtzman originally denied the contract to the company because of concerns about corruption, but she was overridden by Mayor David Dinkins, who wanted to complete repairs quickly. The NYCDOT began conducting more frequent inspections of the bridge after inspectors found holes in beams that had been deemed structurally sound during previous inspections. A shantytown at the Manhattan end of the bridge became one of the city's largest homeless encampments before it was razed in 1993. The western upper roadway was closed for reconstruction that year. As part of an experiment, researchers from Mount Sinai Hospital monitored lead levels in Manhattan Bridge workers' blood while the reconstruction took place.

The bridge repairs were repeatedly delayed as the renovation process uncovered more serious structural problems underlying the bridge. The original plans had been to complete the renovations by 1995 for $150 million, but by 1996, the renovation was slated to be complete in 2003 at a cost of $452 million. The western upper roadway did not reopen until 1996.

==== 2000s ====
By 2001, it was estimated that the renovations had cost $500 million to date, including $260 million for the west side and another $175 million for the east side. At the time, the NYCDOT had set a January 2004 deadline for the renovation. The eastern upper roadway was closed for a renovation starting in 2002. The original pedestrian walkway on the west side of the bridge was reopened in June 2001, having been closed for 20 years. It was shared with bicycles until late summer 2004, when a dedicated bicycle path was opened on the east side of the bridge. The bike path was poorly signed, leading to cyclist and pedestrian conflicts. By the time work on the bridge was completed in 2004, the final cost of the renovation totaled $800 million. The lower-level roadway was then renovated between 2004 and 2008.

The arch and colonnade had also become deteriorated, having become covered with graffiti and dirt. The enclosed plaza within the colonnade had been used as a parking lot by the New York City Police Department, while the only remaining portion of the large park surrounding the arch and colonnade, at Canal and Forsyth Streets, had accumulated trees. The arch and colonnade themselves had open joints in the stonework, as well as weeds, bushes, and small trees growing at their top. The arch and colonnade were restored starting in the late 1990s, with the restoration being completed in April 2001 for $11 million. The project entailed cleaning the structures and installing 258 floodlights.

=== Late 2000s to present ===
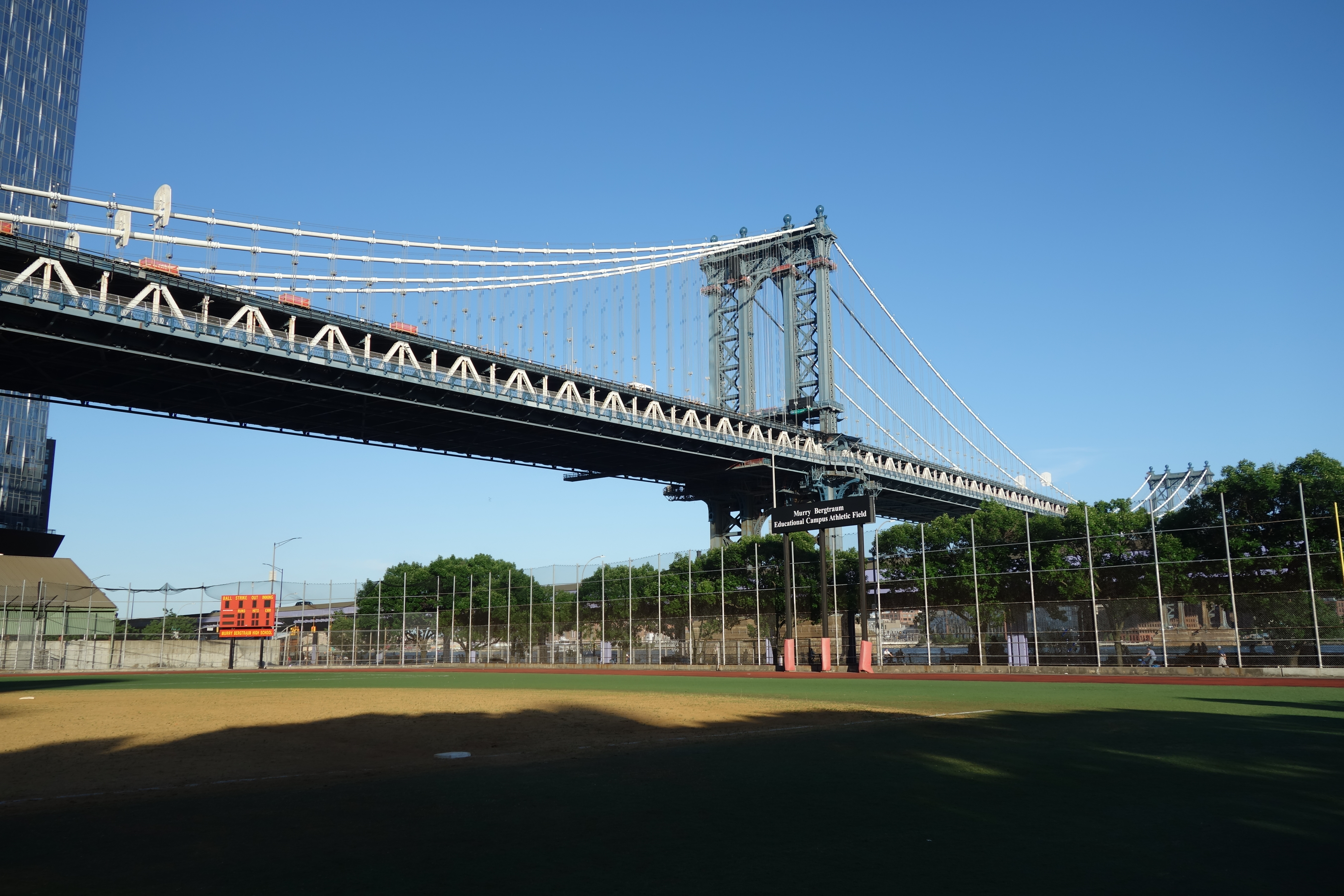
Manhattan Bridge, looking northeast from Murry Bergtraum High School Field in 2021

To celebrate the bridge's centennial, a series of events and exhibits were organized by the New York City Bridge Centennial Commission in October 2009. These included a ceremonial parade across the Manhattan Bridge on the morning of October 4 and a fireworks display in the evening. In 2009, the bridge was designated as a National Historic Civil Engineering Landmark by the American Society of Civil Engineers. An $834 million project to replace the Manhattan Bridge's suspension cables was announced in 2010. The work was scheduled to take two years.

The lower roadway was permanently reconfigured in July 2015 to carry traffic toward Manhattan only; prior to this change, the lower roadway carried traffic toward Brooklyn for six hours every afternoon. The same year, the NYCDOT began allowing Brooklyn-bound drivers to exit onto Concord Street in Brooklyn at all times; previously, drivers could only exit onto Concord Street during the afternoon rush hours. The Concord Street exit was again closed outside the afternoon rush hour in early 2016. After rubble was found in Brooklyn Bridge Park under the Brooklyn approach in 2018, Skanska was given a contract to repair parts of the bridge at a cost of $75.9 million. The renovation was scheduled to finish in early 2021. The work entailed replacing some fencing, installing some new steel beams on the spans, and refurbishing ornamental elements on the towers. For instance, the spherical finials atop the suspension towers were replaced with cast-iron copies. The National Transportation Safety Board recommended in early 2025 that the bridge undergo a structural vulnerability assessment, following the Francis Scott Key Bridge collapse in Maryland the previous year.

== Description ==
Cross section illustrating the bridge's lane layout, looking north

The bridge, including approaches but excluding plazas, is about 6,855 feet (2,089 m) long. The bridge reaches a maximum height of 134 ft (40.8 m) above mean high water at the middle of the river. The main span between the two suspension towers is 1,470 feet (450 m) long. (Note: One source gives an alternate measurement of 1,480 feet (450 m).) The side spans, between the anchorages and the suspension towers on either side, are 725 feet (221 m) long. When the bridge was built, the Manhattan approach and plaza were quoted as being 2,510 feet (770 m) long, while the Brooklyn approach and plaza were quoted as measuring 2,370 feet (720 m) long. The bridge's dead load is 25,000 pounds per square foot (120,000 kg/m^{2}), and its live load is 16,000 pounds per square foot (78,000 kg/m^{2}).

The bridge was designed by Leon Moisseiff. The plans for Manhattan Bridge are sometimes mistakenly attributed to Gustav Lindenthal, who was the city's bridge commissioner before he was fired in 1904. The steel was fabricated by the Phoenix Bridge Company.

=== Deck ===
The Manhattan Bridge has four vehicle lanes on the upper level, split between two roadways carrying opposite directions of traffic. The southbound roadway to Brooklyn is on the west side of the bridge, while the northbound roadway to Manhattan is on the east side. The lower level has three Manhattan-bound vehicle lanes (formerly reversible until 2015) and four rapid transit/subway tracks, two under each of the upper roadways. Also on the lower level are a walkway on the south (geographically facing west) and a bikeway on the north side (geographically facing east). Originally, there were four streetcar tracks above the four rapid transit tracks. Although both levels could theoretically have accommodated either streetcars or elevated rapid transit, subways could use only the lower level because subway trains would have needed to climb an excessively steep slope to reach the upper level.

The deck is 120 feet (37 m) wide. As designed, the lower-level roadway was 34 feet (10 m) or 35 feet (11 m) wide. The walkway and bikeway were each 10 feet (3.0 m) or 12 feet (3.7 m) wide. The Manhattan-bound (eastern) upper-level roadway is 24 feet (7.3 m) wide, while the Brooklyn-bound (western) roadway is 22.5 feet (6.9 m) wide; both roadways narrow to 19 feet (5.8 m) at the anchorages. At the Brooklyn end of the south pathway, a staircase leads to the intersection of Jay and High streets. Because the subway trains are on the outer edges of the deck, this causes torsional stresses every time a train crossed the bridge. As built, the bridge sagged by as much as 3 feet (0.91 m) when a train crossed it, and it took about 30 seconds for the deck to return to its normal position after a train had passed. The floor beams under the lower level are 37 inches (940 mm) thick.

The Manhattan Bridge was the first suspension bridge to employ Josef Melan's deflection theory for deck stiffening. The theory posited that the weight of a suspension bridge's deck, and the downward forces created by vehicles on the bridge, provided stability to the bridge's deck; thus, such a bridge could use lighter trusses. As such, the Manhattan Bridge was the first suspension bridge in the world to use a lightly-webbed weight-saving Warren truss. There are four stiffening trusses, two each flanking the tracks on the north and south sides of the bridge; these trusses measure 24 feet (7.3 m) or 26 feet (7.9 m) deep. Each of the trusses is directly beneath one of the main cables. The centerlines of the inner trusses are 40 feet (12 m) apart from each other, while the centerline of each of the outer trusses is spaced 28 feet (8.5 m) from the centerlines of the inner trusses. The bottom of each truss is connected to the steel beams under the lower level, while the top of each truss supports the upper-level roadways. The trusses distribute the bridge's weight between each vertical suspender cable.

=== Towers ===
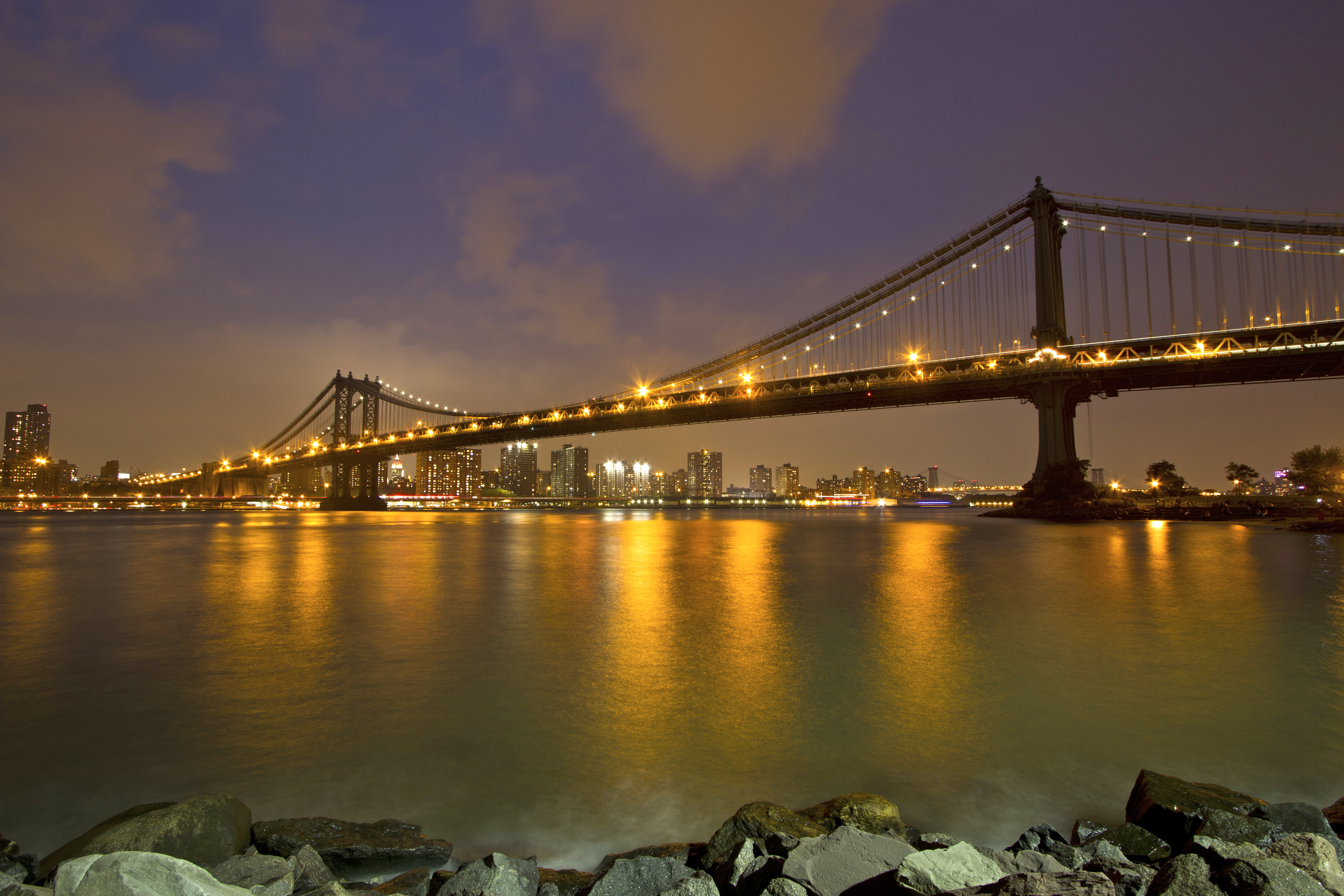
The Manhattan Bridge at night, seen from Brooklyn Bridge Park, 2012.

The Manhattan Bridge's suspension towers measure 330 feet (100 m) from the mean high water mark to the tops of the cables; the ornamental finials atop each tower are 350 feet (110 m) above high water. (Note: The Brooklyn Daily Eagle wrote in 1908 that the tops of the towers were 322.5 feet (98.3 m) high and that the finials were 340 feet (100 m) high. The New York City Landmarks Preservation Commission gives a height of 336 feet (102 m). One source gives a figure as low as 321 feet (98 m).) Each tower sits on a masonry pier that measures 68 by 134 feet (21 by 41 m) across and projects 23 feet (7.0 m) above mean high water. The tops of each pier taper to a steel pedestal measuring 18 by 43 feet (5.5 by 13.1 m), from which rise the columns of each tower. The foundations of each tower, consisting of the underwater section of each pier and a caisson below it, descend 92 feet (28 m) below mean high water. The caissons measure 78 by 144 feet (24 by 44 m) across. They have concrete walls and contained a working chamber divided into three compartments.

Each tower is made of 6,500 short tons (5,800 long tons; 5,900 t) of steel, much heavier than the towers of similar suspension bridges. The towers are composed of four columns oriented transversely (perpendicularly) to the deck, one each flanking the north and south roadways. The columns measure 5 feet (1.5 m) wide, as measured transversely. The length of each column, as measured laterally, tapers from 32 feet (9.8 m) at the pedestal to 10 feet (3.0 m) at the top. The columns are braced by diagonal steel beams. A publication from 1904 wrote that the central parts of each tower were designed like a "great open arch", making it possible to rebuild either the western or eastern halves of the bridge without affecting the structural integrity of the other half.

The towers contain little decorative detail, except for spherical finials. Each suspension tower contains an iron and copper hood over the pedestrian or bike path on either side, as well as iron cornices just below the tops of the towers. Saddles carry the main cables above the tops of each suspension tower. Each saddle weighs 15 short tons (13 long tons; 14 t). In contrast to the Williamsburg and Brooklyn bridges (where the saddles are placed on movable rollers), the saddles are fixed in place, as the towers themselves were intended to flex slightly to accommodate the strains placed on each cable. If the bridge was loaded to full capacity, the tops of the towers could bend up to 25 inches (640 mm) toward the center of the river. The steel beams also expanded by up to 0.75 inches (19 mm) just sitting in the sun.

=== Cables ===
The Manhattan Bridge contains four main cables, which measure 3,224 ft (983 m) long. They descend from the tops of the suspension towers and help support the deck. The cables weigh a combined 6,000 short tons (5,400 long tons; 5,400 t) and can carry 110,000 short tons (98,000 long tons; 100,000 t) including the weight of the cables themselves. The cables measure either 20.75 inches (527 mm), 21 inches (533 mm), or 21.25 inches (540 mm) in diameter. Unlike the Williamsburg Bridge (but like other suspension bridges), the wires on the Manhattan Bridge's cables are galvanized to prevent rusting. Each cable consists of 9,472 parallel wires, (Note: This is incorrectly cited in one New-York Tribune article as 4,972 wires. Another article from the same newspaper gives a calculation of 37 strands, each with 256 wires, for a total of 9,472 wires. Other sources corroborate the 9,472-wire figure.) which are grouped into 37 strands of 256 wires. The wires measure 3/16 inch (4.8 mm) across. The cables themselves are capable of resisting loads of up to 30,000 short tons (27,000 long tons; 27,000 t).

There are 1,400 vertical suspender cables, which hang from the main cables and hold up the deck. They measure about 5 inches (130 mm) in diameter and weigh a total of 8,000 short tons (7,100 long tons; 7,300 t). Each suspender can withstand up to 100 short tons per square inch (14 t/cm^{2}) of pressure. There are cable bands at the top of each suspender cable (where they attach to the main cable); the suspenders are attached to the main cables using clamps. The lower parts of the suspender cables pass through the trusses. To reduce chafing on the lower parts of the suspender cables, workers installed wooden buffers between the suspender cables and the trusses after the bridge was completed.

=== Anchorages ===
The cables are attached to stone anchorages on each side, measuring 237 feet (72 m) long, 182 feet (55 m) wide, and 135 feet (41 m) tall. Each anchorage weighs 233,000 short tons (208,000 long tons; 211,000 t) and is filled with 115,000 cubic feet (3,300 m^{3}) of concrete and rubble masonry. Inside the anchorages are 36 anchor bars, nine for each cable. The ends of each strand are attached to the anchor bars, which in turn are attached to eyebars measuring 110 feet (34 m) long. There are 37 eyebars connecting each cable to the anchor bars, distributing the loads on the cables across a larger area.

The anchorages were intentionally wider than the deck, providing space for pedestrians to rest; these pedestrian areas are 120 feet (37 m) above the ground. The facade of each anchorage is made of concrete and is topped by a colonnade measuring 40 feet (12 m) long. Each colonnade is divided vertically into five bays. The arches and colonnades are the only decorative elements of each anchorage. Early proposals for the anchorages called for them to include auditoriums, but this proposal was never executed. In a 1909 article for the Architectural Record, architectural critic Montgomery Schuyler described the anchorages as having "an aspect of Egyptian immobility", and another author in 2006 similarly compared the anchorages to "vast, battered, Egyptian masses".

At the base of the Manhattan anchorage is an arch measuring 46 feet (14 m) wide and 46 feet tall, through which Cherry Street passes. Water Street passes through a similar arch in Brooklyn. The intersection of Adams and Water streets had to be relocated to make way for the Brooklyn anchorage. The archway under the Brooklyn anchorage contains a 7,000-square-foot (650 m^{2}) public plaza. The sides of the anchorages have large buttresses that slope upward.

=== Approach plazas ===
Carrère and Hastings designed approach plazas on both ends of the bridge. At the time of the bridge's opening, these plazas were meant to conceal views of the Manhattan Bridge from the streets on either end. The Manhattan plaza connects directly with Canal Street and the Bowery, while the Brooklyn end of the bridge continues as Flatbush Avenue (which in turn intersects several other roads at Prospect Park). The city paid Carl Augustus Heber, Charles Cary Rumsey, and Daniel Chester French a combined $41,000 (equivalent to $1,213,000 in 2025) to design sculptures around the approach plazas.

==== Manhattan plaza ====
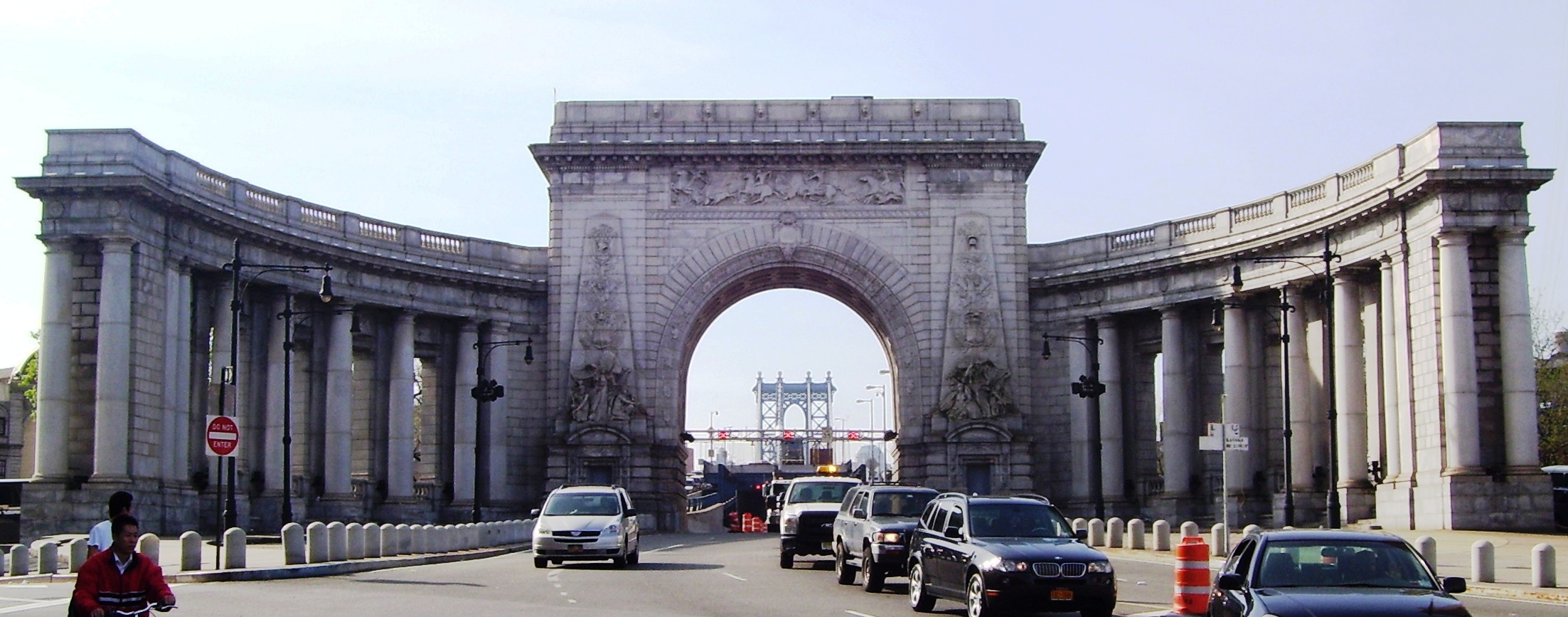
The Beaux Arts triumphal arch and colonnade at the Manhattan entrance

In Manhattan, the bridge terminates at a plaza originally bounded by the Bowery and Bayard, Division, Forsyth, and Canal streets. This plot covered 400 by 750 feet (120 by 230 m). The arch and colonnade were completed within this plaza in 1915; they surround an elliptical plaza facing northwest toward the Bowery.

===== Design =====
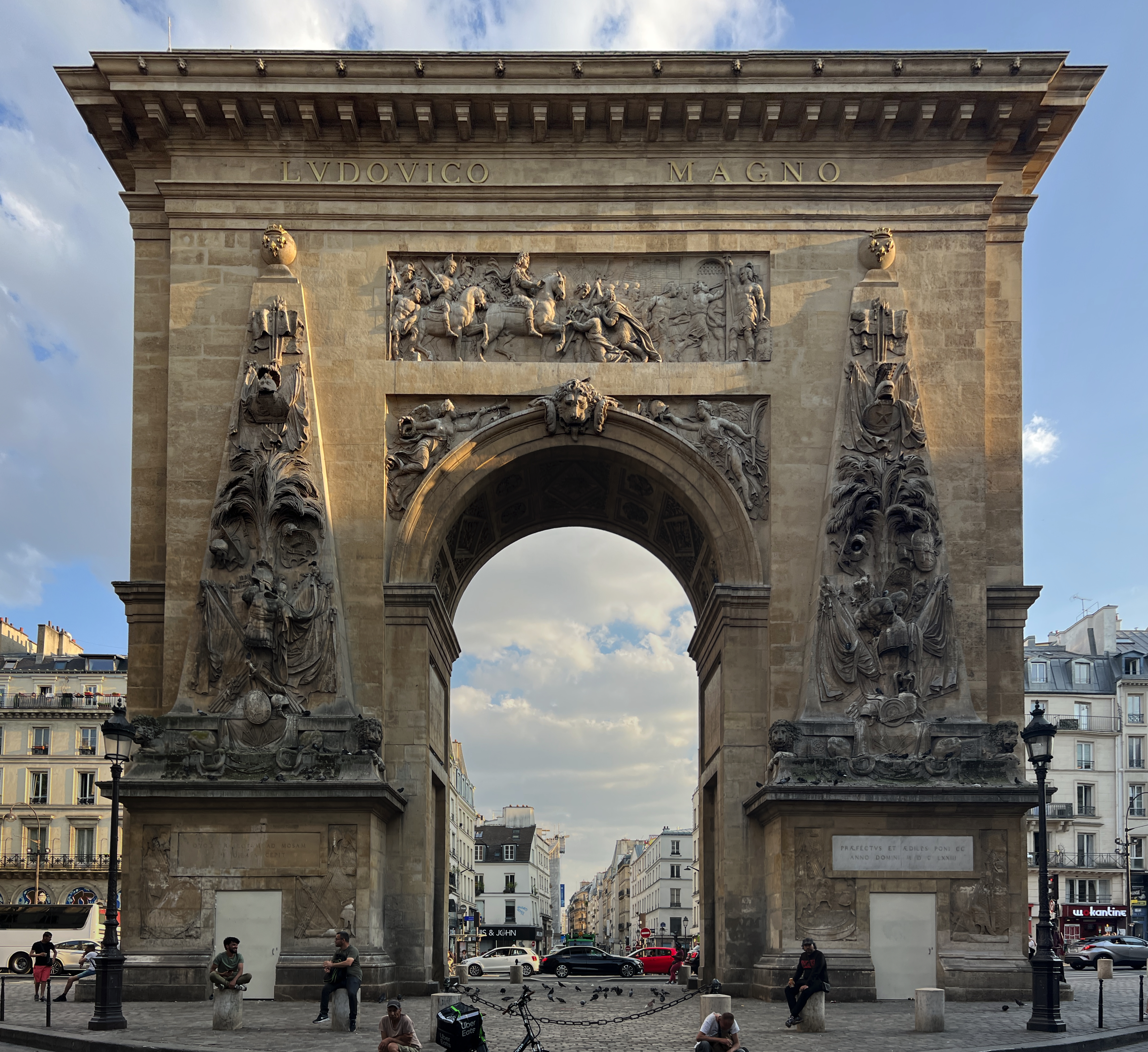
Porte Saint Denis in Paris

Colonnade of St. Peter's Square in the Vatican

The arch and colonnade are made of white, fine-grained Hallowell granite. They are decorated with two groups of allegorical sculptures by Heber and a frieze called "Buffalo Hunt" by Rumsey. The design of the arch and colonnade reference the fact that the Manhattan Bridge continues into Brooklyn as Flatbush Avenue, which runs south to the Atlantic Ocean. The arch thus signified the Manhattan Bridge's role as an ocean "gateway". The plaza was influenced by the New York Improvement Plan of 1907, which sought to create plazas and other open spaces at large intersections; a massive circular plaza, connecting the Brooklyn and Manhattan bridges, was never built.

The arch was based on Paris's Porte Saint-Denis. It is one of the city's three remaining triumphal arches, the others being the Washington Square Arch and the Soldiers' and Sailors' Arch. The arch's opening measures 36 feet (11 m) high and 40 feet (12 m) wide. On the northern side of the arch, the opening is flanked by carvings of classical ships, masks, shields, and oak leaves. The western pier contains the sculptural group Spirit of Commerce, depicting a winged woman flanked by two figures. The eastern pier contains Spirit of Industry, depicting the god Mercury flanked by two figures. The arch's keystone contains a depiction of a bison. Above is the "Buffalo Hunt" frieze, which depicts Native Americans hunting animals while on horseback. The relief is topped by dentils and egg-and-dart ornamentation. The cornice of the arch contains modillions as well as six lion heads. The interior of the arch contains a coffered ceiling. There are rosettes on the arch's soffit. The southern side of the arch, facing Brooklyn, is less ornately decorated but has rusticated stone blocks indicative of a Parisian or Florentine bank. On the southern side, there are decorations of carved lions at the bases of each pier.

The colonnade and plaza was modeled after the one surrounding St. Peter's Square in Vatican City. The colonnade is elliptical and rises to 38 feet (12 m). It is supported by six pairs of 31-foot (9.4 m) Tuscan columns on either side, with each pair of columns flanking rusticated piers inside the colonnade. Above each column is a stone with a classical motif, such as a boat or a cuirass. There is an entablature above the columns, as well as a cornice and balustrade at the top of the colonnade. The entablature contains roundels with floral motifs. The arch and colonnade were initially surrounded by granite retaining walls that contained decorative balustrades surrounding parkland on either side of the arch and colonnade. Only a small segment of parkland remains at Canal and Forsyth streets, while the south side of the park became Confucius Plaza.

===== Reception and modifications =====
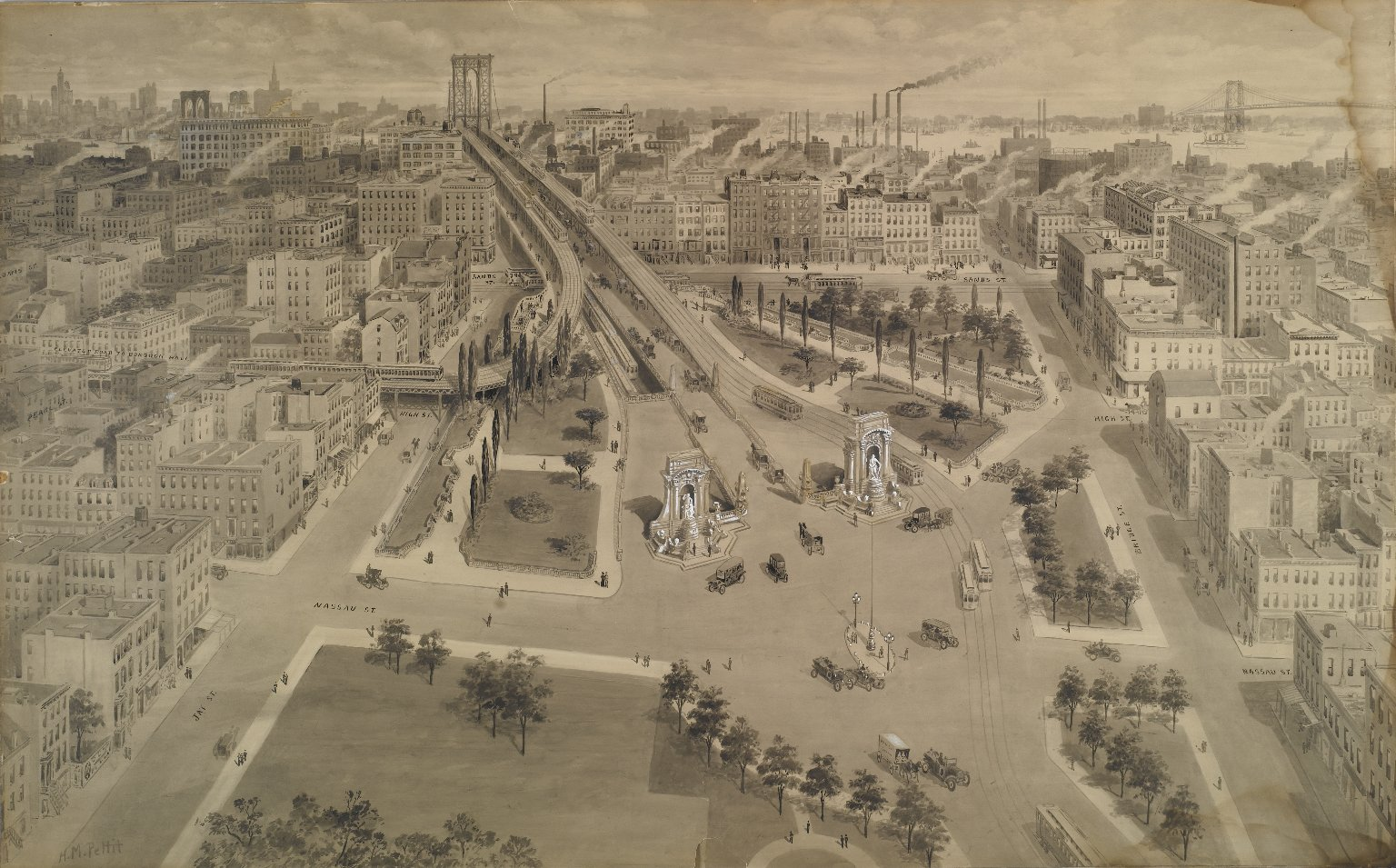
The Brooklyn Plaza of the bridge c.1917. Nassau Street is across the foreground. The Brooklyn Bridge is visible in the left background, and the Williamsburg Bridge in the right background.

American Architect and Architecture described the arch and colonnade in 1912 as "worthy of one of the principal gateways of a great modern city". The arch and colonnade were described as a "complete, dignified and monumental ensemble, worthy of one of the principal gateways of a great modern city" in a New York Times article. The Brooklyn Daily Eagle wrote: "The Manhattan Bridge will be not only something to get across the East River upon, but the sight of it will be a joy even to those who have no occasion to cross it." According to The Christian Science Monitor, the plaza's presence "has turned a section of the East Side, in one of its most squalid parts, into a veritable park where children can find on summer evenings a clean open place amid surroundings that will be in many ways the equal of any in New York".

From the bridge's completion, the arch was heavily used by vehicular traffic. When the second Madison Square Garden was being demolished in 1925, there was a proposal to relocate the arena's statue of Diana to the arch, but this did not happen. Part of the colonnade's eastern arm was removed and replaced in the 1970s for the construction of the incomplete Second Avenue Subway. The arch and colonnade were designated a New York City landmark on November 25, 1975. After many years of neglect and several attempts by traffic engineers to remove the structure (including a proposal for the unbuilt Lower Manhattan Expressway that would have required removing the arch), the arch and colonnade were repaired and restored in 2000.

==== Brooklyn plaza ====
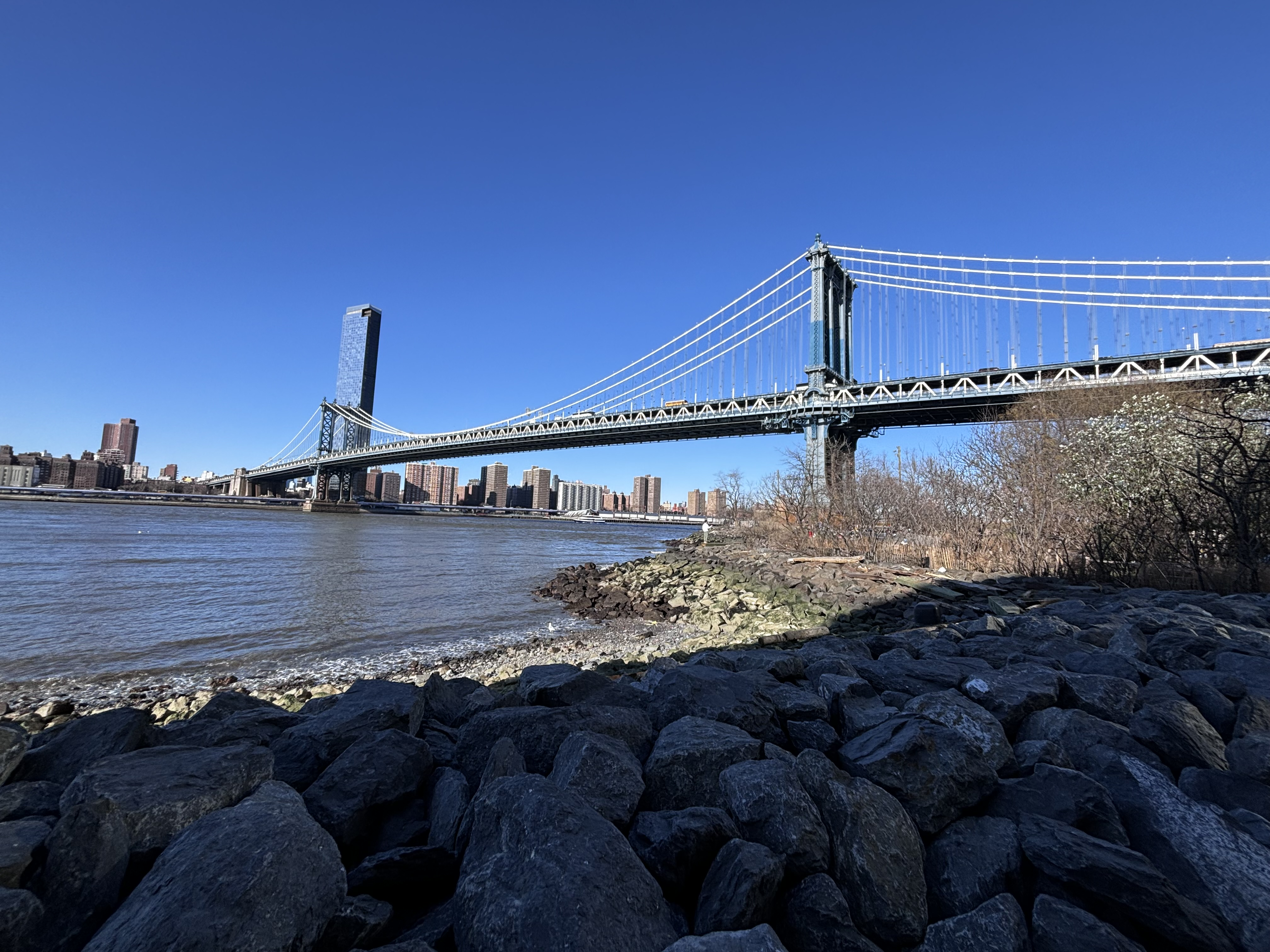
The Manhattan Bridge viewed from Brooklyn

The Brooklyn approach to the Manhattan Bridge also contained a terraced plaza with balustrades. The Brooklyn plaza was originally bounded by Sands, Bridge, Nassau, and Jay streets. French designed a pair of 20-short-ton (18-long-ton; 18 t) pylons named Brooklyn and Manhattan on the Brooklyn side of the Manhattan Bridge. These were installed in November 1916. Each pylon measured 12 feet (3.7 m) high and rested on a base 15 feet (4.6 m) off the ground. The statues on each pylon represented French's impressions of life in each borough. The Brooklyn pylon depicted a young woman with a child and symbols of art and progress, while the Manhattan pylon depicted a seated, upright woman with symbols of art and prosperity. There were granite railings and walkways at the base of either pylon.

A bas-relief memorializing former mayor William Jay Gaynor was dedicated at the bridge's Brooklyn plaza in 1927; it was relocated in 1939 to the nearby Brooklyn Bridge Plaza. The pylons were relocated to the Brooklyn Museum in 1963. The pylons never constituted a true portal, even when they were in place. Following their removal, the Brooklyn approach did not contain a formal entrance.

=== Exit list ===
Access to the Manhattan Bridge is provided by a series of ramps on both the Manhattan and Brooklyn sides of the river. All exits are unnumbered.

Borough	Location	mi	km	Destinations	Notes
Brooklyn	Brooklyn Heights	0.0	0.0	Flatbush Avenue Extension	Continuation south
Brooklyn	Brooklyn Heights	0.1	0.16	Nassau Street	Southbound Upper Level exit and northbound Upper Level entrance
Brooklyn	Brooklyn Heights	0.2	0.32	I-278 east (Brooklyn–Queens Expressway) – RFK Bridge	Southbound Upper Level exit and northbound Upper Level entrance
East River		0.4– 1.0	0.64– 1.6	Suspension span	
Manhattan	Chinatown	1.3	2.1	Bowery	Slip ramp from Bowery north to northbound Upper Level
Manhattan	Chinatown	1.4	2.3	Bowery / Canal Street to FDR Drive – Holland Tunnel	Continuation of northbound Lower Level
Manhattan	Chinatown	1.4	2.3	Chrystie Street to FDR Drive / Canal Street west – Holland Tunnel	Continuation of northbound Upper Level
1.000 mi = 1.609 km; 1.000 km = 0.621 mi: Incomplete access

=== Proposed I-478 designation ===
As early as the 1940s, there had been plans for an expressway running across Manhattan, connecting with the bridge. As part of the Interstate Highway System, the I-478 route number was proposed in 1958 for a branch of the Lower Manhattan Expressway running along the Manhattan Bridge. This highway would have run between I-78 (which would have split to another branch that used the Williamsburg Bridge) and I-278. The state government solicited bids for a ramp connecting the expressway to the bridge's Manhattan end in 1965. The Lower Manhattan Expressway project was canceled in March 1971, and the I-478 designation was applied to the Brooklyn–Battery Tunnel. A fragment of the never-built expressway's onramp still exists above the Manhattan side of the bridge's center roadway.

== Public transportation ==
The bridge was originally intended to carry four Brooklyn Rapid Transit Company (BRT; later Brooklyn–Manhattan Transit Corporation or BMT) subway tracks on the lower level, as well as four trolley tracks on the upper level. The trolley tracks were carried around the Manhattan side's colonnade, while the subway tracks did not emerge from street level until south of the colonnade.

=== Streetcar and bus service ===
Before the bridge opened, the BRT and the Coney Island and Brooklyn Rail Road (CI&B) both submitted bids to run streetcar service on the bridge, as did the Triborough Railroad Company. The Manhattan Bridge Three Cent Line received a permit to operate across the bridge in July 1910, despite opposition from the BRT and CI&B. The Three Cent Line still had not begun operating by 1911, when another firm, the Manhattan Bridge Service Company, applied for a franchise to operate streetcars across the bridge. After a subcommittee of the Board of Estimate recommended that the Brooklyn and North River Line receive a franchise, both the Three Cent Line and the Brooklyn and North River Line received franchises to operate across the bridge in mid-1912.

Due to disputes over the franchises, the Three Cent Line did not run across the bridge until September 1912; it carried passengers between either of the bridge's terminals. The Brooklyn and North River Line began operating in December 1915, and a bus route started running across the bridge after the Brooklyn and North River Railroad Company stopped operating streetcars across the bridge in October 1919. The Three Cent Line trolley was discontinued in November 1929 and replaced by a bus. A tour bus service, Culture Bus Loop II, began running across the bridge in 1973 and was discontinued in 1982. The B51 bus began running across the bridge in 1985 as part of a pilot program; the route was discontinued in 2010. As of 2024, no MTA Regional Bus Operations routes use the bridge.

=== Subway service ===
Four subway tracks are located on the lower deck of the bridge, two on each side of the lower roadway. The two tracks on the west side of the bridge (known as the south tracks) are used by the Q train at all times and the N train at all times except late nights, when it uses the Montague Street Tunnel. The tracks on the east side (known as the north tracks) are used by the D train at all times and the B train on weekdays. For both pairs of tracks, the western track carries southbound trains, and the eastern track carries northbound trains. On the Manhattan side, the south tracks connect to Canal Street and become the express tracks of the BMT Broadway Line, while the north tracks connect to the Chrystie Street Connection through Grand Street and become the express tracks on the IND Sixth Avenue Line. On the Brooklyn side, the two pairs merge under Flatbush Avenue to a large junction with the BMT Fourth Avenue Line and BMT Brighton Line at DeKalb Avenue.

In Brooklyn, the tracks have always connected to the BMT Fourth Avenue Line and the BMT Brighton Line; the junction between the lines was reconstructed in the 1950s. On the Manhattan side, the two north tracks originally connected to the BMT Broadway Line (where the south tracks now connect) while the two south tracks curved south to join the BMT Nassau Street Line towards Chambers Street. As a result of the Chrystie Street Connection, which linked the north tracks to the Sixth Avenue Line upon completion in 1967, the Nassau Street connection was severed. There were also unbuilt plans in the 1960s to have Long Island Rail Road trains use the subway tracks.

==== Trackage history ====
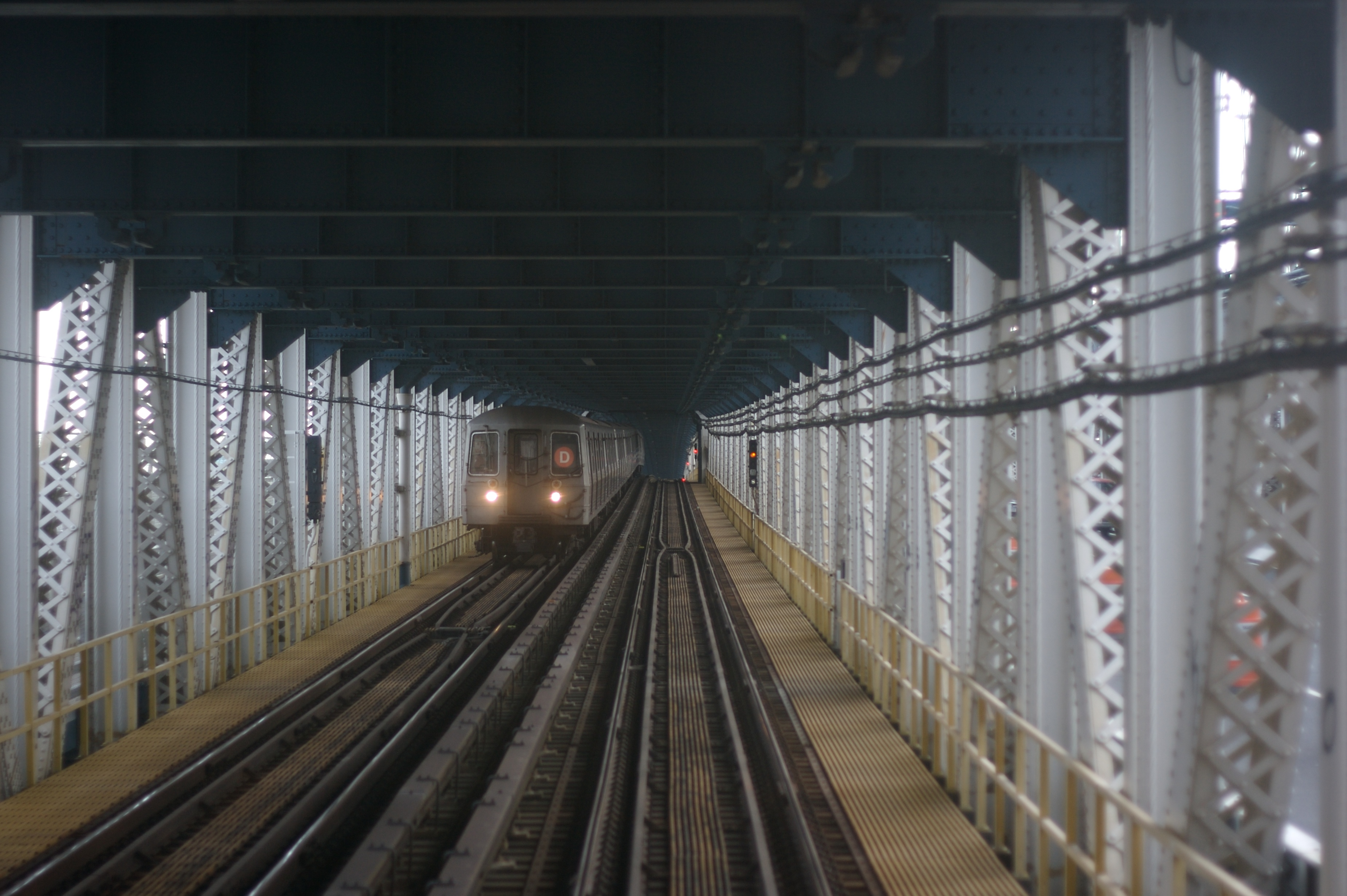
A Manhattan-bound D train of R68 cars crosses the bridge on the north tracks

The New York City Rapid Transit Commission recommended the construction of a subway line across the Manhattan Bridge in 1905, and this line was approved in 1907 as part of the Nassau Street Loop. Unsuccessful proposals for rapid transit across the bridge included a two-track line for the Interborough Rapid Transit Company and a two-track extension of a four-track BRT elevated line. The New York City Public Service Commission requested permission to start constructing the subway tracks in March 1909. Amid financial difficulties, and uncertainty over what subway lines would connect to the bridge in Brooklyn, the subway tracks were approved in May 1909. The subway tracks on the Manhattan Bridge opened on June 22, 1915, along with the Fourth Avenue Line and the Sea Beach Line. Initially, the north tracks carried trains to Midtown Manhattan via the Broadway Line, while the south tracks carried Sea Beach trains that terminated at Chambers Street.

When the Nassau Street Loop was completed on May 29, 1931, service on the south tracks declined, and traffic disproportionately used the north tracks. Trains from the Sea Beach, Brighton, and West End lines used the north tracks, while the south tracks were used only by short-turning trains from the West End and Culver lines. Approximately three times as many trains were using the north tracks than the south tracks by 1953, and 92 percent of subway trains used the north tracks by 1956. The Chrystie Street Connection opened on November 26, 1967, with a connection to the north tracks; the south tracks were rerouted to the Broadway Line, while the Nassau Line was disconnected from the bridge.

Repairs to the tracks commenced in August 1983, requiring closures of some subway tracks for three months. Further repairs occurred in 1985. The north tracks were closed for a longer-term repair in April 1986. The north tracks were reopened and the south tracks were closed simultaneously in December 1988. A projection for a reopening date was initially made for 1995. That year, the north tracks were closed during off-peak hours for six months. The south tracks finally reopened on July 22, 2001, whereby the north tracks were again closed. The south tracks was closed on weekends from April to November 2003. On February 22, 2004, the north tracks were reopened.

==== Tracks used ====
1967–1986

Service	Time period/ Tracks used		
Service	Weekdays	Weekends	Late nights
"B" train	north		no service
"B" express train	north	no service	
"D" train	north		
"N" train	south		no service
/	south	no service	

1986–1988: North tracks closed

Service	Time period/ Tracks used		
Service	Weekdays	Weekends	Late nights
B (New York City Subway service)	south		no service
D (New York City Subway service)	south		
"N" train	no service	south	
"Q" train	south	no service	

1988–2001: South tracks closed

Service	Time period/ Tracks used		
Service	Weekdays	Weekends	Late nights
"B" train	north		no service
"D" train	north		
Q (New York City Subway service)	north	no service	

2001–2004: North tracks closed

Service	Time period/ Tracks used		
Service	Weekdays	Weekends	Late nights
"Q" train	south		
"Q" express train	south	no service	
"W" train	south		no service

2013–2014: Montague Street Tunnel closed

Service	Time period/ Tracks used		
Service	Weekdays	Weekends	Late nights
"B" train	north	no service	
"D" train	north		
"N" train	south		
"Q" train	south		
"R" train	no service	south	no service

2004–2013, 2014-present

Service	Time period/ Tracks used		
Service	Weekdays	Weekends	Late nights
"B" train	north	no service	
"D" train	north		
"N" train	south		no service
"Q" train	south		

== Tolls ==
Initially, motorists had to pay a ten-cent toll, the same as the toll on the Brooklyn Bridge. Shortly after the Manhattan Bridge opened, the city government conducted a study and found that it had no authority to charge tolls on the Manhattan and Queensboro bridges. Tolls on the Manhattan Bridge, as well as the Queensboro, Williamsburg, and Brooklyn bridges, were abolished in July 1911 as part of a populist policy initiative headed by New York City mayor William Jay Gaynor.

In 1970, the federal government enacted the Clean Air Act, a series of federal air pollution regulations. As part of a plan by mayor John Lindsay and the federal Environmental Protection Agency, the city government considered implementing tolls on the four East River bridges, including the Manhattan Bridge, in the early 1970s. The plan would have raised money for New York City's transit system and allowed the city to meet the Clean Air Act. Abraham Beame, who became mayor in 1974, refused to implement the tolls, and the United States Congress subsequently moved to forbid tolls on the East River bridges. The United States Department of Transportation determined that the eastern upper roadway of the Manhattan Bridge was partially built with federal funds and, under federal law, could not be tolled.

A plan for congestion pricing in New York City was approved in mid-2023, allowing the Metropolitan Transportation Authority to toll drivers who enter Manhattan south of 60th Street. Congestion pricing was implemented in January 2025; all Manhattan-bound drivers pay a toll after using the bridge, which varies based on the time of day. Although no toll is charged upon exiting the congestion zone, all Brooklyn-bound drivers must pay a toll to access streets leading to the bridge.

== Impact ==
When the Manhattan Bridge was being developed, the Brooklyn Standard Union described it as "of greater capacity than either the Williamsburg or Brooklyn bridges, yet lighter and more artistic". The Brooklyn Daily Eagle predicted that the bridge's completion would spur the redevelopment of residential areas in Downtown Brooklyn, and the New-York Tribune said that warehouses would be developed in Lower Manhattan when the Manhattan Bridge opened. The bridge's opening significantly reduced patronage on several ferry lines that had traveled between Lower Manhattan and Downtown Brooklyn.

One local civic group predicted that large numbers of Jewish residents would move from Manhattan's Lower East Side to Brooklyn as a result of the bridge's opening. These included numerous Jewish families displaced by the bridge's construction. In addition, numerous industrial and factory buildings were built around the bridge's Brooklyn approach in the 1910s. Some of the land under the bridge's approaches was leased out; for example, a Chinese theater was built under the Manhattan approach in the 1940s, and a shopping mall was built there in the 1980s. The area under the Brooklyn approach became known as Dumbo, short for "Down Under the Manhattan Bridge Overpass", in the late 20th century and became an upscale residential neighborhood by the 2010s.

In the two decades following the Manhattan Bridge's completion, few bridges with longer spans were constructed. Nonetheless, the use of the deflection theory enabled the construction of longer suspension bridges in the early 20th century. Two of the world's largest suspension bridge spans built in the 1930s, the Golden Gate Bridge and the George Washington Bridge, incorporated deflection theory into their designs.

The bridge was the subject of American artist Edward Hopper's 1928 painting Manhattan Bridge Loop.

== Gallery ==
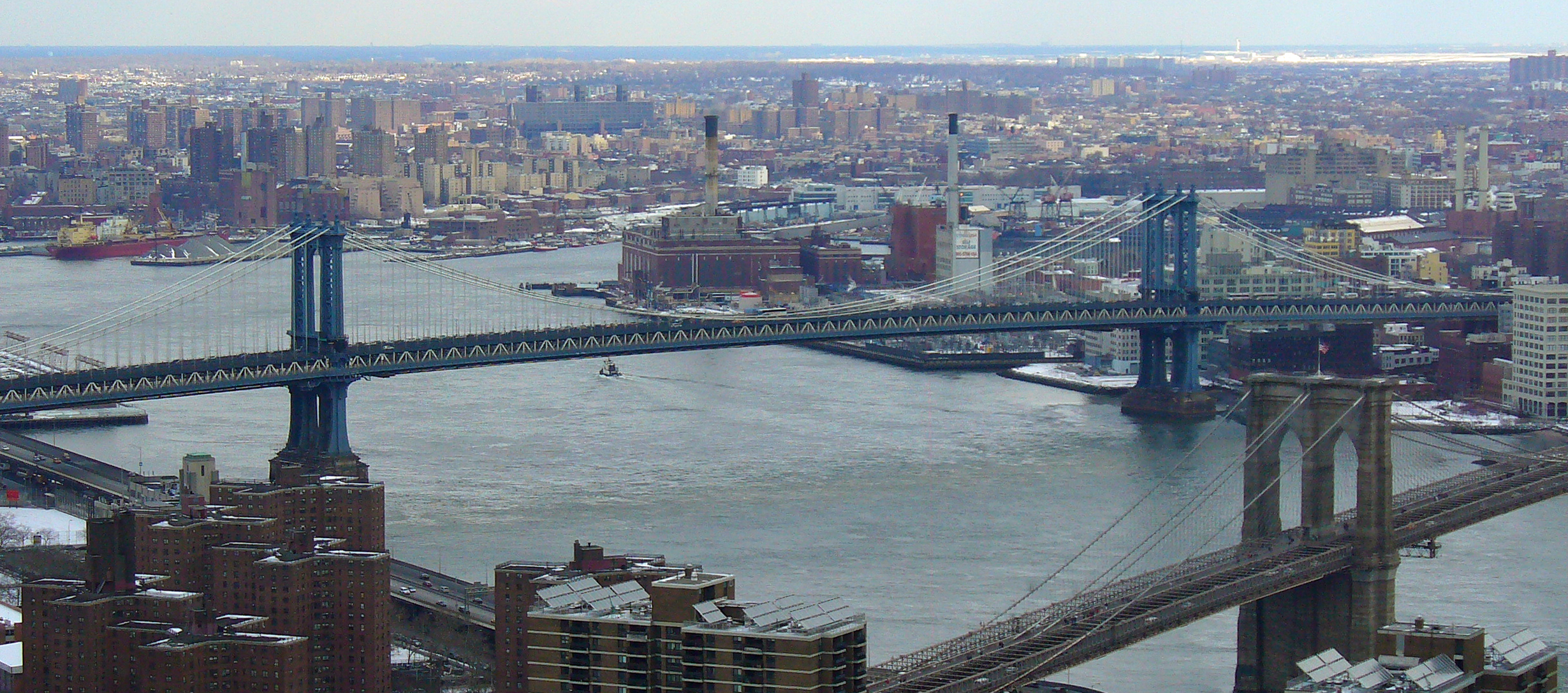
The full span, with the Brooklyn Bridge in the foreground
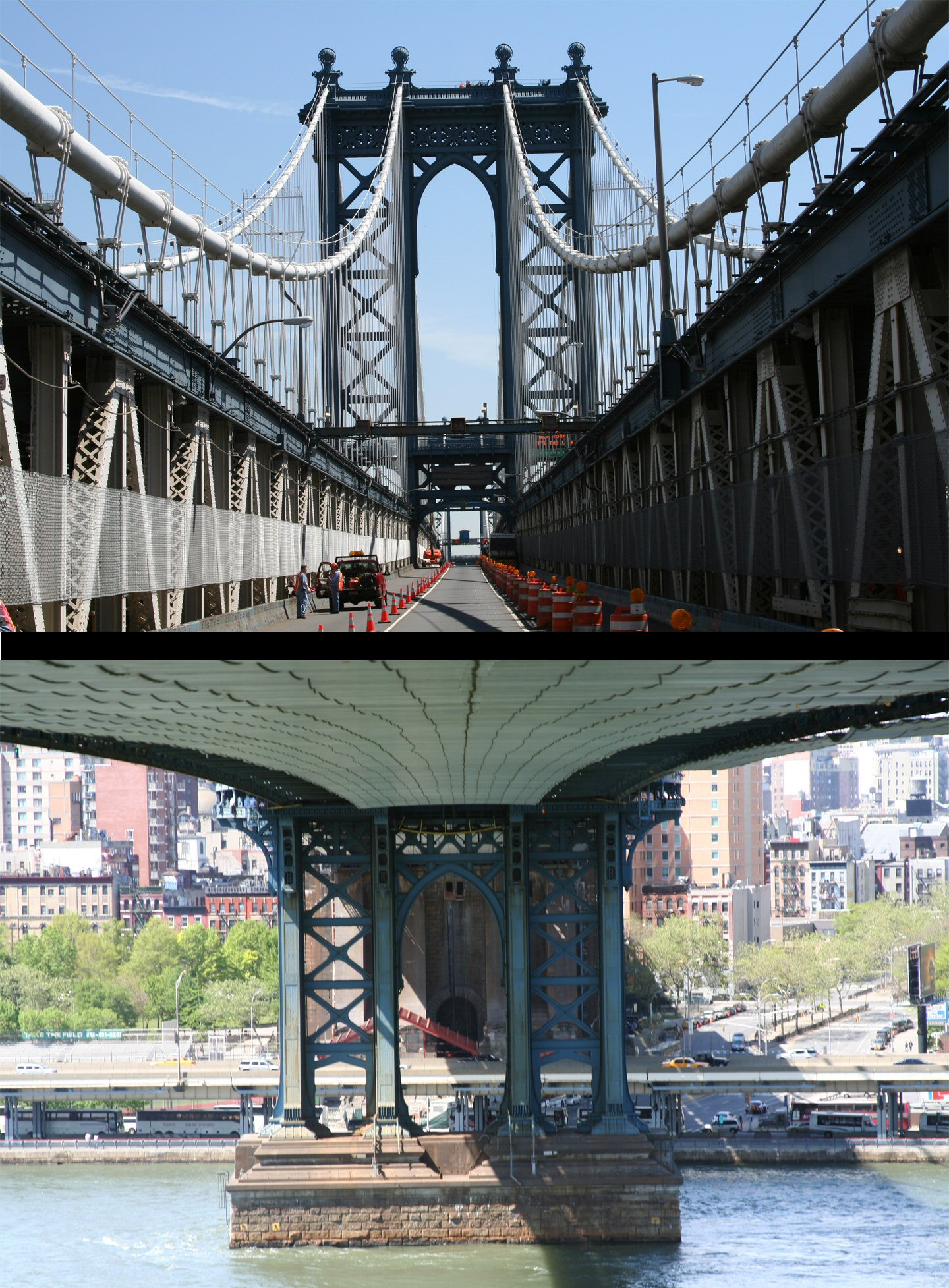
Cross section of the bridge

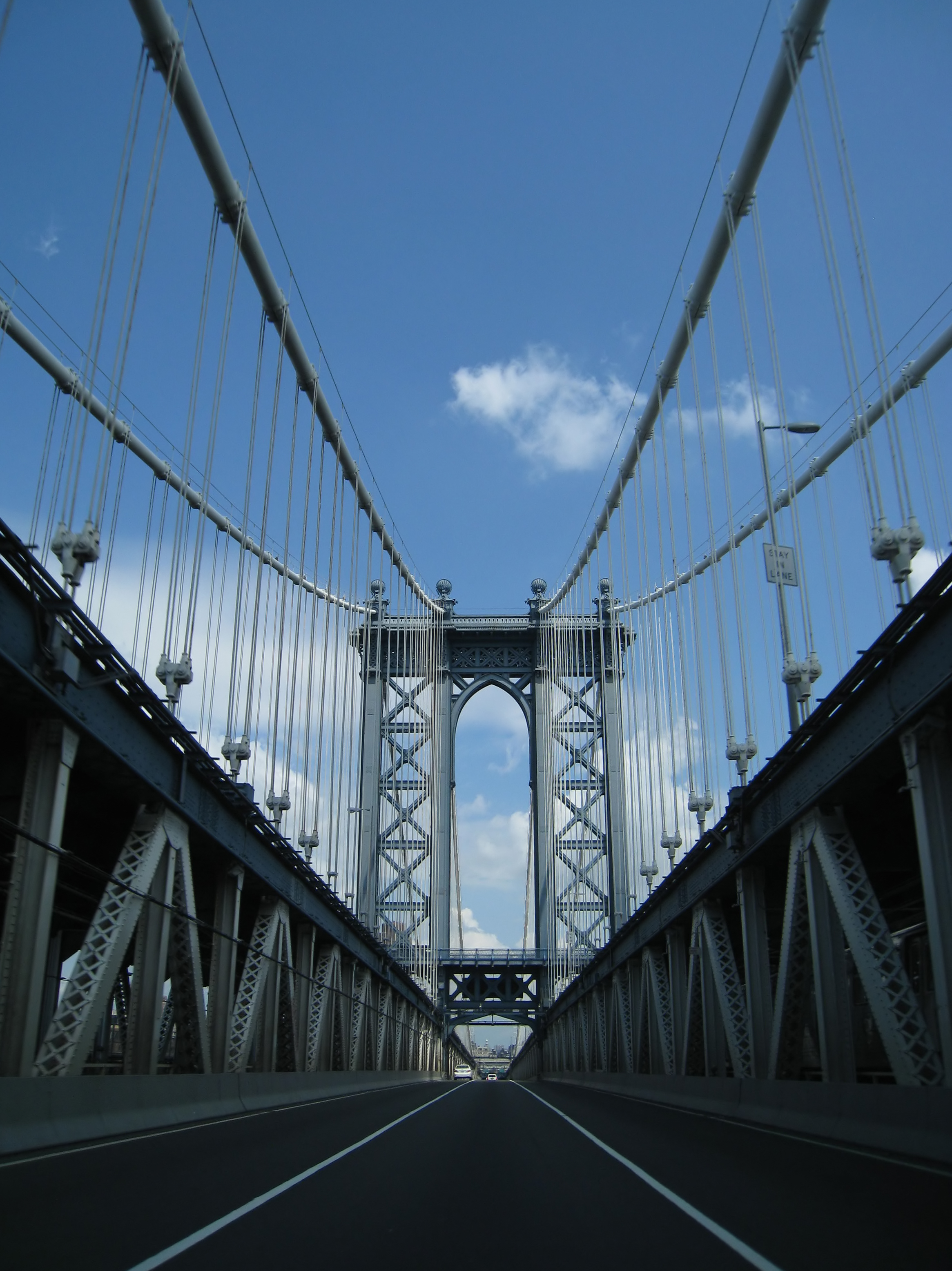
Manhattan-bound lower level

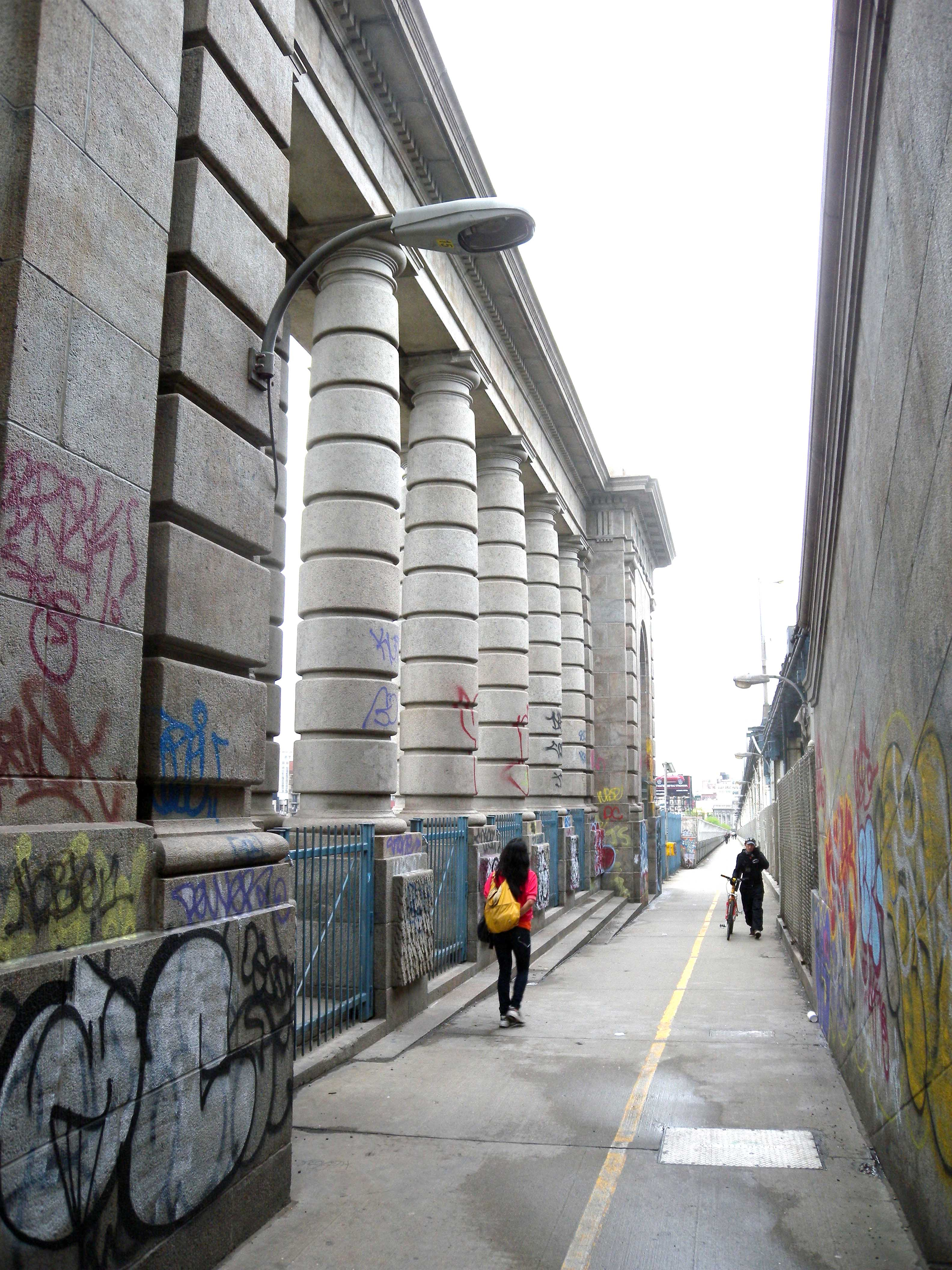
One of the pedestrian walkways

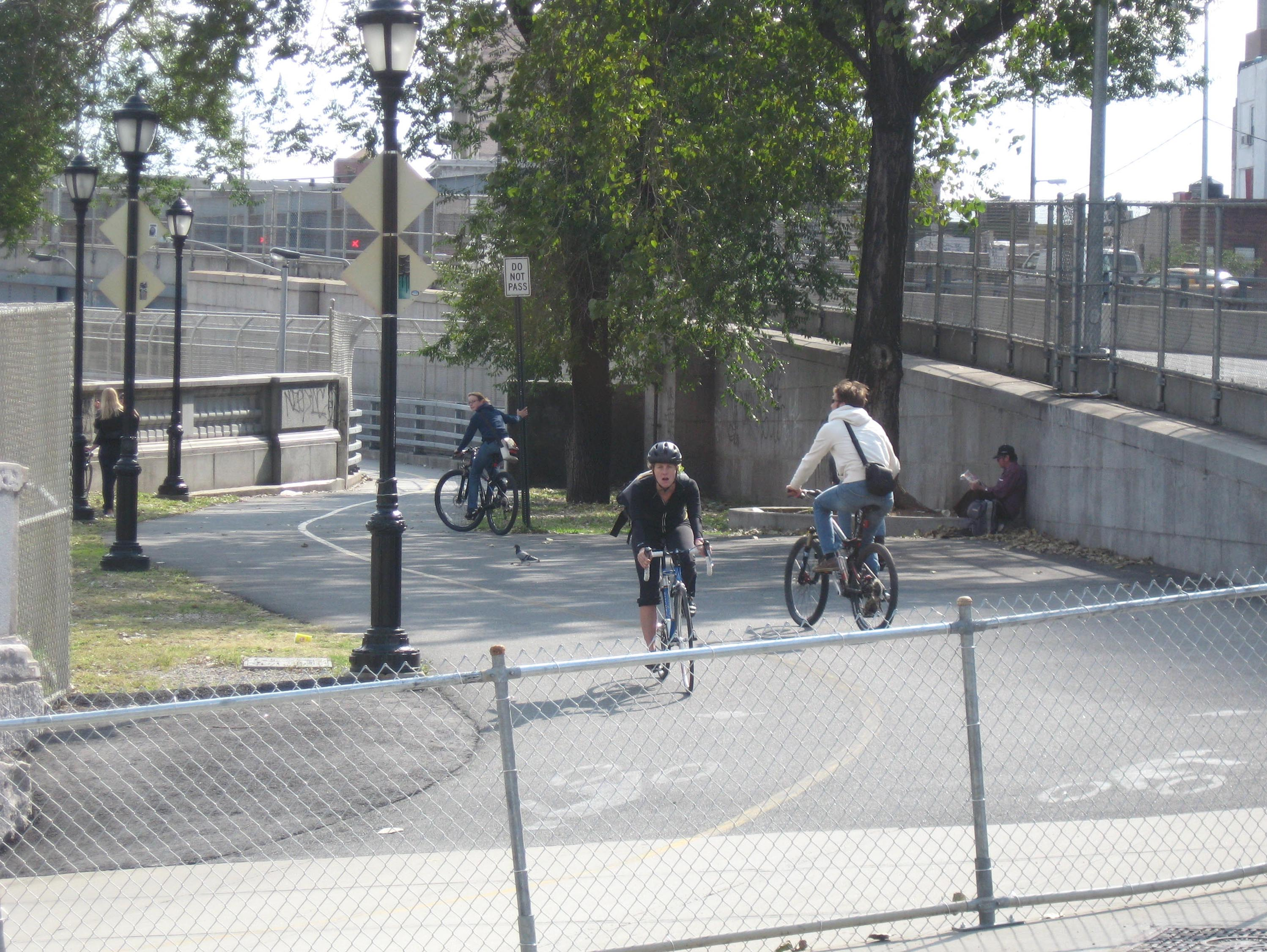
Bikeway in Manhattan

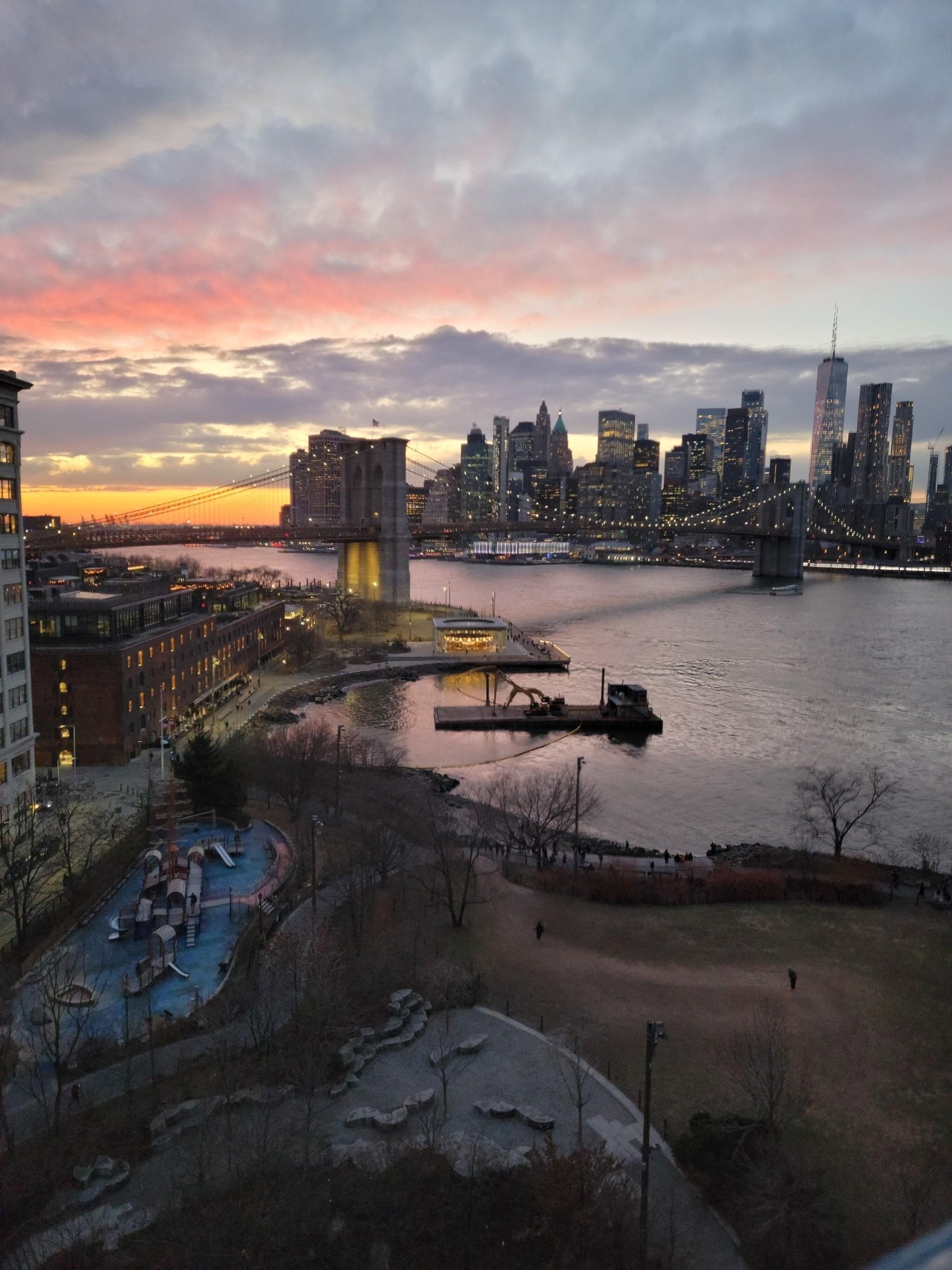
Brooklyn side of the walking path at sunset

== See also ==
- List of bridges and tunnels in New York City
- List of New York City Designated Landmarks in Manhattan below 14th Street
- National Register of Historic Places listings in Brooklyn
- National Register of Historic Places listings in Manhattan below 14th Street
