= Isle La Motte Light =

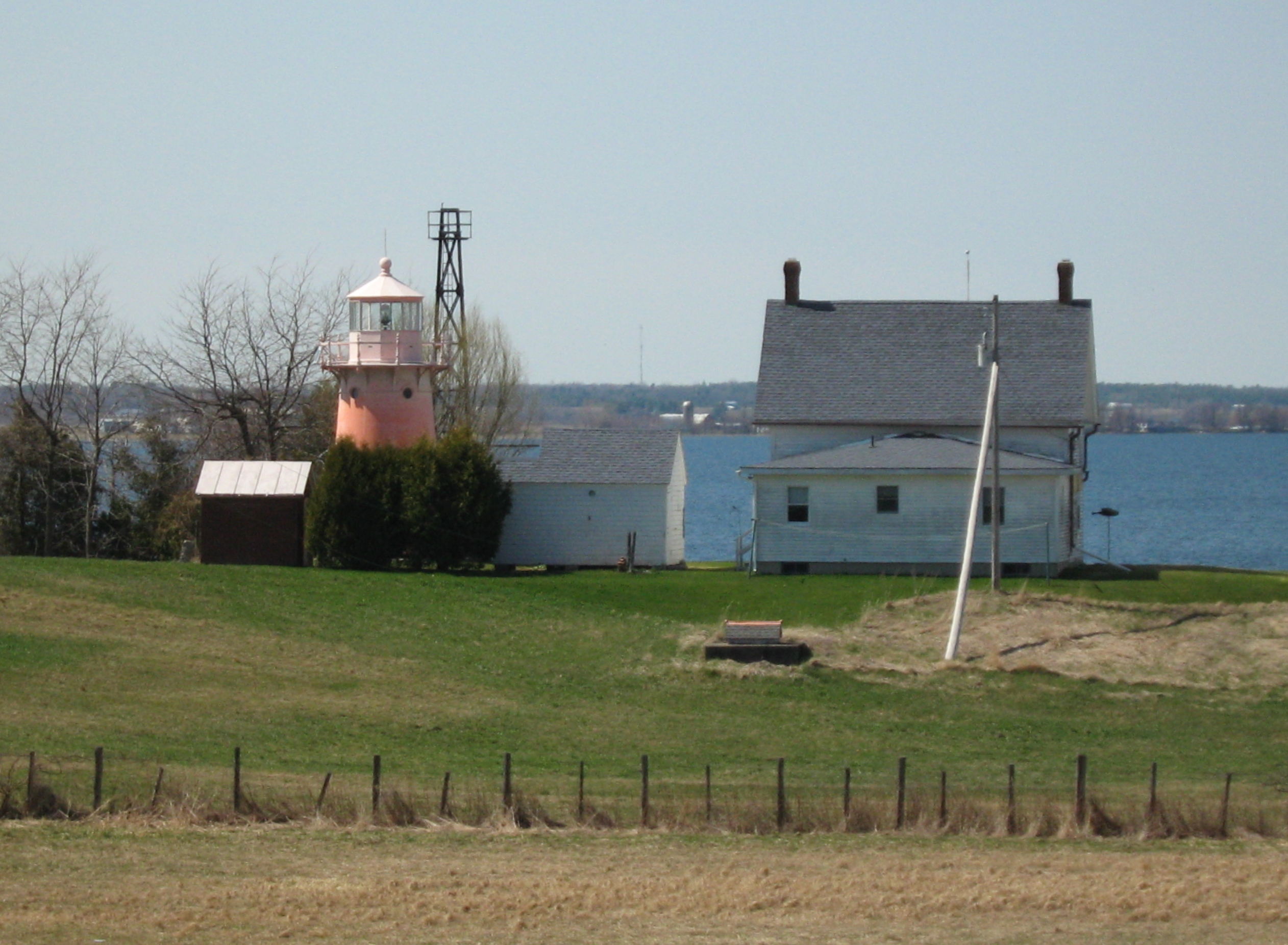
- Viewed from North Point Road cul-de-sac. The 1930s skeleton tower is clearly visible.
- Location: northern end of Isle La Motte in Lake Champlain
- Coordinates: 44.9065°N 73.3435°W

Tower
- Constructed: 1856 (1st tower); 1881 (2nd tower)
- Foundation: Concrete
- Construction: Cast iron
- Shape: Conical tower
- Markings: Red faded to salmon

Light
- Focal height: 25 feet (7.6 m)
- Lens: Sixth order Fresnel lens (original), 1.15 amp 12 inches (300 mm) prototype (current)

The Isle La Motte Light in Vermont is an iron lighthouse at the northern end of Isle La Motte in Lake Champlain. It is one of several lights on the lake which were reactivated in their original structures early in the 21st century.

== History ==
This light, together with the Windmill Point Light, forms something of a range marking the center of the channel in this section of the lake. A light was placed here as early as 1829; some sources state it was initially a lantern simply hung in a tree, but all agree that it was soon hung in an upper story window of a stone house (still standing today).

In 1856 the Lighthouse Board purchased a small plot and erected a stone pyramid on it, with a lantern placed at its peak. This light was first lit in 1857 and was tended by a local farmer rather than by a dedicated keeper. The farmer lived at some distance from the light, and there were constant problems with the lamp being extinguished on stormy nights.

After requests through the first part of the decade, a permanent light station was established, with a round cast iron tower and a wooden keeper's house. This tower was of the same design as used in a number of smaller lights in the area, and its sixth-order Fresnel lens was lighted for the first time in 1881. Like many other Lake Champlain lights, it was supplanted in the 1930s by a separate skeleton tower with an acetylene beacon. As was also typically the case, however, the tower and keeper's house passed into private hands.

Ironically, the cost-saving measure proved to be a maintenance drain in later years; by the turn of the century, the steel towers erected in the 1930s were in need of substantial repair or replacement. By this time the old light belonged to members of the Clark family, which also owned the Windmill Point Light. As with the latter, discussion with the Coast Guard led to placement of a new solar-powered beacon in the old tower in 2002. The tower was at one time painted red, but it has faded to a distinctive salmon pink color (sometime called "Nantucket red").
