= Janet McDonald =

American novelist (1953–2007)

- Janet McDonald in Paris in 2006
- Born: August 10, 1953; Brooklyn, U.S.
- Died: April 11, 2007 (aged 53); Paris, France
- Education: Vassar College (AB); Columbia University (MS); New York University (JD)
- Occupations: Attorney, Author
- Writing career
- Genres: Young adult fiction, Memoir

Janet McDonald (August 10, 1953 – April 11, 2007) was an American writer of young adult novels as well as the author of Project Girl, a memoir about her early life in Vinegar Hill, Brooklyn's Farragut Houses and struggle to achieve an Ivy League education. Her best known children's book is Spellbound, which tells the story of a teenaged mother who wins a spelling competition and a college scholarship. The book was named as one of the American Library Association's eighty-four Best Books for Young Adults in 2002. In 2003, her novel Chill Wind won her the John Steptoe Award for New Talent.

In addition to books, McDonald also wrote articles for publications such as Slate, including one in which she paid psychic Sylvia Browne $700 for a telephone reading. McDonald was a member of Mensa, the high IQ society.

== Biography ==
After graduating from Vassar (1977), Columbia University Graduate School of Journalism (1984), and New York University Law School (1986), McDonald practiced law in New York City (1986–89) and Seattle (1989–91). She took a position as an intern at a Paris law firm (1991–93) before moving to Olympia, Washington, to work in the Attorney General's office and teach French language classes at Evergreen State College. McDonald settled in Paris in 1995 to work first as an international attorney and then as a writer, until she died of cancer in 2007.

== Bibliography ==
=== Books ===
- — (1999). Project Girl. New York: Farrar, Straus and Giroux. ISBN 0-374-23757-3.
- — (2003). Spellbound. New York, N.Y., U.S.A: Puffin Books. ISBN 0-14-250193-X.
- — (2003). Twists and Turns. New York: Farrar, Straus and Giroux. ISBN 0-374-40006-7.
- — (2004). Brother Hood. New York: Farrar, Straus and Giroux. ISBN 0-374-30995-7.
- — (2006). Chill Wind. Farrar, Straus and Giroux (BYR). ISBN 0-374-41183-2.
- — (2006). Harlem Hustle. Farrar, Straus and Giroux (BYR). ISBN 0-374-37184-9.
- — (2007). Off-Color. Farrar, Straus and Giroux (BYR). ISBN 978-0-374-37196-8.
- — (2004). Skin Deep (Anthology) "Zebra Girl". Puffin Books. ISBN 978-0141315058.
- — (2011). Paris Was Ours (Anthology) "Just Another American". Algonquin Books of Chapel Hill. ISBN 978-1-56512-953-5.

=== Articles ===
- "Up the Down Staircase: Where Snoop and Shakespeare Meet". Horn Book Magazine. 81 (6): 747–750. November–December 2005. Archived from the original on May 24, 2012.
- "X-Patriate". Literary Review. 47 (1): 58–62. Fall 2003.
- "Double Life". Literary Review. 45 (4): 679–685. Summer 2002.
- "Educating Janet". Teacher Magazine. 10 (4): 46–52. January 1999.
- "Booklist Interview". Booklist. 98 (12): 1026. February 15, 2002.
- "A Sister in Paris". Essence. 25 (1): 54. May 1994.
- "Crystal bawl". Slate. January 8, 2003. Archived from the original on September 27, 2012.
- "Black like (white) me". Slate. August 24, 1998. Archived from the original on May 21, 2014.
- "A dime bag for the schoolgirl". Slate. February 4, 1999. Archived from the original on May 21, 2014.
- "Project Girls". The Village Voice. January 16, 2001. Archived from the original on January 12, 2010.

== Quotes ==
- "Freedom is ... not about nothing left to lose, it's about nothing left to be; you don't have to be anything."
- "Paris is where I became possible. It's where I became free."
