= Candida Alvarez =

American painter

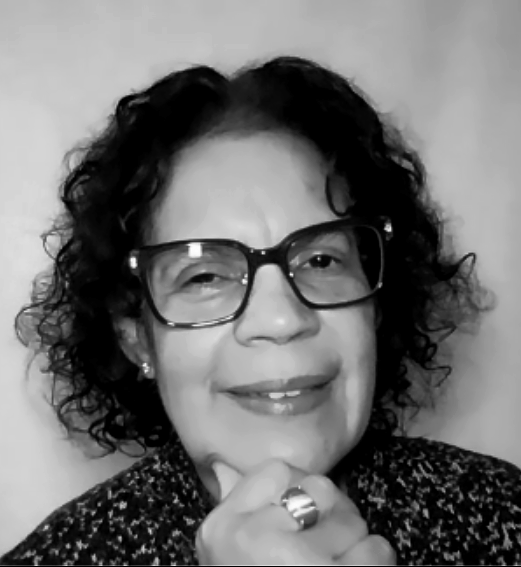
- Born: 1955 (age 70–71); Brooklyn, New York, US
- Education: Yale School of Art, Skowhegan School of Painting and Sculpture, Fordham University
- Known for: Painting, drawing, public art
- Children: Ramon Alvarez-Smikle
- Awards: US Latinx Artist Fellow, American Academy of Arts and Letters, Helen Frankenthaler, Joan Mitchell, Pollock-Krasner
- Website: Candida Alvarez

Candida Alvarez, Are you listening to this?, acrylic on linen, metallic marker, liquid glitter, 84" x 72", 2022.

Candida Alvarez (born 1955) is an American artist and professor, known for her paintings and drawings.

Alvarez has exhibited at the Whitney Museum of American Art, MoMA PS1, Museum of Contemporary Art Chicago, and Contemporary Arts Museum Houston, Her work belongs to the public art collections of the Whitney, Art Institute of Chicago, San Jose Museum of Art, and Virginia Museum of Fine Arts, among others. She was named a 2022 US Latinx Artist Fellow and has been recognized by the Helen Frankenthaler Foundation, Joan Mitchell Foundation and Pollock-Krasner Foundation. She lives and works in Chicago and Baroda, Michigan and is a professor of painting and drawing at the School of the Art Institute of Chicago.

== Education and career ==
Alvarez was born in 1955 in Brooklyn to parents who had arrived from Puerto Rico two years earlier. She grew up in a high-rise building in the Farragut Houses public housing project in Vinegar Hill, Brooklyn. Alvarez attended Fordham University at Lincoln Center in New York and received a BA in studio art/liberal arts in 1977; she studied at the Skowhegan School of Painting and Sculpture in 1981. In her early career in New York, she worked as a curator at El Museo del Barrio and exhibited in group shows at institutions including the Brooklyn Museum, MoMA PS1, Studio Museum in Harlem (artist residency) and Jamaica Arts Center. During that time, she had solo shows at Exit Art (1985), Queens Museum (1991), and Bronx Museum of the Arts (1992), among others.

In 1995, she enrolled at the Yale School of Art, studying with Mel Bochner, Rochelle Feinstein and Howardena Pindell. Her studies there set the stage for the playful form of abstraction for which she is known, and culminated in an MFA in 1997. The following year, she accepted a position at the School of the Art Institute of Chicago, where she is the F. H. Sellers Professor in Painting. In her later career, Alvarez has been included in major surveys of abstraction ("Magnetic Fields: Expanding American Abstraction, 1960s to Today," Kemper Museum of Contemporary Art, 2017) and Latinx art ("Estamos Bien – La Trienal 20/21," El Museo del Barrio, 2021; "Latinx Abstract," BRIC, 2021; "no existe un mundo poshuracán: Puerto Rican Art in the Wake of Hurricane Maria," Whitney Museum, 2022). She has had solo exhibitions at the Hyde Park Art Center (2012), Chicago Cultural Center (2017), GAVLAK Gallery (Palm Beach, 2019; Los Angeles, 2021) and Monique Meloche Gallery (Chicago, 2020), among other venues.

In 2017, six existing color works by Alvarez were adapted by Japanese fashion designer Rei Kawakubo for her "new camouflage" Comme des Garçons haute couture menswear collection.

== Work and reception ==
Alvarez reworks both materials and methods in her work, resisting a single visual methodology and disrupting distinctions between abstraction, representation and conceptualism. Her painting synthesizes a wide array of modes: floating color fields, highly structured geometries, subdued figural portraits, text and invisible guiding systems. Critic Susan Snodgrass has described Alvarez’s process as syncretic and belonging "to a strategy of cultural fusion and hybridity that allows passage between different contexts and histories, as does her use of personal narratives and private symbols as markers of identity."

Candida Alvarez, Sit, Stand & Kneel, acrylic and gel medium on canvas, 63" x 76.25", 1986.

=== Early work ===
In the 1980s, Alvarez produced largely representational paintings that drew on her city experiences and Puerto Rican heritage, mixing portraiture, landscape, written words and personal iconography. She often portrayed family members; He loved to dream (1985) was a mixed-mode work of flat planes, sharp angles and relief imagery depicting her father. Paintings such as the three-panel, altar-piece-like work, Sit, Stand & Kneel (1986) or Soy Boricua (I am Puerto Rican) (1989) portrayed passive, dutiful, wary or increasingly powerful female protagonists as they navigated roles and identities. Critics characterized these color- and imagery-laden revelations of self and traditional family life as introspective, moody, emotionally charged and reminiscent of magic realism, naïve art or confessional poetry; Arts Magazine's Peggy Cyphers likened them to the art of Marc Chagall and Paul Klee.

In subsequent work, Alvarez experimented with new mixed-media materials, textures and multi-panel formats that functioned as both structural and narrative devices. Her solo exhibitions at the Bronx Museum of the Arts (1992) and New Britain Museum of American Art (1996) featured multi-image paintings of rudimentary human forms and abstract primal energies that evoked themes of organic or inner growth. New York Times critic Holland Cotter wrote that the " lyrical, painterly work" charted progress "from darkness to light and from fragmentation to wholeness," drawing strength from its ambiguity regarding the relationships between human figures and natural forces. The panels hinted at sequential, internal passages while also serving as external, quasi-architectural spaces, alluding to the 14th-floor housing-project windows she looked out of as a child (e.g., Sisters I and Sisters 2, 1992; Sixteen Stories, 1996). This work presaged her later interest in minimalist seriality and gestural abstraction.

=== Later work ===
During her time at Yale, Alvarez studied color theory and began experimenting with intuitive processes, puzzles and games, in part influenced by her friendship with the minimalist and conceptual artist Sol LeWitt. These strategies pushed her work toward abstraction and remixed its clearly autobiographical aspects, while maintaining its attention to process and inspirational roots. Paintings such as Tossing Pennies (1995), which incorporated pennies and colorful painted orbs as nodes in a connect-the-dots scheme, were determined by chance; in similarly vibrant and graphic works, she used letters and numbers as organizing systems (e.g., Louise or Jimmy, both 1996).

In the 2000s, Alvarez's work has been characterized by a decorative visuality and postmodern versatility that ranges across contemporary styles. Her TBA Exhibition Space show (2005) featured quirky, graffiti-like drawings and large fabric pieces evoking toys, keepsakes and personal history. Drawings such as Celia Mia (2000–1) juxtaposed floral and geometric patterns, text and playful characters, while the fabric works depicted such figures with bold black shapes and lines stitched in black embroidery floss on curtain-like squares of black cotton.

Alvarez's later exhibitions—"Mambomountain" (Hyde Park Art Center, 2012), "Here" (Chicago Cultural Center, 2017), "Estoy Bien" (Monique Meloche Gallery, 2020) and "Palimpsest" (GAVLAK Los Angeles, 2021)—have been more painting-focused. In monumental works such as mary in the sky with diamonds (2005), arroz amargo (2010) and hi ho silver (2008), she created shifting, layered surfaces packed with textures, ideas and scraps of pop culture. New City compared the billowing shapes, sinuous lines and snippets of text of the latter painting to "a cartoon that’s been chopped up in a blender." The "Here" retrospective presented nearly sixty works spanning forty years. The show was achronolgically arranged to create connections, and united by "camouflage" baseboard molding running throughout that derived from the work used in her Comme des Garçons collaboration. New works included subtle plays between inside and outside, felt and seen (e.g., Listening to Haruki Murakami while looking at a sunset, 2016) and whimsical challenges to the rigidity and authority of the modernist grid. Examples of the latter included Remembering Sol LeWitt (2016)—which combined a predictable checkerboard, a casually meandering web, gold glitter and scripted text—and the spatially disorienting Rainbows on my Studio Floor (2016), a receding, slightly askew pattern of saturated parallelograms based the exhibition space's tiled floor.

Candida Alvarez, Here to There, from "Air Paintings" (2017-19); left image: front, right image: back; latex ink, acrylic, enamel, and glitter on PVC mesh with aluminum and wood; 81" x 71" x 26"; 2018.

The "Estoy Bien" ("I'm fine") exhibition featured large, double-sided "Air Paintings" that employed multiple visual idioms and referenced loss (her father's recent death), seasonal cycles and the effects of climate change—in particular, Puerto Rico’s devastation by Hurricane Maria. The paintings were made of partly translucent PVC-mesh material and suspended from freestanding aluminum frames. She created them by printing collages of digitally manipulated images from her studio practice onto the mesh, which she then modified with gestural applications of latex ink, glitter and paint and painted fields of geometric and camouflage-like forms (e.g., Here to There, 2018).

The show's title painting, Estoy Bien, a vibrant, pastel-colored work featuring abstract splashes of coral, aqua blue and white paint, inspired the name and theme of El Museo del Barrio's first-ever national survey of contemporary Latino work—the largest in its history—"Estamos Bien — La Trienal 20/21." New York Times critic Holland Cotter described Alvarez's title as complex and "tinged with irony, the words suggest[ing] both resilience and bitterness"; the museum called it "a declaration of defiant resilience and a provocation, conflating a sarcastic and a positive tone." The exhibition (which included Alvarez) confronted systems of power and examined identity, structural racism, migration, displacement, climate and ecological justice through the work of 42 artists and collectives.

In the "Palimpsest" paintings (2021), Alvarez employed a similar process to her "Air Paintings," scanning and printing drawings—in this case, on one-sided canvases—then applying successive transparent layers that effaced and intermingled with the initial images, creating complex records of action and time.

The El Museo del Barrio exhibited her works in Candida Alvarez: Circle, Point, Hoop from April 24, 2025 to August 3, 2025. The exhibit displayed works from her 5 decade career including paintings and sculptures.

== Awards and recognition ==
In 2022, Alvarez was named a US Latinx Artist Fellow (Ford Foundation and Mellon Foundation) and received an Arts and Letters award in Art from the American Academy of Arts and Letters. She has also been recognized by the Helen Frankenthaler Foundation (2021), Joan Mitchell Foundation (2019), International Artists' Studio Program (Stockholm, 1999), Pollock-Krasner Foundation (1994), Mid-Atlantic-NEA Regional Fellowship (1988) and New York Foundation for the Arts (1986). She has been awarded artist residencies by the LUMA Foundation (Arles), MacDowell Colony, MoMA PS1, Pilchuck Glass School and the Studio Museum in Harlem.

Alvarez's work belongs to public art collections including the Addison Gallery of American Art, Art Institute of Chicago, Baltimore Museum of Art, Blanton Museum of Art, Brandywine Workshop and Archives, DePaul Art Museum, El Museo Del Barrio, Museum of Contemporary Art Chicago, Pérez Art Museum Miami, San Jose Museum of Art, Studio Museum in Harlem, Virginia Museum of Fine Arts, and Whitney Museum, among others. She has also received and completed three public art commissions. These include What do you See?, a set of six stained glass windows created for the P.S. 306 (public school) in the Bronx; the MTA Arts & Design project, B is for Birds in the Bronx (2006), faceted glass windscreens installed at the New York's Bronx Park East station; and Howlings—Soft Paintings (2017), a latex-on-PVC mural installed on the banks of the Chicago River as a part of Chicago's Year of Public Art.
