= Farragut Houses =

Public housing development in Brooklyn, New York

- NYCHA property
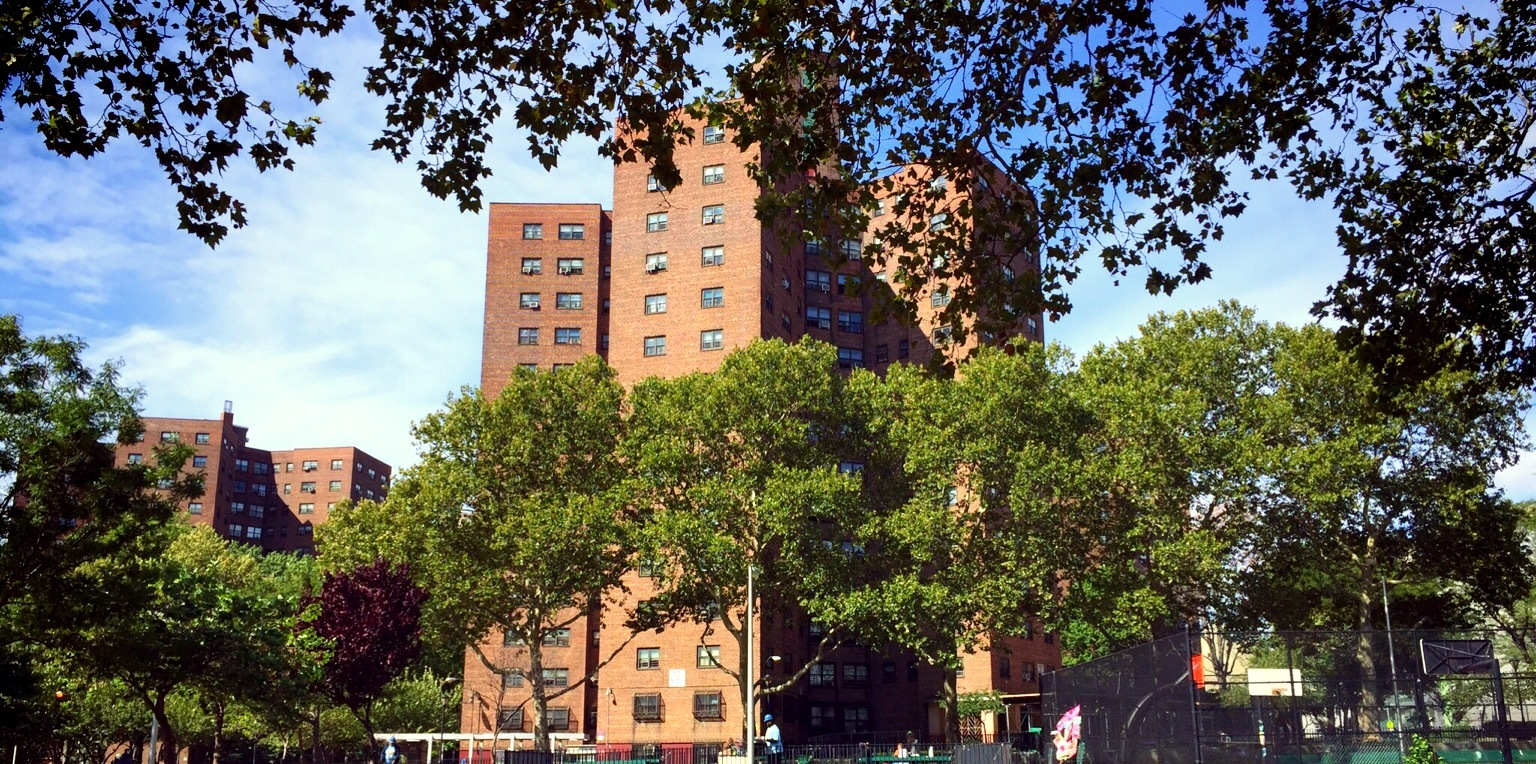
- One of the buildings of Farragut Housing in 2015
- Interactive map of Farragut Houses
- Coordinates: 40.700°N 73.983°W
- Country: United States
- State: New York
- City: New York City
- Borough: Brooklyn

Area
  - Total: 0.026 sq mi (0.067 km^{2})

Population
  - Total: 3,272
  - Density: 130,000/sq mi (49,000/km^{2})
- ZIP Codes: 11201
- Area codes: 718, 347, 929, and 917
- Average household income: $21,000
- Website: my.nycha.info/DevPortal/

The Farragut Houses is a public housing project located in the downtown neighborhood of northwestern Brooklyn, New York City, bordering the Brooklyn Navy Yard. Farragut Houses is a property of New York City Housing Authority (NYCHA). The houses contain 3,272 residents who reside in ten buildings that are each 13 to 14 stories high.

== History ==
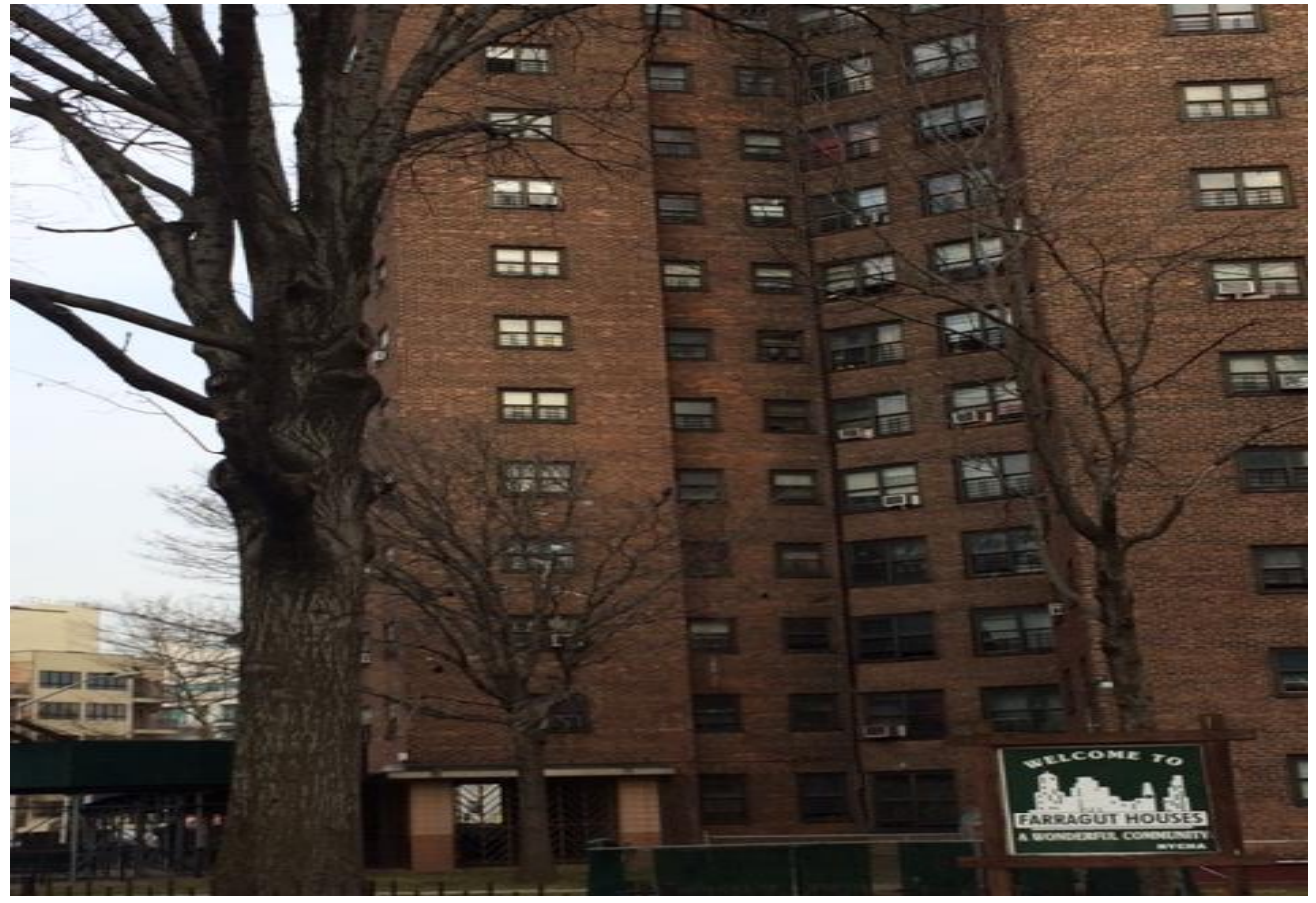
Front view

The Farragut Houses are located in what used to be a heavily industrial area, near the Brooklyn Navy Yard. The site was occupied by 341 lots by 1941, of which 27 were vacant. Of the 314 lots that were extant, 198 consisted of wood structures. Wooden buildings were rarely built after the Great Fire of New York in 1835, and brick became the popular building material around the 1870s, so these structures were likely more than a century old.

The land for Farragut Houses was cleared starting in 1945. Prior to demolition, there was still an active neighborhood, with 144 stores that were occupied and 30 unoccupied, as well as 677 apartments, 33 one-family dwellings, and 61 two-family dwellings whose occupants needed to be relocated. There were a total of approximately 970 families to be relocated.

In 1949 the state approved the Farragut Housing projects fund for $15,087,000. The estimated rental price per room at that time was $5.82. The first residents started moving in that year; the average rent was between $33.50–$44 a month, including utilities. The three superblocks of the development were completed by 1952. The area consisted of 18 smaller blocks divided by roads and small alleyways. Eight streets—Talman Street, Charles Street, High Street, Prospect Street, Dixon Place, Fern Place and Greene Lane—were destroyed by the joining of these smaller blocks when demolition started in 1945. Hudson Avenue was cut off between Front and York Street and diverted over to Navy Street.

During wartime, the region was filled with sailors. Restaurants, illegal drinking establishments, tattoo parlors and brothels were packed with people who worked or commuted along the waterfront. Dirty and narrow streets provided a haven for derelict behavior. The Farragut Houses were built during a moment of industrial and economic growth, and the surrounding area contains infrastructure of this time of industrial development: waterfront piers, warehouses, industrial buildings, the Brooklyn-Queens Expressway, and the confluence of the Brooklyn and Manhattan Bridges in nearby Dumbo. The Brooklyn Navy Yard and other industries in Brooklyn declined after World War II and then closed in the mid-1960s, contributing to economic decline in the borough as a whole.

== Demographics ==
Population per year
Year	Population
1970	5,232
1980	4,950
1990	5,106
2000	4,314
2010	3,440

According to NYCHA, the Farragut Houses housing project has 1,390 apartments and 3,440 residents living in ten 13- and 14-story buildings in Vinegar Hill, within Brooklyn Community Board 2. The density of the population in Farragut Houses was 55,384.4 per square mile (21,384.0/km^{2}) in 2013, and the Farragut Houses' total population in 2013 was 13,954. In 2003 the density of the population in Farragut Houses was 57,533.2 per square mile (22,213.7/km^{2}), compared to 27,044.71 per square mile (10,442.02/km^{2}) in 2010 and 60,683.7 per square mile (23,430.1/km^{2}) in 2000.

== Social problems ==
=== Crime ===
The Farragut Houses are patrolled by the 84th Precinct of the NYPD, located at 301 Gold Street. The 84th Precinct ranked 60th-safest out of 69 patrol areas for per-capita crime in 2010. This was attributed to a high rate of property crimes in the neighborhood.

The 84th Precinct has a lower crime rate than in the 1990s, with crimes across all categories having decreased by 82.3% between 1990 and 2018. The precinct reported 2 murders, 18 rapes, 147 robberies, 184 felony assaults, 126 burglaries, 650 grand larcenies, and 31 grand larcenies auto in 2018.

Based on an incarceration map from 2009, which shows the blocks and neighborhoods of Brooklyn and the prison expenditures for those respective areas, the Farragut Housing area has a prison expenditure of around $500,000–$750,000. These prison expenditures are the costs of incarcerating residents of that specific area. This range is lower than other neighborhoods in Community Board 3, some of which have prison expenditures exceeding $1,000,000.

In 2014, as part of security measures being undertaken in NYCHA properties around the city, NYCHA installed security cameras in eleven high-crime housing projects around Brooklyn, including the Farragut Houses.

NYCHA has taken precautions to protect their residents, and the New York City Police Department Housing Bureau offers many programs and initiatives, which train residents to be vigilant and actively stop criminal activity around them. These also teach youth to consider law enforcement as a career goal and instilling a sense of morals. The Resident Watch program, which has spanned for 40 years, allows residents to take initiative on stopping crime, and is active in four of ten buildings.

=== Poverty and social isolation ===
The Farragut Houses are separated from the rest of Brooklyn by the Brooklyn-Queens Expressway, making the area relatively hard to access from the south. The poverty-stricken area stands in sharp contrast to nearby blocks in Dumbo and Vinegar Hill, where the median income is $148,611, rents average around $3,000 a month, and apartments can sell for over one million dollars. The average Farragut Houses family, by contrast, makes $21,000 annually. Eighty-eight percent of public school students in the area live below the poverty line, and crime in the Farragut Houses is significantly higher than in Dumbo and Vinegar Hill.

There are a lack of affordable healthy food options in the area, making the area a food desert. Options include a Chinese restaurant, some bodegas, and a "small grocery store with a single aisle of produce." A development project including a supermarket to serve the area was first proposed in 2010. After years of delays, a Wegmans store opened in 2019.

From 2008 until 2015, the housing project did not have a laundry room in any of the buildings, so residents had to walk at least 1 mile (1.6 km) to go to one of two laundromats along Myrtle Avenue.

In 2010, the administration of former New York City Mayor Michael Bloomberg proposed to revitalize Admiral's Row, a run-down block of Second Empire-style houses in the Navy Yard; however, the project was delayed after two developers severed connections with the projects. Admiral's Row was later demolished and a Wegmans supermarket was being built on the site. Wegmans opened on October 27, 2019 and serves the Farragut Houses.

== Transportation ==
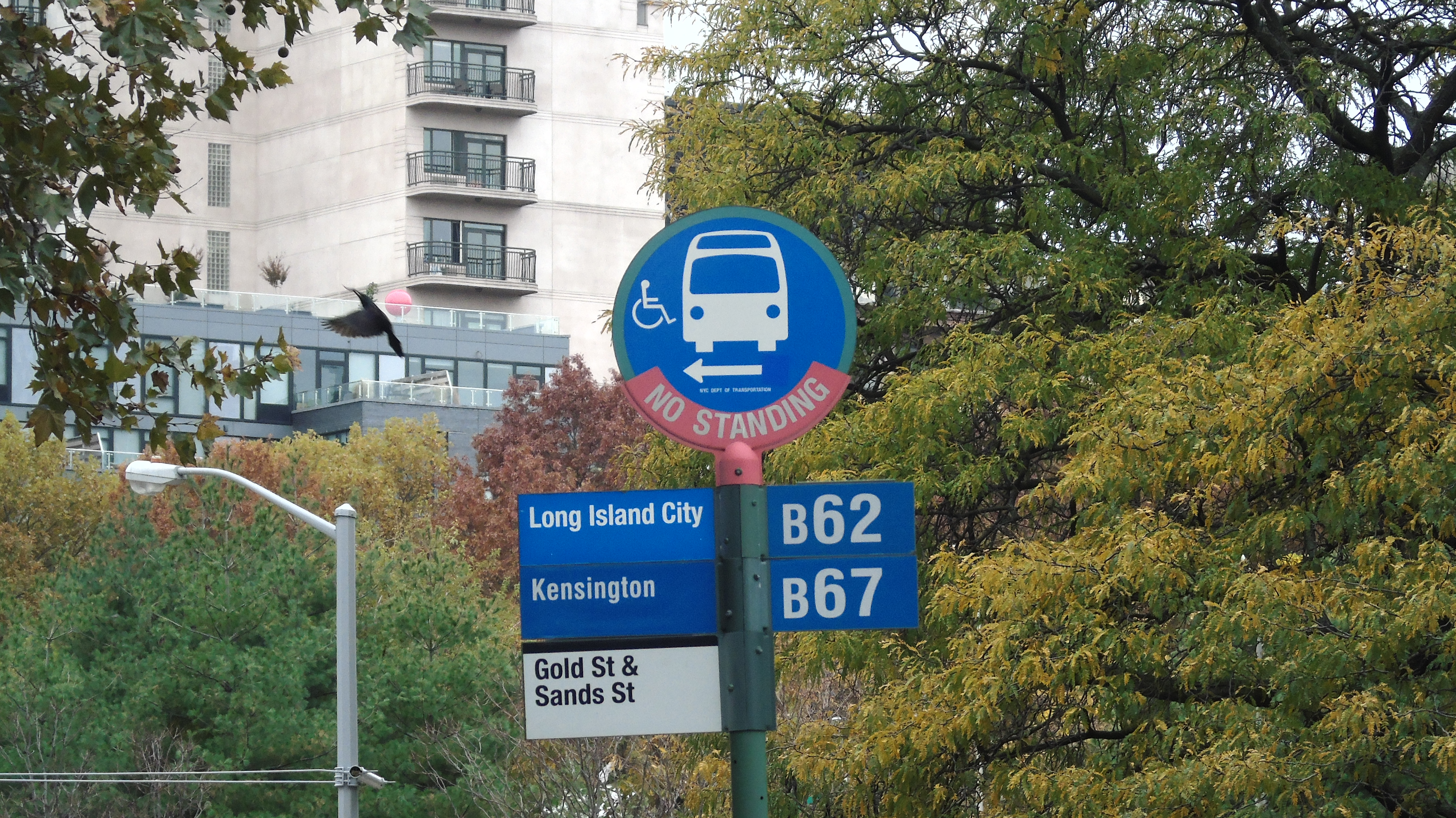
Bus stop at Gold and Sands Streets

The Farragut Houses are served by the New York City Subway, with the F and <F> trains stopping at York Street 0.2 miles (0.32 km) away and the A and C trains stopping at High Street. The nearby Jay Street–MetroTech complex is served by the A, C, F, <F>, N, R, and W trains.

The housing project is also served by four bus routes: the B57, B62, B67, and B69, all of which run right through the housing project. All of these routes also go to downtown Brooklyn and connect with the Jay Street complex.

In contrast to other places, subway service to the Farragut Houses area has declined over the decades. In the late 19th and early 20th centuries, the neighborhood was served by elevated lines and trolleys. The first elevated railway, the BMT Myrtle Avenue Line, came to downtown Brooklyn in 1885 and ran only a few blocks away. The N, R, and W trains' station at Lawrence Street (now Jay Street–MetroTech) opened on June 11, 1924. High Street opened on June 24, 1933, and York Street on April 9, 1936. A trolley ran on Sands, Jay, and Hudson Streets, very close to the site of Farragut Houses, although the last trolley cars were retired on March 4, 1951, the same year the Farragut Houses opened, and the last trolley bus ran on Flushing Avenue to High Street on July 27, 1960. As late as 1951 the Myrtle Avenue El still existed, stopping at Navy Street and Myrtle Avenue, about three blocks from the current site of the Farragut Houses, as it had since the 1880s.

== Education ==
According to the NYC Department of Education, five out of the 10 Farragut Houses buildings are zoned for P.S. 307 Daniel Hale Williams (K307), while two buildings are zoned for P.S. 287 Bailey K. Ashford (K287) and three buildings are zoned for P.S. 8 Robert Fulton (K008). September 2015, the NYC Department of Education proposed a rezoning of the area, which was controversial among residents in adjacent, more affluent Vinegar Hill. After the rezoning was passed, the feedback from many parents was mostly positive and supportive.

Elementary schools include:

- Community Roots Charter School (Saint Edwards Street, Third Floor)
- P.S 307 Daniel Hale Williams (209 York Street)
- P.S 8 Robert Fulton (37 Hicks Street)

Middle schools include:

- Satellite West Middle School (209 York Street)
- Community Roots Middle School (50 Navy Street, Third Floor)

== Religion ==
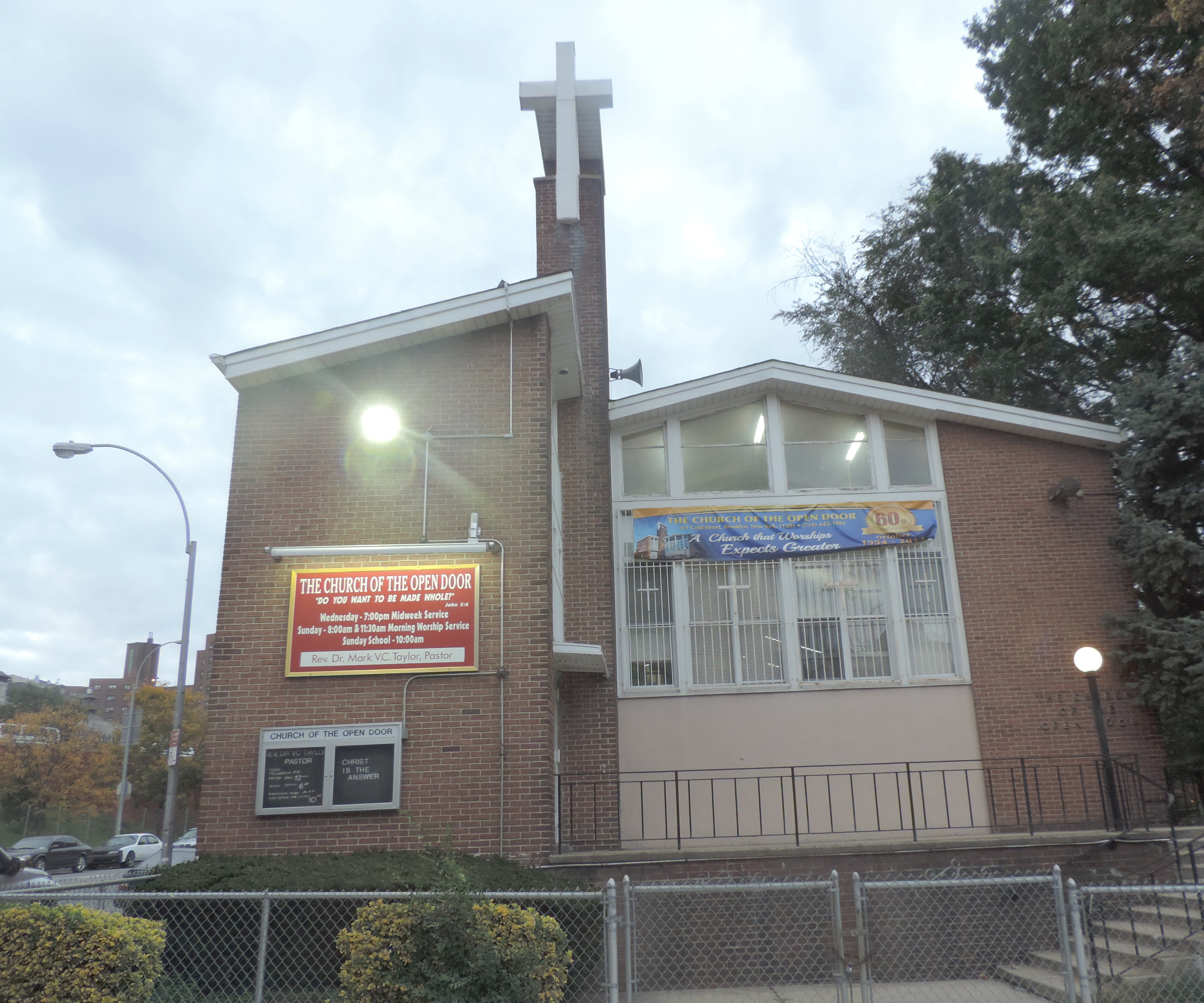
Church of the Open Door

The Church of the Open Door, which started construction in 1953, was the first house of worship to be opened within a NYCHA development.

== Infrastructure ==
=== Technology ===
NYCHA is modernizing the Farragut Houses and other NYCHA properties using a program called NextGen NYCHA. There is a MyNYCHA program called "The Digital Van" funded by a Broadband Technology Opportunities Program grant from the United States Department of Commerce; the vans, which are equipped with eight laptops and are available Monday through Friday 10 a.m to 4 p.m., enable residents to use the vans to access the internet. Another app, called the My NYCHA App, allows residents to receive information on service outages, report damages, and request emergency assistance.

=== Water pipes ===
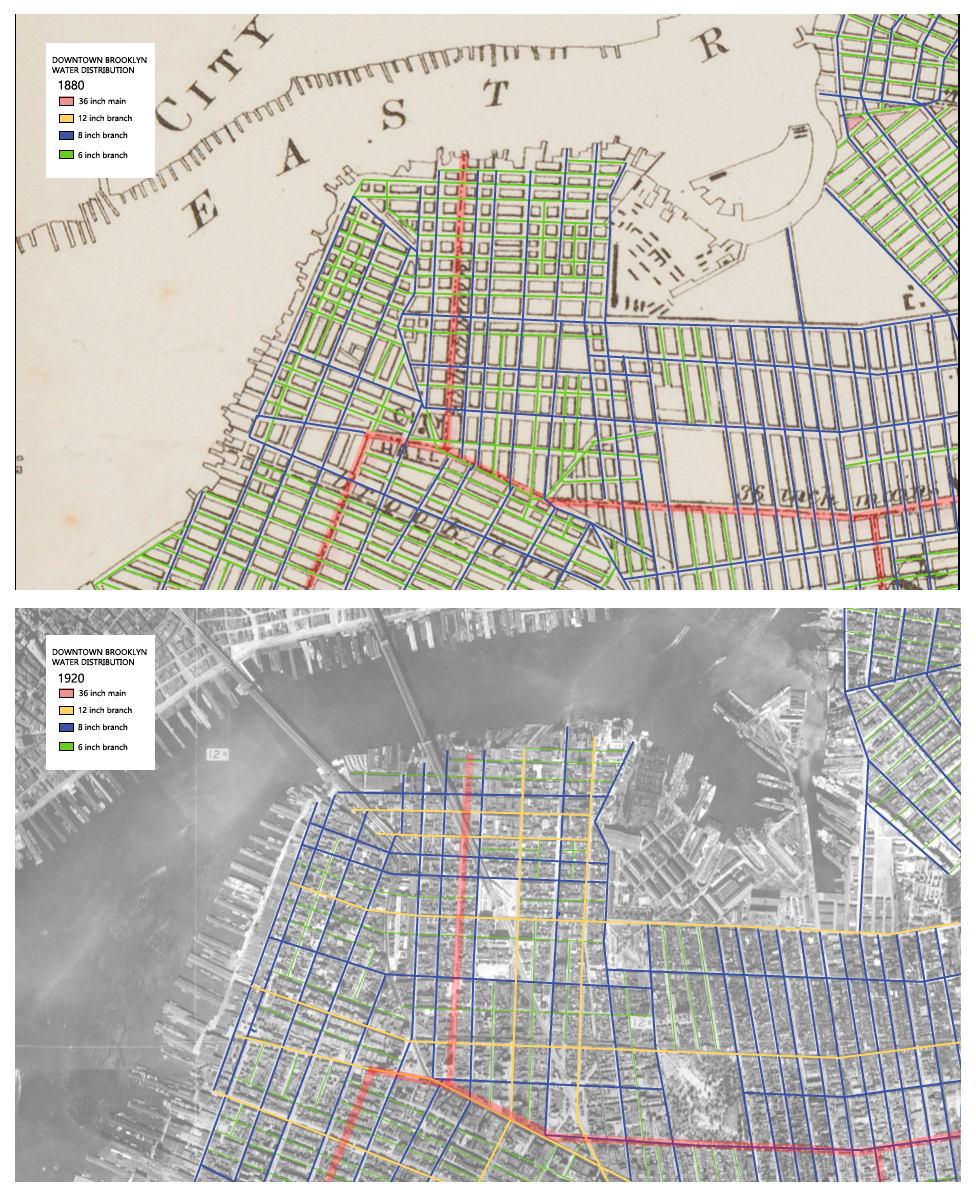
Map of water pipes

The old City of Brooklyn had many water reservoirs. Before the housing project was built, the water was distributed by 36 cast iron main aqueduct pipe to 6-to-8-inch (15 to 20 cm) cast iron branch pipes to the neighborhoods until 1900. The branch pipes replaced 8-to-12-inch (20 to 30 cm) cast iron pipes in the early 1900s.

As the population of the neighborhoods kept increasing, the demand for a larger supply of water increased. The increase in population throughout Brooklyn and the soon-to-be other boroughs also caused a problem with the water supply, as the wellwater became polluted and there was an insufficient supply of water. This caused many health problems as there were only a few sources of water. In response, the city began to create a system of water pipes that flowed through the city, as well as outsourced fresh water supplies outside the city. The New York City water system is managed by the Department of Environmental Protection and consists of three upstate aqueducts—the Croton, Catskill, and Delaware aqueducts—the latter two of which flow through Brooklyn.

Farragut Houses currently uses a more modern water pipe system. The New York City Department of Environmental Protection regulates Farragut Houses' water system and its pipes. Each building has its own water piping system and all buildings share three back up water storage tanks in cases of emergencies such as water outages and storms.

=== Maintenance ===
NYCHA's job is to create public housing for low income families while also giving them free maintenance, cleaning and heating. Residents of the Farragut Houses have made a large number of complaints and maintenance repair requests, especially during winter. The reason for increased winter complaints is that the outdated buildings are causing problems with piping and heating, causing harsh living conditions for residents. For instance, on August 16, 2013, the Farragut Houses had 4,034 unanswered repair requests, with complaints ranging from difficulties closing doors to mold growing in bathrooms. In response, Mayor Bill de Blasio unveiled proposals to fix these problems. However, at the same time, De Blasio planned to also cut NYCHA's budget.

== Community garden ==
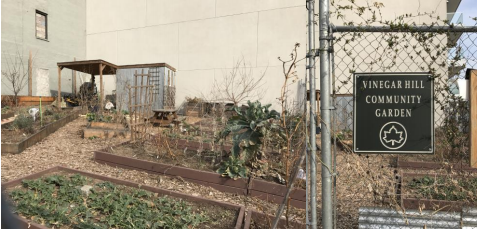
Vinegar Hill Community Garden

Vinegar Hill Community Garden, located on York Street, was built as part of the Gardens for Healthy Communities program in 2013. The 2,500-square-foot (230 m^{2}) garden includes more than ten raised beds for growing vegetables, a rainwater harvesting system, shed, and seating. Members of the community and students from nearby PS 307 work in the garden.

== Notable residents ==
- Candida Alvarez
- Janet McDonald

== See also ==
- List of New York City Housing Authority properties
