= Brooklyn Community Board 2 =

Brooklyn Community District 2
- Community District
- Country: United States
- State: New York
- City: New York City
- Borough: Brooklyn
- Neighborhoods: List: Boerum Hill; Brooklyn Heights; Clinton Hill; Downtown Brooklyn; DUMBO; Fulton Ferry; Fort Greene; Brooklyn Navy Yard; Vinegar Hill

Government
  - Chairperson: Lenue H. Singletary III
  - District Manager: Vacant

Area
  - Total: 2.8 sq mi (7.3 km^{2})

Population (2020)
  - Total: 130,021 ▲
  - Density: 46,000/sq mi (18,000/km^{2})

Ethnicity
  - White: 48.2%
  - Black: 19.2%
  - Hispanic and Latino (any race): 13.1%
  - Asian: 12.8%
  - Others: 6.6%
- Time zone: UTC−5 (Eastern)
  - Summer (DST): UTC−4 (EDT)
- ZIP codes: 11201, 11205, 11217, 11238, and 11251
- Area code: 718, 347, 929, and 917
- Police Precincts: 84th (website); 88th (website)
- Website: www1.nyc.gov/site/brooklyncb2/index.page

Brooklyn Community Board 2 is a New York City community board that encompasses the Brooklyn neighborhoods of Downtown Brooklyn, Brooklyn Heights, DUMBO, Vinegar Hill, Fulton Mall, Boerum Hill, Fort Greene, Brooklyn Navy Yard, Fulton Ferry, and Clinton Hill. It is delimited by the East River on the west and the north, by Kent and Classon Avenues on the east, and by Atlantic Avenue, Pacific Street, Fourth Avenue, Warren, and Court Streets on the south.

As of the United States Census, 2000, the Community Board had a population of 98,620, up from 94,534 in 1990 and 92,732 in 1980. 39,916 (40.5%) residents were African-American, 33,931 (34.4%) were White non-Hispanic, 4,629 (4.7%) were Asian or Pacific Islander, 213 (0.2%) were American Indian or Native Alaskan, 473 (0.5%) were of some other race, 2,923 (3%) were of two or more races, and 16,535 (16.8%) were of Hispanic origins.

In 2004, 17.4% of the population benefited from public assistance, a decrease from 22.5% in 2000.

The land area is 1,910.1 acres (7.730 km^{2}).

The community board's chairperson is Lenue H. Singletary III.

== Demographics ==
Historical population
Census	Pop.	Note	%±
1980	92,732		—
1990	94,534		1.9%
2000	98,620		4.3%
2010	99,617		1.0%
2020	130,021		30.5%
U.S. Decennial Census

Population by race as of 2000, 2010 and 2020 censuses:
Race	2000		2010		2020	
White	33,931	34.40%	45,970	46.12%	62,700	48.22%
Black	39,916	40.47%	27,921	28.01%	25,029	19.25%
Asian	4,629	4.69%	7,792	7.82%	16,669	12.82%
Other	686	0.64%	633	0.63%	1,380	1.06%
Multiracial	2,923	2.96%	3,130	3.14%	7,207	5.54%
Hispanic (any race)	16,535	16.76%	14,171	14.22%	17,036	13.10%
Total	98,620	100%	99,617	100%	130,021	100%

The total population of district 2 is now 102,814; 46% are White, 27% are African American, 14% are Hispanic, 8% are Asian, and 4% are other. The majority of the population is young; 44% are 25–44 years old, 20% are 45–64, 15% are 0–17, 10% are 18–24, and 11% are over 65. Overall, this district had a population of 94,534 residents in 1990, 98,620 in 2000, and 99,617 in 2010.

According to New York City Fact Finder, showing the average distribution of the population in the area Dumbo-Vinegar Hill-Downtown Brooklyn-Boerum between 2009 and 2013, the predominant race is White, followed by Hispanic, African American, and Asian. The White population within this time frame was 16,231, which represents 43.3% of the total number of people living in this area.

The Hispanic population represented 23%, as there were about 8,609 people of this category between 2009-2013 in this neighborhood. African American is the next racial category represented in this zone in the same time frame mentioned above. There were 8,141 African Americans in District 2 which represents 21.7% of this population. The race least represented in this area is Asian. There were 3,298 Asians in this neighborhood between 2009 and 2013.

The greatest percentage in Dumbo-Vinegar Hill-Downtown Brooklyn-Boerum is represented by a young population between 25 and 34 years old, which was 17.3% of the total population between 2009 – 2013, followed by the age category 35-44 in a proportion of 14.1%. The next age group in this neighborhood was 45-54 present in a proportion of 13.4%. Residents 84 years and older were present in a proportion of only 1.8%.

In 2000 the total population of District 2 was 98,620; in 1990 the population was 94,534, and in 1980 it was 92,732 (US Census Bureau). There has been substantial increase in the number of people living in this neighborhood. The greatest number of the population in this area between 1990 and 2000 was represented by African Americans, followed by Whites, and Asians. There were 44,670 African Americans in District 2 in 1990 and 39,916 of them in 2000. The next represented race in District 2 in between 1990 and 2000 is White. There were 30,144 Whites in 1990, 33,931 in 2000. There were 2,787 Asians in 1990 and 4,629 in 2000 present in District 2. The rest of the races were represented in a small number in this period in District 2.

In 1990 the population density of Census Tract 23 that included Farragut Houses residents was 73,063.4. Of note, Census 23 was delimited by York Street, Prospect Street, Nassau Street, and Navy Street. The total population in 1990 for Tract 23 was 5,106). In 1980 the density of the population in Census Tract 23 that included Farragut Houses residents was 69,627.3 with a total of 4,950.

Back in 1970 Census Tract 23 which also included Farragut Houses residents had a population density of 73,594.4 with a total of 5,232. 1960 Census Tract 23 shows that this included Farragut Houses residents, who had a population density of 144,700.18 with a total of 6621 inhabitants.

Before Farragut Houses were built in 1952, massive demolition took place in what is today called the Vinegar Hills area. In 1950 the population density of Census Tract 23 was 28,798.9 with a total of 1,745. Ten years previously, in 1940, the population density of Census Tract 23 was 26,619.98 with a total of 13,138. This means that more than 11,000 people had to leave their homes and move away.

== Economic status ==
Fifty-six percent of the residents in Dumbo-Vinegar Hill-Downtown Brooklyn-Boerum 16 years and older were unemployed between 2009 and 2013. From the working population, 38% were holding jobs in management, business, science, and arts, 26% educational services, and health care and social assistance 23% sales and office positions.

The average income in Dumbo-Vinegar Hill-Downtown Brooklyn-Boerum between 2009 and 2013 was less than $10,000 for 7.3% of residents, between $10,000 and $14,000 for 5.0%, and about $15,000-$24,000 for 10.3%. Nine and a half percent of inhabitants in this area made between $25,000 and $34,999 during 2009-2013. Incomes of approximately $35,000- $49,999 were earned by 12.2% residents, and $50,000-$74,999 represented annual wages for 15.7% of the people in this neighborhood.

About 11.4% of residents living in Dumbo-Vinegar Hill-Downtown Brooklyn-Boerum had annual wages between $75,000 and $99,999 from 2009 to 2013 and 13.9% of them made $100,000-$149,999. People with incomes greater than $200,000 comprised 8.2% of the population and 6.3% of the residents had annual wages between $150,000 and $199,999 in the same time period. In 2000, the annual income in District 2 had the highest mean $112,414 and the lowest mean was $9,876.

== Religion ==
Only 51.58% of people who live in District 2 belong to a religious group. The religion best represented in District 2 is Catholicism at 25.54%, followed by Judaism at 11.51%, Pentecostalism at 11.1%, and Islam at 3.8%. Less represented religions are Methodist (0.79%), Episcopalian (0.65%), LDS (The Church of Jesus Christ of the Latter Days -0.36%), and Eastern Orthodox Christian Church (0.18%).
