= List of Brooklyn neighborhoods =

Neighborhoods of Brooklyn

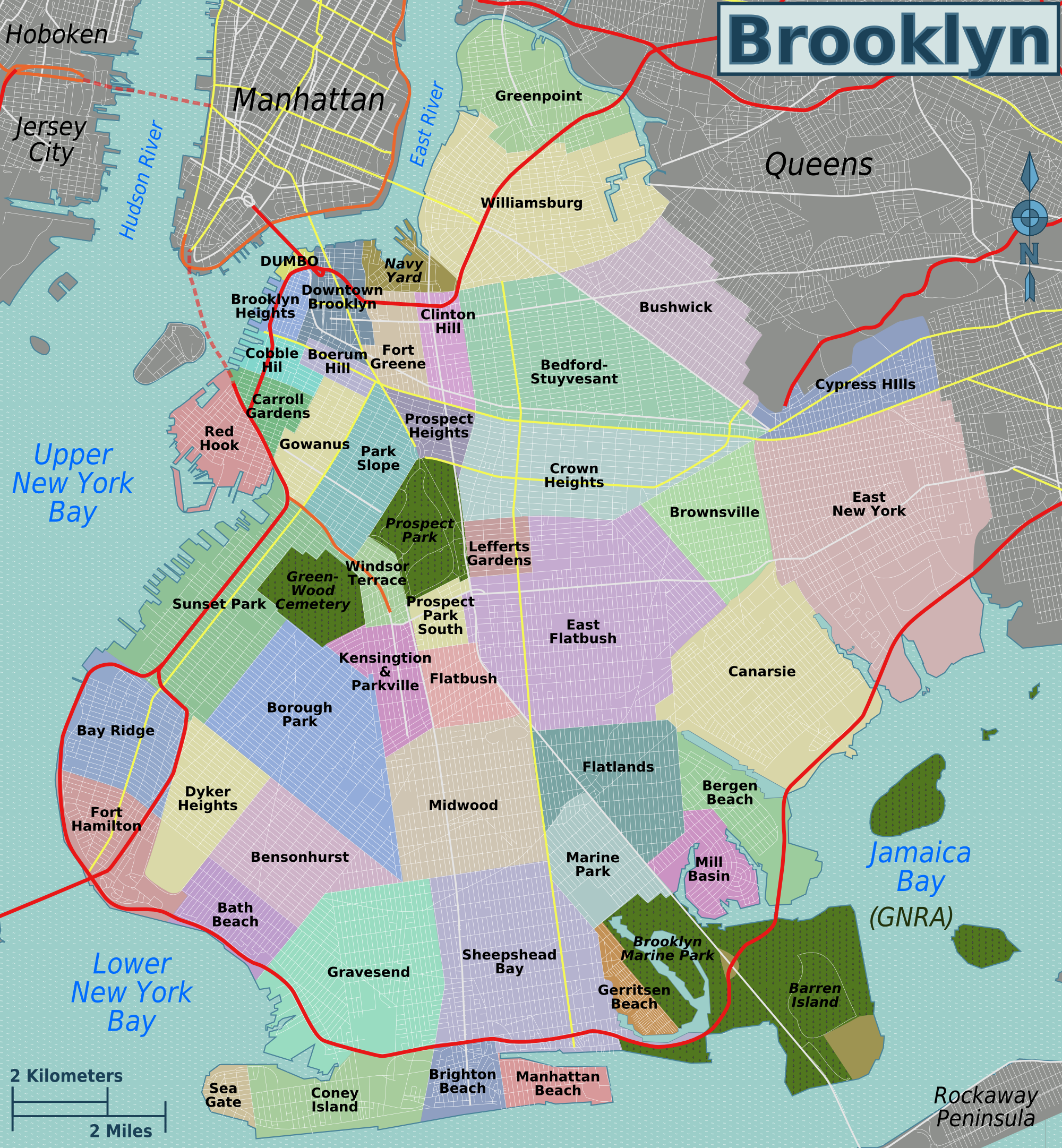
The neighborhood boundaries on this map are only approximate.

This is a list of neighborhoods in Brooklyn, one of the five boroughs of New York City, United States.

== By geographical region ==
=== Central Brooklyn ===
- Crown Heights
  - Weeksville
- Flatbush
  - Beverley Squares: Beverley Square East, Beverley Square West
  - Ditmas Park
  - East Flatbush
    - Farragut
    - Remsen Village
  - Fiske Terrace
  - Pigtown
  - Wingate
- Prospect Park area
  - Prospect Lefferts Gardens
  - Prospect Park South
  - Windsor Terrace
- Kensington
  - Ocean Parkway
  - Parkville

=== Eastern Brooklyn ===
- Brownsville
- Canarsie
- East New York
  - City Line
  - Cypress Hills
  - New Lots
  - Spring Creek
  - Starrett City
  - Highland Park

=== Northern Brooklyn ===
- Bedford–Stuyvesant
  - Bedford
  - Ocean Hill
  - Stuyvesant Heights
- Bushwick
  - Wyckoff Heights
- Greenpoint
  - Little Poland
- Williamsburg
  - East Williamsburg
  - Southside
  - South Williamsburg

=== Northwestern Brooklyn ===
- Brooklyn Heights
- Brooklyn Navy Yard
  - Admiral's Row
- Cadman Plaza
- Clinton Hill
- Downtown Brooklyn
  - Bridge Plaza/RAMBO
- DUMBO
  - Fulton Ferry
- Fort Greene
- Prospect Heights
  - Pacific Park/Atlantic Yards
- Vinegar Hill
- South Brooklyn – takes its name from the geographical position of the original town of Brooklyn, which today includes the neighborhoods listed above under the heading "northwestern Brooklyn." It is not located in the southern part of the modern borough.
  - Boerum Hill
  - Carroll Gardens
    - Columbia Street Waterfront District
  - Cobble Hill
  - Gowanus
  - Park Slope
    - South Park Slope
    - Greenwood Heights
    - Park Slope Village
  - Red Hook

=== Southern Brooklyn ===
- Barren Island
- Bergen Beach and Georgetown
- Coney Island
  - Brighton Beach, also known as "Little Odessa" or "Little Russia"
    - West Brighton
  - Manhattan Beach
  - Sea Gate
- Sheepshead Bay and Madison
  - Homecrest
- Midwood
- Flatlands
- Gerritsen Beach
- Gravesend
  - White Sands
- Marine Park
- Mill Basin
- Plumb Beach

=== Southwestern Brooklyn ===
The southwestern portion of Brooklyn shares numbered streets and avenues starting from 36th Street to 101st Street and from 1st Avenue to 25th Avenue, passing through the neighborhoods listed below:

- Bay Ridge
  - Fort Hamilton
- Bensonhurst
  - Bath Beach
  - New Utrecht
- Borough Park
  - Mapleton lies mostly in Borough Park but its southern reaches are within Bensonhurst
- Dyker Heights
- Sunset Park
  - Chinatown

== By historical town ==
The original Dutch settlement of what is now Brooklyn consisted of six towns with clearly defined borders. These later became English settlements, and were consolidated over time until the entirety of Kings County was the unified City of Brooklyn. The towns were, clockwise from the north: Bushwick, Brooklyn, Flatlands, Gravesend, New Utrecht, with Flatbush in the middle. The modern neighborhoods bearing these names are located roughly in the center of each of these original towns. Certain portions of the original six towns were also independent municipalities for a time, before being reabsorbed.

Following an 1894 referendum, the entire consolidated City of Brooklyn became a borough of New York City in 1898.

=== Bushwick ===
Annexed to Brooklyn in 1854.

- Bushwick
- Greenpoint
- Williamsburg (separated from Bushwick in 1840, annexed to Brooklyn in 1854)

=== Brooklyn ===
- Bedford–Stuyvesant
- Boerum Hill
- Brooklyn Heights
- Brownsville
- Carroll Gardens
- City Line
- Clinton Hill
- Cobble Hill
- Crown Heights
- Cypress Hills
- Downtown Brooklyn
- DUMBO
- East New York
- Fort Greene
- Gowanus
- Greenwood Heights
- Highland Park
- New Lots (separated from Flatbush in 1852, annexed to Brooklyn in 1886)
- Ocean Hill
- Park Slope
- Prospect Heights
- RAMBO
- Spring Creek
- Starrett City
- Stuyvesant Heights
- Sunset Park
- Vinegar Hill
- Weeksville
- Windsor Terrace
- Wingate

=== Flatlands ===
Annexed to Brooklyn in 1896.

- Bergen Beach
- Canarsie
- Flatlands
- Georgetown
- Marine Park
- Midwood (SE Quarter)
- Mill Basin

=== Gravesend ===
Annexed to Brooklyn in 1894.

- Brighton Beach
- Coney Island
- Gerritsen Beach
- Gravesend
- Homecrest
- Madison
- Midwood
- Manhattan Beach
- Plum Beach
- Seagate
- Sheepshead Bay

=== New Utrecht ===
Annexed to Brooklyn in 1894.

- Bath Beach
- Bay Ridge
- Bensonhurst
- Borough Park
- Dyker Heights
- Mapleton
- New Utrecht

=== Flatbush ===
Annexed to Brooklyn in 1894.

- Ditmas Park
- East Flatbush
- Farragut
- Fiske Terrace
- Flatbush
- Kensington
- Prospect Lefferts Gardens
- Prospect Park South

== See also ==
- List of Bronx neighborhoods
- List of Manhattan neighborhoods
- List of Queens neighborhoods
- List of Staten Island neighborhoods
