= Park Slope Village =

Housing development in Brooklyn, New York

- Neighborhood of Brooklyn
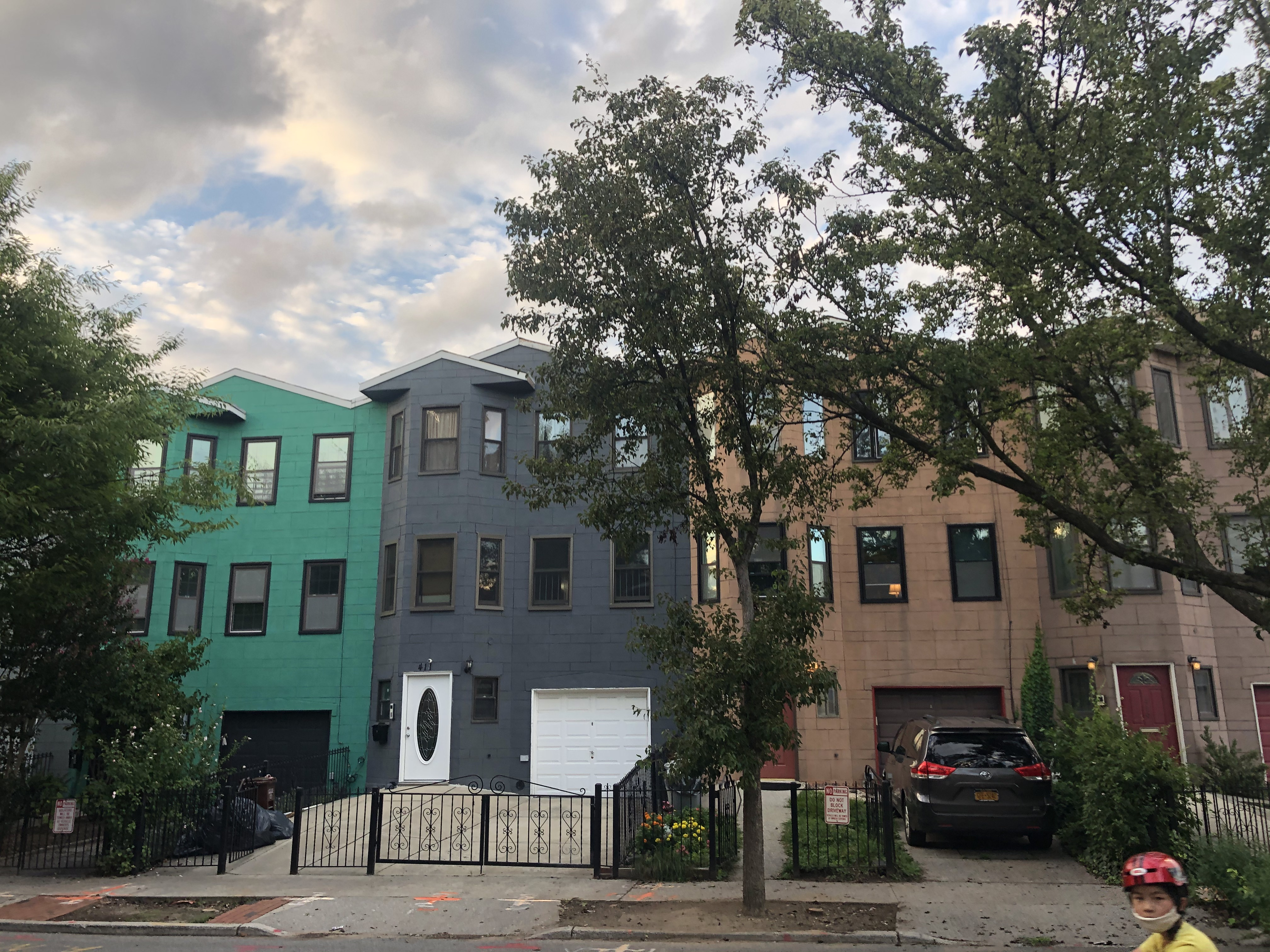
- Location in New York City
- Coordinates: 40.679469°N 73.980066°W
- Country: United States
- State: New York
- City: New York City
- Borough: Brooklyn
- Community District: Brooklyn 6

Park Slope Village is a housing development in the northwestern section of Park Slope, Brooklyn, bordering Gowanus to the west. It was developed by the Fifth Avenue Committee, and built by the Urban Housing Association as part of a 1982 urban renewal project. Construction of the 55 three-unit townhouses was completed in 1986.

The distinct pitched roof-line of the townhouses was inspired by the architectural features of the original, now demolished, P.S. 133, which stood in the center of the neighborhood.

== History ==
Park Slope Village was built on a section of condemned land, once known as the Baltic Street Lot. The infamous vacant lot was the result of a 1968 proposal from the Board of Education that called for the clearing of 6.5 acres (2.6 ha) surrounding P.S. 133 to make room for the construction of an "educational park." It was to include a new elementary and intermediate school.

By 1970, 200 units of housing, two factories (Crayola and Lovely Dolls), and a number of warehouses on this land had been razed. This left an almost completely vacant lot stretching between Fifth to Fourth Avenue, from Baltic across Butler and halfway to Douglass Street. The only building left standing on the large barren lot was the school. At this time it was sometimes referred to as "The Little School on the Prairie" by locals.

Due to the financial crisis of 1975, the lot would remain empty for several years. It wasn't until the early 1980s that the Fifth Avenue Committee would propose a mixed-use plan for the 6.5 acre vacant lot. This plan would lead to the construction of Park Slope Village, as well as a 27,500 square foot Key Food supermarket with parking for 120 cars.

The parking lot terminated the connection between Butler Street and Fifth Avenue. This led to the creation of Gregory Place, connecting Butler and Baltic Streets. Gregory Place would later be renamed "Quisenbury Drive" after Dorothy Quisenbury, who was president of the Fifth Avenue Committee and the driving force behind the construction of Park Slope Village.

In 2022 the Key Food at 120 Fifth Avenue was demolished and the property is currently being redeveloped by the William Macklowe Company and Senlac Ridge Partners.

== Redevelopment ==
Plans for the mixed-use complex at 120 Fifth Avenue includes a "public piazza," which will reopen Butler Street to Fifth Avenue, but only to pedestrians. The connecting of Park Slope Village to Fifth Avenue will likely have major impacts on the modest neighborhood. Estimated completion of the project is 2024

On the other side of Butler Street, seeds of redevelopment were planted as far back as 2003, when Fourth Avenue was rezoned, allowing for much taller buildings. In 2009, the City Council voted to tear down the original 300-seat P.S. 133, designed by C. B. J. Snyder, and replace it with a new 960-seat "state-of-the-art" elementary school. SBLM Architects designed the new school with elements that recall the Flemish Renaissance style, to pay homage to the original structure.

In 2016 a permit was filed for the demolition of a Park Slope Village townhouse on the corner of Butler Street and Fourth Avenue (344 Butler), with development plans for an upscale eight-story building with 11 residential units. Four years later, permits were filed for the demolition of three more townhouses in the adjacent lots, to be replaced by a twelve-story, 32-unit luxury apartment building. The two new additions to Park Slope Village are called The Butler Collection.
