= Bridge Plaza, Brooklyn =

Neighborhood in New York City

Coordinates: 40°41′48″N 73°58′59″W

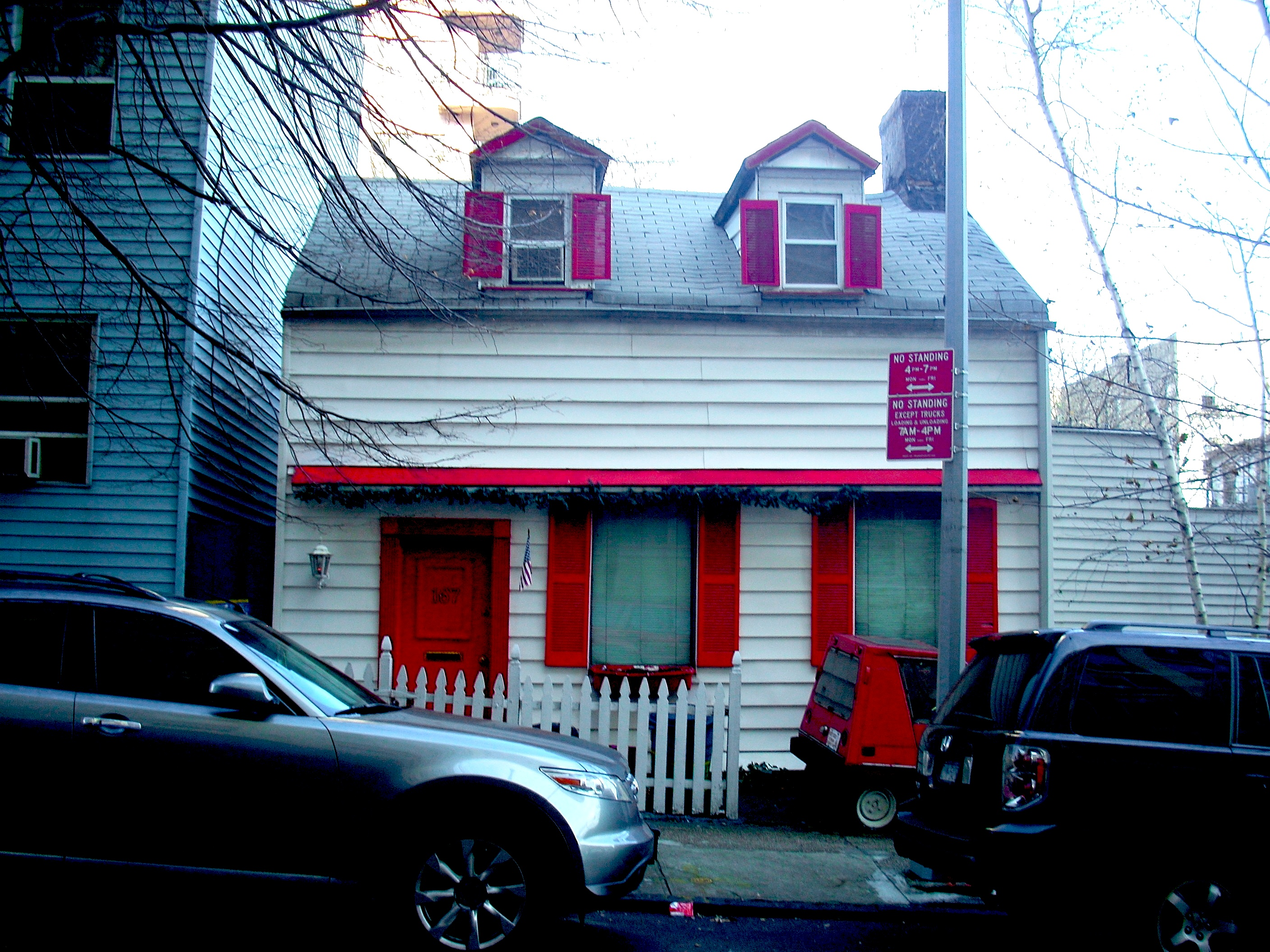
167 Concord Street

Bridge Plaza is the northeastern corner of the downtown area of the New York City borough of Brooklyn. Its borders are Flatbush Avenue Extension and Manhattan Bridge on the west, Tillary Street on the south, and the Brooklyn–Queens Expressway (BQE) on the north and east.

The neighborhood was connected to Vinegar Hill until the 1950s, when construction of the BQE effectively isolated it from surrounding areas. Following this change, the "area shifted more towards auto shops, garages and warehouses, and its zoning only allowed industrial uses." Brooklyn real estate blog Brownstoner describes the area as "a time warp, a Brigadoon-like enclave of early to mid-19th century buildings surrounded by the boom of the 21st century."

The name RAMBO, an acronym for "Right Around the Manhattan Bridge Overpass", is sometimes applied to the area, though it is largely unpopular and derided.

== Notable home ==
One of the most notable homes in Bridge Plaza is 167 Concord Street, called the "most photogenic house in Downtown Brooklyn" by the Brooklyn Eagle. The miniature house features a candy apple red Citicar parked in the front yard. The cottage was built in 1762 and was surrounded by a stone wall dating to about 1820.
