= Downtown Brooklyn =

Central business district in New York City

- Neighborhood and central business district
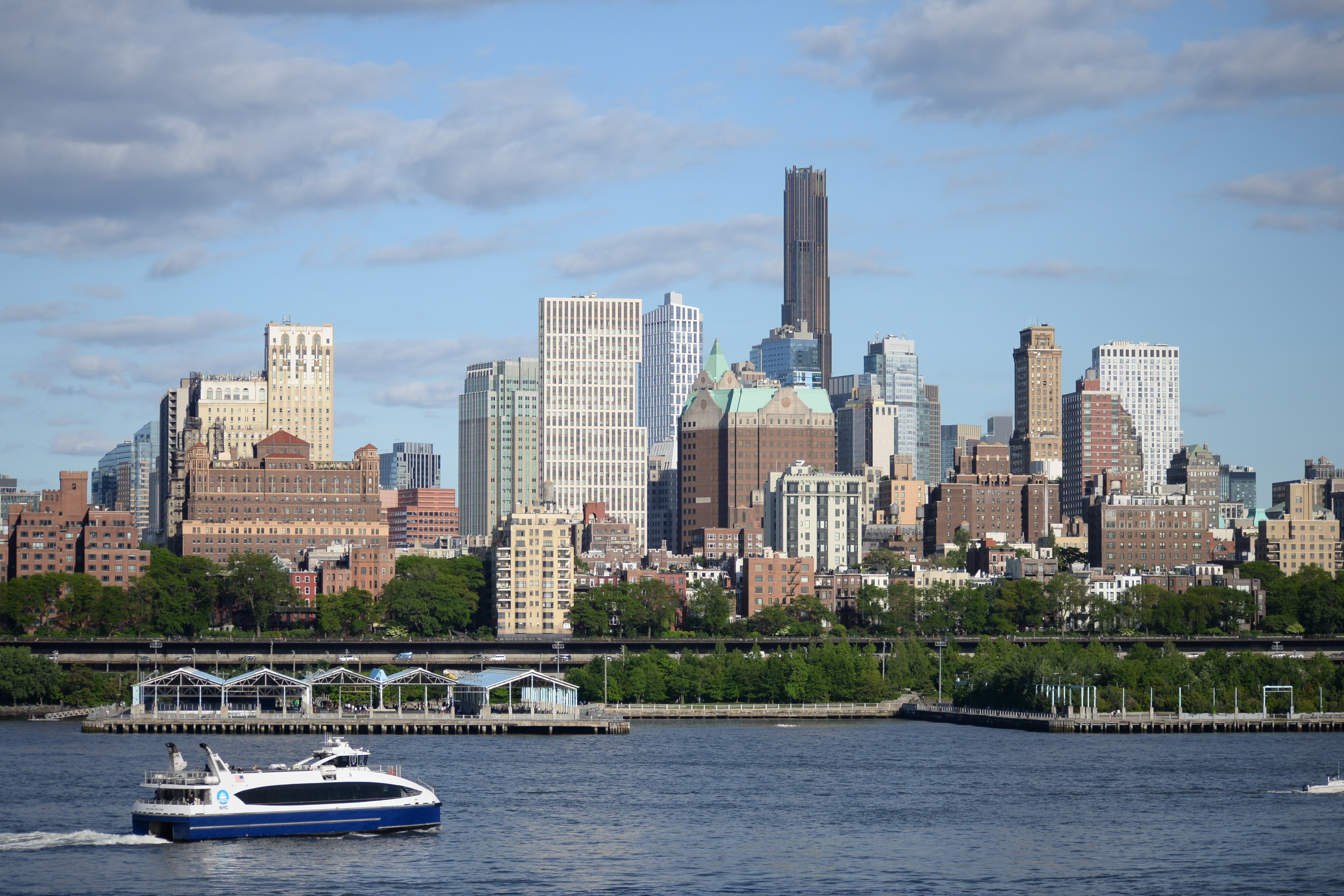
- Skyline of Downtown Brooklyn seen from Lower Manhattan
- Interactive map of Downtown Brooklyn
- Coordinates: 40°41′38″N 73°59′14″W
- Country: United States
- State: New York
- City: New York City
- Borough: Brooklyn
- Community District: Brooklyn 2

Area
  - Total: 0.433 sq mi (1.12 km^{2})

Population (2020)
  - Total: 23,493
  - Density: 54,300/sq mi (20,900/km^{2})

Economics
  - Median income: $110,436
- Time zone: UTC−5 (Eastern)
  - Summer (DST): UTC−4 (EDT)
- Zip Codes: 11201, 11217
- Area code: 718, 347, 929, and 917

Downtown Brooklyn is the third-largest central business district in New York City (after Midtown and Lower Manhattan), and is located in the northwestern section of the borough of Brooklyn. The neighborhood is known for its office and residential buildings, such as several of Brooklyn's tallest buildings and the MetroTech Center office complex.

Since the rezoning of Downtown Brooklyn in 2004, the area has been undergoing a transformation, with $9 billion of private investment and $300 million in public improvements underway. The area is a growing hub for education. In 2017, New York University announced that it would invest over $500 million to renovate and expand the NYU Tandon School of Engineering and its surrounding Downtown Brooklyn-based campus.

Downtown Brooklyn is part of Brooklyn Community District 2 and its primary ZIP Codes are 11201 and 11217. It is patrolled by the 84th and 88th Precincts of the New York City Police Department.

== History ==
=== Early development ===
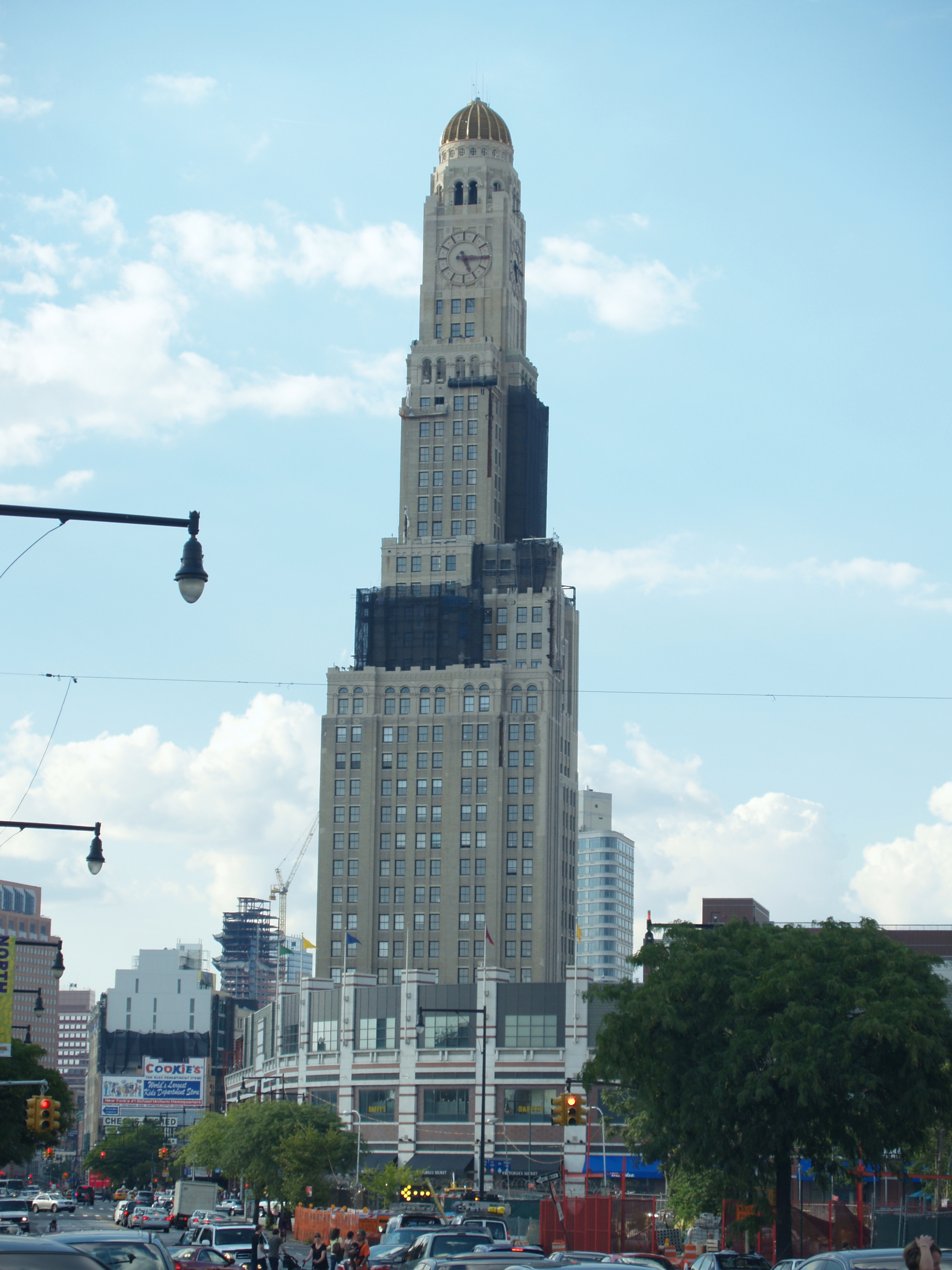
The Williamsburgh Savings Bank Tower, a prominent symbol of Downtown Brooklyn

This area was originally inhabited by Lenape Native Americans, until the 17th century. The area close to the Wallabout Bay was called Rinnegokonk. At that time the Dutch arrived, gained control of the land, and called it Breuckelen. The waterfront area being sold by Indians to Joris Jansen Rapelje, who used the land for farm purposes. Until 1814, Downtown Brooklyn and Brooklyn Heights remained sparsely populated. Robert Fulton's new steam ferry then began to offer an easy commuting option to and from downtown Manhattan. It made Brooklyn Heights Manhattan's first suburb, and put Downtown Brooklyn on its way to becoming a commercial center, and the heart of the City of Brooklyn.

The city was home to many prominent abolitionists at a time when most of New York was indifferent to slavery. Many Brooklyn churches agitated against legalized slavery in the 1850s and 1860s and some acted as safehouses as part of the Underground Railroad movement. Walt Whitman was fired from his job as a reporter at the Brooklyn Eagle due to his support for the Wilmot Proviso when he lived at Willoughby and Myrtle Avenues. A group of buildings at 223, 225, 227, 231, 233, and 235 Duffield Street, in addition to the African Wesleyan Methodist Episcopal Church located in MetroTech Center, were believed to be among the safehouses.

The middle 19th century growth of the Port of New York caused shipping to spill over into the City of Brooklyn; many buildings now used for other purposes were built as warehouses and factories. Manufacturing intensified with the building of the Brooklyn and Manhattan Bridges; buildings from that time include the 1915 Sperry Gyroscope Company building, now known as the Howard Building of the New York City College of Technology. New, extensive infrastructure served the Brooklyn Bridge trolleys.

=== 20th century ===
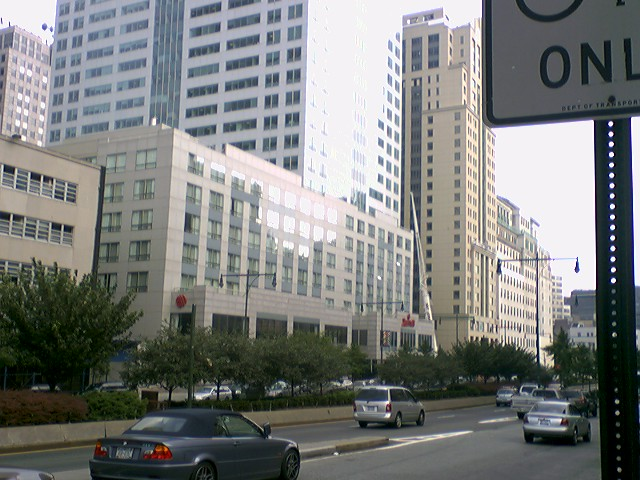
Adams Street/Brooklyn Bridge Boulevard, a major corridor through Downtown Brooklyn (2006)

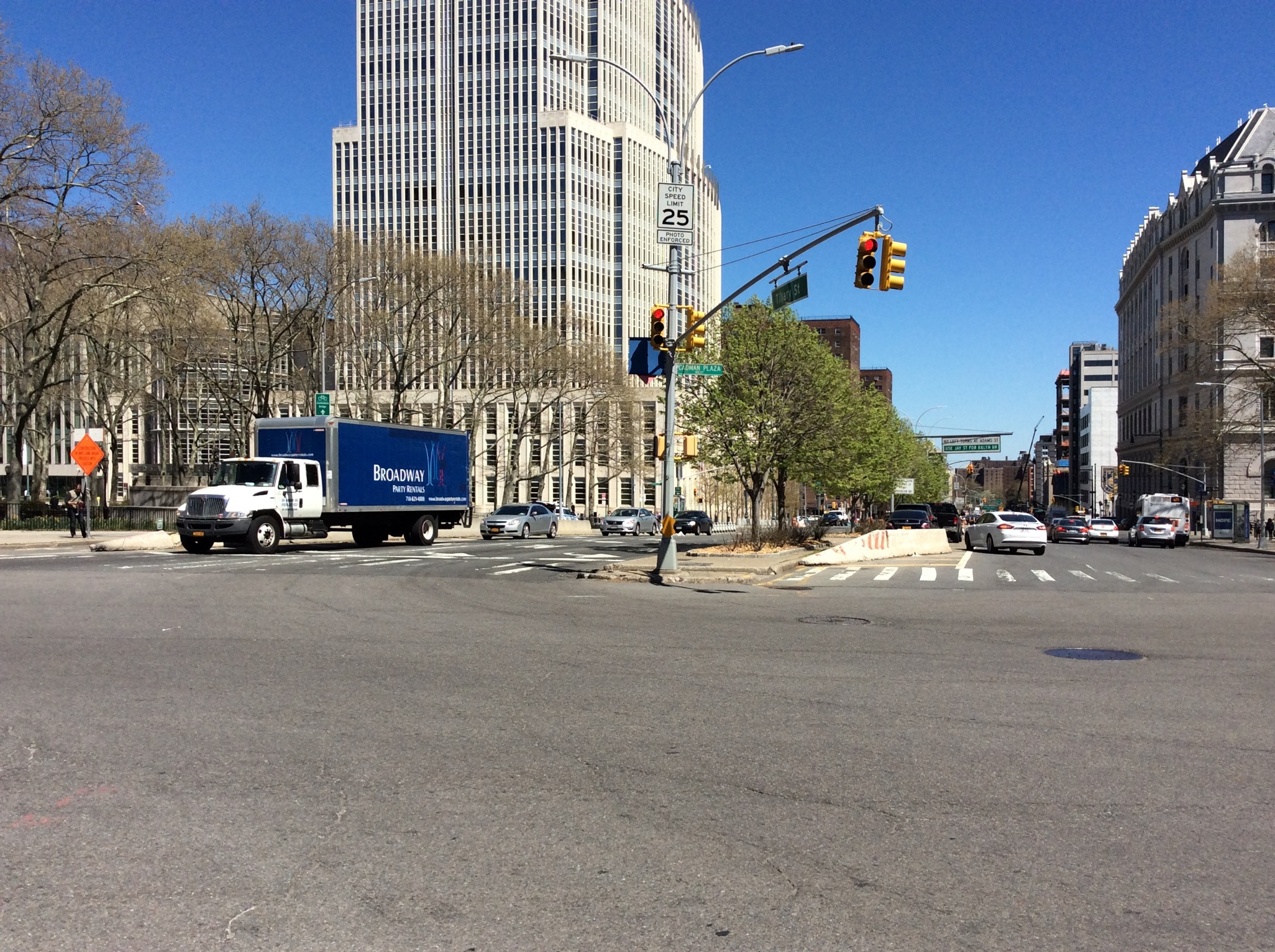
Tillary Street, another major corridor

Following World War II, the City Planning Commission, in conjunction with the Borough President's Office, presented and adopted a Master Plan for the Civic Center, which included an ambitious public improvements program. The program included plans for new buildings for City and State agencies, significant street widening and major housing construction in adjacent areas. A study conducted eight years later highlighted the progress made, emphasizing the widening of Adams Street (and later Boerum Place), which created a long and sweeping approach to Downtown Brooklyn from a modernized Brooklyn Bridge.

By the late 1960s, the patterns of transition that affected much of urban America initiated concern to protect the borough's Central Business District from deterioration. In 1969, a comprehensive plan for the entire city was completed and in the report the City Planning Commission stated, "Downtown Brooklyn's economy is vital to the borough and important to the entire metropolitan region." In reaffirming Downtown Brooklyn's central role and identifying its problems, the Plan was optimistic that a combination of public and private efforts would stimulate office and commercial construction. A 23-story privately financed office tower at Boerum Place and Livingston Street opened in 1971 and the anticipated growth of the Brooklyn Academy of Music (BAM) succeeded far beyond expectations, giving this cultural institution an important role as a symbolic anchor amid increasing decay during the following decade.

After suffering with the rest of New York through the fiscal crisis of the mid-1970s, Borough President Howard Golden, first elected in 1977, moved forward with a more aggressive economic development program to revitalize Downtown Brooklyn. He identified the need for greater equity in resource allocation between Manhattan and the city's other boroughs. An important moment in the history of Downtown Brooklyn came in 1983 with the release of a Regional Plan Association report for the area. According to the document, Downtown Brooklyn could become the city's third-largest business district because of its proximity to Lower Manhattan (closer by subway than Midtown). It also could serve as a prime location for high technology industries and new market-rate housing. The State Street Houses Historic District was listed on the National Register of Historic Places in 1980.

=== Rezoning ===
Historically, Downtown Brooklyn was primarily a commercial and civic center, with relatively little residential development. Housing included a few apartment buildings on Livingston Street, and seven 15-story buildings that make up the over 1,000 unit Concord Village co-op development on Adams Street, at the borders of both Brooklyn Heights and Dumbo.

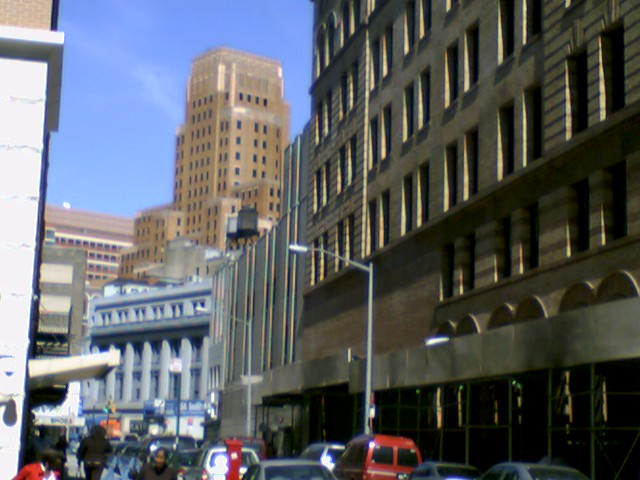
Lawrence Street in Downtown Brooklyn as seen in 2006

Since the rezoning of parts of Downtown Brooklyn in 2004 to allow for denser residential development, the area has seen the arrival of new condominium towers, townhouses, and office conversions. In all, 14,000 residential units were planned for Downtown Brooklyn at that time. A New York Sun article from November 7, 2007, reports on the arrival of Downtown Brooklyn as a 24/7 community, estimating that 35,000 residents will come to the area in the next five years. In January 2008, residents started moving into the new residential buildings, according to a New York Sun article. The New York City Department of City Planning approved another, significant rezoning for portions of Downtown Brooklyn, including the Fulton Mall area, which resulted in significant expansion of office space and ground-floor retail, such as those at City Point. The rezoning consists of "zoning map and zoning text changes, new public open spaces, pedestrian and transit improvements, urban renewal, [and] street mappings". The City Planning initiative also seeks to improve the connections between Downtown and the adjacent neighborhoods of Cobble Hill, Boerum Hill, and Fort Greene.

As of March 2012, the rezoning of Downtown Brooklyn had caused gentrification in nearby neighborhoods. Affordable housing was created in the area after the 2004 rezoning, with 420 affordable units in 2014. The housing increase has also resulted in positive effects on other aspects of Downtown Brooklyn's economy as well, with revenues for the area's hospitality industry having tripled since 2004. The increased residential development resulted in the growth of cultural institutions in the neighborhood as well.

Some of this gentrification was controversial, however. In 2007, the city government was to acquire the houses at 223–235 Duffield Street via eminent domain, then demolish the houses and replace them with 500 new hotel rooms, 1,000 units of mixed-income housing, more than 500,000 square feet of retail space, and at least 125,000 square feet of new office space in the area; however, only 231 Duffield Street was replaced by a hotel. Still, this caused historians to protest over the planned demolition of the historic houses because of their importance to abolitionists during the American Civil War.

== Institutions ==
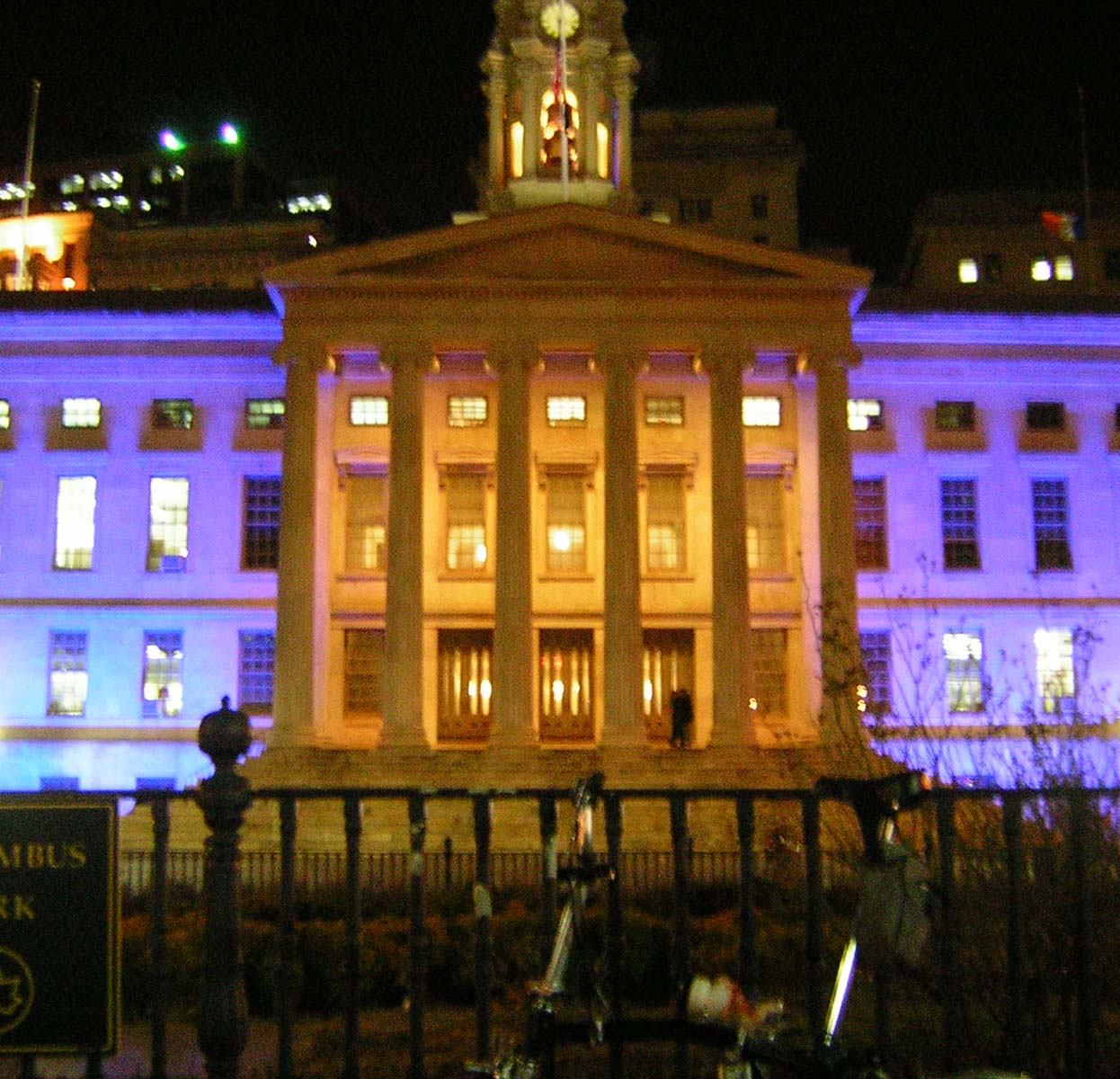
Brooklyn Borough Hall with holiday lighting

Downtown Brooklyn is the civic and commercial downtown center of the former City of Brooklyn, which, as of 2020, has more than 2.7 million residents. Alongside immediately adjacent neighborhoods, the general area encompasses Brooklyn Borough Hall, the Justice Ruth Bader Ginsburg Municipal Building, the Kings County New York State Courthouse and the Eastern District of New York's Theodore Roosevelt United States Courthouse. Attractions within the area include the Fulton Mall, the Brooklyn Academy of Music, the New York Transit Museum, and Barclays Center.

Three days a week the Borough Hall Greenmarket, featuring fresh produce from local farmers, operates on the plaza fronting Borough Hall. Formerly called Supreme Court Plaza, the location was renamed as Columbus Park in 1986.

=== Points of interest ===
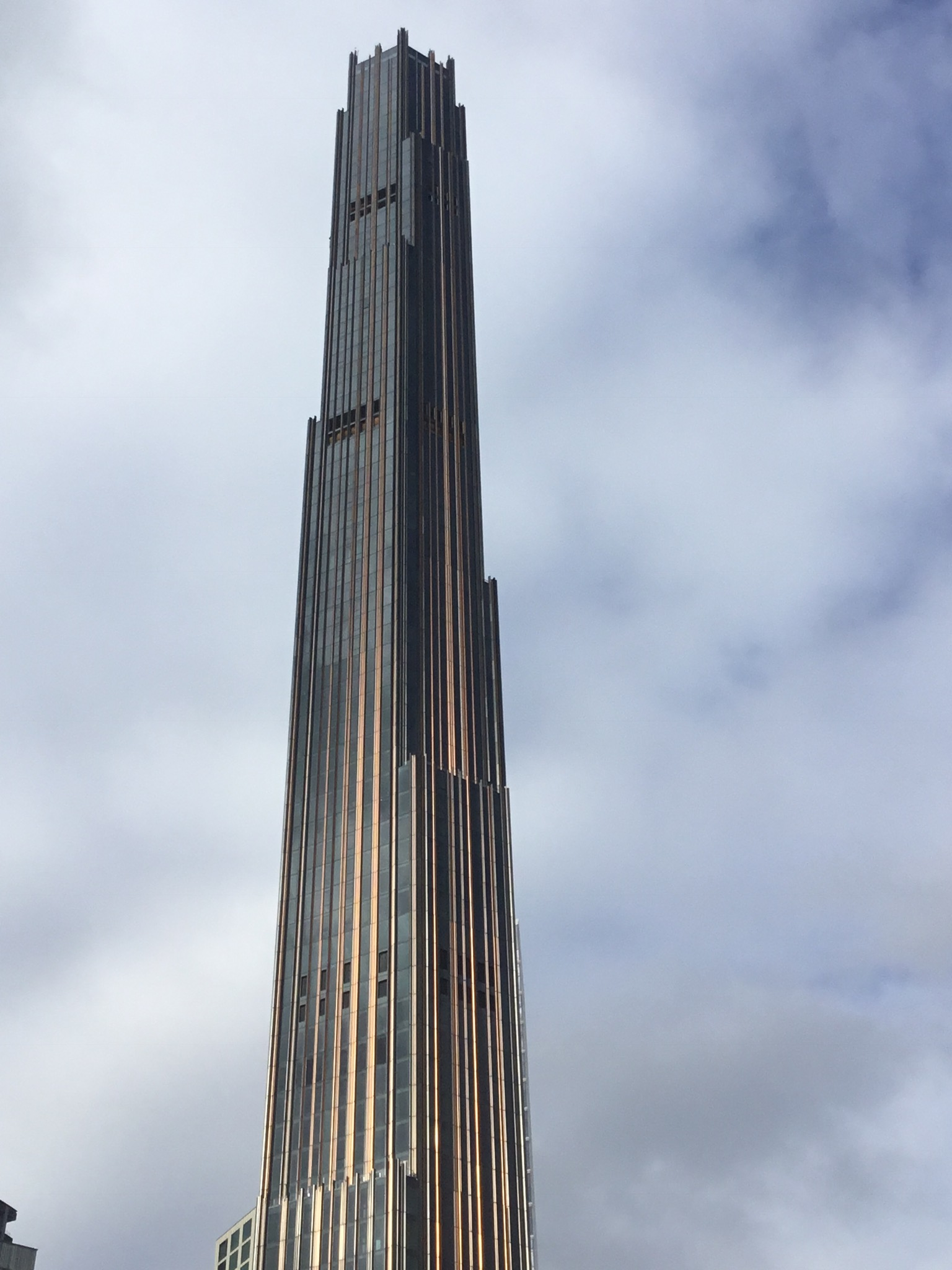
The Brooklyn Tower

MetroTech Center, a business and educational center, lies between Flatbush Avenue and Jay Street, above the Jay Street – MetroTech subway station, north of the Fulton Street Mall, and south of the busy Tillary Street.

The original location of Junior's, which was founded by Harry Rosen in 1950, is located at the corner of DeKalb Avenue and Flatbush Avenue Extension. The restaurant is 17,000 square feet of red-and-white-striped menus, flashbulb-adorned signs, rust-colored booths, and a wooden bar. A shrine to the Brooklyn of old, it has become a must-visit for politicians from borough presidents to President Barack Obama, who bought two cheesecakes and a couple of black-and-white cookies during an October 2013 visit with Bill de Blasio.

9 DeKalb Avenue is a residential skyscraper adjacent to the Dime Savings Bank of New York. Upon completion, it became the first supertall building in Brooklyn and the tallest structure in New York City outside of Manhattan.

Cadman Plaza Park, named for the historically prominent (and Brooklyn-based) liberal Protestant clergyman/broadcaster S. Parkes Cadman, provides 10 acres (40,000 m^{2}) of green space in the neighborhood, and was recently renovated by the New York City Parks Department. These and other parks form a long mall from Borough Hall to Brooklyn Bridge. A new park is also planned for the area, known as the Willoughby Square Park.

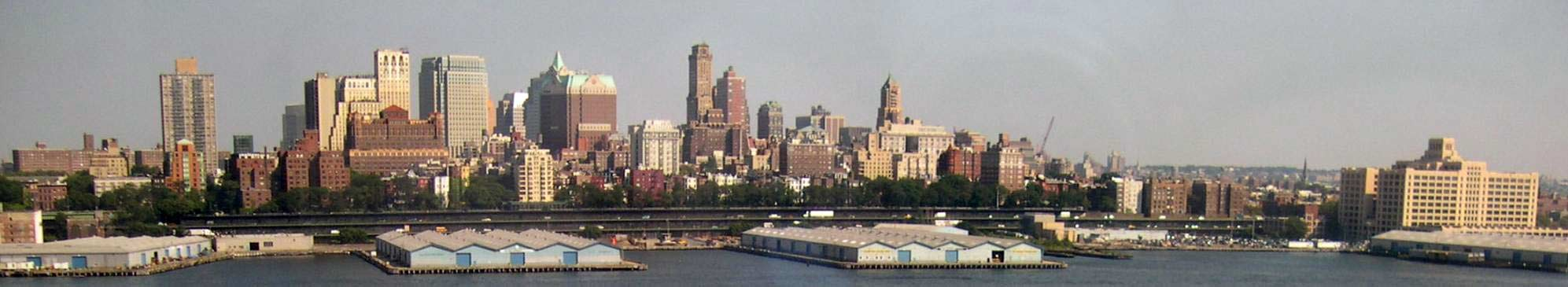
Panoramic view of the Downtown Brooklyn skyline

== Bridge Plaza ==
At the northeastern corner of Downtown Brooklyn is Bridge Plaza, bounded by Flatbush Avenue Extension and Manhattan Bridge on the west, Tillary Street on the south, and the Brooklyn-Queens Expressway (BQE) on the north and east. The newer term RAMBO, an acronym for Right Around The Manhattan Bridge Overpass is sometimes applied to the area, comparing it to DUMBO. The neighborhood was connected to Vinegar Hill until the 1950s, when construction of the BQE effectively isolated it from surrounding areas.

== Post office and ZIP Codes ==
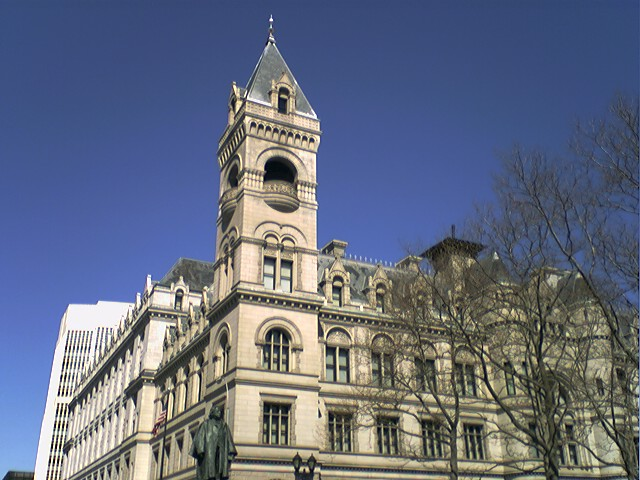
General Post Office and Federal Office Building, listed on the National Register of Historic Places

Downtown Brooklyn is served by two ZIP Codes: 11201 north of DeKalb Avenue and 11217 south of DeKalb Avenue. The United States Postal Service operates the Brooklyn Main Post Office at 271 Cadman Plaza East.

== Transportation ==
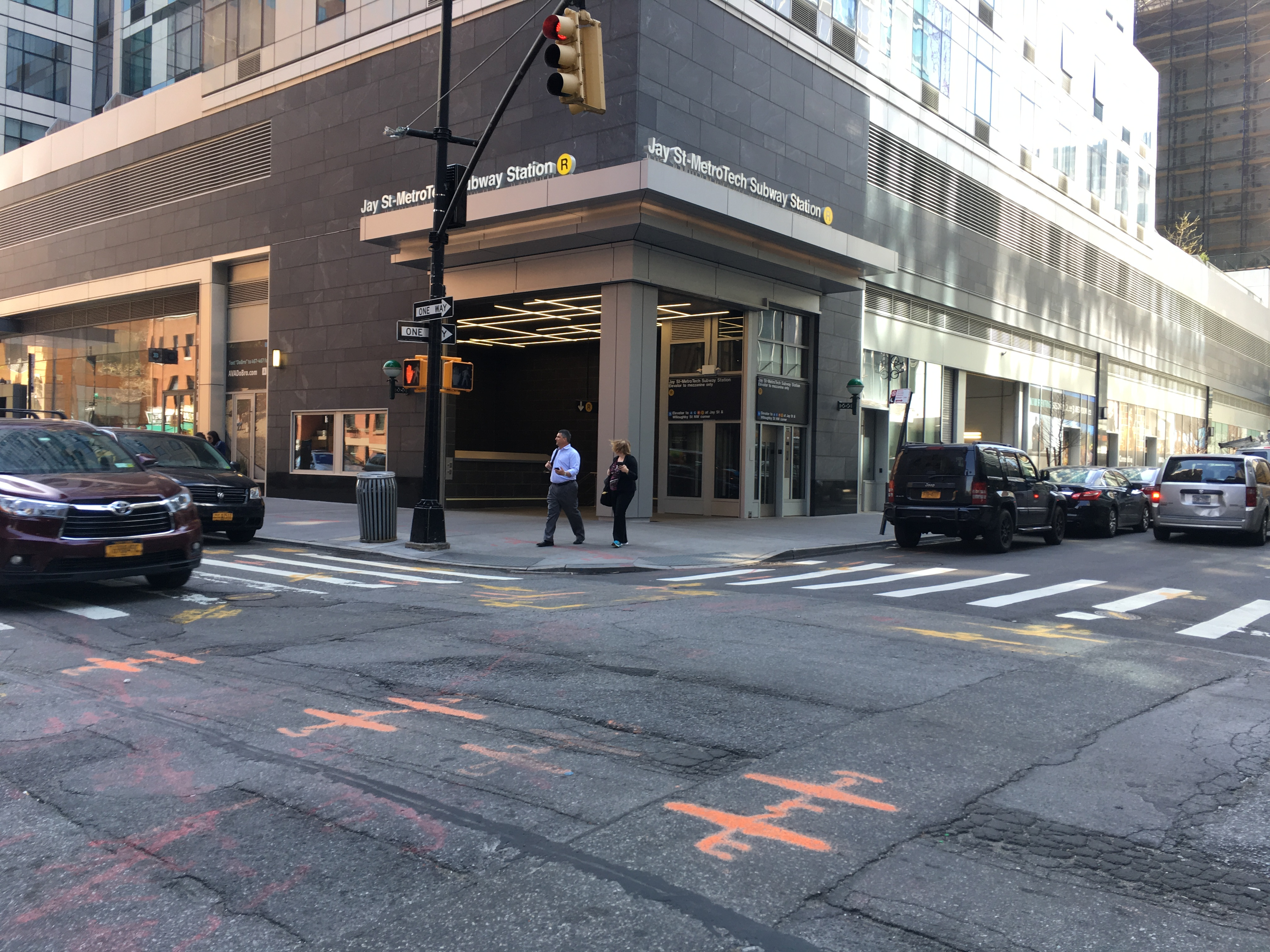
Jay Street–MetroTech station entrance in the AVA DoBro Building

Downtown Brooklyn is connected with Manhattan by the Brooklyn and Manhattan Bridges.

The neighborhood has extensive public transportation accessibility; it is served by the New York City Subway and many bus lines. All but one Manhattan trunk line in Lower Manhattan has a direct connection to Downtown Brooklyn. From south to north, the IRT Lexington Avenue Line (4 and 5 trains) via the Joralemon Street Tunnel, the BMT Broadway and BMT Nassau Street Lines (N, R, and W trains) via the Montague Street Tunnel, the IRT Broadway–Seventh Avenue Line (2 and 3 trains) via the Clark Street Tunnel and the IND Eighth Avenue Line (A and C trains) via the Cranberry Street Tunnel provide that service. Slightly farther north, the Manhattan Bridge (B, D, N, and Q trains) and Rutgers Street Tunnel (F and <F> trains) also feed subway trains from the Lower East Side into Downtown Brooklyn.

Major stations in the neighborhood are:

- Jay Street–MetroTech (A, C, F, <F>, N, R, and W trains)
- Court Street–Borough Hall (2, 3, 4, 5, N, R, and W trains)
- DeKalb Avenue (B, D, N, Q, R, and W trains)
- Hoyt–Schermerhorn Streets (A, C, and G trains)
- Nevins Street (2, 3, 4, and 5 trains)
- Atlantic Avenue–Barclays Center (2, 3, 4, 5, B, D, N, Q, R and W trains)

A $130 million capital project to connect Lawrence Street–MetroTech (N, R, and W trains) and Jay Street–Borough Hall (A, C, and F and <F> trains), which also included renovation of both stations, was completed on December 10, 2010. It features an underground corridor on Willoughby Street connecting both stations, which includes new escalator and elevator access to Lawrence Street.

The Long Island Rail Road stops at the Atlantic Terminal, located at the intersection of Atlantic and Flatbush Avenues.

== Education ==
Public schools are operated by the New York City Department of Education.

In 2021 the private school German School of Brooklyn moved all levels to its permanent site at 9 Hanover Place in Downtown Brooklyn. The Khalil Gibran International Academy High School opened in September 2024.

Schools situated within or in the immediate periphery of the district include Brooklyn Technical High School (one of the city's nine selective specialized high schools), Brooklyn Friends School, Bishop Loughlin Memorial High School, St. Francis College, St. Joseph's College, Brooklyn Law School, New York University's Tandon School of Engineering and Center for Urban Science and Progress, the New York City College of Technology, Adelphi University's Brooklyn Center, and Long Island University's LIU Brooklyn campus.

== See also ==
- List of tallest buildings in Brooklyn
