= State Street Houses =

Historic district in Brooklyn, New York

- U.S. National Register of Historic Places
- U.S. Historic district
- New York State Register of Historic Places
- New York City Landmark
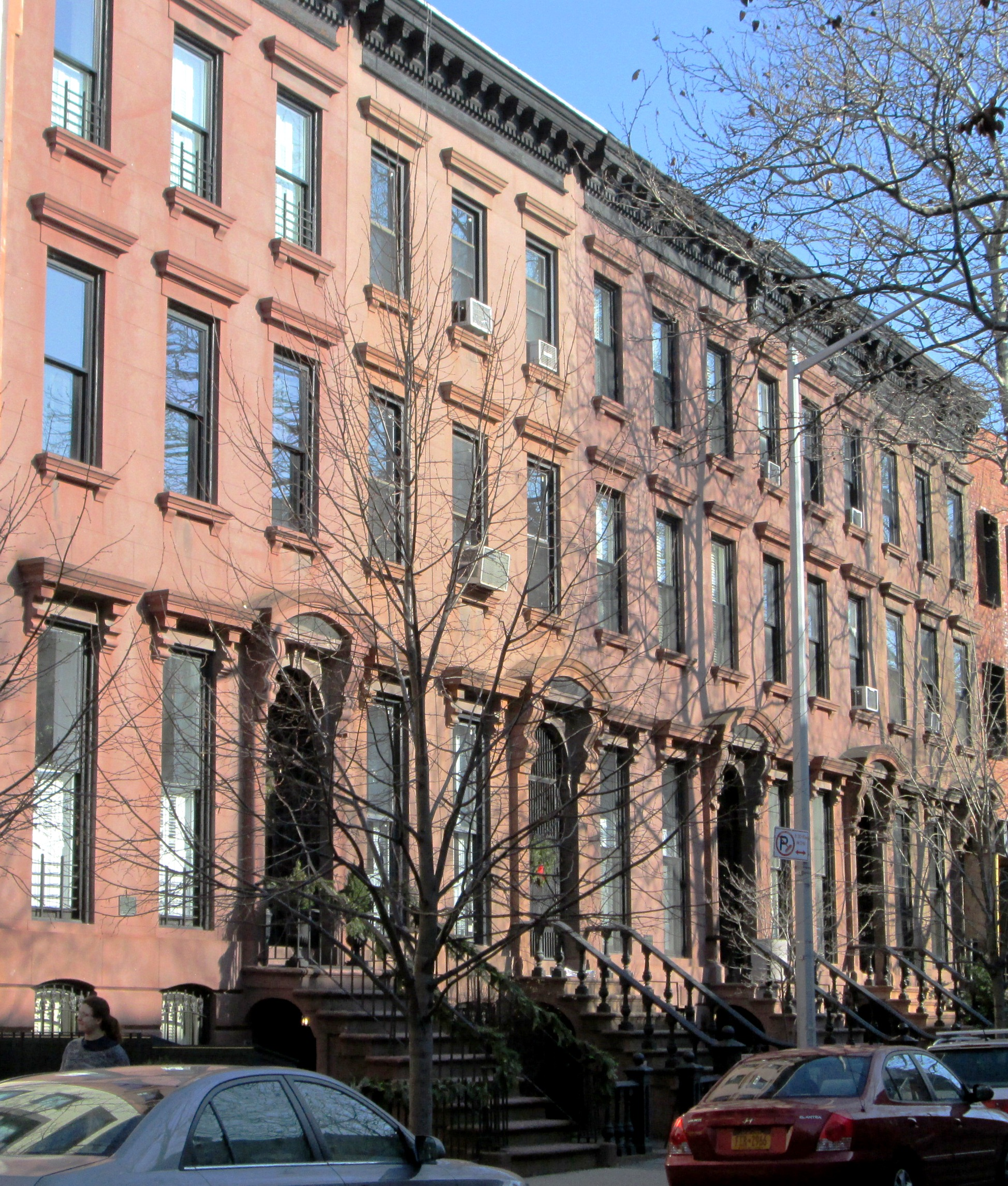
- 291-299 State Street (2013)

- Location within New York City Location within New York Location within the United States
- Location: 291-299 (odd) and 290-324 (even) State St. Brooklyn, New York City
- Coordinates: 40°41′19″N 73°59′16″W
- Area: 2 acres (0.81 ha)
- Built: 1847-1874
- Architectural style: Greek Revival, Italianate
- NRHP reference No.: 80002640
- NYCL No.: 0744–0766

Significant dates
- Added to NRHP: January 17, 1980
- Designated NYSRHP: June 23, 1980
- Designated NYCL: November 20, 1973

The State Street Houses are 23 Greek Revival and Italianate rowhouses built between 1847 and 1874 and located at 291-299 (odd) and 290-324 (even) State Street between Smith and Hoyt Streets in the Boerum Hill neighborhood of Brooklyn, New York City. The construction of the houses was part of the transformation of the formerly rural area into a fashionable new residential neighborhood.

The houses, which are three stories high on raised basements and feature the same cornice lines and similar window heights, were designated New York City landmarks in 1973, and are the contributing properties to a national historic district which was listed on the National Register of Historic Places in 1980.
