= Vinegar Hill, Brooklyn =

Neighborhood in New York City

Vinegar Hill
- Neighborhood of Brooklyn
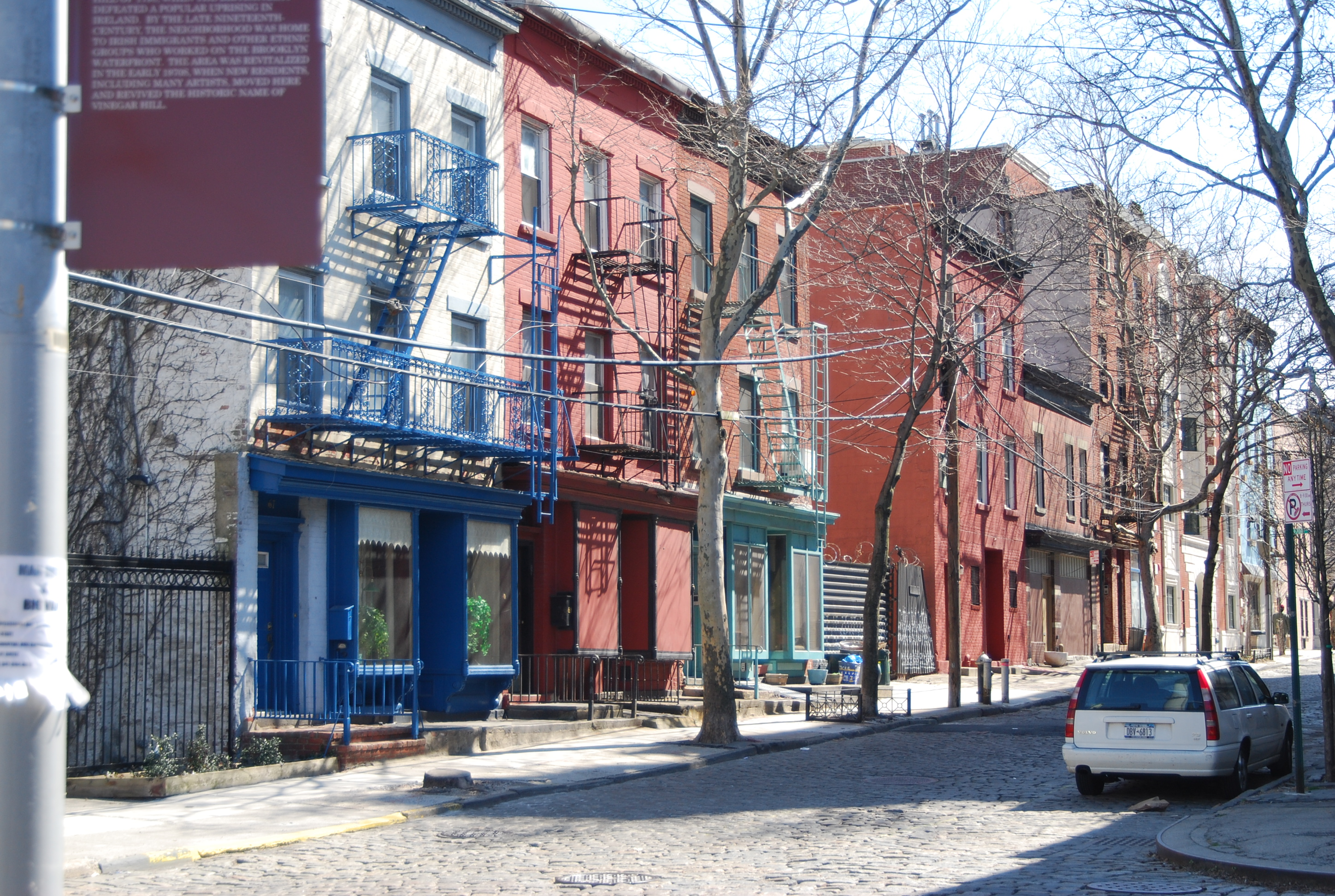
- Historic houses on Hudson Avenue.
- Nickname: Irishtown
- Location in New York City
- Coordinates: 40.702°N 73.981°W
- Country: United States
- State: New York
- City: New York City
- Borough: Brooklyn
- Community District: Brooklyn 2

Area
  - Total: 0.101 sq mi (0.26 km^{2})

Population (2016)
  - Total: 2,671
  - Density: 26,400/sq mi (10,200/km^{2})

Economics
  - Median income: $231,427
- Time zone: UTC−5 (Eastern)
  - Summer (DST): UTC−4 (EDT)
- ZIP Codes: 11251, 11201
- Area codes: 718, 347, 929, and 917

Vinegar Hill is a neighborhood in the borough of Brooklyn in New York City on the East River Waterfront between Dumbo and the Brooklyn Navy Yard. The neighborhood is locally governed by Brooklyn Community Board 2 and is policed by the New York City Police Department's 84th Precinct. (Note: 84th Precinct, NYPD.) The large Irish-American population in Vinegar Hill made it one of several New York City neighborhoods once known colloquially as Irishtown.

== Etymology ==
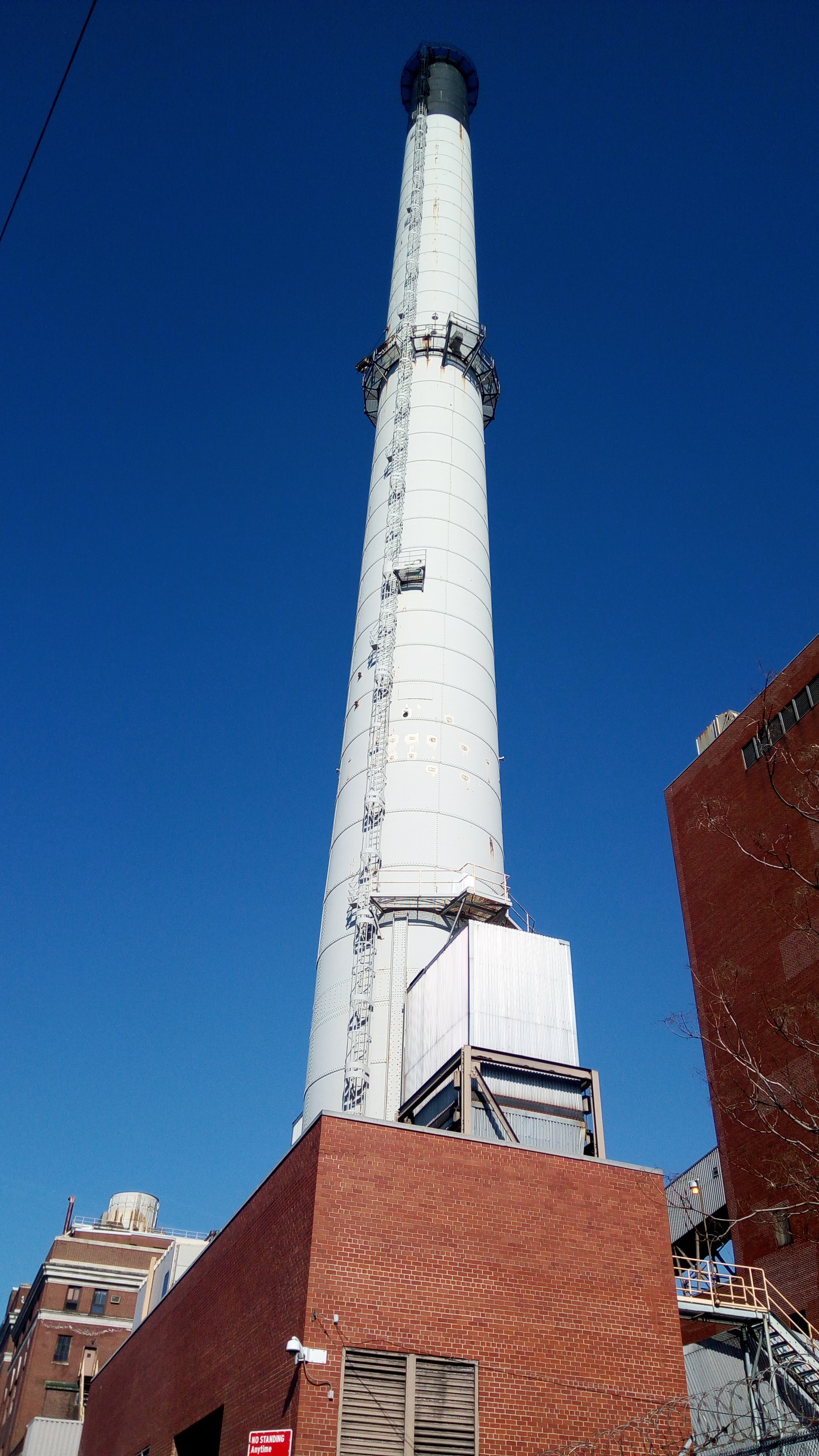
This smoke stack is the only one left at the ConEdison substation at Hudson Avenue since the removal of four other smoke stacks in February 2011.

Vinegar Hill gets its name from the Battle of Vinegar Hill, an engagement near Enniscorthy during the Irish Rebellion of 1798.

Vinegar Hill was commonly known as "Irishtown" in the 19th century, one of several places in the New York area with that moniker because of its sizable population of Irish immigrants.

== Character ==
Vinegar Hill stretches from the East River waterfront to Front Street and from the Brooklyn Navy Yard to Bridge Street, roughly comprising a six block area. Before the construction of the Brooklyn-Queens Expressway in the 1950s, Vinegar Hill's area was significantly larger, extending south to Tillary Street, including what is now known as Bridge Plaza.

The neighborhood also includes the New York City Housing Authority's Farragut Houses. Most of Vinegar Hill consists of 19th-century Federal Style and Greek Revival style homes mixed with industrial buildings. Hudson Avenue and Plymouth, Water and Front Streets are made of Belgian Blocks, although residents mistakenly refer to them as cobblestones.

Vinegar Hill has been described as a very quiet neighborhood where its residents know one another. According to a New York Times article published in 1999, some residents of Vinegar Hill are opposed to making any changes to the small neighborhood.

The Vinegar Hill area includes the Vinegar Hill Historic District and is home to the Con Edison Hudson Avenue Generating station. (Note: See also this map) The station is not very productive as of 2017 and there are many debates as to what the station should be converted to.

On the corner of Evans and Little Streets is Quarters A (the Commandant's House), a Federal Style mansion next to the Navy Yard which was once home to Commodore Matthew C. Perry. This house was built in 1805.

91 Hudson Avenue in Vinegar Hill is the location of the former first burial place and monument of the Prison Ship Martyrs of the American Revolutionary War.

== History ==
=== Pre-colonial ===
The Canarsee Indians were the first inhabitants of what is now western Brooklyn. The Canarsee were members of the Algonquian who occupied the Atlantic seaboard from Canada to North Carolina. They were an autonomous band of the Delaware (Leni Lenape) Indians. They established their villages close to the water including the higher ground near the Wallabout Bay that they called Rinnegokonck. They lived communally in several settlements in western Brooklyn, including one located on the high ground near the present-day Vinegar Hill Historic District, called Rinnegokonc. In the seventeenth century, European explorers arrived on the land and started doing business with Native Americans.

=== Settlement ===
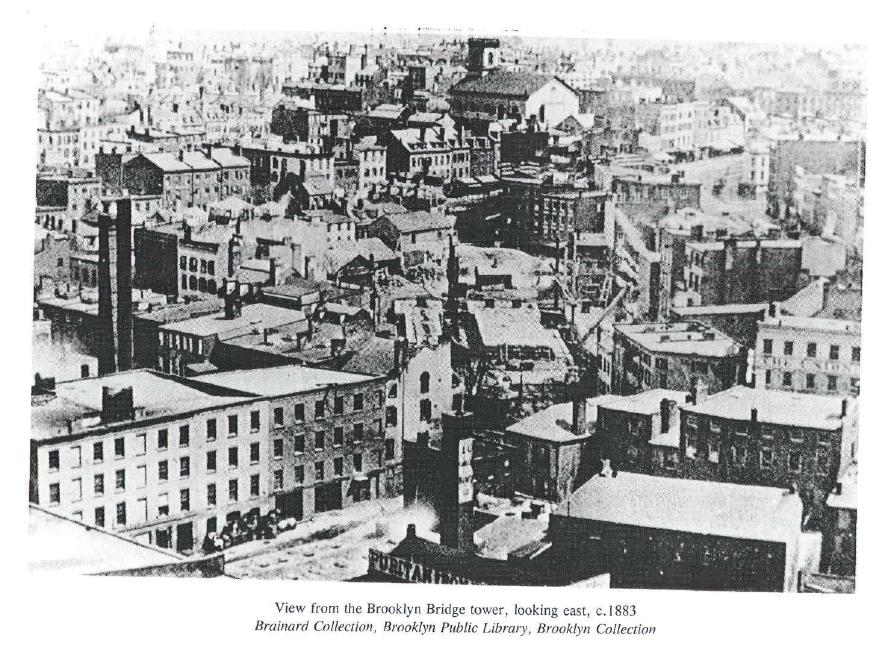
Vinegar Hill in 1883 from the tower of the Brooklyn Bridge

Dutch settlers began arriving in 1637 along the waterfront area up, up to Fulton Street. When the Dutch settlers arrived in the early seventeenth century, the Canarsee, already weakened by disease, hunger, and warfare, began to sell their land to the settlers and commenced on a long westward migration that would take them as far as Illinois territory.

The land was sold by the Indians to Joris Jansen Rapalje. Rapelje acquired the land for farming purposes; it was renamed to Breuckelen circa 1646. The first ferry began operating from the northern point of Fulton street few years earlier in 1642. It connected the land of Breuckelen with Manhattan, the route spanning the East River.

In 1674, the English subjects, under the rule of King Charles II, took control over the land during the events of the Third Anglo-Dutch War. Then, Kings County consisted of six regions: Brooklyn, Bushwick, Flatbush, Flatlands, Gravesend, New Utrecht. The Vinegar Hill district was part of the region of Brooklyn.

=== 18th century ===
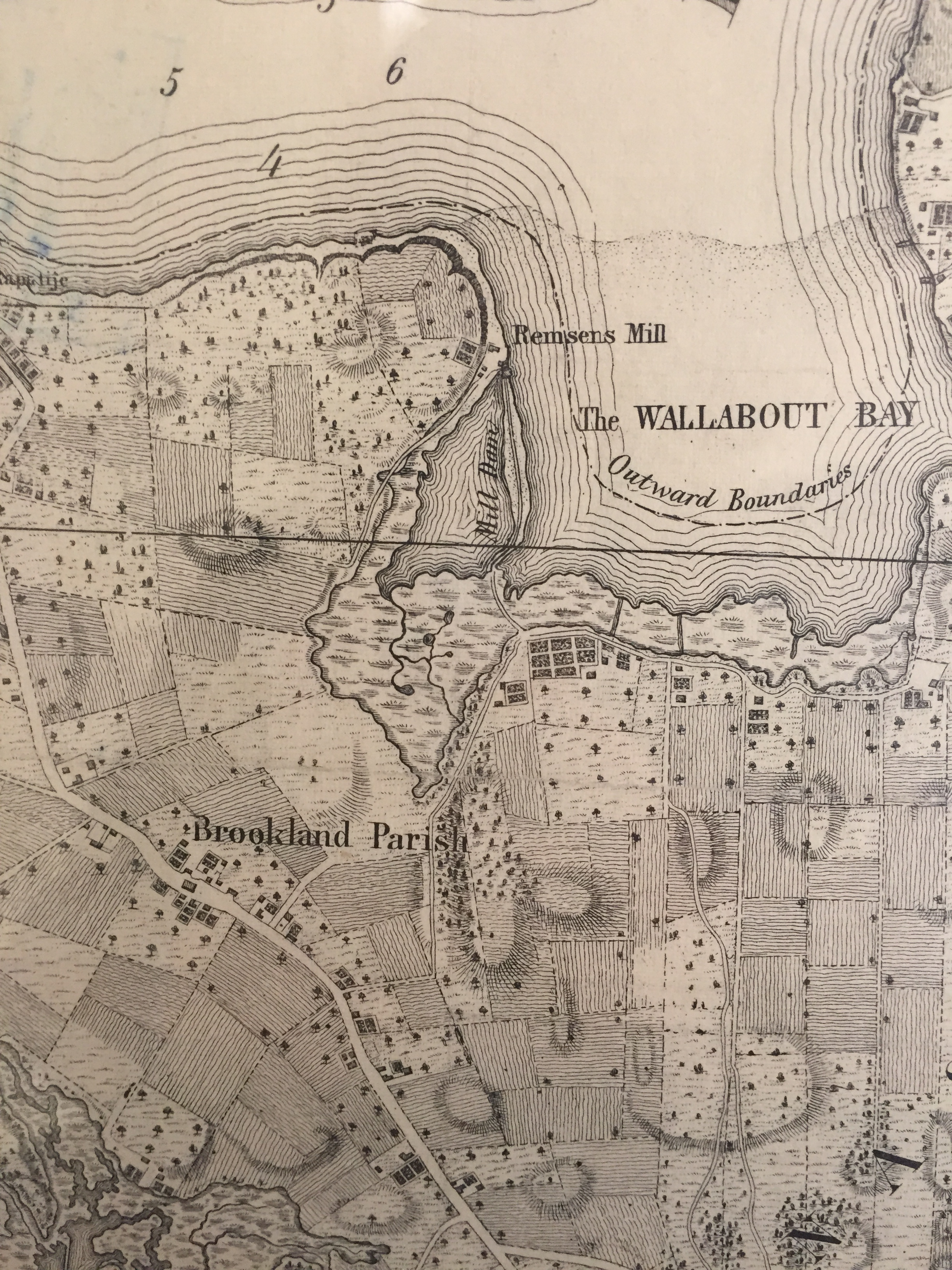
East River side of Brooklyn and present Vinegar Hill area in 1767

Commissioners of Forfeiture took hold of the land from Joris Jansen Rapalje and sold the area of Gold Street to Comfort and Joshua Sands in 1784. The Sandses were planning to develop the land as a summer place for New Yorkers. They built a lot of blocks for a community that was called "Olympia" in 1787.

In the late eighteenth century, John Jackson bought 100 acres around of the waterfront area near the Wallabout Bay from Remsen estate and built there his own shipyard. He also built houses for the shipyard workers. The historical reminder of the Sands family and Jackson are still seen on the maps as names of the streets in the Vinegar Hill area.

=== 19th century ===
In the first years of the nineteenth century, Jackson sold 40 acres (16 ha) to the United States government for the Brooklyn Navy Yard, and then built additional housing for Navy Yard personnel. Jackson named the area in honor of the Battle of Vinegar Hill, the last battle of an Irish-English conflict, with the hope of attracting Irish immigrants to the area, although Germans, Norwegians and Poles also settled there.

The Sands family, who had amassed a fortune as merchants and speculators, laid out their land, located west of Jackson's property, into blocks and lots for a community to be called "Olympia” as early as 1787.

The brothers expected Olympia to become a summer retreat for New Yorkers because of its hilly topography, plentiful water, and refreshing breezes. However, the Sandses' lots that are located within the historic district were not developed residentially until the mid-1830s to the early 1850s.

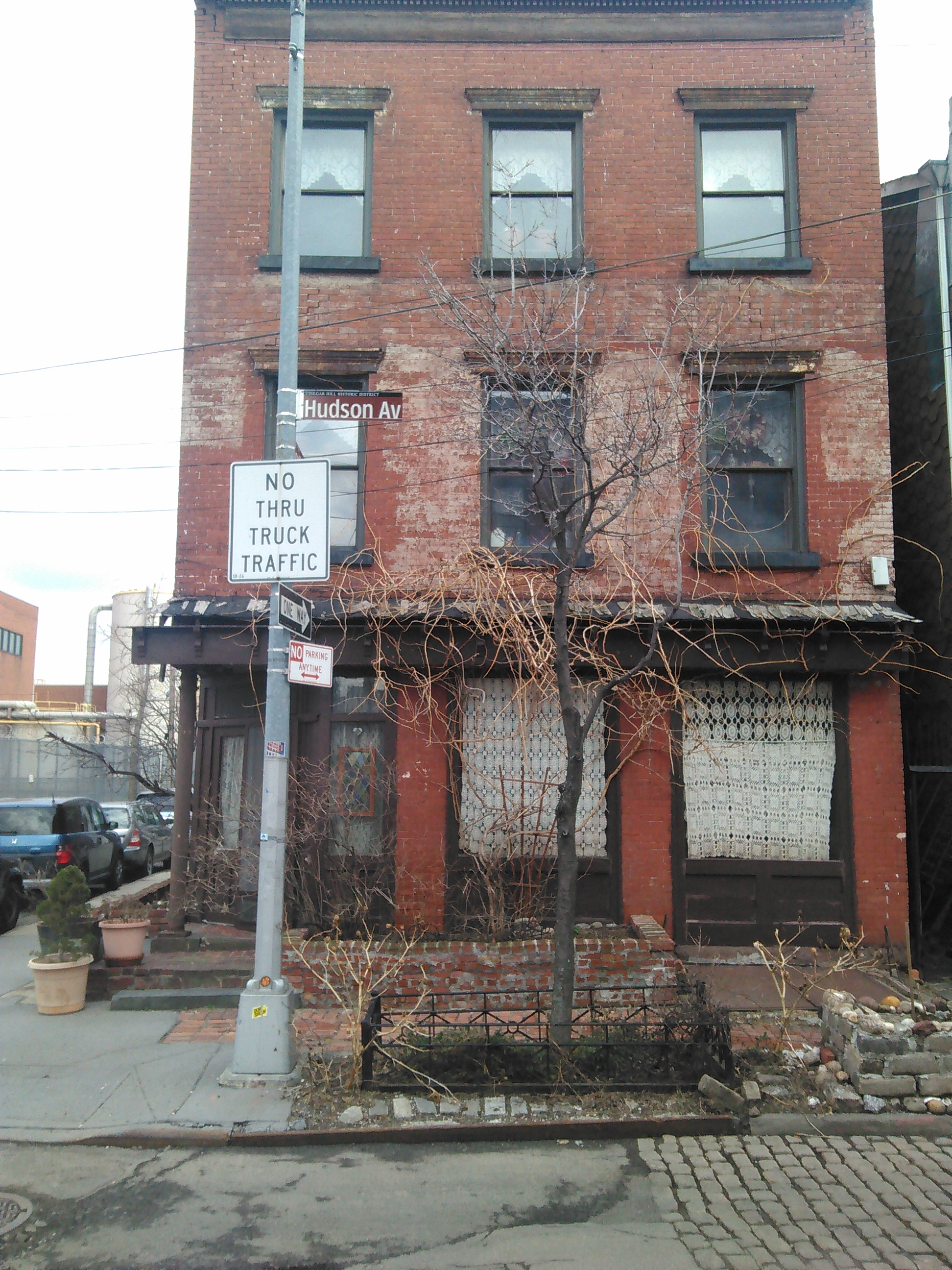
Building on corner of Hudson and Plymouth

In the 1800s and 1810s, the area started developing faster. In the late 1830s and early 1840s, the heirs of John Jackson sold off their estate's remaining lots on Hudson Avenue, which were developed individually or in small groups in the 1840s and 1850s with houses that have Greek Revival and Italianate characteristics because of the associations with Athenian democracy.

Classic Greek architectural forms were reinterpreted by the architects and builders of the new Republic in their designs for buildings both large and small, whether State Capitol or small row house. Further residential construction occurred on a few remaining vacant lots on Hudson Avenue, Water Street, and Front Street in the years following the Civil War.

In the mid-19th century, the area became home to illegal distilleries producing moonshine known as "potheen" (from Irish poitín, "little pot"). Alcohol was legal but heavily taxed, and the moonshining trade pumped significant cash to the working-class neighborhood. In Vinegar Hill, the potheen business was operated largely by a quartet consisting of John Devlin, John Whiteford, "Ginger" Farrell, and "Ned" Brady. The Bureau of Internal Revenue, created in 1862 and desperate for funds after the costly American Civil War, would send in Army veterans to raid the neighborhood and destroy the stills.

On one occasion, in 1869, the Army destroyed stills that were capable of churning out 250 barrels of alcohol each day—a volume worth $5,000 in unpaid taxes (equivalent to $127,303 in 2025). The battles between the government and the neighborhood became known as the "Whisky Wars" and left the residents of Vinegar Hill suspicious of outsiders.

An 1894 article in The New York Times recalled those days:

"The extent of the moonshine traffic was never fully known to outsiders. The whole neighborhood was a unit in defense of the stills. While from scores of cellars the smoke of illegal and surreptitious manufacture ascended, access was not easy and proof of guilt was difficult to obtain. The peasantry of the Wickford (sic) Mountains were never firmer in their sympathy with the makers of "potheen" than were these denizens of ancient "Irishtown." The wary intruder who passed that way had good reason to avoid suspicion of being a spy. The least intimation that he was inquisitively included would bring a rabble at his heels and insure him a cracked crown if not more grievous injuries."—New York Times, March 18, 1894

=== 20th century to present ===
Some of the buildings in Vinegar Hill were originally warehouses, which since the early 2000s have been turned into loft buildings or office spaces. One building being repurposed is the fire house on 227 Front Street, which was turned into a loft building.

When the Manhattan Bridge was being constructed in the 1900s, the main areas within Vinegar Hill had to be destroyed. The industrial growth caused the replacement of many houses by factories and warehouses. A vital moment was the construction of a large power plant on the East River waterfront in the 1920s by the Consolidated Edison Company. These major changes happened until 1961. The shutdown of the Navy Yard in 1966 ended up being a result of New York’s shift from an industrial economy to a more service-oriented economy. It was a sign of decline and a clear demonstration of the lost relation with the waterfront.

The area began a revitalization in the 1970s when an ethnically diverse group of newcomers, many of whom were artists, came to the area attracted by the views and proximity of Manhattan. These residents brought back the name Vinegar Hill for the area and helped preserve the Belgian block streets. The City of New York, petitioned by the residents of Vinegar Hill, declared the area a Historical District in the late 1990s.

In 2008, Sam Buffa and Jean Adamson opened Vinegar Hill House on 72 Hudson Avenue, a former apartment turned 41-seat restaurant, the first eatery to open on the block since a diner closed in the 1970s. In 2018, Cafe Gitane opened at 70 Hudson Avenue, a rustic spot with a turntable and about 10 tables.

== Demographics ==
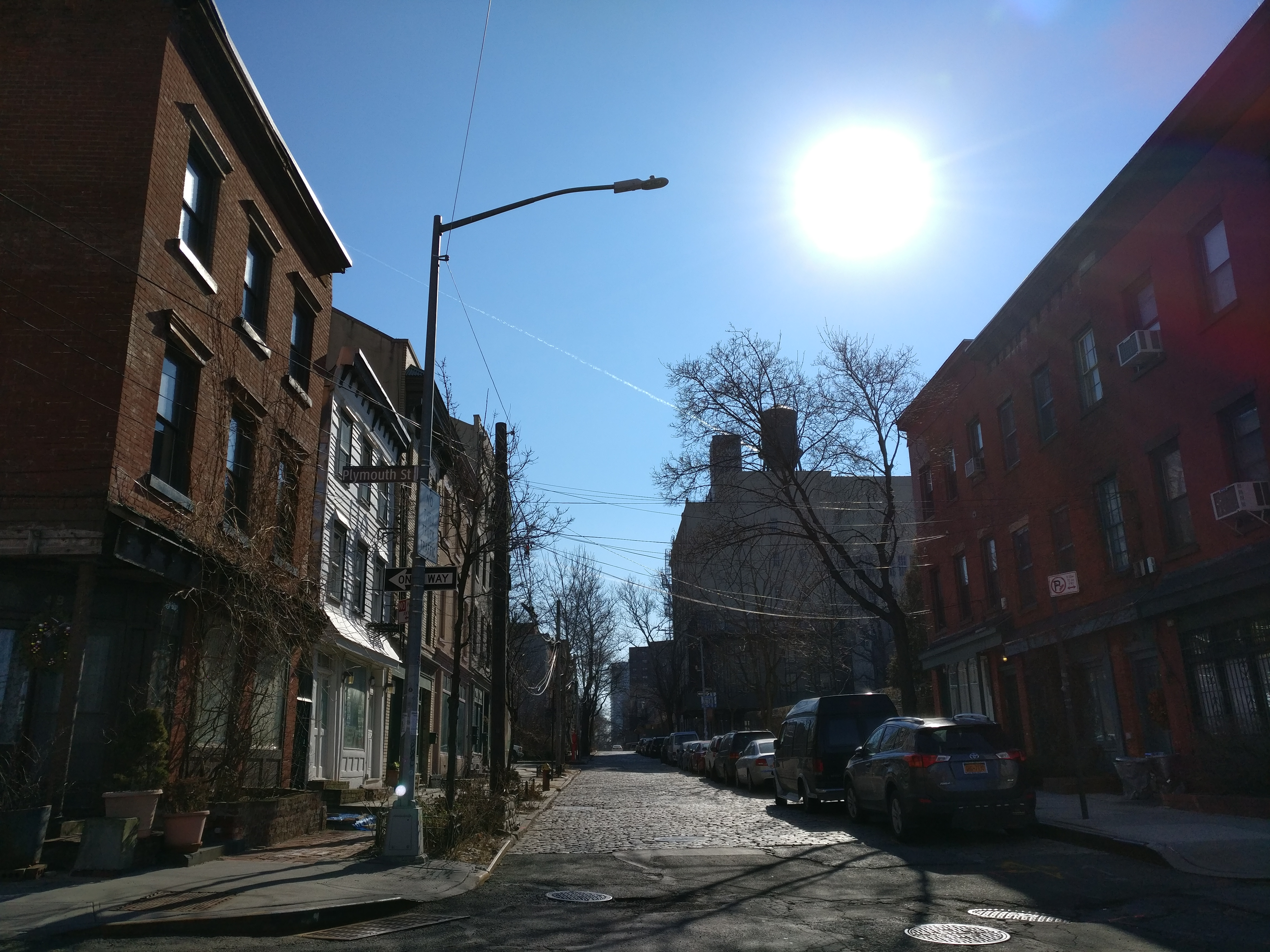
In February 2017

Many Irish immigrants lived in Vinegar Hill and worked in the Navy Yard in 1798. Before and following the First World War and the great migration of people from Eastern Europe to the United States, Vinegar Hill became predominantly a neighborhood of Lithuanian immigrants, reaching 75% by the 1930 Census.

The Lithuanian immigrant population of the area continued into the 1960s. In the shops on Hudson Avenue, the language spoken was Lithuanian. These immigrants brought their strong Roman Catholic religious beliefs with them and built a church on York Street, St. George R.C. Church. It was believed that the Lithuanians were not received by the two Irish churches, (St. Ann & St. Edwards) which is what led to the construction of the St. George R.C. Church.

== Transportation ==
The neighborhood of Vinegar Hill is close to the New York City Subway's York Street station (F and <F> trains) and the High Street station (A and C trains). Other modes of public transportation includes the MTA Regional Bus Operations' B62 and B67 buses.
