= UQO =

UQO or Uqo may refer to:

- Université du Québec en Outaouais
- Unquadoctium, an unsynthesized chemical element with atomic number 148 and symbol Uqo
