= Dumbo, Brooklyn =

Neighborhood in New York City

Dumbo Down Under the Manhattan Bridge Overpass
- Neighborhood
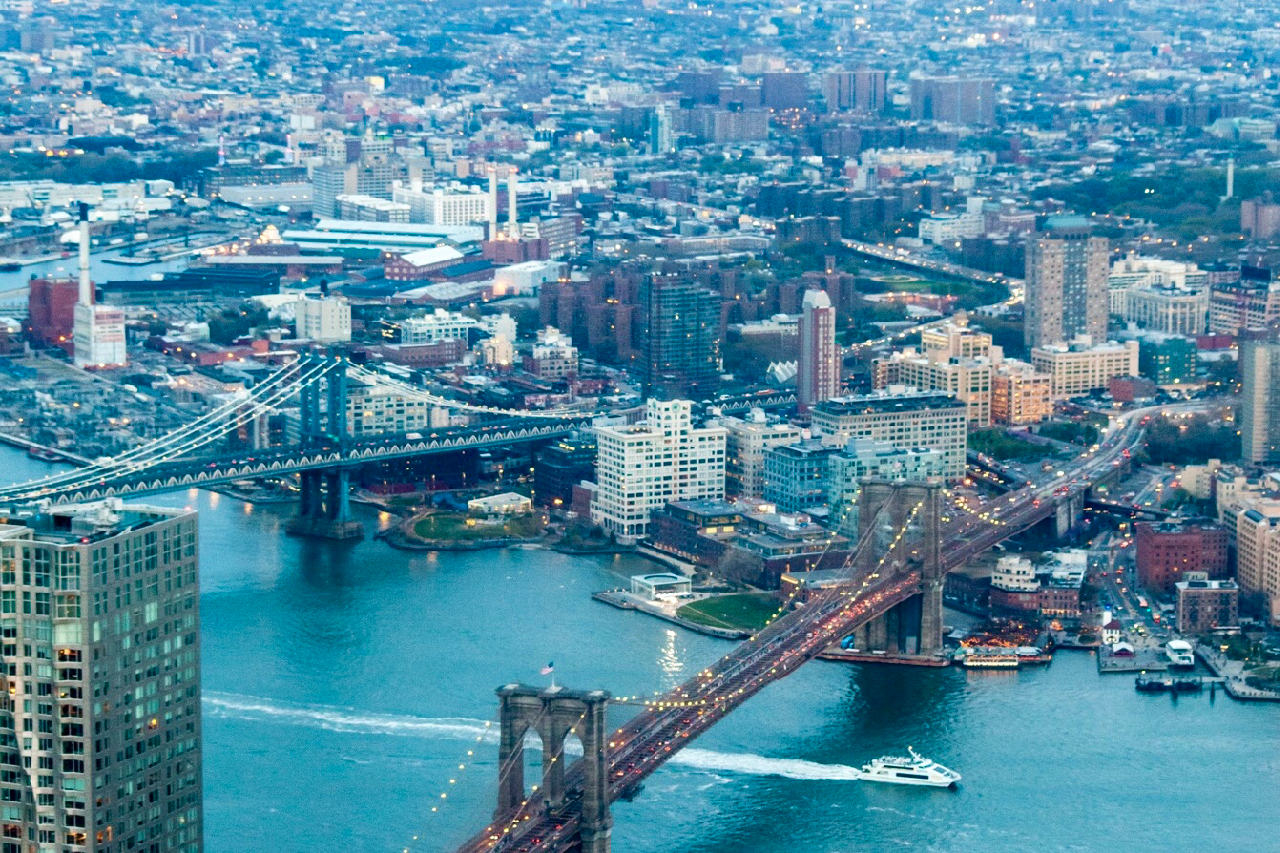
- View of Dumbo from One World Trade Center in 2016, framed by the Brooklyn Bridge (bottom right) and Manhattan Bridge (center left)
- Interactive map of Dumbo
- Location Dumbo (New York) Dumbo (the United States)
- Coordinates: 40.703°N 73.990°W
- Country: United States
- State: New York
- City: New York City
- Borough: Brooklyn

Area
  - Total: 0.11 sq mi (0.28 km^{2})

Population (2020)
  - Total: 4,975
  - Density: 45,000/sq mi (17,000/km^{2})
- ZIP Codes: 11201
- Area codes: 718, 347, 929, and 917
- DUMBO Industrial District
- U.S. National Register of Historic Places
- U.S. Historic district
- New York State Register of Historic Places
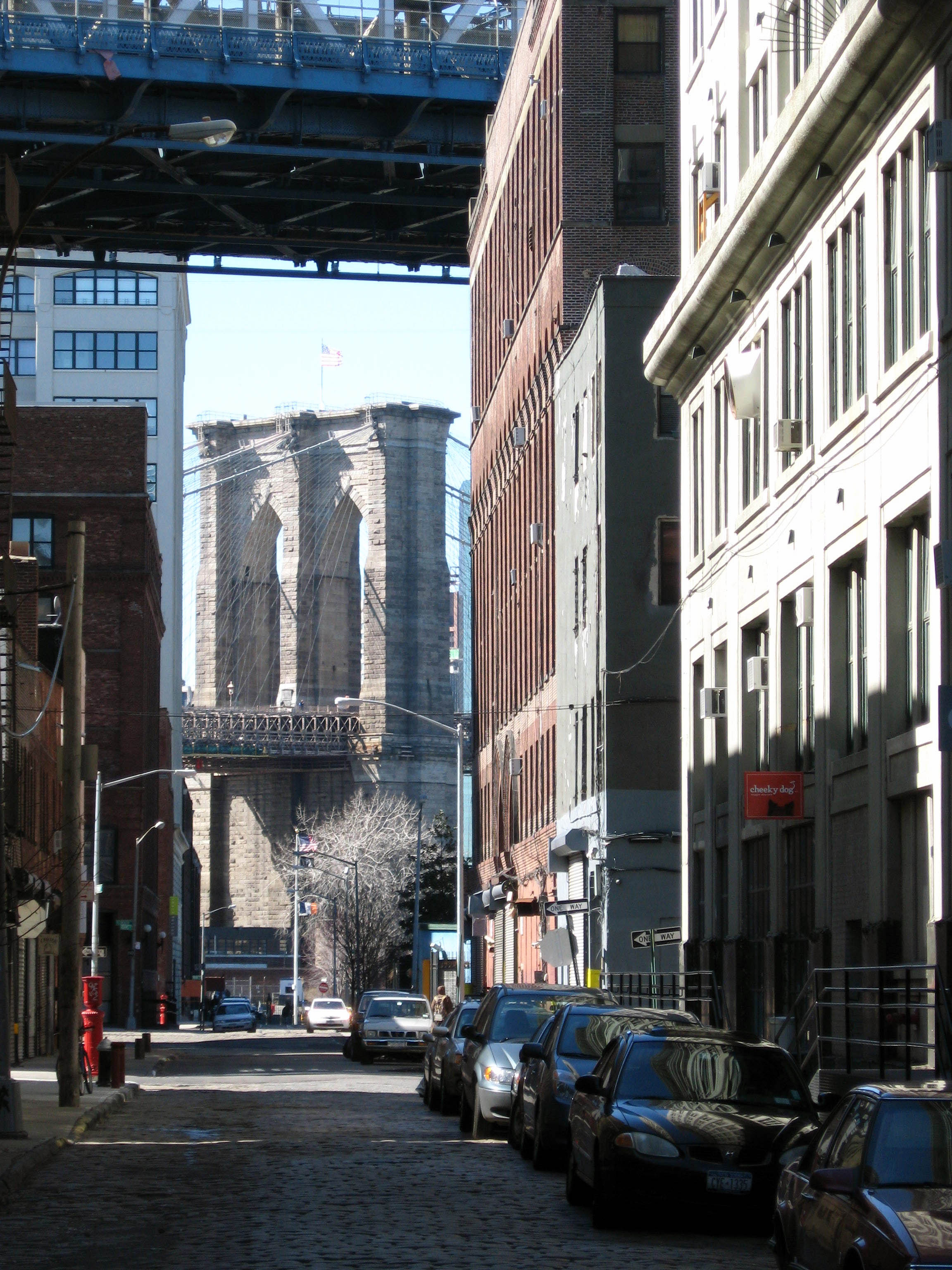
- Plymouth Street, DUMBO Industrial District, March 2008

- Location within New York City Location within New York Location within the United States
- Location: Roughly bounded by Main and Washington Sts, East River, John St., Bridge and Jay Sts., and Front and York Sts., Brooklyn, New York
- Coordinates: 40°42′11″N 73°59′17″W
- Area: 48 acres (19 ha)
- Built: 1883
- Architect: multiple
- Architectural style: Greek Revival, Italianate, et al.
- NRHP reference No.: 00001151

Significant dates
- Added to NRHP: September 22, 2000
- Designated NYSRHP: July 11, 2000

Dumbo (or DUMBO, an acronym for Down Under the Manhattan Bridge Overpass (Note: Alternatively, it has been described as an acronym for District Under the Manhattan Bridge Overpass.)) is a neighborhood in the New York City borough of Brooklyn. It encompasses two sections: one situated between the Manhattan and Brooklyn Bridges, which connect Brooklyn to Manhattan across the East River, and another extending eastward from the Manhattan Bridge to the Vinegar Hill area. The neighborhood is bounded by Brooklyn Bridge Park to the north, the Brooklyn Bridge to the west, Brooklyn Heights to the south, and Vinegar Hill to the east. Dumbo is part of Brooklyn Community Board 2.

Dumbo has historically been known by several names, including Gairville, Rapailie, Olympia, and Walentasville. The area was originally a ferry landing, characterized by 19th- and early 20th-century industrial and warehouse buildings, Belgian block streets, and its location on the East River by the imposing anchorage of the Manhattan Bridge. A large number of the buildings in Dumbo were bought by developer David Walentas and his company Two Trees Management in the late 20th century, and remade into an upscale residential and commercial community—first becoming a haven for art galleries, and currently a center for technology startups.

Dumbo earned the nickname "the center of the Brooklyn Tech Triangle" thanks to its thriving community of tech startups. This designation coincided with its rise to become Brooklyn's most affluent neighborhood and the fourth-wealthiest community in New York City; this is owing in part to its large concentration of technology startups, its close proximity to Manhattan, and its large number of former industrial buildings that have been converted into spacious luxury residential lofts. The neighborhood contains the corporate headquarters for e-commerce retailer Etsy and home furnishing stores company West Elm.

== History ==
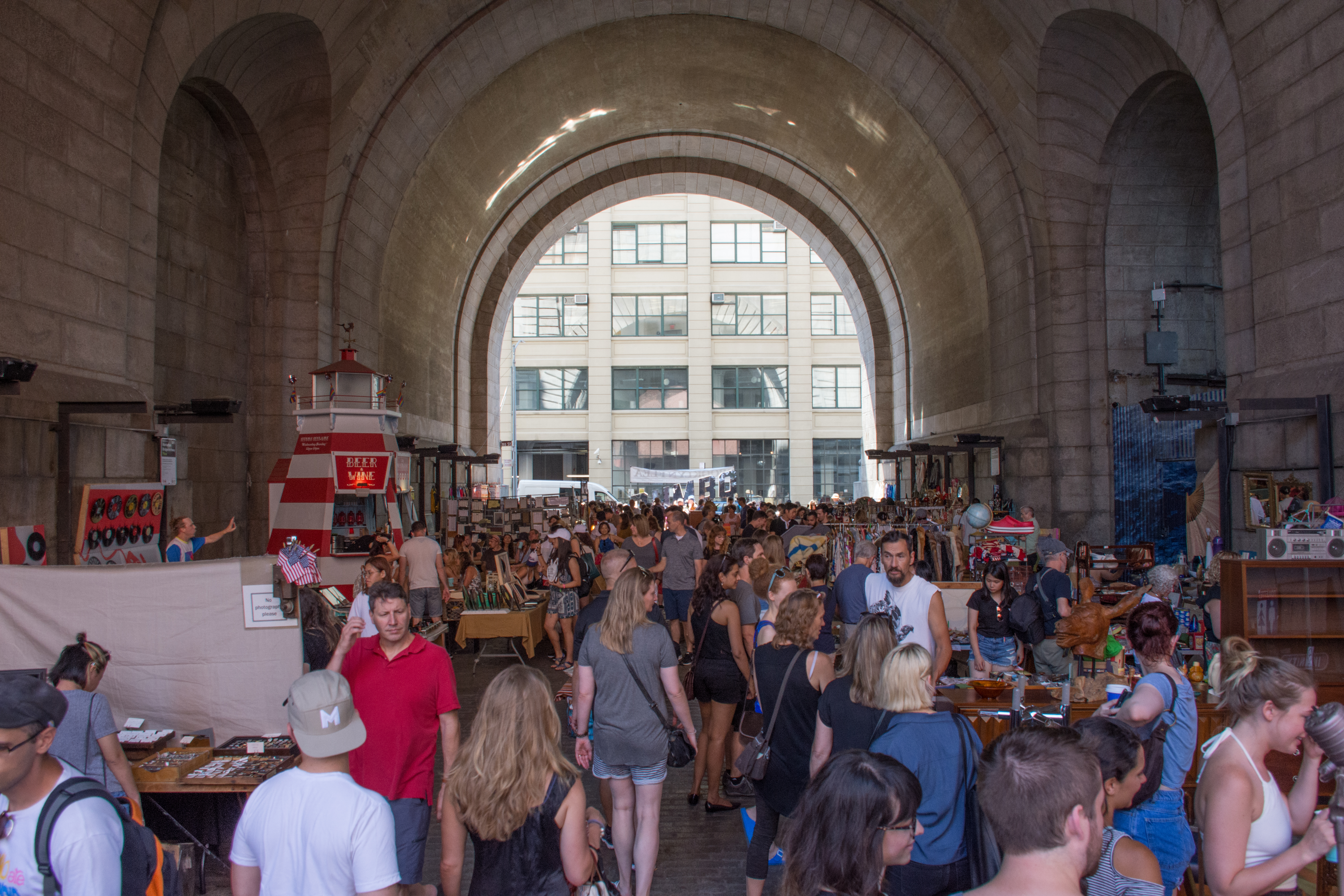
A street fair under the Manhattan Bridge overpass in July 2017

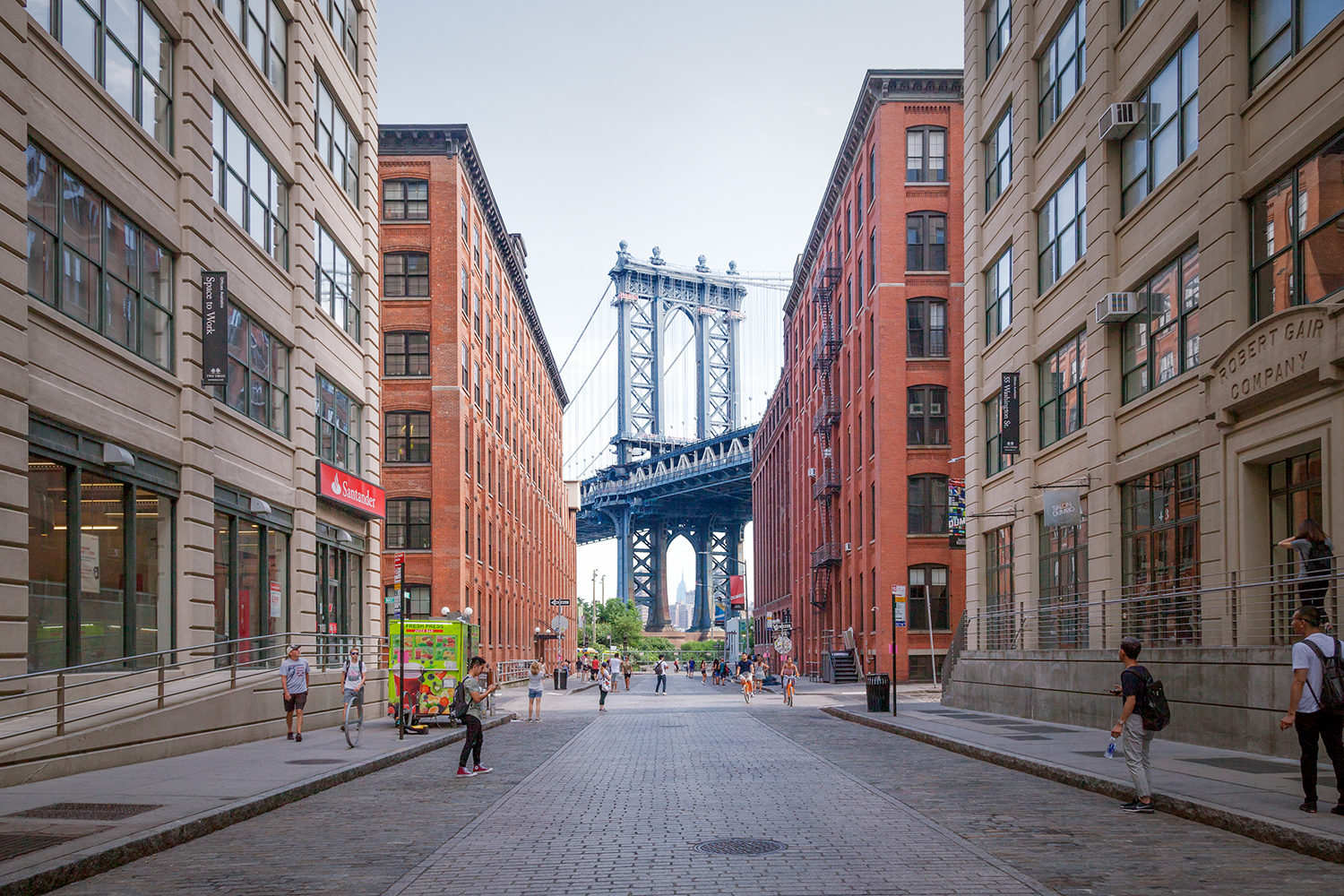
The Manhattan Bridge, framing the Empire State Building beneath, as seen from Washington Street

The name is an acronym of "Down Under the Manhattan Bridge Overpass". The area has been known variously as Rapailie, Olympia, and Walentasville; the developer who began its current gentrification is Two Trees Management, led at the time by David Walentas. The "Olympia" name came from Comfort and Joshua Sands, who bought the land in 1787 and were planning to develop the land as a summer place for New Yorkers. Through the 18th and 19th centuries, the area now known as Dumbo was considered part of Vinegar Hill.

In the 1890s, the western portion of the neighborhood was known as Fulton Landing, after the ferry stop that connected it to Manhattan before the Brooklyn Bridge opened. At that time, it was primarily a manufacturing district, with warehouses and factories that made machinery, paper boxes, spices and Brillo soap pads. The cardboard box was invented in the Robert Gair building on Washington Street by Robert Gair, a Scottish emigrant; because of Gair's fame, the area was known as Gairsville for a long time. The Gair building is now home to Etsy.

The Jay Street Connecting Railroad ran through Dumbo's waterfront from circa 1904–1906 through 1957. It ran from rail yards beneath the Manhattan and Brooklyn Bridges to buildings near the waterfront in Dumbo and Vinegar Hill. At the height of operations, it had spurs into several buildings, a car float bridge on Bridge Street, and a yard with capacity of 120 cars. The tracks were abandoned in 1959, though the railroad's tracks are still visible on streets in Dumbo. In 1968, there was a proposal to relocate the Fort Greene Meat Market to Dumbo, though the market was ultimately moved to Sunset Park instead.

John Street Park in Dumbo

With the deindustrialization of New York City, Dumbo began to become primarily residential; artists and other young homesteaders seeking relatively large and inexpensive loft apartment spaces for studios and homes began moving there in the late 1970s. The acronym "Dumbo" arose in 1978, when new residents coined it in the belief such an unattractive name would help deter developers.

Near the end of the 20th century, as property became more and more expensive in Manhattan, Dumbo became increasingly gentrified. Even so, the acronym "Dumbo" was largely unknown as late as 1997, and the area itself was very inclusive, serving mainly as an enclave for artists located along the East River and under the Manhattan Bridge. At this stage there were still many air conditioner repair shops, auto shops, and "seedy back alleys and wharves"; and, because the neighborhood was still gentrifying from its industrial past, it lacked even a bookstore, coffee shop, or laundromat. The efforts of Joy Glidden, the Founding Director of the Dumbo Arts Center (DAC) and co-founder of the Dumbo Art Under the Bridge Festival, achieved successful development in Dumbo, which is now a model for similar waterfront developments around the world. Glidden stated of Dumbo's gentrification, "It may be one of the last of what could be considered a true arts community in New York."

The DUMBO Historic District, a historic industrial complex and national historic district in Dumbo, was listed on the National Register of Historic Places in 2000. It consists of 95 contributing buildings; the manufacturing concerns located in this district included Benjamin Moore & Co. (paint), Arbuckle Brothers (coffee and sugar), J.W. Masury & Son (paint), Robert Gair (paper boxes), E.W. Bliss (machinery), and Brillo (soap pads). The district includes the earliest large-scale reinforced concrete factory buildings in America. On December 18, 2007, the New York City Landmarks Preservation Commission voted unanimously to designate Dumbo as the city's 90th historic district. The Dumbo historic district consists of properties bounded by John Street to the north, York Street to the south, Main Street to the west, and Bridge Street to the east.

In 2017, a Historic Districts Council report found that the cobblestone streets in Dumbo did not conform to the Americans with Disabilities Act of 1990 and that the cobblestones had to be repaired or removed. At the time, the city government was already planning to restore the streets. The city government completed a $108 million rehabilitation of cobblestone streets in Dumbo and neighboring Vinegar Hill in 2025. The project uncovered several thousand artifacts from as far back as the 18th century.

== Land use ==
=== Art, business, and leisure ===
The area has emerged as one of New York City's premier arts districts, with a cluster of for-profit art galleries such as the Klompching Gallery, and such not-for-profit institutions as the St. Ann's Warehouse the A.I.R. Gallery and the first post-COVID-19 performance venue to open in the area The Rat NYC.

Chef Jacques Torres opened a chocolate factory in Dumbo in December 2000. Other culinary businesses in the area include Grimaldi's, Ample Hills Creamery, Almondine Bakery, and The River Café, all clustered in Fulton Landing, also home to Bargemusic, a floating venue for classical music. John Fluevog, a Canadian shoe designer, opened a store on Main Street in November 2017.

The first public space in the neighborhood was Fulton Ferry, followed by Empire-Fulton Ferry State Park. The first six acres of Brooklyn Bridge Park, a joint state/city venture under development, were opened in March 2010. The Cliffs at DUMBO is a 7,800 square foot outdoor climbing gym located in the Main Street section of Brooklyn Bridge Park, and is the largest outdoor bouldering gym in North America.

The building at 200 Water Street, which the Brillo Manufacturing Co. once occupied, is being renovated as a high-end condo building.

The DUMBO Archway is a popular location for film shoots, art exhibitions, live music, large-scale events, and watch parties for events like the World Cup. The trailer for Joker, the 2019 film by Todd Phillips, features actor Joaquin Phoenix as the Joker running through the archway. The Archway also hosts the Brooklyn Flea every Sunday from April to October. The outdoor market features 80 vendors, and the products range from secondhand goods to custom-made jewelry.

Gleason's Gym, located on Water Street, is the oldest boxing gym in New York. Many champions have trained there, including Muhammad Ali and Mike Tyson. The gym has been located in DUMBO since the 1980s. It moved from 77 Front Street to its current location at 130 Water Street in 2016.

The renovation of Empire Stores on Water Street was completed in 2017. Previously, it had been a Civil War era coffee warehouse. It was converted to mixed-use retail and office space, and it includes West Elm's global flagship store. Other retailers in Empire Stores include Detroit-based watchmaker Shinola and the café and accessories store, FEED Projects. In May 2017, the Brooklyn Historical Society (BHS) opened a new branch in Empire Stores (its main location is in Brooklyn Heights). BHS features exhibits and artifacts relating to DUMBO's industrial past. In May 2019, Time Out Market opened in Empire Stores. The food hall features 21 local vendors, including the Breads Bakery and DUMBO's renowned pizzeria, Juliana's.

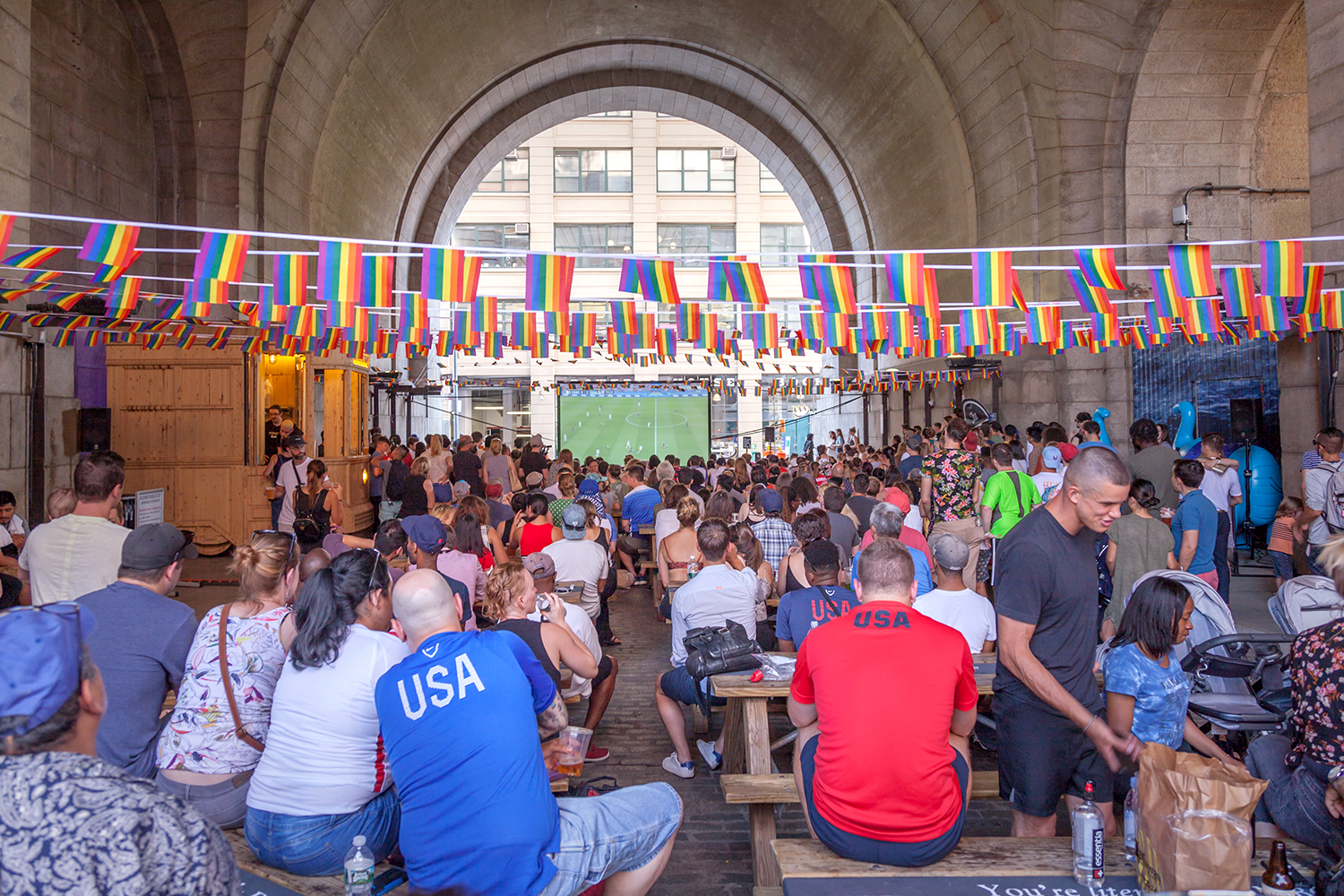
Women's World Cup screening in DUMBO 2019 (USA vs. France)

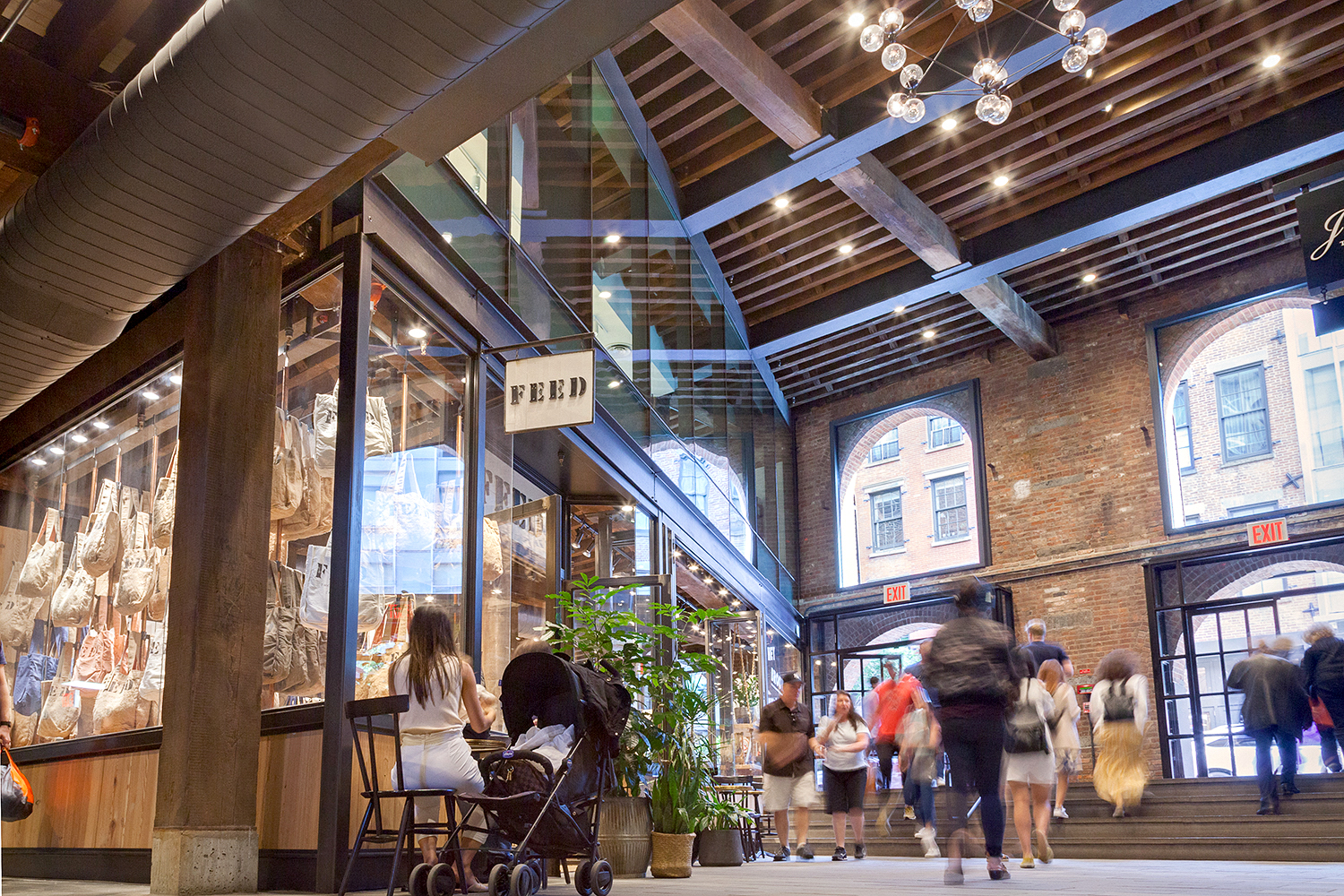
Empire Stores lobby (FEED store on the left)

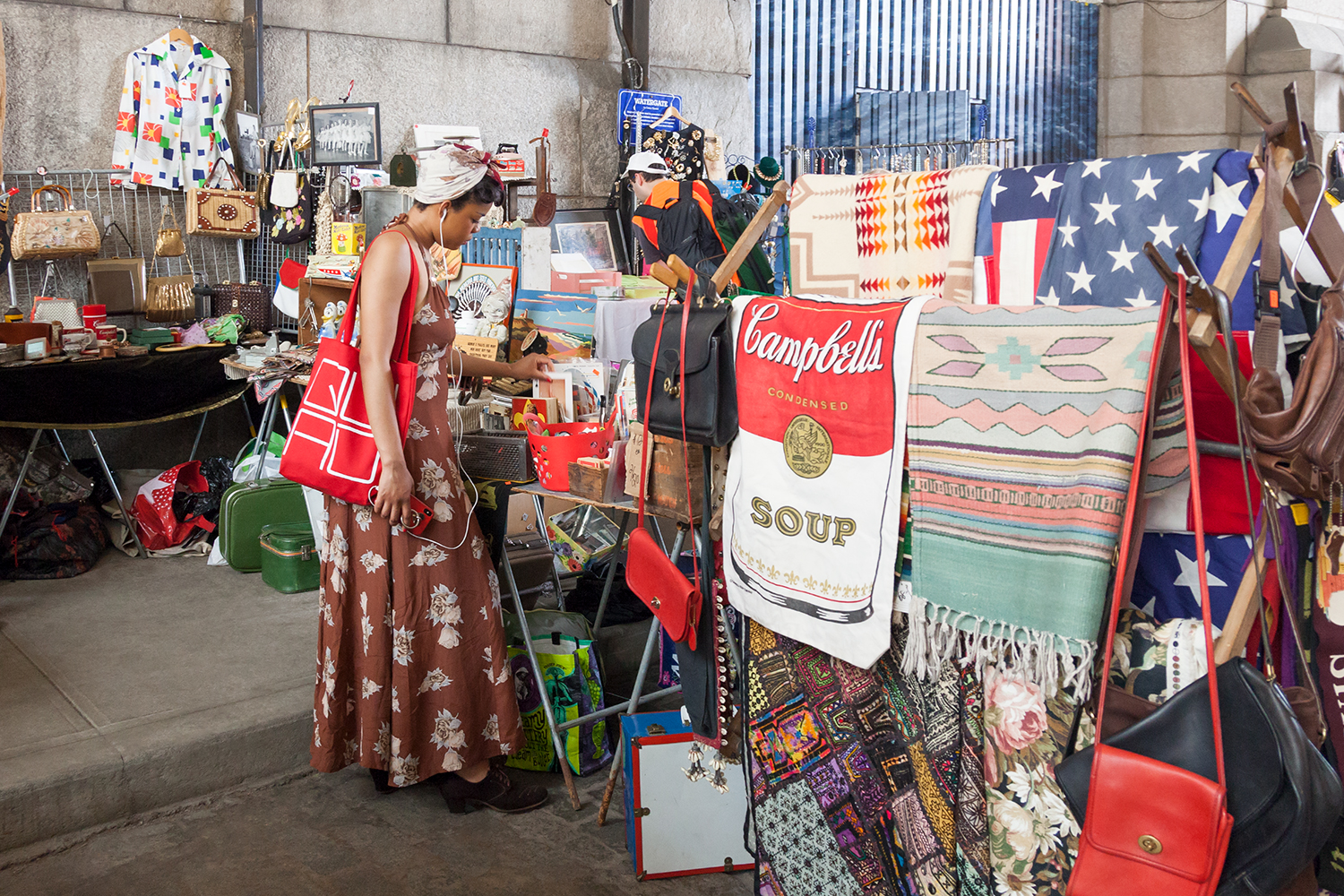
Vendor display under the DUMBO Archway at Brooklyn Flea

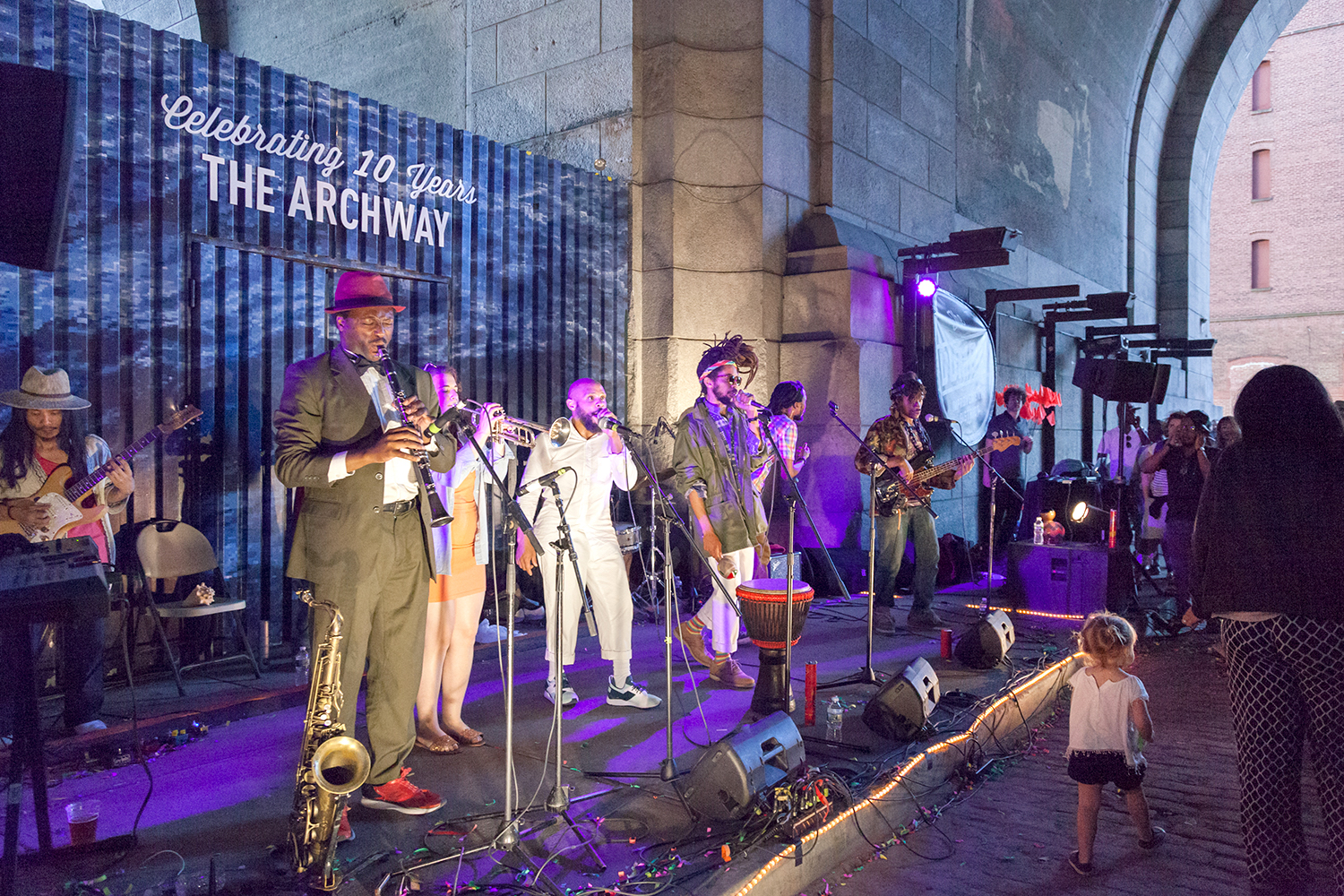
DUMBO Archway 10th Anniversary Celebration

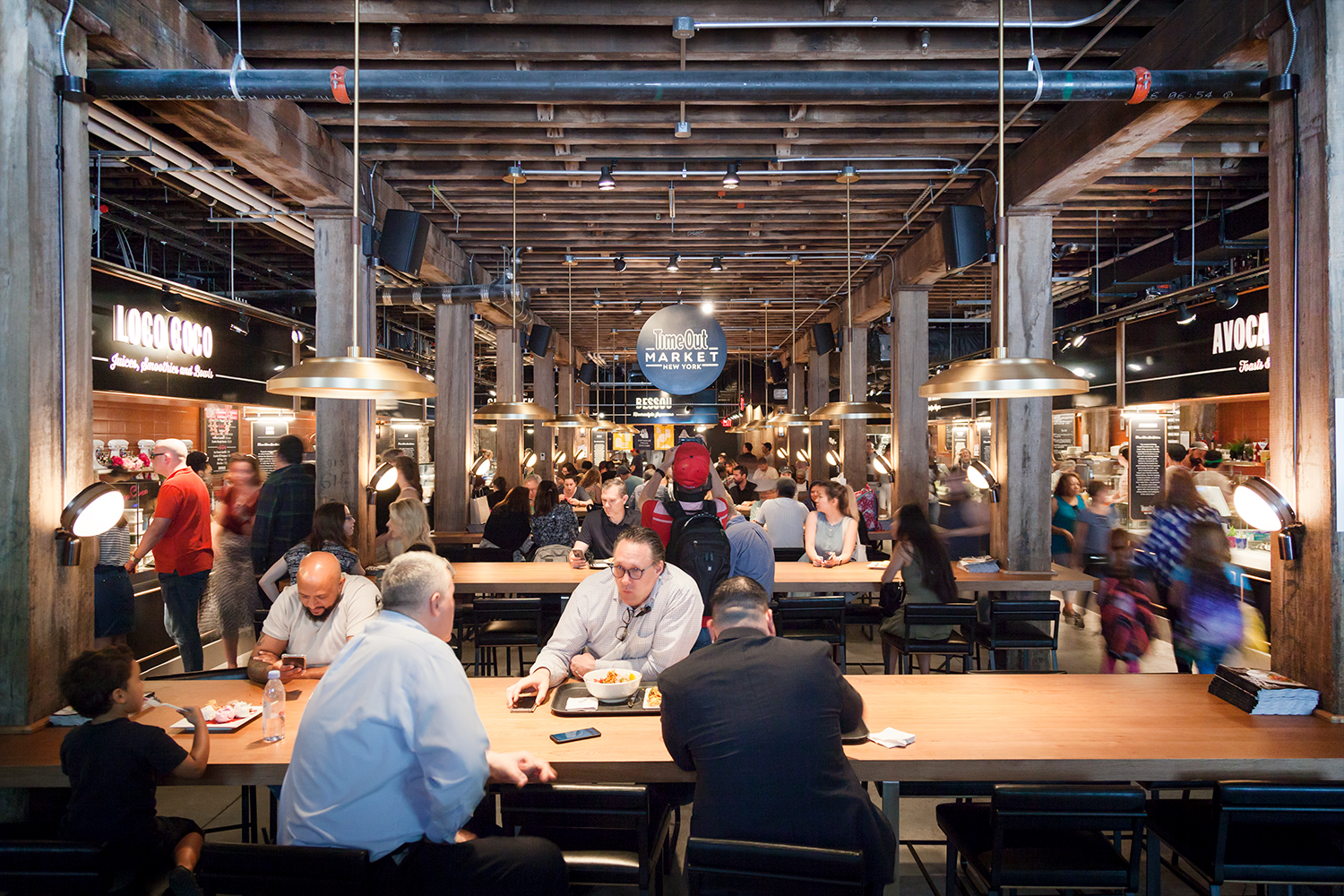
Time Out Market in Empire Stores

=== Tech hub ===
Dumbo serves as a tech hub, and has New York City's highest concentration of technology firms by neighborhood. Dumbo is home to 25 percent of New York City-based tech firms. Within a 10-block radius are 500 tech and creative firms that employ over 10,000 people. It also contains the corporate headquarters for e-commerce retailer Etsy and home furnishing stores company West Elm.

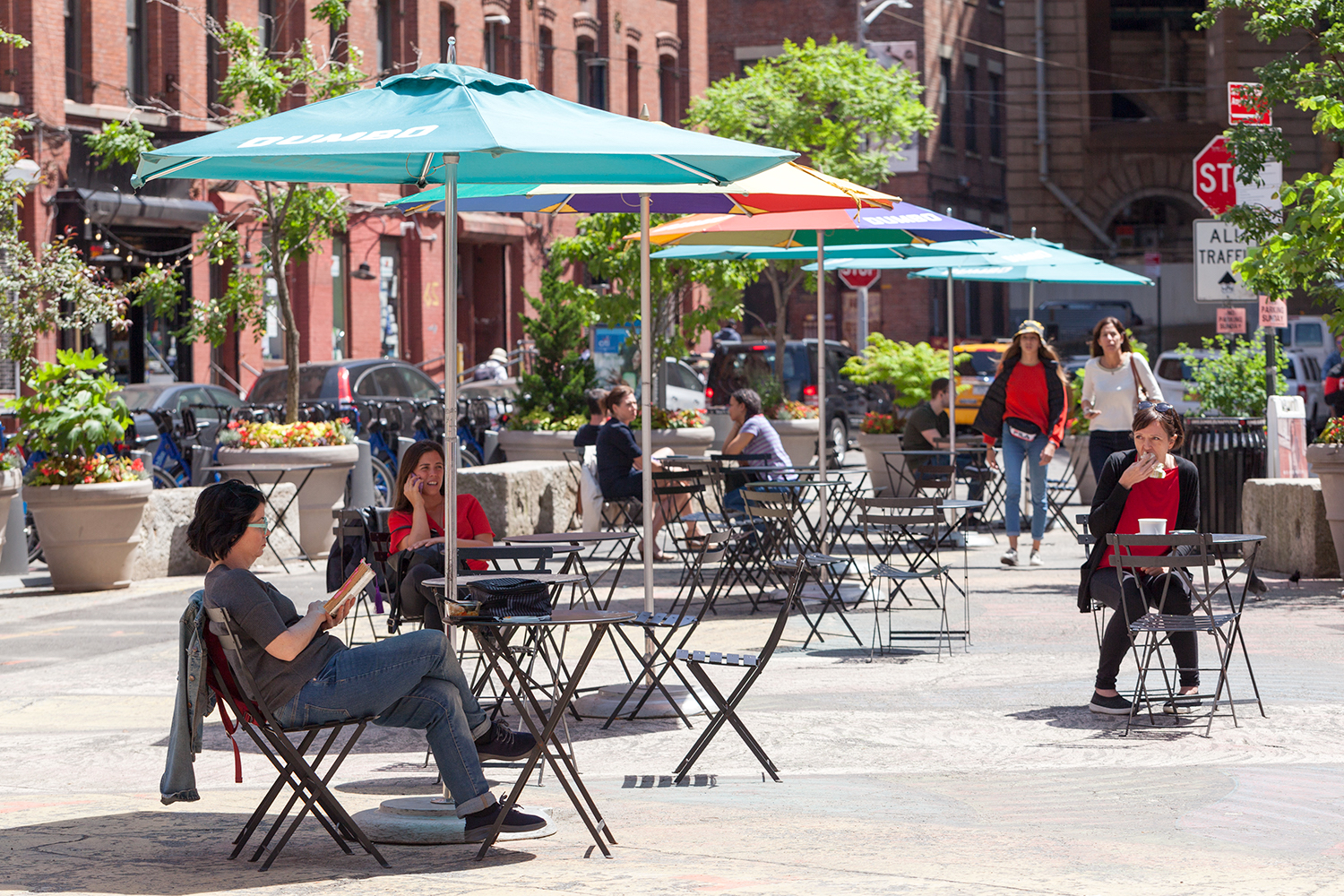
Pearl Street pocket park in Dumbo (2019)

The City of New York, in conjunction with New York University, installed an incubator in Dumbo to support development of tech start-ups. Dumbo's average office rent of US$25 per square foot ($269/m^{2}) made it (as of 2013) more attractive to start-ups than Manhattan, where rents averaged $40 per square foot ($431/m^{2}) in 2013.

=== Housing ===
The neighborhood contains the Farragut Houses, a group of ten towers managed by the New York City Housing Authority.

== Transportation ==
New York City Subway stations are located at York Street (F and <F> trains) on the IND Sixth Avenue Line, and High Street (A and C trains) on the IND Eighth Avenue Line. New York City Bus service is provided by the B25, B67, B69.

Ramps and staircases connect the Brooklyn Bridge and Manhattan Bridge walkways to Dumbo.

In June 2011, NY Waterway started service to points along the East River. On May 1, 2017, that route became part of the NYC Ferry's East River route, which runs between Pier 11/Wall Street in Manhattan's Financial District and the East 34th Street Ferry Landing in Murray Hill, Manhattan, with five intermediate stops in Brooklyn and Queens. One of the East River Ferry's stops is at Fulton Ferry in Dumbo.

== Education ==
=== Public library ===
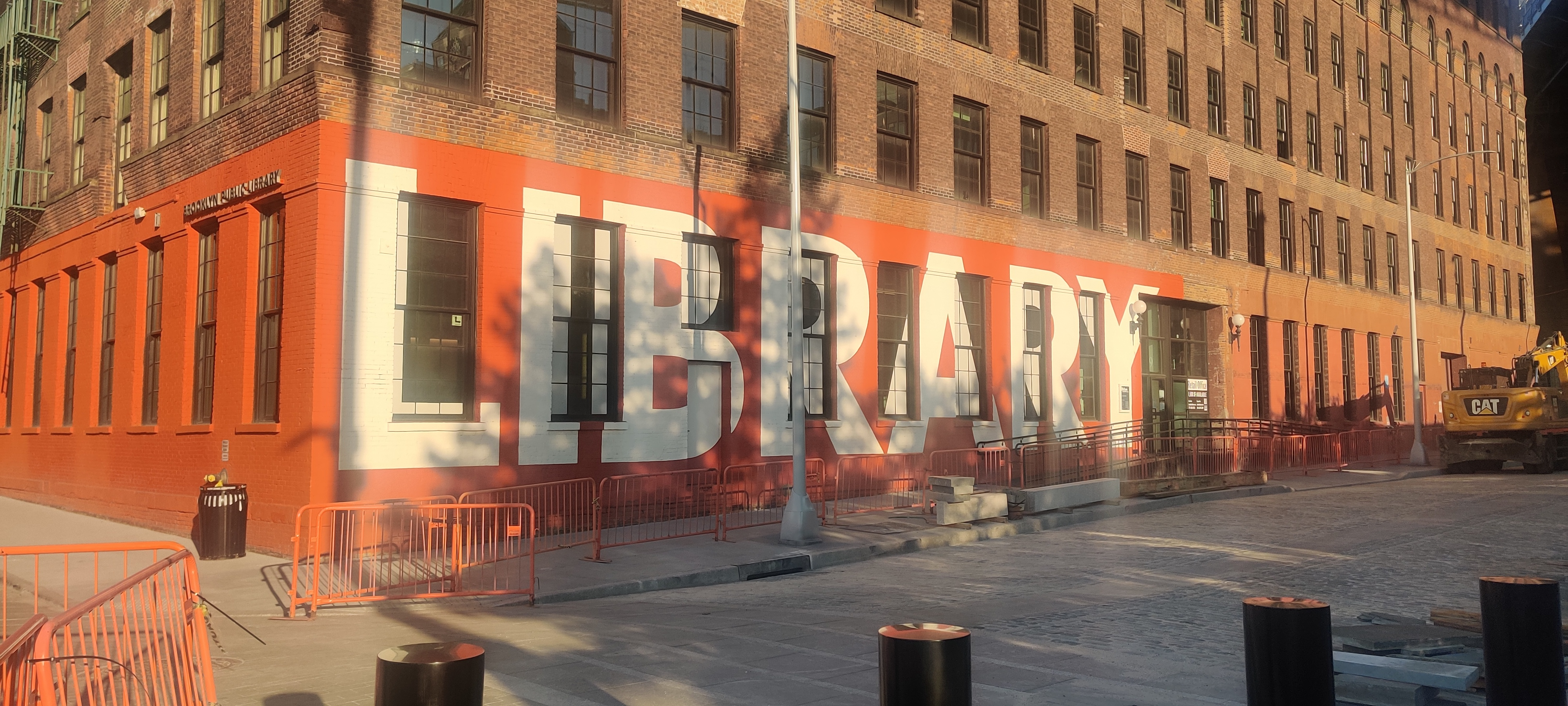
Adams Street library branch

The Brooklyn Public Library (BPL)'s Adams Street branch is located at 9 Adams Street, between John and Plymouth Streets. The 6,000-square-foot (560 m^{2}) Adams Street branch, designed by WORKac, occupies a former factory. The branch started construction in 2020 and cost $7 million to build. It opened in October 2021 and was the first BPL branch to open in Brooklyn since 1983.

== In popular culture ==
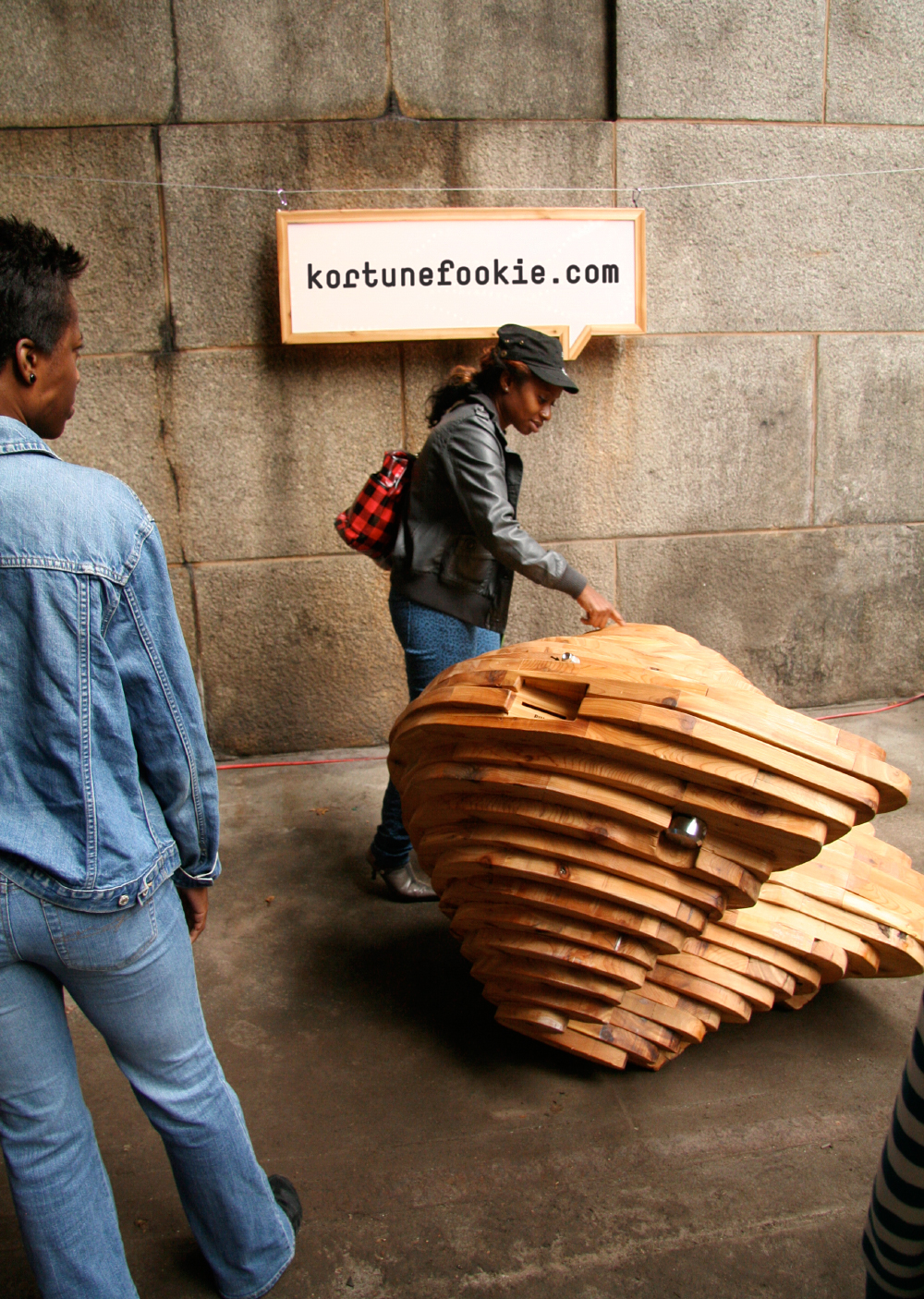
Kortunefookie at Art Under The Bridge in Dumbo

- The view of the Manhattan Bridge, looking north from the corner of Washington Street and Water Street, has become an iconic image associated with Sergio Leone's last film, Once Upon a Time in America. Several scenes were filmed in this area, and the view appears on the poster for the film.
- Jerry Seinfeld referred to Dumbo during an appearance on Late Show with David Letterman, joking that it stands for "Down Under Manhattan Bridge", but that New Yorkers added the "O" at the end because they did not want to live in a neighborhood called "Dumb".
- Bananarama's music video for the 1984 song "Cruel Summer" was filmed primarily in the Dumbo section of New York City's Brooklyn borough in mid-1983. It opens with a shot of Manhattan in the background, including the decade-old World Trade Center.
- The neighborhood is parodied in Grand Theft Auto IV as BOABO ("Beneath the Off-ramp of the Algonquin Bridge Overpass").
- Dumbo appears in several episodes of Gotham Season 2.
- Dumbo is referenced on the Jay-Z track "The Story of O.J." on the album 4:44, as Shawn Carter raps about a missed opportunity when he was younger to purchase a now valuable building in the neighborhood.
- In addition, Dumbo is a popular location for Instagram posts, and The New York Times has referred it to "the most Instagrammable neighborhood in America".
- The Battlefield 6 map "Manhattan Bridge" takes place in Dumbo. In addition, a mission in the campaign also takes place in the neighborhood.

== Gallery ==
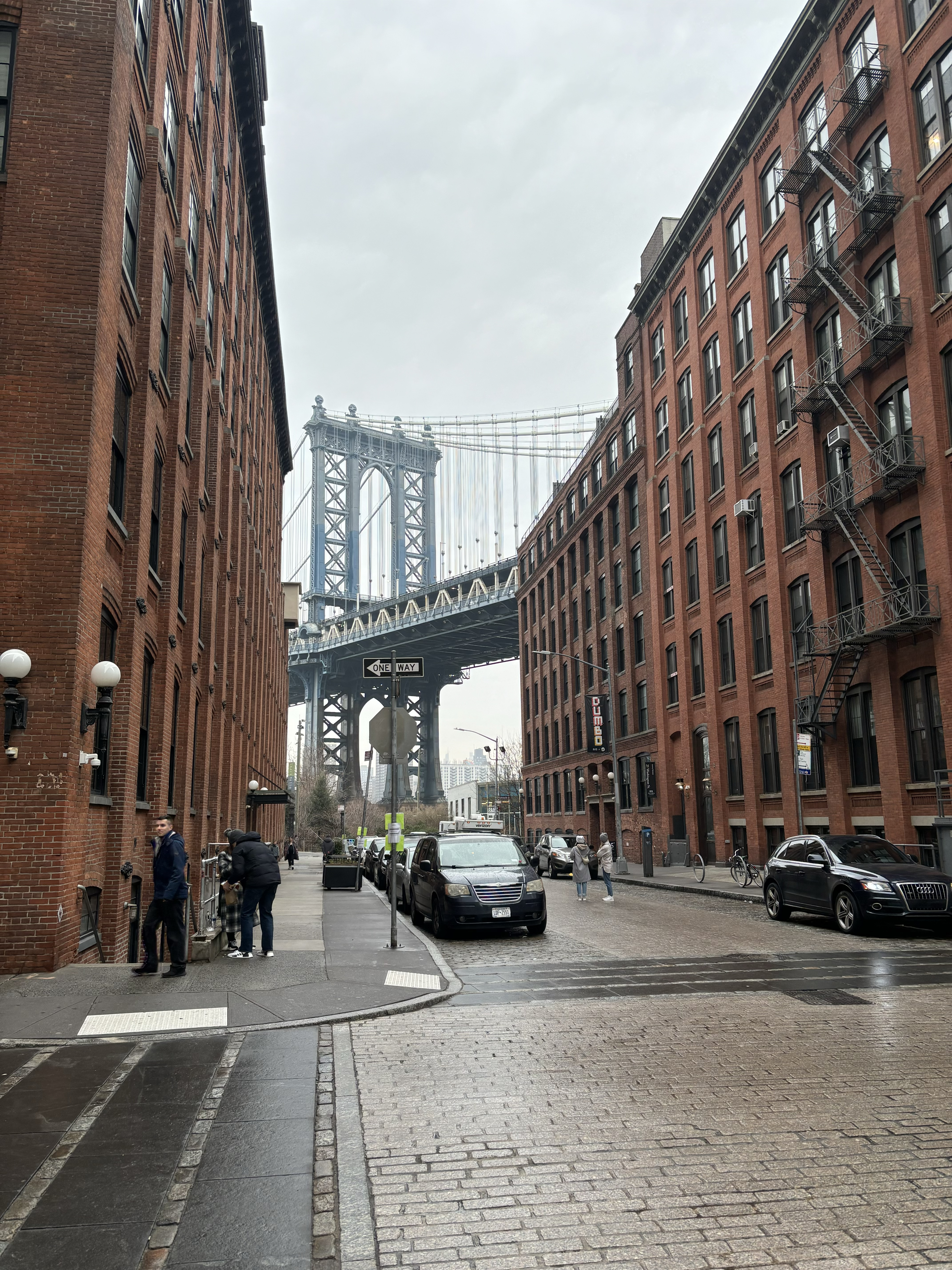
The Manhattan Bridge via Washington Street (Red Bricks)

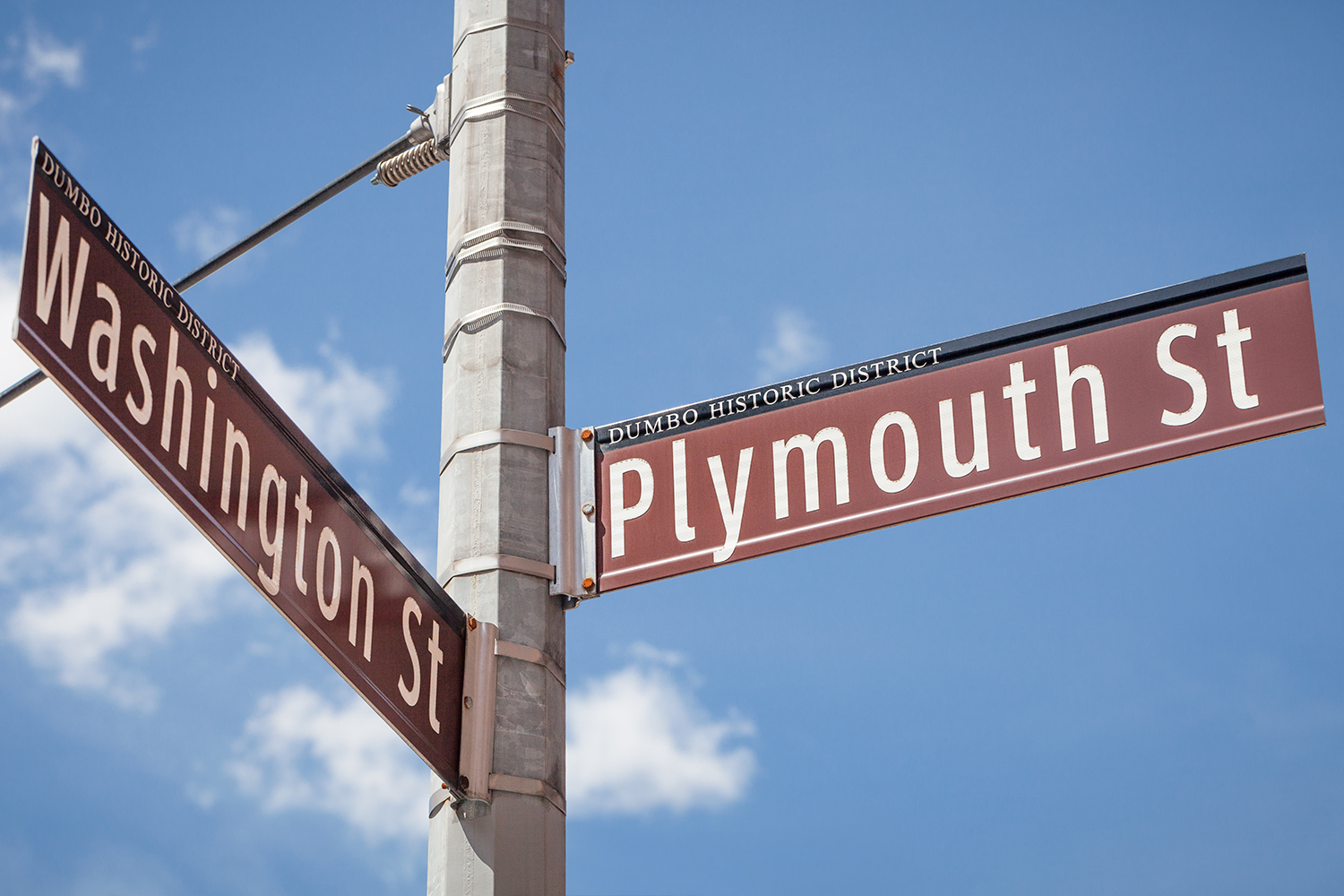
DUMBO Historic District street signs

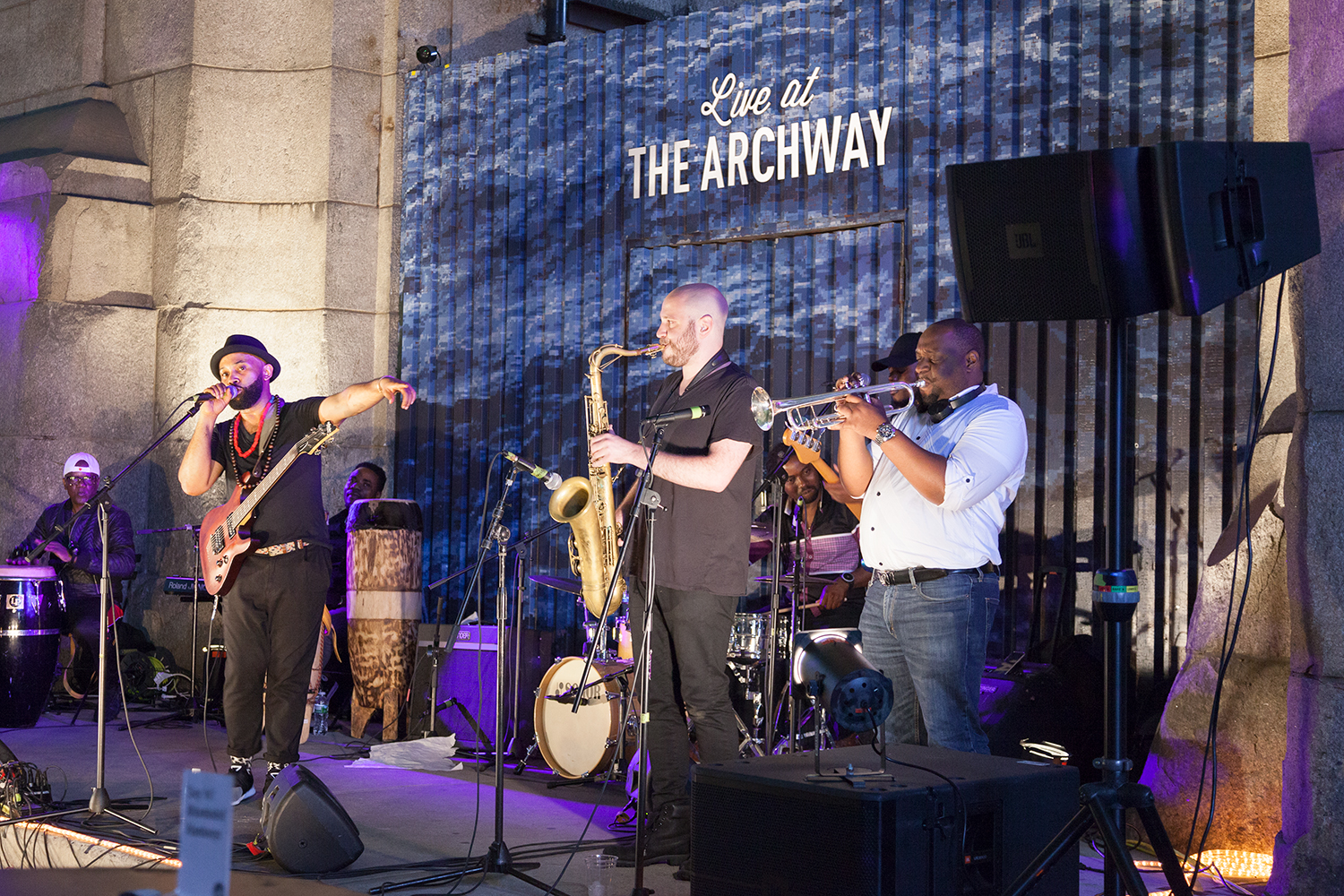
Summer opening of "Live at The Archway"

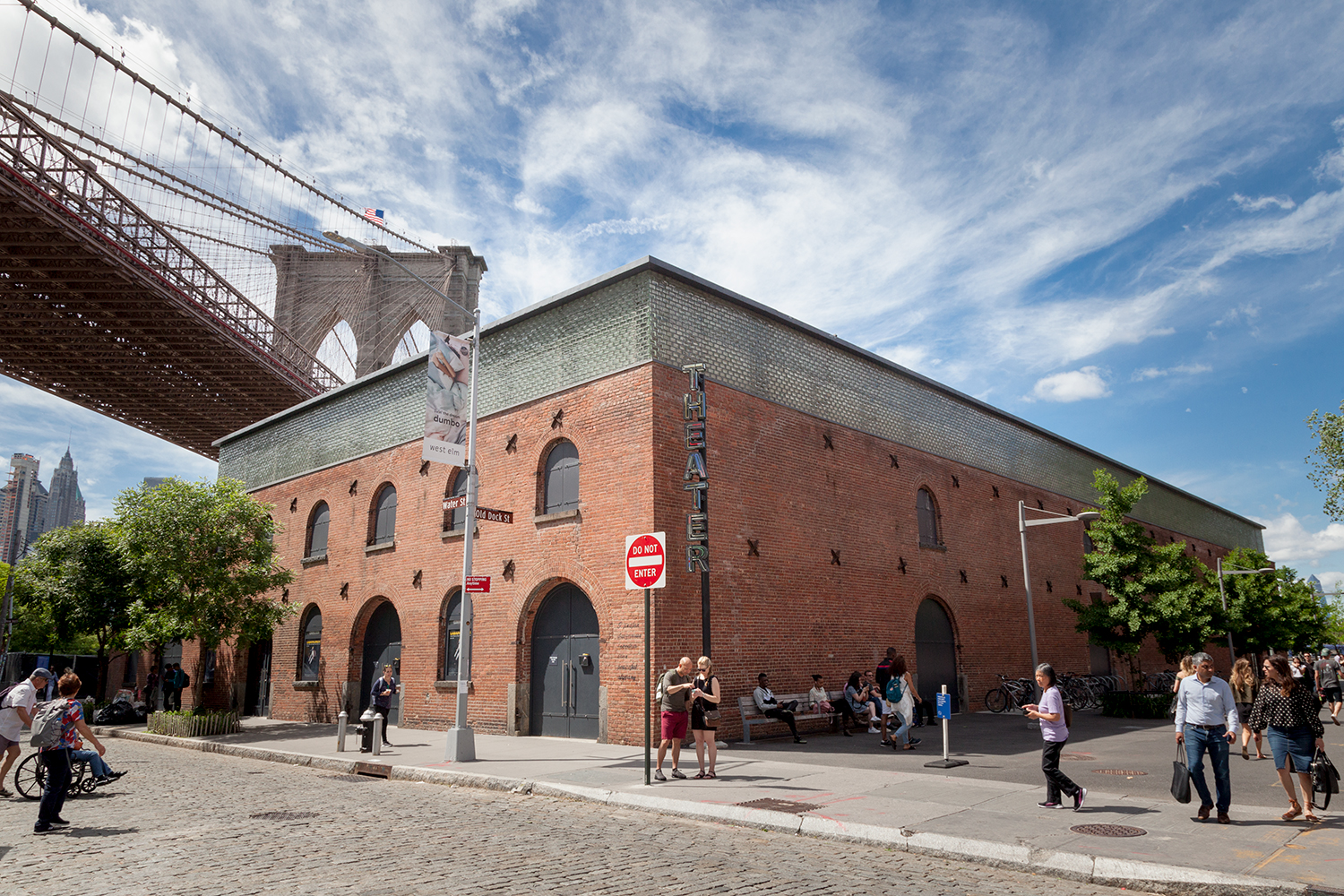
St. Ann's Warehouse

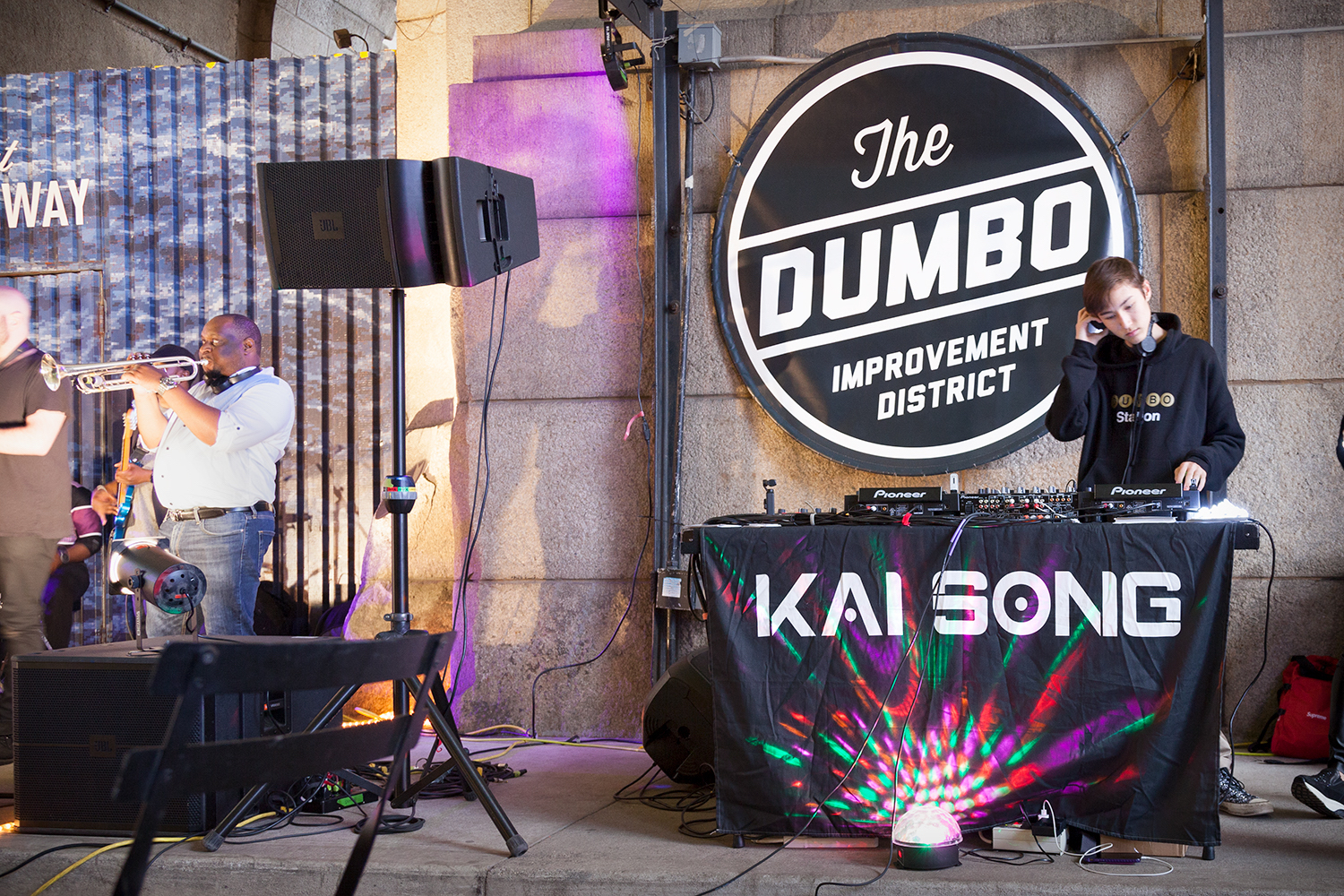
"Live at the Archway" is hosted by DUMBO BID every Thursday evening in the summer.

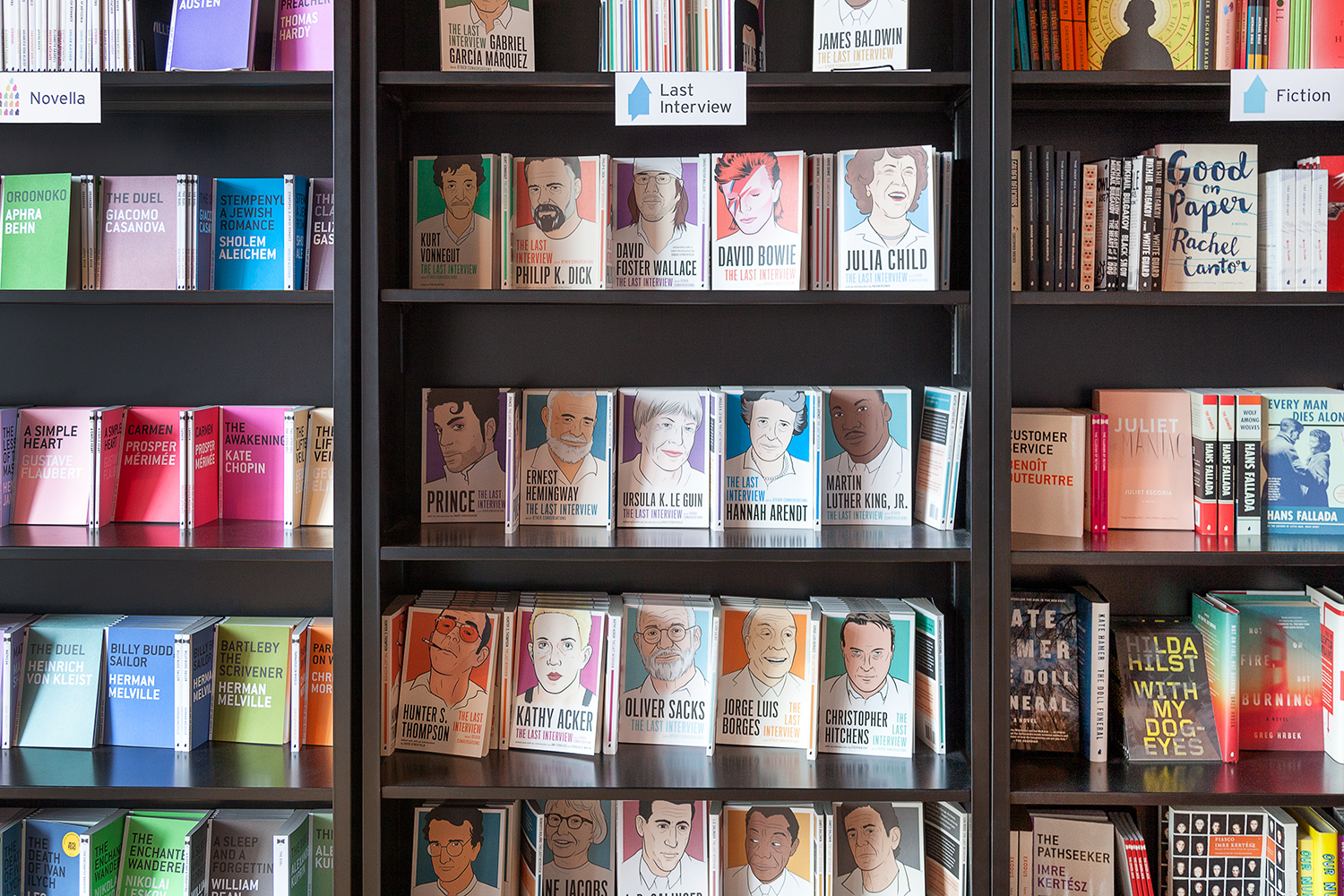
Melville House Bookstore on John Street

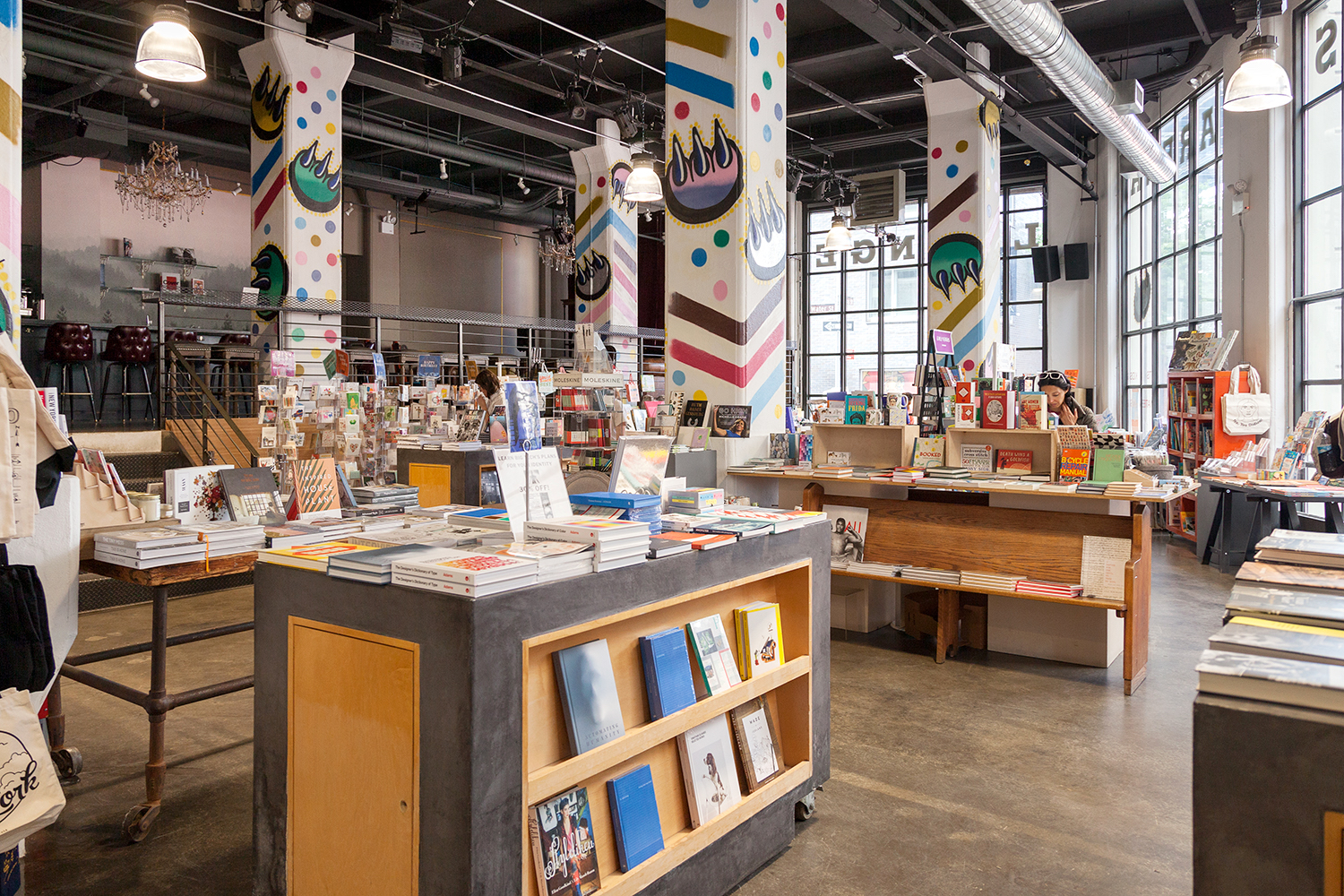
Powerhouse Arena Bookstore on Adams Street

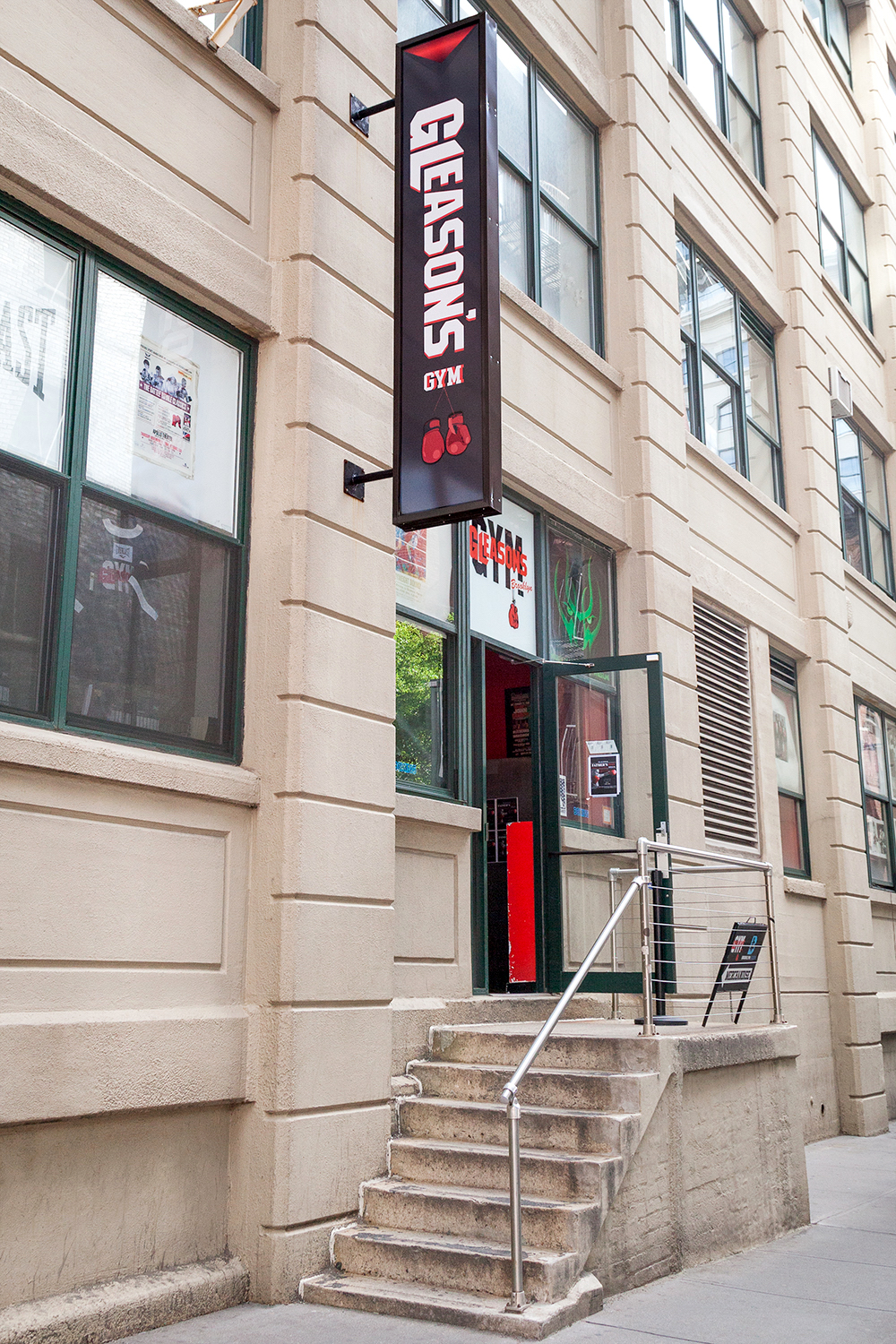
Gleason's Gym on Water Street

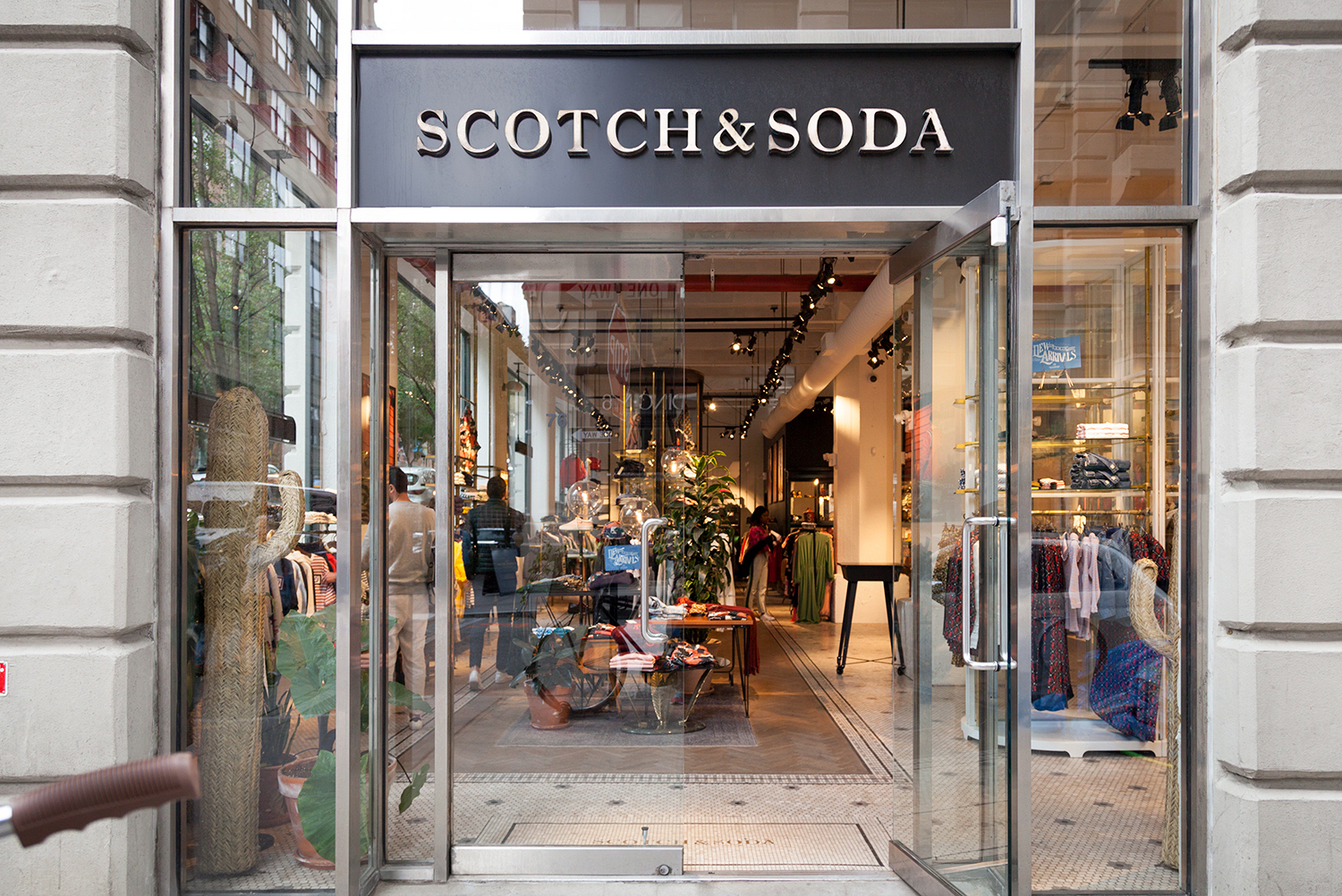
Scotch & Soda on Front Street
