= Kortunefookie =

Public art installation in New York City

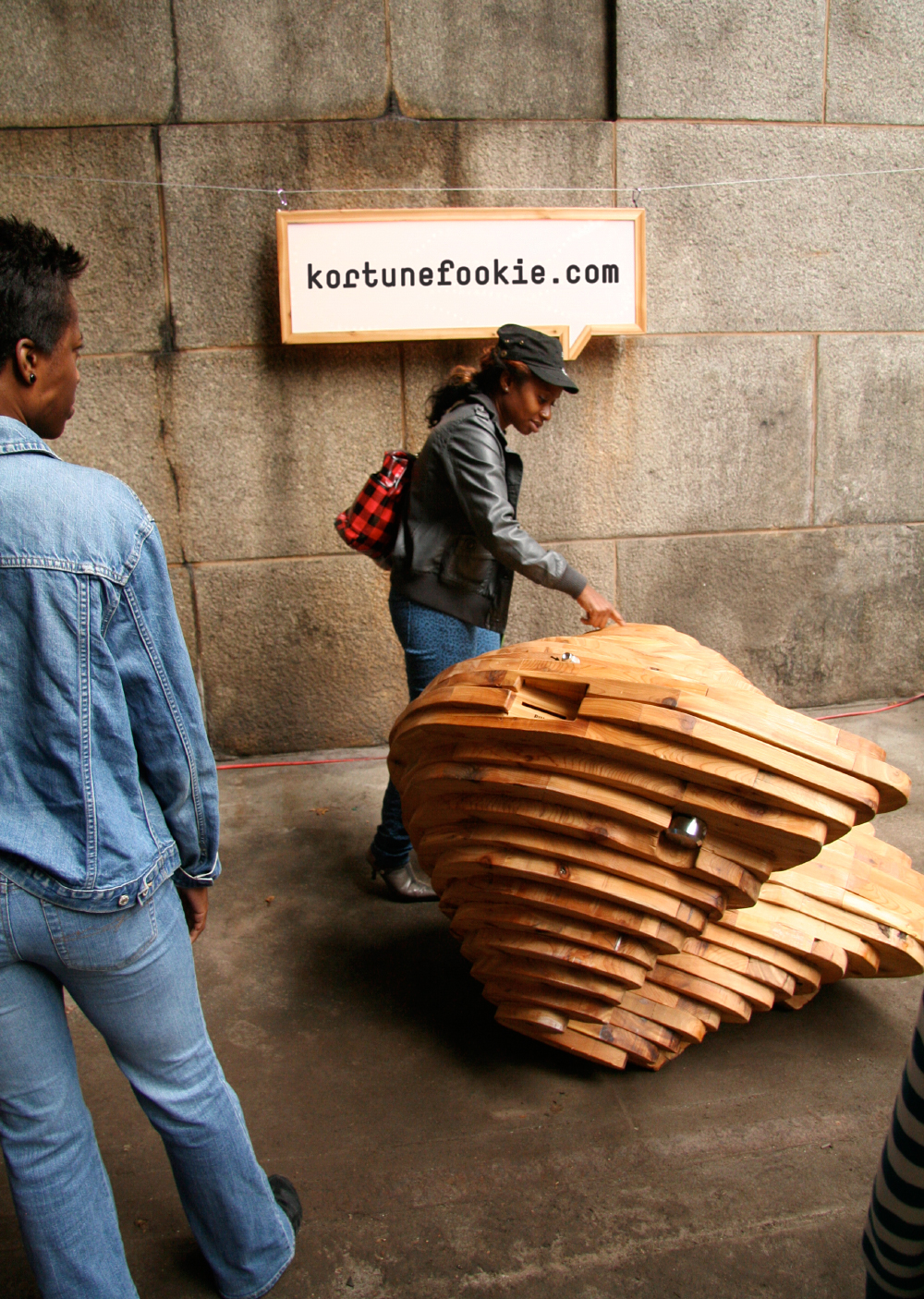
Exhibit at Art Under The Bridge, in Dumbo, Brooklyn, New York City, September 2008

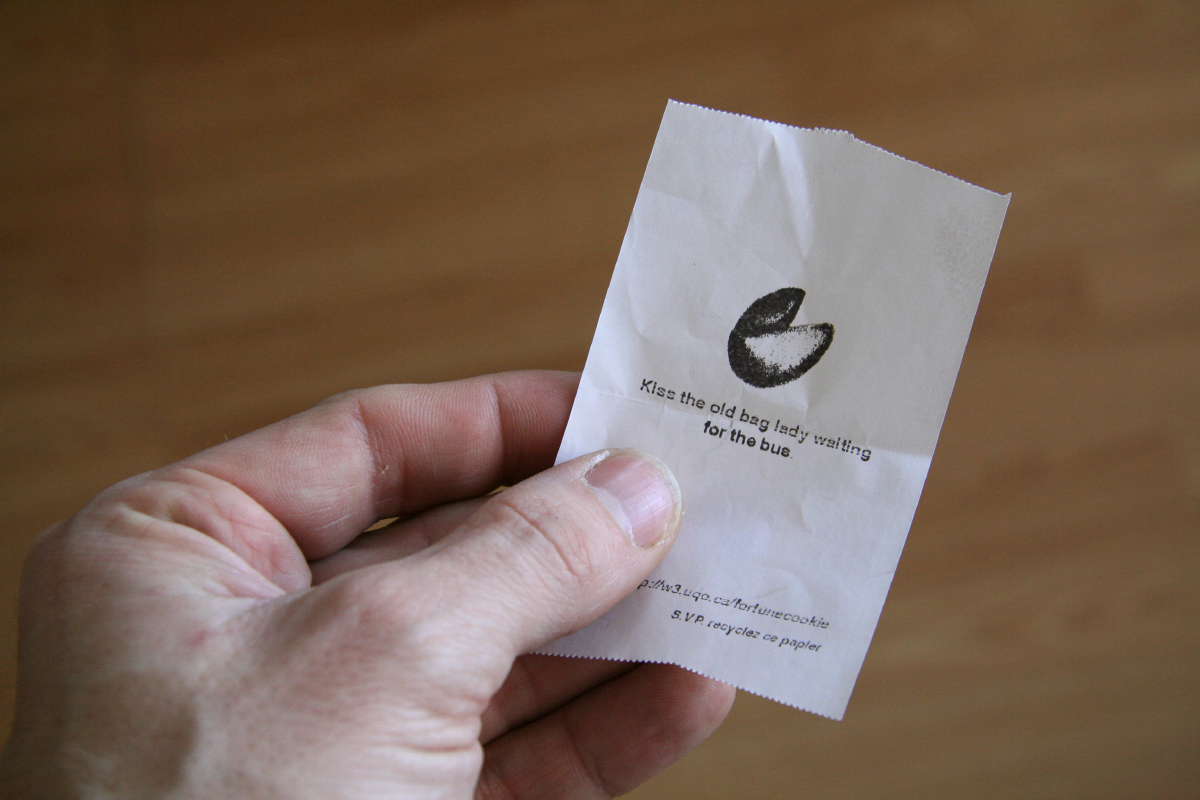
Printed receipt obtained from the kortunefookie

Kortunefookie is an interactive public art project, a large scale 4-foot (1 m) high fortune cookie made of red cedar, which grants users a printed fortune with a simple touch of a button; Kortunefookie's social network creates the fortunes via the project's Web site. Inspired by the idea of the fortune cookie, the project was created to permit different users to share their thoughts and create a new kind of social ties. It is an interactive kiosk that issues short texts written by anonymous users on the Kortunefookie website that resemble the messages found in the fortune cookies, but each fortune from the Kortunefookie is different, unlike mass-produced fortunes in regular fortune cookies. Kortunefookie's Web site suggest users to send an innermost secret, a smarmiest wisecrack, a private prayer, or an outlandish prediction.

Kortunefookie has two parts: one that utilizes the Web 2.0 to gather the texts from the public, and the other that consists of an interactive sculptural installation (the interactive kiosk). The fortunes are submitted by the public via the project's website then stored into an XML database. Once moderated, these texts are uploaded on the computer's custom application housed inside the interactive wooden kiosk. This sculptural kiosk is weather proof and designed to be installed just about anywhere outdoors. Anyone visiting the on-site interactive sculpture can push a button and receive a small paper that contains a printed original message. These fortunes are printed using a thermal receipt printer, a type of paper that resembles a retail receipt.

== History ==
Created in 2008 as part of a research creation project funded by the University of Quebec in Outaouais, the creative team included professor Jean-François Lacombe from the Multidisciplinary Image School and Christian Desjardins, his research assistant and student at the time. The project's ambition was to allow different users to interact and post messages on the public realm. From the beginning, the endeavour intended to be a multidisciplinary creation that would act both as an art installation and as an interactive medium to communicate. A challenge for the team was to render the complex technology used invisible, letting the experience generated by the device dominate (as describe by John Maeda, in his book The Laws of Simplicity, MIT Press, 2006). As the team wanted a seamless operation and to facilitate the use of the interactive sculpture, a familiar image had to be associated to the new device. After a period of research and development, the team came up with the idea to utilize the image of the fortune cookies.

=== Construction and programming ===
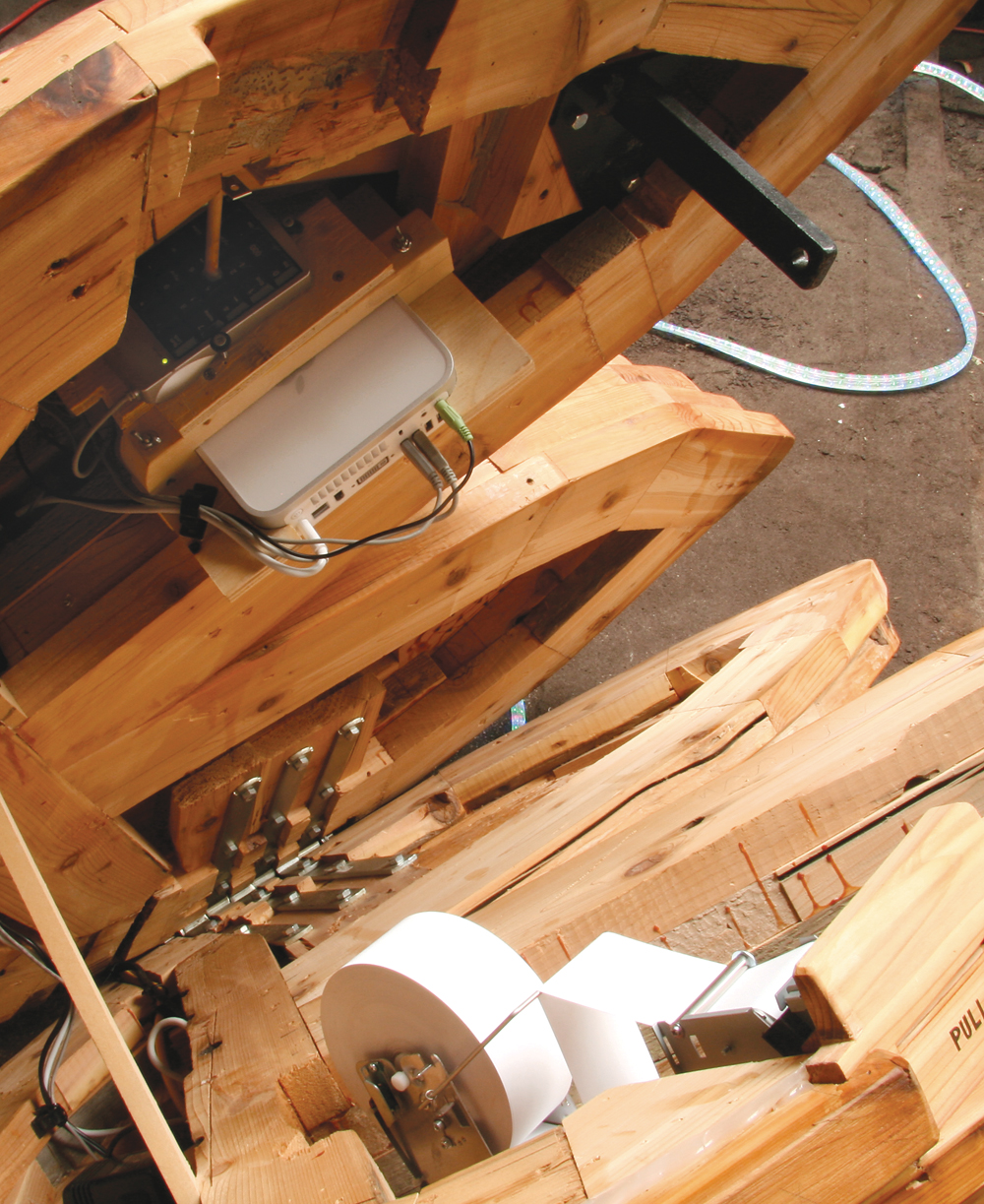
Insides of the interactive kiosk.

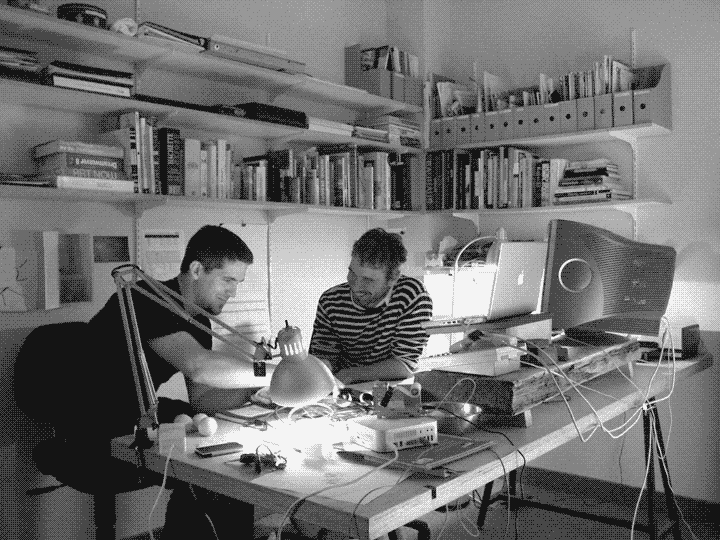
Kortunefookie's founding team at work

Shortly after finalizing the usage design, the construction of the interactive kiosk prototype and then development of the application began simultaneously. The prototype was made with slabs of pink Styrofoam that measured one and a half inches thick. Once the desired form and scale had been achieved, the model was dismantled so that each Styrofoam layer could be reproduced in wood in the same dimensions. It was then just a matter of assembling all the layers of wood to form the hollow sculpture. Francis Boivin, then a visual arts student at the University of Quebec in Outaouais, greatly contributed to the making of the wooden sculpture. The final fortune cookie sculpture is made entirely from salvaged Western red cedar logs that were once telephone poles.

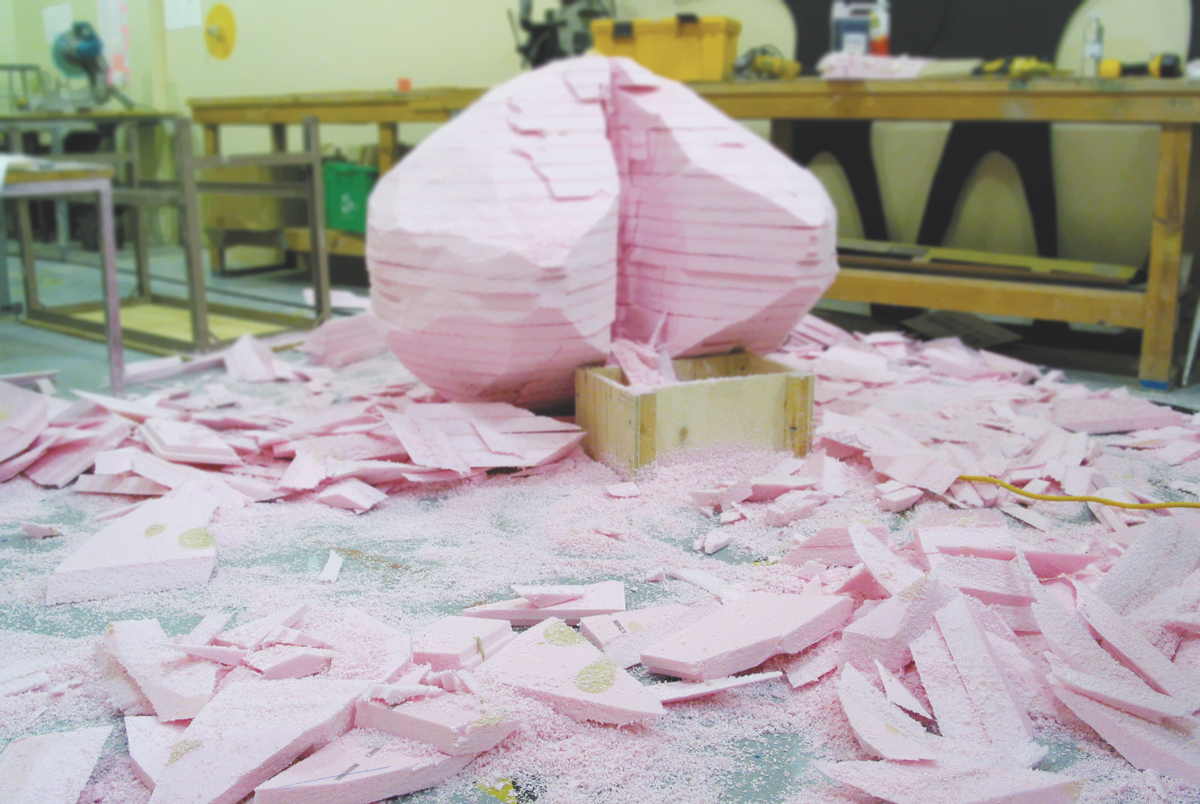
Kortunefookie's styrofoam prototype

The customized application that prints the fortune was built on a Mac Mini (1.83 GHz Core 2 Duo/1GB/80GB/Combo) with the programming interface Cocoa (API) and development tools Apple Xcode and Interface Builder. It was mainly programmed by Justin McKillican. Lastly, speakers were installed inside the fortune cookie so that a 10-second synthesized melody could be heard each time the button was pressed. This also allowed to manage the intervals between each text so that it was impossible for a continuous cascade of paper to be printed.

Finally, using the CMS SPIP, the Web site was conceived to act both as a promotional tool as well as the text collecting interface. In this project, the Web was the obvious “drop point” for messages as it allowed anyone anywhere to participate in the creation of the fortunes. It also permits for the sent messages to be filtered out. Specifically those that were distasteful, promotional, or aimed at specific individuals.

Statistics for the texts so far are:

- French texts received: 641+
- English texts received: 1,312+
- Texts printed: 22,000+

=== Etymology ===
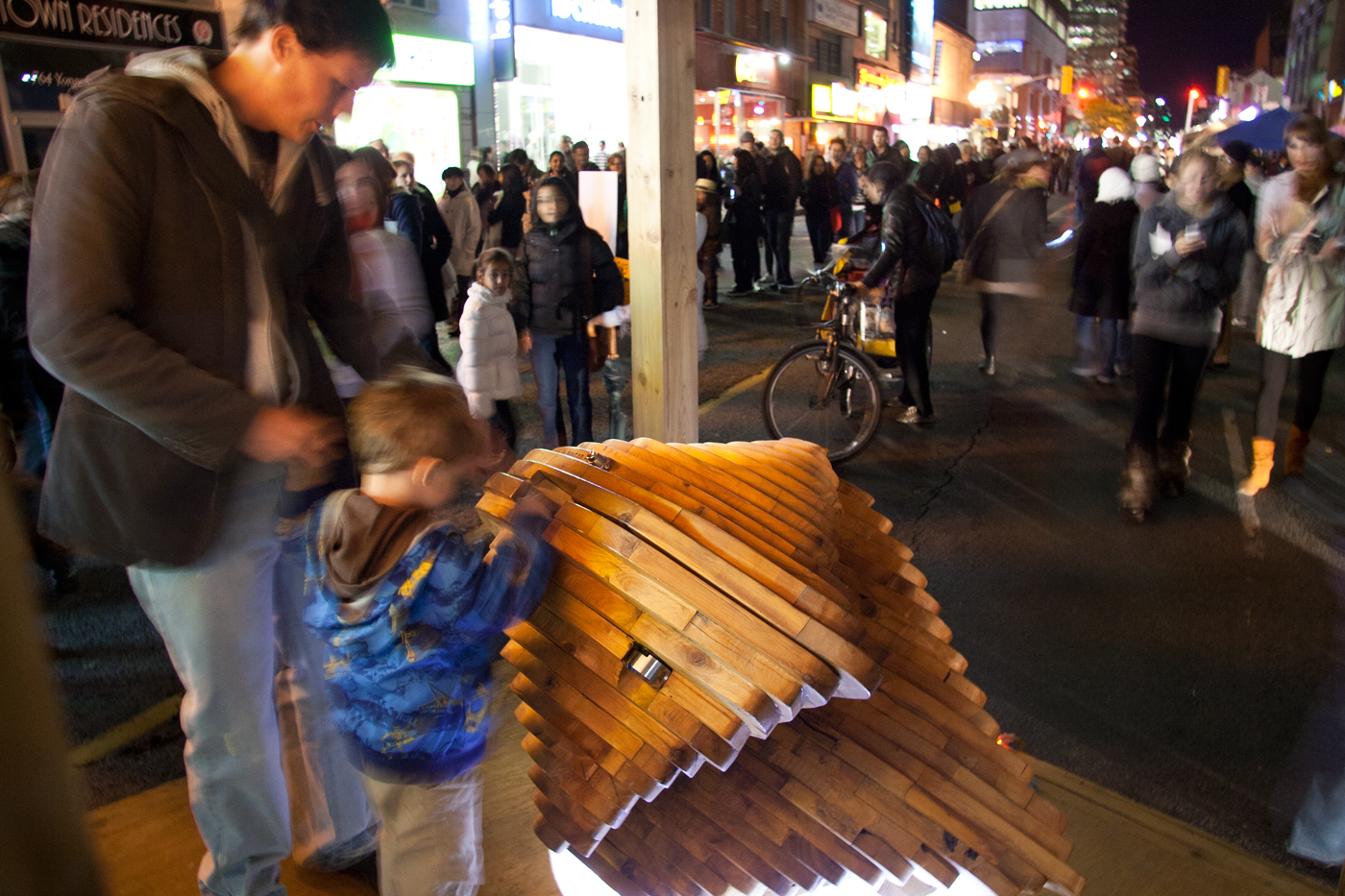
Exhibit at La Scotiabank Nuit Blanche, Toronto 2010.

For its first showing at the Arts Under The Bridge Festival in New York City (organized by Brooklyn artist-run centre DAC), the project was entitled SensGoodKarma. However, this title restricted the editorial line as well as the public's scope for intervention. Several brainstorming sessions to find a new name proved fruitless until, one evening in 2009, Chris Zeke Hand exclaimed, “Kortunefookie!”, inspiring the permanent name of the project.

=== Credits and funding ===
Main collaborators for the project include Christian Desjardins, Justin McKillican and Francis Boivin. Funding provided by the institutional fund for research creation development (FIRC). A book about the project, called Kortunefookie, tale of an interactive cookie, has been published in summer 2011. Limited to 100 numbered editions, this publication includes texts, photographs, and illustrations by Jean-François Lacombe, François Chalifour, Christian Desjardins, Mamoru Kobayakawa, and Marie-Hélène Leblanc.

== Objectives and critical perspective ==
The objective of the project, as stated by its creator, was the establishment of a communication tool that would act as an intermediary between the public's imagination and that of its users. Kortunefookie was a kind of a contemporary divination device, allowing thousands of users to share and come in contact with an intimate thought of someone else. This necessity for communication, or the intimacy of communication as proposed by Kortunefookie, is reiterated by François Chalifour :
«Isolation is unattractive, it bothers us. It holds up traffic. To correct the situation, we must fill the space that separates things, beings. Communication, for as long as it has existed, has proved to be a privileged means of closing this chasm: attract attention, open the channels of communication, exchange the message. In all sorts of ways, Lacombe’s odd-looking box, lying by the side of the road outside an art gallery, speaks to us of a trend whose results remain, to this day, ambiguous. Have we bridged the gap, have we filled the void, have we crossed the gulf that separates us? Jean-François Lacombe is working on it.»

Excerpt taken from the article Kortunefookie, Horro Vacui, written by François Chalifour, previously published in the magazine Espace Sculpture 90, Hiver 2009/2010. translation: Sarah Knight.

== Exhibitions ==
- 2008 at the 12th Arts Under the Bridge festival in Dumbo, New York City.
- 2009 at Articule gallery in Montreal, Canada.
- 2010 at the artists run center Daimon in Gatineau, Quebec.
- 2010 at the Toronto ScotiaBank Nuit Blanche.
- 2011 at the Art Souterrain, Montreal's Nuit Blanche.

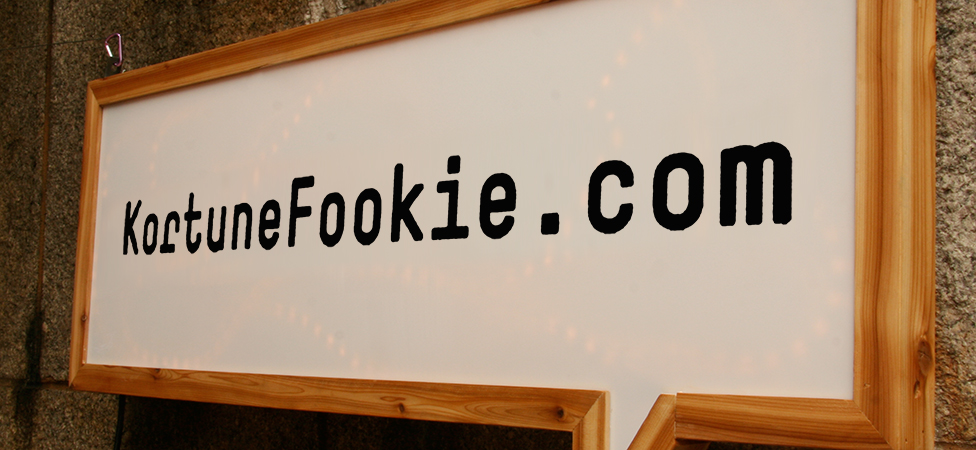
Signage for the project
