= Joy Glidden =

Canadian-American curator and television director

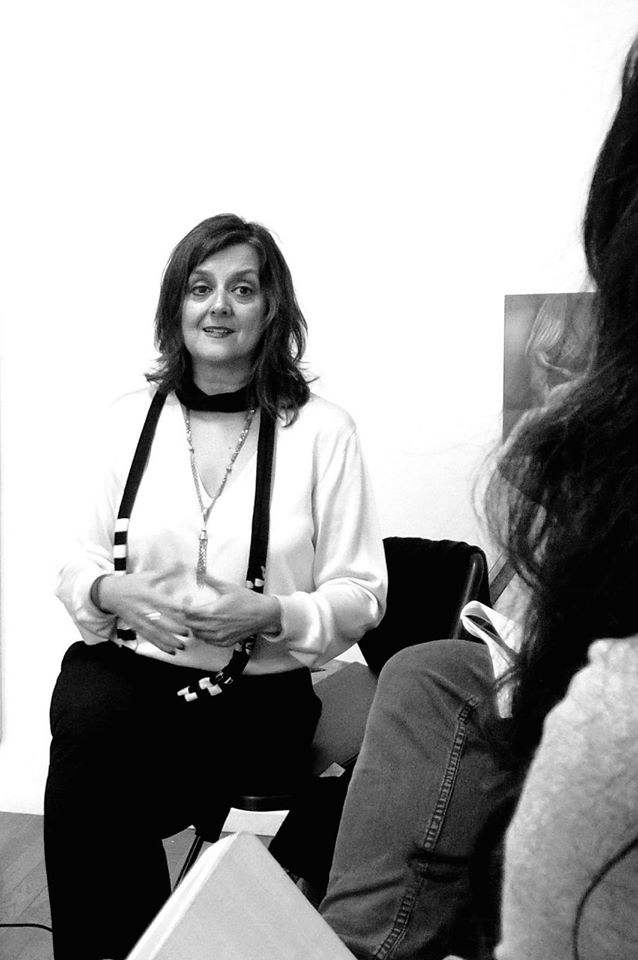
Joy Glidden lecture at Institut des hautes études en arts plastiques (IHEAP), 2015

Joy Glidden (born 1960 in Moncton, New Brunswick) is a founding director, curator, television director, and senior executive in the non-profit visual arts field. She currently resides in Brooklyn, New York.

== Career ==
Glidden is best known as the founder of the Dumbo Art Under the Bridge Festival (1997), and founder of the DUMBO Arts Center (1998). She was the director of New Orleans–based nonprofit Louisiana ArtWorks, (2007 –2010) founding director of Art Index TV (Since 2010) and senior advisor to the Northern New England Museum of Contemporary Art (NNE MoCA)/Northern New England Artist Legacy Project (NNE ALP) (2017–2020). Glidden is the lead consultant and founder of the Center for the Preservation of Artists' Legacies (CPAL) (Since 2020).

She served on the Prospect New Orleans. Honorary Committee Member, and on the Board of Directors of ArtTable as the National VP of Programs. She currently serves on the Advisory Committee to Harlem Burial Ground, Harlem, New York.

Glidden is known for her entrepreneurial design of innovative programs and unique infrastructure build-out within the non-profit sector. She has given talks on developing non-profit art organizations for New York University, 92nd Street Y, and the Pratt Institute, lectured on entrepreneurship in the arts at Appalachian State University, and on professional career development for artists at the Maryland Institute College of Art (MICA) and Louisiana State University. Glidden has also lectured on the positive economic effects of an artist's community with the Danish, Norwegian, and Korean Consulates.

=== Early years ===
Born and raised in Moncton, New Brunswick, Canada, Glidden began her career in modern dance in the 1970s, culminating as a principal for the Atlantic Dance Theater (1975–79). She credits her early years in dance and choreography with the development of discipline, organizational and creative problem-solving — skill sets that were applied to political activism and later to work as a visual artist (1980–1998). Glidden moved to New York City in 1987, and to Dumbo in 1990 with her partner, author Darius James (married 1994, divorced 1998).

=== Non-profit arts advocacy ===
Glidden founded the Dumbo Art Under the Bridge Festival in cooperation with Tyson Daugherty, who helped oversee the event's inaugural year before departing for other projects. Glidden went on to structure the festival and create the DUMBO Arts Center, which spearheaded the festival until 2010. Glidden served as the executive director of both entities from 1997 to 2006. From 2011 to 2014, Two Trees Management oversaw the festival until it was pronounced too big to prevail. The festival had a direct impact on the development of the Brooklyn waterfront.

The socio-political and economic conditions for visual artists in the 1990s were dire. The DUMBO Art Under the Bridge Festival helped frame the artist's identity as that of a significant contributor to society through personalized public introduction and celebration. Most importantly, the festival brought art collectors directly into the artist studios without the supervision of gallerists. This dramatic shift helped artists realize the studio as a place of commerce, simultaneously introducing the next generation to new audiences. DAC and the festival drew upwards of 250,000 spectators and were supported by David and Jane Walentas, Two Trees Management.

In 2006 Glidden relocated to New Orleans, Louisiana accepting the position of director of Louisiana ArtWorks (LAW), a stunning 93,000 square foot (8,600 m^{2}) artist service organization (2007–2010). LAW had been shuttered by the municipal government one year prior to Hurricane Katrina and paralyzed by a substantial funding deficit. Under Glidden's leadership LAW opened for programming and successful revenue streams were achieved. The organization launched artist residencies, art programming for at-risk youth, exhibitions, panel discussions, and print, ceramic, and metalworking programs. Glidden departed the organization in order to focus on her new project, Art Index TV.

In 2009 Glidden was approached by a local PBS producer to director a series on contemporary art. Art Index TV was conceived as a television series of half-hour shows that examines the ways in which art impacts our culture. AITV was the second television series on contemporary art at that time. The program has been distributed on PBS an Kanopy. It is also available on Alexander Street Inc.

In 2014 to 2015, Glidden worked with the community organizations Northside Town Hall Community and Cultural Center in cooperation with the People's Firehouse as consulting director, designing the capital campaign which culminated in a hard hat party in the now complete Williamsburg Hotel that brought 90 of New York's top developers together.

Glidden's current project is the Center for the Preservation of Artists' Legacies (CPAL). CPAL is an innovative solution addressing the urgent legacy challenges facing under-known artists of excellence and their lives' work. It seeks to address a national crisis of historic and unprecedented cultural consequence by developing strategies to promote equity in the stewardship of individual artist legacies, through innovative cross-disciplinary solutions.
