= Université du Québec en Outaouais =

University in Gatineau, Quebec

- University of Quebec in Outaouais
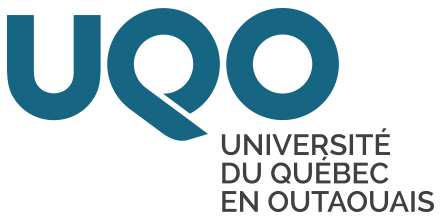
- Motto: Être plus près, aller plus loin
- Motto in English: Being closer, going further
- Type: Constituent university
- Established: 1981; 45 years ago
- Academic affiliations: ACCC, CCAA, QSSF
- Rector: Murielle Laberge
- Administrative staff: 565 (175 full-time professors)
- Students: 6,017
- Undergraduates: 4,738
- Postgraduates: 1,279
- Location: Gatineau and Saint-Jérôme, Quebec, Canada
- Colours: Blue
- Nickname: Torrents
- Website: uqo.ca

The Université du Québec en Outaouais (pronounced [ynivɛʁsite dy kebɛk ɑ̃.n‿utawɛ], English: University of Quebec in Outaouais, UQO) is a constituent university of the Université du Québec system located in Gatineau, Quebec, Canada. As of September 2010, combined enrolment at UQO's Gatineau and Saint-Jérôme campuses was 6,017, of which 4,738 were undergraduates and 1,279 postgraduate students. UQO offers more than 100 programs of study, including 30 master's and 5 doctoral programs.

It was named after Quebec's Outaouais region. Outaouais borders Ottawa and is part of the National Capital Region, where a large proportion of the population is bilingual.

== History ==
The university was established in 1981 under the government of René Lévesque (Parti Québécois), although university courses had been available in the region since 1971 (delivered by the Services universitaires dans l'Outaouais, or SUO).

Formerly known as the Université du Québec à Hull (UQAH), UQO changed its name in 2002 when the cities of Hull, Gatineau, Aylmer, Masson-Angers and Buckingham were amalgamated to form the new City of Gatineau. The university's new name reflects the administrative region of Outaouais, in which it is based.

About 5,500 students enrol in UQO courses each year. While this is the lowest enrolment in the Université du Québec system, the number of students is steadily rising, creating demand for more courses, programs and resources. The academic staff comprises some 175 full-time professors and 565 lecturers.

In the past 25 years, UQO has granted close to 30,000 degrees. The university is also one of the main contributors to the qualified workforce in the region, along with Carleton University, University of Ottawa, La Cité collégiale, Algonquin College and the Cégep de l'Outaouais.

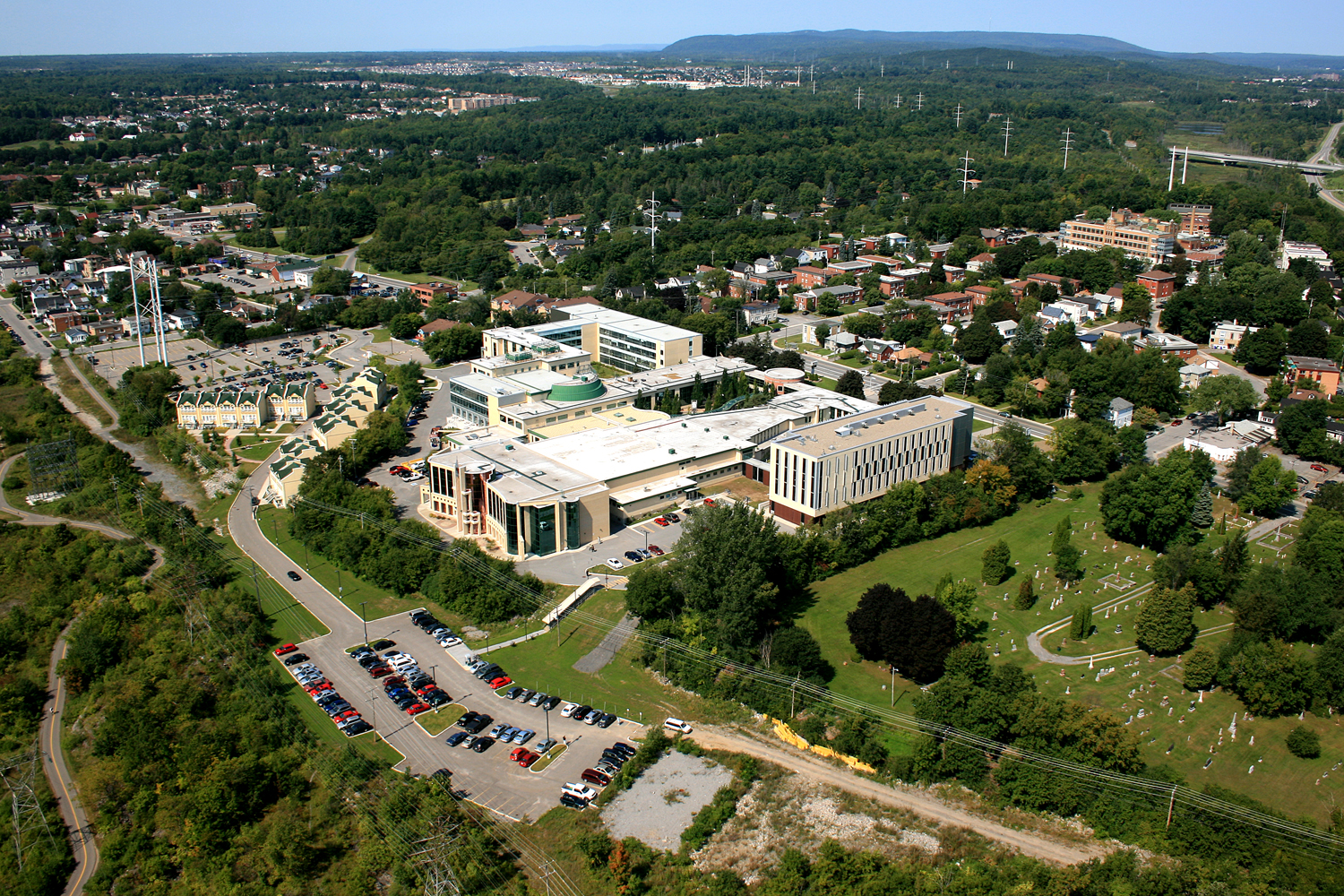
Université du Québec en Outaouais

== Fields of study ==
The Université du Québec en Outaouais (UQO) offers several different fields of study:

- Accounting science
- Administrative sciences
- Arts and heritage
- Computer science
- Education
- Labour relations and human resources
- Law
- Nursing
- Project management
- Psychoeducation
- Psychology
- Social sciences
- Social work
- Software engineering
- Translation and writing

== Main programs ==
UQO is the only university in Canada offering the following programs in French:

- Certificates:

- Visual arts
- Comic strip design
- Cybermuseology
- Graphic design
- Museology and heritage

- Bachelor's degrees:

- Arts and design
- Arts and heritage with majors and minors
- Majors:

- Comic strip design
- Graphic design
- Museology and heritage

- Minors:

- Approaches to education
- Visual arts
- Comic strip design
- Public communication (Social Sciences minor)
- Cybermuseology
- Graphic design
- Museology and heritage

- Administrative practices

- Master of advanced studies (diplôme d’études supérieures spécialisées, or DESS) in andragogy
- Short program in adult second-language and foreign-language instruction – French and Spanish streams

== Saint-Jérôme campus ==
UQO's Saint-Jérôme campus was inaugurated on January 22, 2010, at a ceremony attended by Michelle Courchesne, Québec Minister of Education, Recreation and Sports, Jean Vaillancourt, Rector of UQO, Marc Gascon, Mayor of Saint-Jérôme, Jacques Tanguay, President of Groupe AMT, and Sylvie Fréchette, Honorary Chair of the Fondation UQO fund-raising campaign. UQO | Campus de Saint-Jérôme is housed in a 1,013 m^{2} (10,900 sq ft) building at the corner of rue Saint-Joseph and rue Labelle, opposite the town hall. Enrolment at the new satellite campus is close to 1,000. The six-storey main building includes classrooms, teaching and research laboratories, a library, an educational resource centre, office and administrative space, student lounges and ancillary services such as a cafeteria and bookstore. On completion of the 400-day construction project, supervised by Groupe AMT, the building was delivered to the university du Québec en Outaouais at a pre-tax cost of $21,750,000. UQO's project was modelled on the partnership used by the Université du Québec à Rimouski (UQAR) for its Lévis campus, which was also built by Groupe commercial AMT under the direction of Jacques Tanguay. The building's architecture combines angles and curves to maximize the admission of natural light. On each floor is a windowed student work area. Staff members have access to a third-floor terrace that offers a view of Mount Royal on a clear day. The roof of this high-tech building features a solar wall that warms outside air before it is circulated indoors. The building, which will use 35% less energy than current Building Code standards, is awaiting LEED Silver certification. Groupe AMT will retain ownership for a period of 25 years, during which time it will be responsible for building management, maintenance and surveillance. The building will be transferred to UQO at the end of the 25-year lease. The Québec Ministry of Education, Recreation and Sports will provide an annual subsidy of $2.2 million over 25 years to cover the lease costs. This subsidy includes funding for construction costs and equipment acquisition for teaching spaces. The town of Saint-Jérôme also made a generous contribution by donating the land on which the building stands, valued at $1.5 million.

=== Programs offered at the Saint-Jérôme campus ===
The programs offered by UQO in Saint-Jérôme have been chosen to meet workforce renewal realities in the Laurentian region.

- Undergraduate programs:

- Bachelor of administration
- Bachelor of early childhood and primary education
- Bachelor of psychoeducation
- Bachelor of nursing
- Bachelor of social work

- Graduate programs:

- Master's in psychoeducation
- Master's in nursing
- Graduate diploma (diplôme d’études supérieures spécialisées, or DESS) in nursing

== Research ==
Led by its professors and researchers, the university's research programs extend to such fields as psychology, computer science and engineering, design and museology, social work and language studies. There is also an emerging natural sciences component, particularly in silviculture and deciduous forest management, through a close partnership with the Institut québécois d'aménagement de la forêt feuillue. The university is home to several different research bodies and specialized laboratories contributing to the expansion of knowledge.

== Research centres ==
UQO also has four research centres:

- Social innovation research centre (CRISES)
- Territorial development research centre (CRDT)
- Centre for studies and research on social intervention (CÉRIS)
- Language Technologies Research Centre (LTRC)

Language Technologies Research Centre (LTRC) In May 2006, UQO, in partnership with the federal government, inaugurated the Outaouais region's first international research facility: the Language Technologies Research Centre (LTRC). The 4,500 m^{2} Centre, built at a cost of $15.2 million, houses some 150 language industry specialists who pool their expertise in technology and linguistics on specific projects. The LRTC is a unique environment combining computer technology, information sciences, engineering and language and translation studies to develop integrated applications for multilingual information processing. The centre supports the Canadian language industry, and makes UQO the ideal destination for anyone interested in studying, specializing or conducting research in this field.

== Expansion projects ==
In January 2008, with a Québec government subsidy of $14 million, UQO began expanding wings A and C of its Alexandre-Taché pavilion, adding 7,600 m2 over five storeys. This expansion will allow UQO to consolidate all of its activities at the Alexandre-Taché campus, to create a unique university environment in downtown Gatineau. The addition includes new classrooms and high-tech laboratories for students in nursing, psychoeducation, psychology and labour relations. The library and cafeteria were also expanded to improve the quality of student services. Cyberpsychology laboratory. The cyberpsychology laboratory was launched by Stéphane Bouchard in 1996 with an in-house research grant from the Université du Québec à Hull (as UQO was formerly known). After a number of projects co directed by Stéphane Bouchard and Patrice Renaud, the laboratory was given official status in 1999, with subsidies from various in-house researcher training and research funds. By 2002, the laboratory had expanded to the point that it received subsidies from the Canada Foundation for Innovation (CFI) and the Canadian Institutes of Health Research (CIHR), which gave added impetus to the work in progress, including projects involving the use of videoconferencing in the treatment of panic disorder with agoraphobia, and the use of virtual reality in the treatment of anxiety disorders. The research team is headed by Stéphane Bouchard, Ph.D. and Patrice Renaud, Ph.D., who both hold undergraduate and post-doctoral degrees in psychology and teach in UQO's Psychology Department.

== UQO Foundation ==
This foundation was created in order to collect funds in order to improve the university's infrastructure and to meet the demand for the increasingly student population from year after year.

The funds are sometimes coming from students who are optionally paying a top-off cost during their semester inscription. Generally, the optional fee is $5 per student and a great number of them did donate that amount. On their website people can donate various amount by filling up a form. The UQO also collects funds from various events organized throughout the year.

In 2006, the UQO set up a goal of about 10 million dollars.

== Student associations ==
The main student association of the university is called the AGE-UQO (called l'Association Générale des Etudiant(es) de l'Université du Québec en Outaouais (General Student Association). There are also smaller associations which includes only members from a particular faculty such the AEMSS (social sciences), the AEEMP (psychology), the AEME (education), the AEML (arts and letters), the AEMP (educational psychology), the AESS (health sciences), the CEG (computer engineering), the REEEMI (image multidisciplinary school), the REETS (social work), the REI (computer science) and the REMAA (business administration).

== Radio station ==
Reel-Radio, a community university radio station like Carleton University's CKCU-FM only airs at the UQO, but the station is in the process of becoming a new radio station for the FM brand.

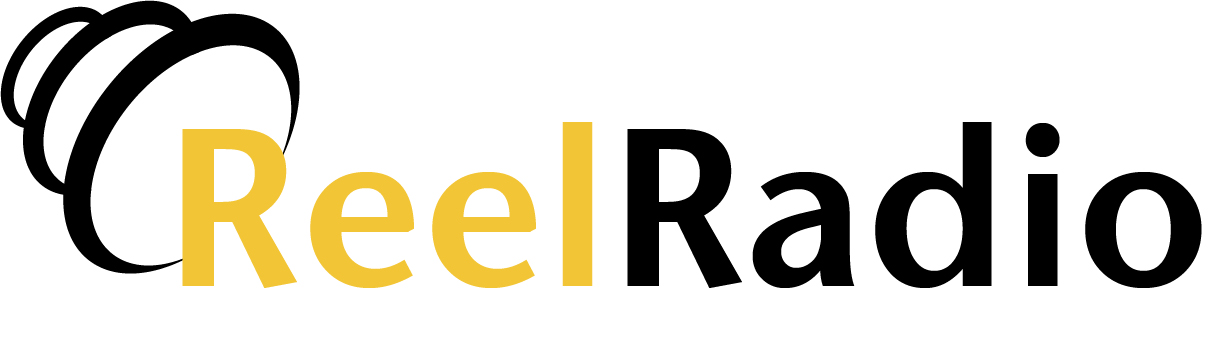
Current logo of the UQO radio station

The process is under examination by the Canadian Radio-television and Telecommunications Commission (CRTC) and Reel-Radio may start to air in the FM band starting in the fall of 2007.

== See also ==
- Higher education in Quebec
- List of universities in Quebec
- Canadian Interuniversity Sport
- Canadian government scientific research organizations
- Canadian university scientific research organizations
- Canadian industrial research and development organizations
