= Spring Creek Park =

Public park in New York City

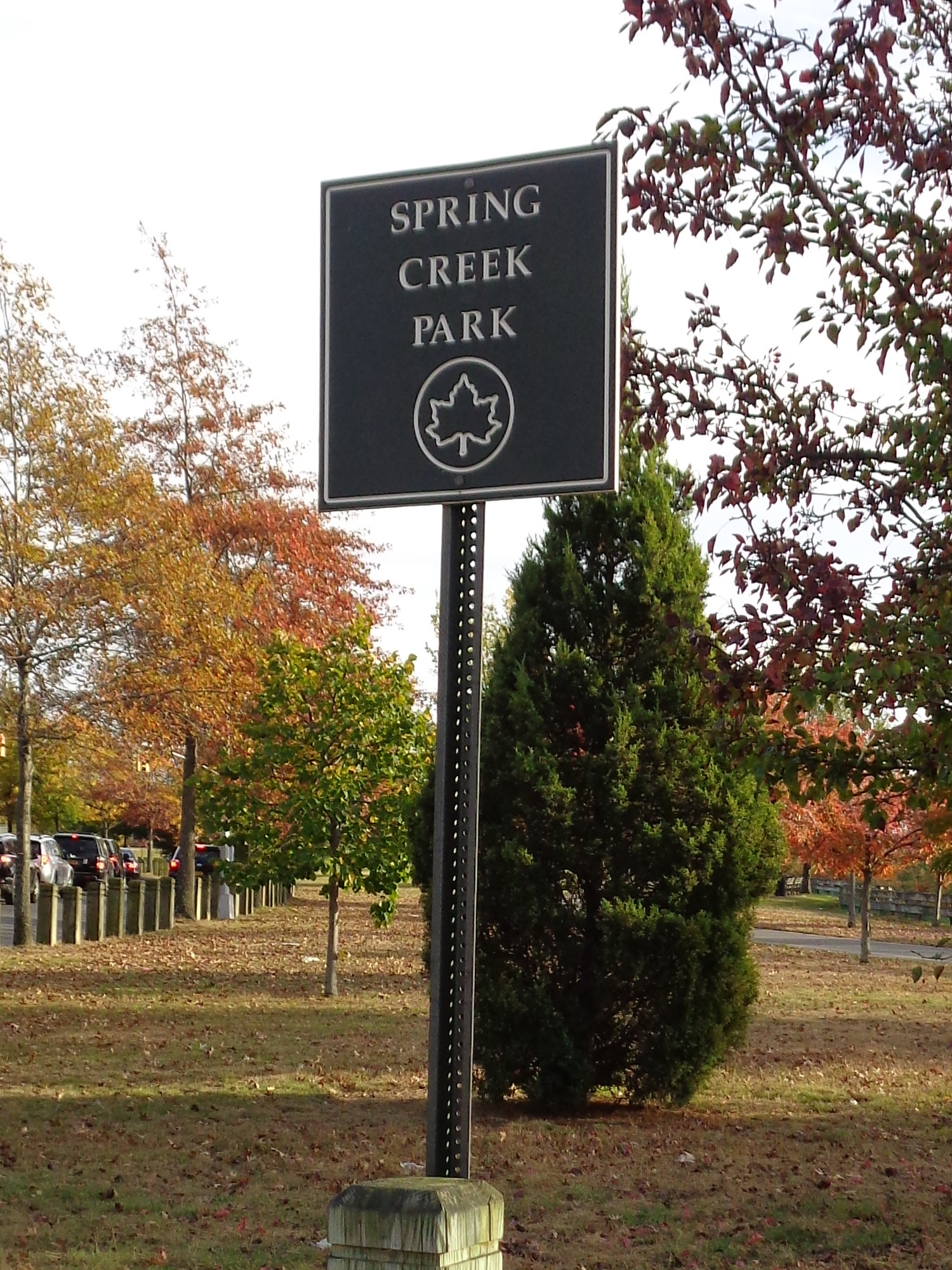
- Interactive map of Spring Creek Park
- Type: Public park
- Location: Spring Creek, Brooklyn and Howard Beach, Queens, New York
- Coordinates: 40.650890°N 73.848957°W
- Operator: New York City Department of Parks and Recreation, National Park Service

Spring Creek Park is a public park along the Jamaica Bay shoreline between the neighborhoods of Howard Beach, Queens, and Spring Creek, Brooklyn, in New York City. Created on landfilled former marshland, the park is mostly an undeveloped nature preserve, with only small portions accessible to the public for recreation.

Spring Creek Park consists of three major parts, which surround the park's eponymous creek and several smaller waterways. Spring Creek South comprises the section on the Queens side south of the Belt Parkway, which consists mostly of a marsh and forest on the shore of the Howard Beach peninsula, surrounding the neighborhood on its western and southern sides. Spring Creek North consists of a largely fenced-off section of land north of Belt Parkway; it straddles the Brooklyn–Queens border, which runs along Spring Creek. A third section of parkland was built around the Gateway Center shopping mall, which is located north of Belt Parkway on the Brooklyn side. The southern section is part of the Gateway National Recreation Area and under the jurisdiction of the National Park Service, while the northern and Gateway Center portions are managed by the New York City Department of Parks and Recreation.

A park along Spring Creek was first proposed in 1930 by the New York Park Association's Metropolitan Conference on Parks. It was ultimately decided that the park be built upon fill, since the site mostly consisted of marshland. Spring Creek Park was approved in 1942, and land-filling operations began in 1949. Temporary landfills for waste disposal were operated at the future park site until the South Shore Incinerator along Spring Creek was completed in 1954. The southern section of Spring Creek Park was integrated into the Gateway National Recreation Area in 1974. In the 1990s, the northern section of the park was expanded via land acquisition, and in 2003, The Related Companies built extra parkland as part of Gateway Center's construction. The New York state government opened the Shirley Chisholm State Park along the Brooklyn coastline, south of the Gateway Center section of the park, in 2019.

== Description ==
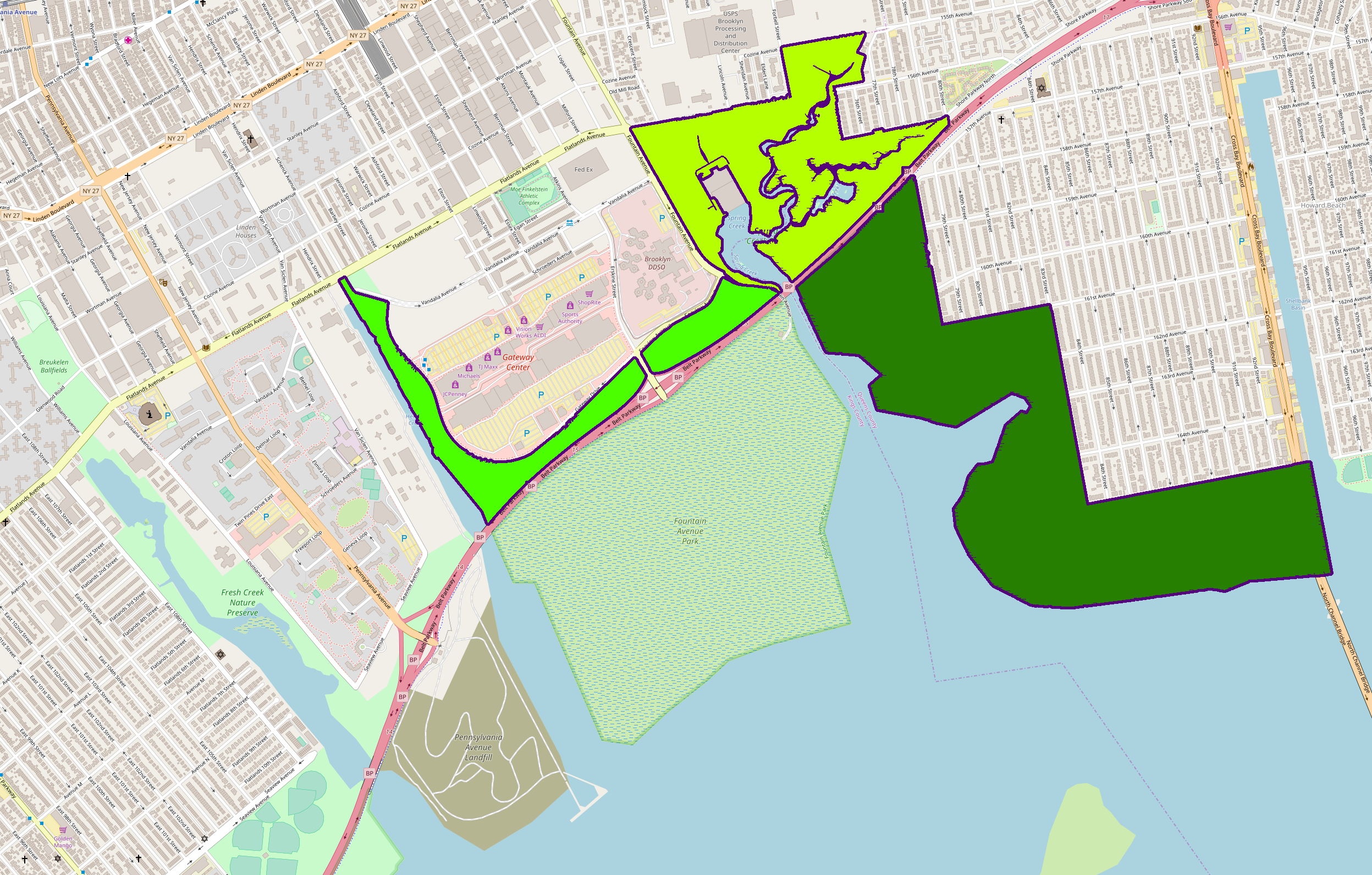
The three sections of Spring Creek Park: the area around the Gateway Center (bright green), Spring Creek North (yellow-green), and Spring Creek South within the Gateway National Area (dark green)

Spring Creek Park is on the northern coastline of Jamaica Bay, extending west from Cross Bay Boulevard in Howard Beach to the Fresh Creek Basin near Starrett City in the Spring Creek neighborhood. Most of the site lies adjacent or to the south of the Shore Parkway section of the Belt Parkway. A small portion of the park along the former Spring Creek Basin (concurrent with the Brooklyn-Queens border) extends north as far as Stanley Avenue.

=== Spring Creek South ===
The southernmost and easternmost section of the park is located entirely within Howard Beach, bound by the Belt Parkway to the north and Jamaica Bay to the south, with Cross Bay Boulevard to the east and the mouth of Spring Creek (or Old Mill Creek) to the west. The park is on a peninsula adjacent to the "New Howard Beach" or Rockwood Park community. This area is known as "Spring Creek South" or "Lower Spring Creek", and is managed by the federal National Park Service as part of the Gateway National Recreation Area. Much of this area was formerly a municipal garbage landfill. Existing vegetation in Spring Creek South includes upland forest, grassland and shrubland, along with both freshwater and tidal marshes. Two pathways run through this section of the park. The area has been referred to as "the Weeds" or "the Baja" by local residents due to its vegetation and remoteness. It is also susceptible to brush fires during prolonged dry weather. Because it is part of the national park system, the area is accessible to the public.

=== Spring Creek North ===
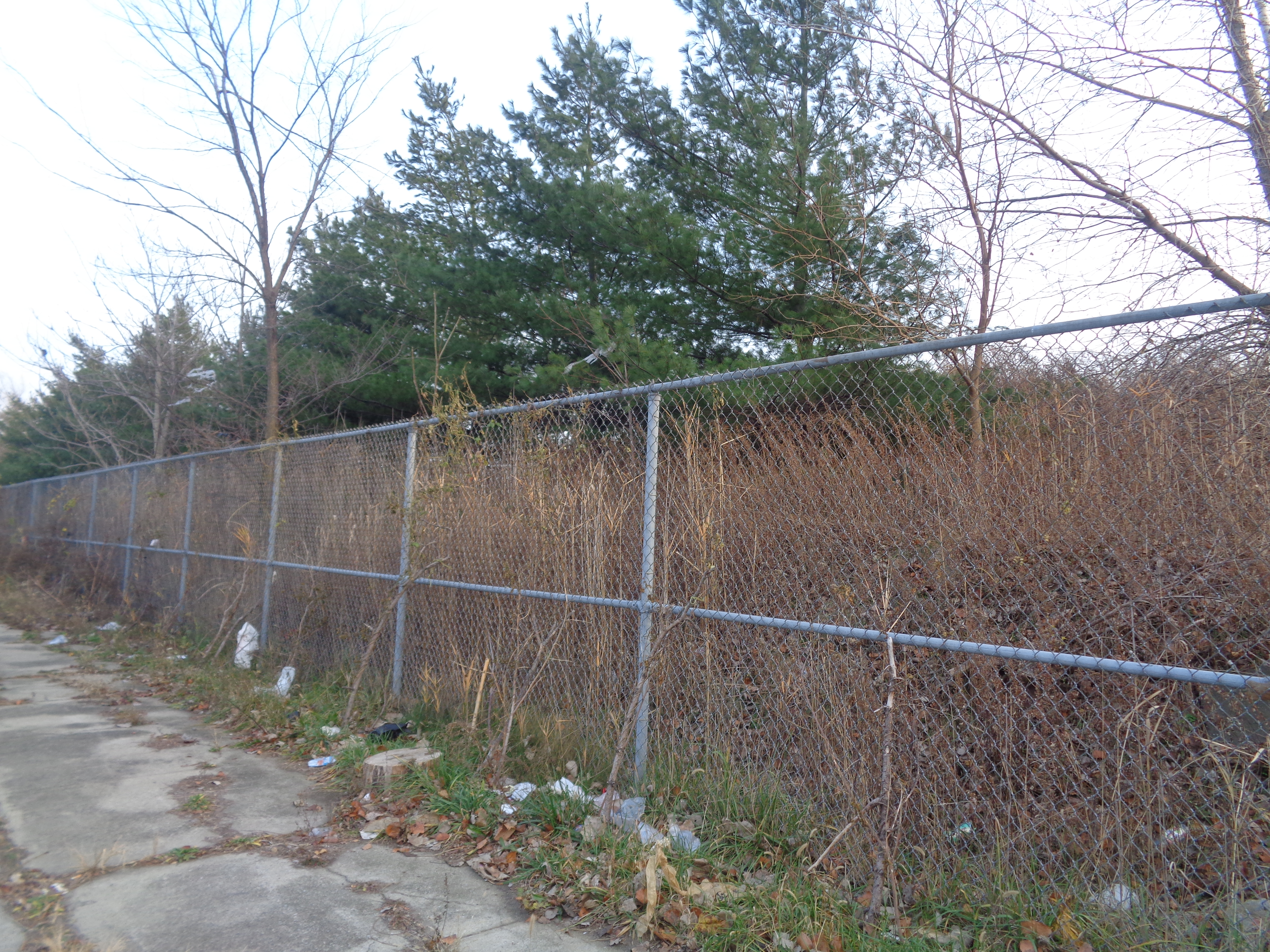
The fencing closing off the Spring Creek North Preserve, looking from Flatlands Avenue

The second section of the park is north of the Belt Parkway along the Brooklyn-Queens border, between Fountain Avenue to the west and 78th Street to the east, extending past Flatlands Avenue to Stanley Avenue at its north end. This portion contains the remnants of Spring Creek and a second small creek called Ralph's Creek, which feed into the mouth of Old Mill Creek. It is managed by the New York City Department of Parks and Recreation. This area is known as "Spring Creek North" or "Upper Spring Creek", or as the "Spring Creek Park Preserve". The portion of Spring Creek North within Queens which contains Ralph's Creek is called the "Spring Creek Park Addition", added to the site in the 1990s.

The area is designated by the Parks Department as a "Forever Wild" nature preserve site, and is inaccessible to the public. Because of this, the property is entirely lined with chain-link fencing. According to the Parks Department, this area is the "largest undeveloped salt marsh in northern Jamaica Bay", and serves as a habitat for numerous bird species as well as land animals. In spite of its status as "Forever Wild", Spring Creek North contains two major waste disposal facilities. A water treatment plant, the Spring Creek Auxiliary Water Pollution Control Plant, is in this section near the intersection of Fountain and Vandalia Avenues. Farther north along Forbell Street is the former South Shore Incinerator, now used as a cleaning garage and composting facility by the New York City Department of Sanitation. Like Spring Creek South, this area was also subjected to garbage landfilling. The site of the water treatment plant was initially the Crescent Street Landfill. This was later replaced by the South Shore Landfill, which extended north to Stanley Avenue and received ash from the incinerator. A narrow concrete berm bridge crosses the Spring Creek waterway along the right-of-way of 157th Avenue, separating the remnants of the creek. The bridge may have been used for landfilling operations, and contains within it a combined sewage overflow pipe leading to the water treatment plant. The presence of the two waste facilities has led to criticism by park advocates and local residents.

=== Gateway Center parkland ===
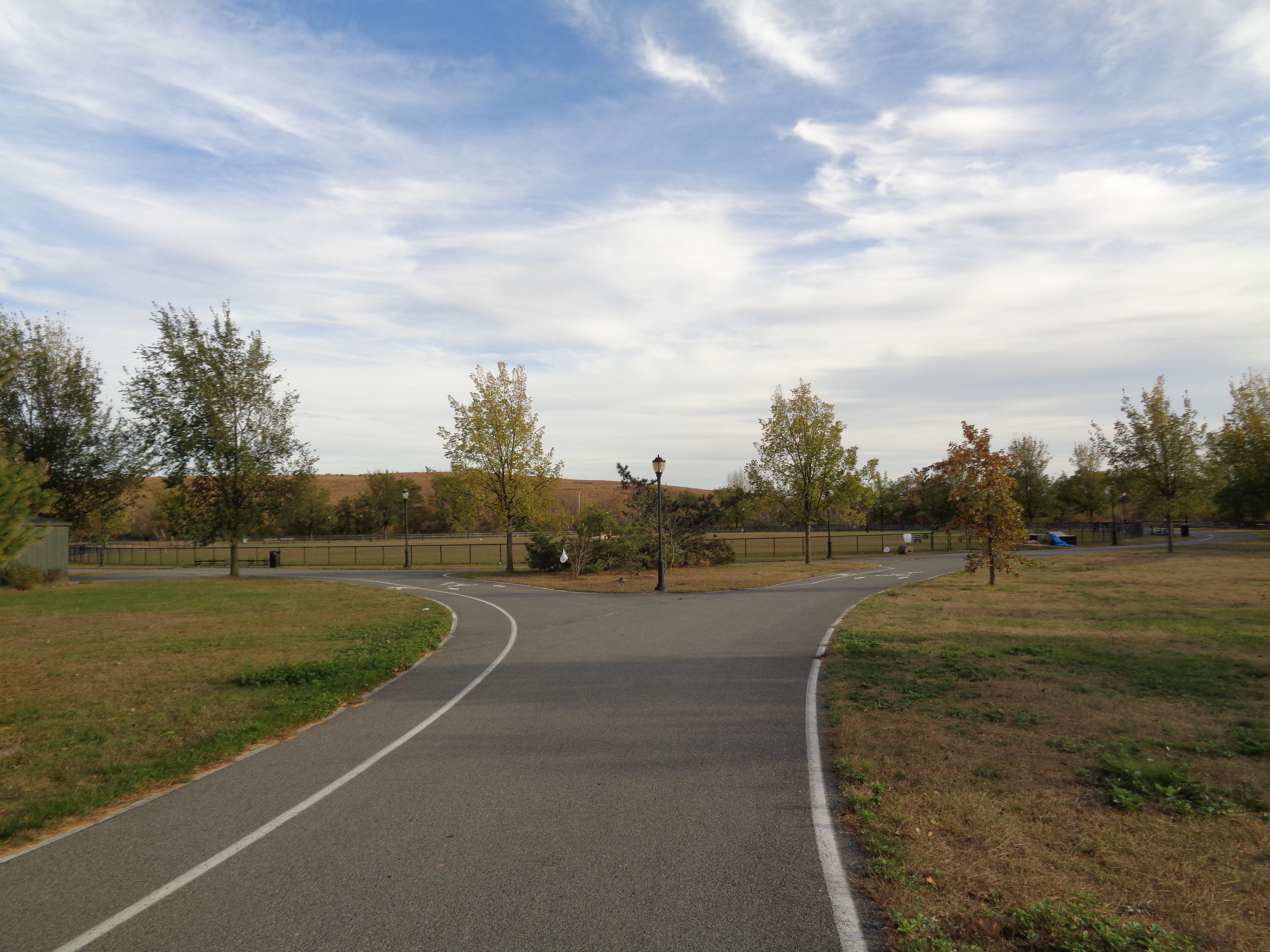
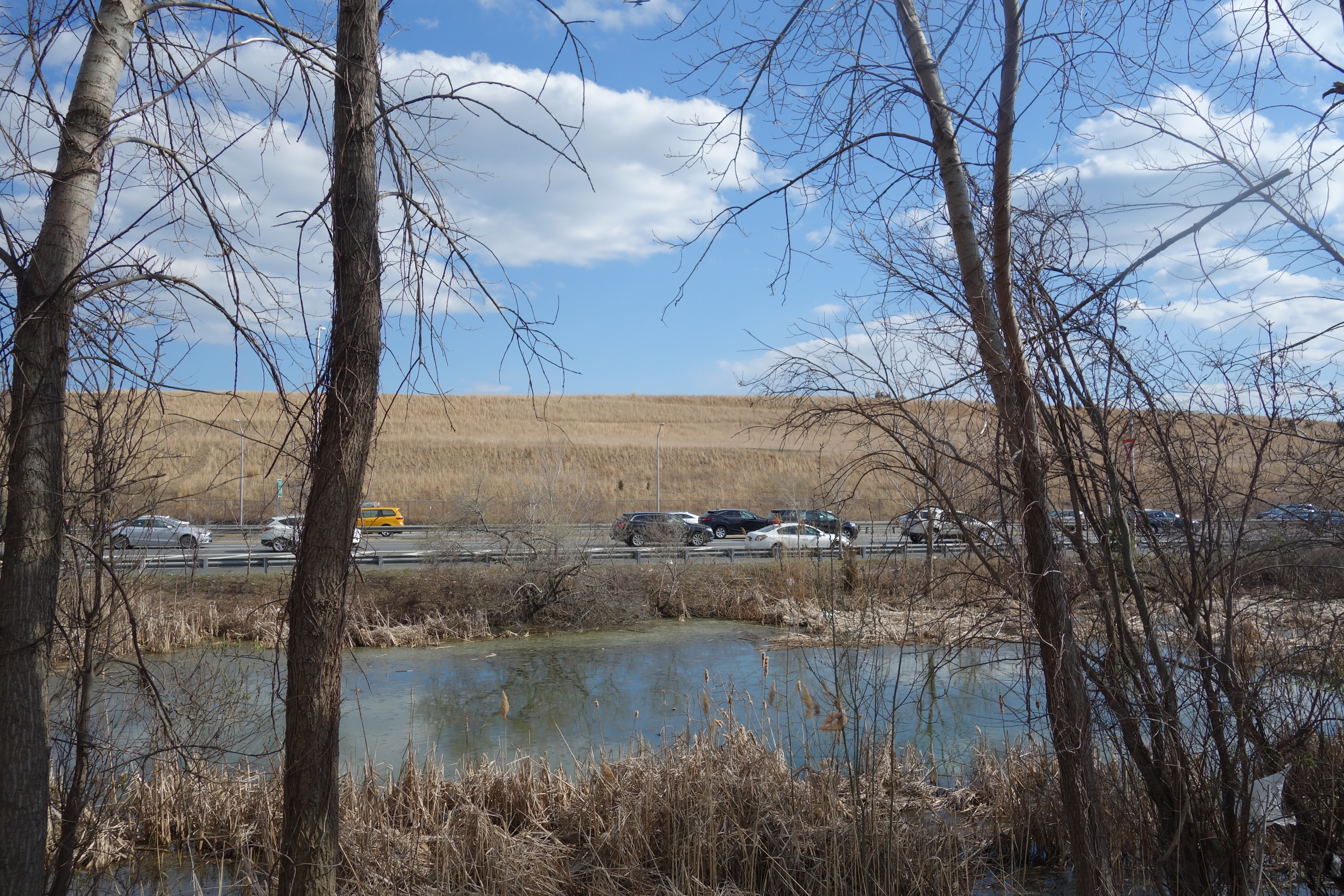
Left: the bike path and cricket field; Right: The wetlands along the Belt Parkway

The third and westernmost section of the park is north of the Belt Parkway along the southern and western edges of the Gateway Center shopping mall. This portion of the park is managed by the Parks Department, and was constructed in 2003 by The Related Companies who developed Gateway Center. It contains a total of 47.1 acres (19.1 ha) of parkland, though only 31.25 acres (12.65 ha) between Erskine Street to the east and Flatlands Avenue to the north is accessible.

This section features man-made or constructed wetlands which line the Belt Parkway. The parkland acts as a natural filter for stormwater runoff from the mall parking lot, after which the water flows into Hendrix Creek on the west side of the mall and park, or into the wetlands along the parkway. Numerous sewer pipes run through this portion of the park from the Gateway Center parking lot towards either Hendrix Creek or the Belt Parkway.

This section also contains a cricket pitch called the Roy Sweeney Cricket Oval, at the southwest corner of the Gateway site, with several small bleachers surrounding the field. It is the first New York City park field to be designated specifically for cricket. It was named in 2016 for Roy Sweeney, who founded the United States Cricket Promoters Association in 1986. A bikeway and running path runs through the park, including a roundabout circumscribing the cricket oval. A comfort station is at the cricket oval, completed in July 2013. It is prefabricated, consisting of concrete designed to mimic wood. It also uses storage tanks due to the park's distance from major sewer lines.

=== Former parkland ===
The 1954 plans for the park had two additional tracts included in the park, which are now the Pennsylvania Avenue and Fountain Avenue Landfills. The Fountain Avenue Landfill is across to the south of the Gateway section of Spring Creek Park, and across to the west from Spring Creek South. The Pennsylvania Avenue Landfill is farther west, south of Starrett City. These former landfills were designated in 2018 as Shirley Chisholm State Park, which opened to the public on July 2, 2019.

=== Transportation ===
The B13, B83, B84 and Q8 bus routes serve the portions of the park within Brooklyn. All four routes serve the Gateway Center, while the B13, B84, and Q8 all operate on Fountain Avenue near the Park Preserve. The Howard Beach portions of the park can be reached via the Q21 and Q41 local routes and the Q52 and Q53 Select Bus Service routes which operate on Cross Bay Boulevard in Howard Beach. The closest New York City Subway stations to the area are New Lots Avenue in East New York, Brooklyn served by the 2, 3, 4, and 5 trains (connected by the B84 bus), and the Howard Beach–JFK Airport station served by the A train and AirTrain JFK.

== History ==
During at least three glacial periods, including the Wisconsin glaciation around 20,000 years ago, ice sheets advanced south across North America carving moraines, valleys, and hills. A terminal moraine was formed across the center of Long Island creating a drainage divide, with streams such as Spring Creek flowing south from the moraine (in what is now Highland Park at modern Jamaica Avenue) towards Jamaica Bay. The creek would later form the border between Brooklyn and Queens. What is now Spring Creek, Brooklyn, was characterized by marshland and streams such as Spring Creek and Hendrix Creek into the 20th century. Similarly, the section of Howard Beach, Queens, west of Cross Bay Boulevard (now New Howard Beach) consisted of undeveloped wetlands, while the peninsula was triangular and much smaller than its current extents.

=== Initial construction and landfill ===
A 1950 census map of Spring Creek, identifying the Pennsylvania and Fountain Avenue Landfills as part of Spring Creek Park. The landfills have since been developed into Shirley Chisholm State Park.

In February 1930, the New York Park Association's Metropolitan Conference on Parks released a large report on potential parks and highways to be built in the city. The conference was chaired by the Long Island State Park commissioner at the time, Robert Moses, who would later become the New York City Parks commissioner. The report included a 100-acre (40 ha) Spring Creek Park as well the Shore Parkway portion of the Belt Parkway, both in Brooklyn. The Metropolitan Park Conference called the Spring Creek site '"the last opportunity in Brooklyn for a new park of substantial size which can be acquired at reasonable cost.'" By October of that year, it was determined that the swampy land would have to be filled in order to turn it into a proper park. At this time, the 150-acre (61 ha) tract was bound by Fountain Avenue to the west, Cozine Avenue (then Fairfield Avenue) to the north, and Sheridan Avenue to the east, on the western banks of Spring Creek where the water treatment plant now sits. Moses planned to create several parks on wetlands by filling the land with municipal waste before developing the land into parkland. These included the future Spring Creek Park and sites in Marine Park, Brooklyn; Ferry Point, Bronx; Fresh Kills, Staten Island; and Edgemere, Queens.

In August 1942, the New York City Planning Commission and Board of Estimate approved the Spring Creek Park project as part of the city's post-World War II program. By 1948, portions of the park in Brooklyn were landfilled. On August 20, 1948, the New York City Board of Estimate approved the creation of a "Super Dump" at Spring Creek Park, to the west of what was then Howard Beach (now Old Howard Beach). The new dump would replace smaller landfills in other areas of Queens and reduce the load on the Edgemere Landfill. The landfill would operate until the completion of the nearby South Shore Incinerator in Spring Creek. Afterwards, the landfill would become part of the park. Bids for preparation of the site were opened on September 17, 1948. This work involved grading the site and installing a dyke around the landfill to prevent the runoff of garbage into Jamaica Bay. Landfilling began in Howard Beach on January 17, 1949. The dump was located on a 125-acre (51 ha) site along Jamaica Bay stretching west from Cross Bay Boulevard to the Brooklyn-Queens border at Old Mill Creek. It extended north 0.5 miles (0.80 km) to 165th Avenue. Prior to filling, it was a tidal marsh, with the nearest homes said to be located as far as 0.5 miles (0.80 km) away. The fill would raise the grade of the future park by 16 feet (4.9 m). The "Super Dump" was anticipated to operate for three years, after which it would be replaced by incinerators. In addition to sand, chemicals would be applied to the garbage in order to eliminated odors. By August 1949 the filling of the marshland, which was described as having "its own odors, its unsightly heaps of rubbish and its rotted pilings", received positive feedback from local communities including the absence of foul odors. The newly-reclaimed land along the coast drew comparisons to Jones Beach in Nassau County, which had also been developed by Robert Moses.

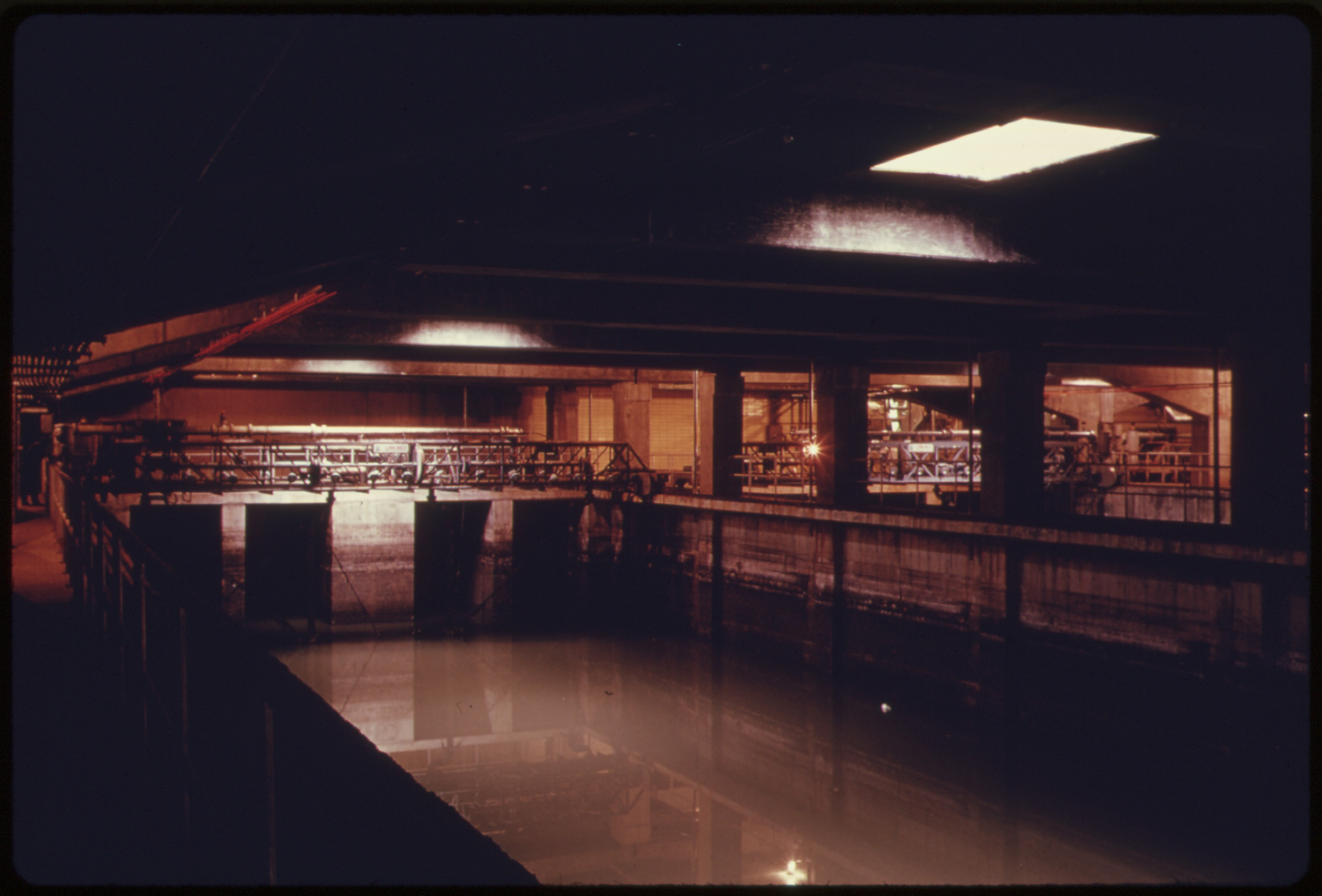
Inside the Spring Creek water treatment plant in 1974

At both Spring Creek and Marine Park, sewage sludge from wastewater plants was mixed with sand to create "synthetic topsoil" in order to provide a base for future vegetation. The projects were referred to as "Operation Sludge". The South Shore Incinerator was opened on June 30, 1954. At this time, Robert Moses' plans called for Spring Creek Park to extend east to Cross Bay Boulevard in Howard Beach and include a new beach and boat basin. The Queens Spring Creek landfill, the first portion of the park, was completed between 1956 and 1958, after which additional land reclamation projects began. A 75-acre (30 ha) area was reclaimed in the Queens section of the park. Filling at the Pennsylvania Avenue Landfill began in 1956, while the Fountain Avenue Landfill began operations in 1961 or 1963. The landfill and incinerator operations significantly changed the topography and vegetation of the area. The western Howard Beach peninsula was significantly filled and extended west towards Old Mill Creek, allowing residential development to occur.

=== Expansion ===
In 1969, the Regional Plan Association proposed the creation of what would become the Gateway National Recreation Area. A federal study from December of that year would also recommend the establishment of such a national park. The area would include numerous sites in the New York Harbor, Atlantic Ocean coast, and along Jamaica Bay. By 1971, there were calls to include Spring Creek Park in the proposed area, including those from Ozone Park Congressman Joseph P. Addabbo. Addabbo wished for Spring Creek to be included in part to prevent the further expansion of John F. Kennedy International Airport into the area. Alternate plans by the New York City Planning Commission suggested that the parkland be "developed into a residential, industrial and recreational complex". At this time, much of the park had yet to be developed. The bill establishing the Gateway National Recreational Area was signed into law by President Richard Nixon on October 28, 1972. On November 12, 1973, the City Planning Commission approved the cession of 14,000 acres (5,700 ha) of city-owned land to the Gateway Area, but excluding Spring Creek Park. On November 15, the Board of Estimate unanimously voted against extending the landfill in the Howard Beach portion of the park. The Gateway plans were later amended by the City Planning Commission to include part of Spring Creek Park. The Howard Beach section of Spring Creek Park was ceded to the Gateway Area on March 1, 1974.

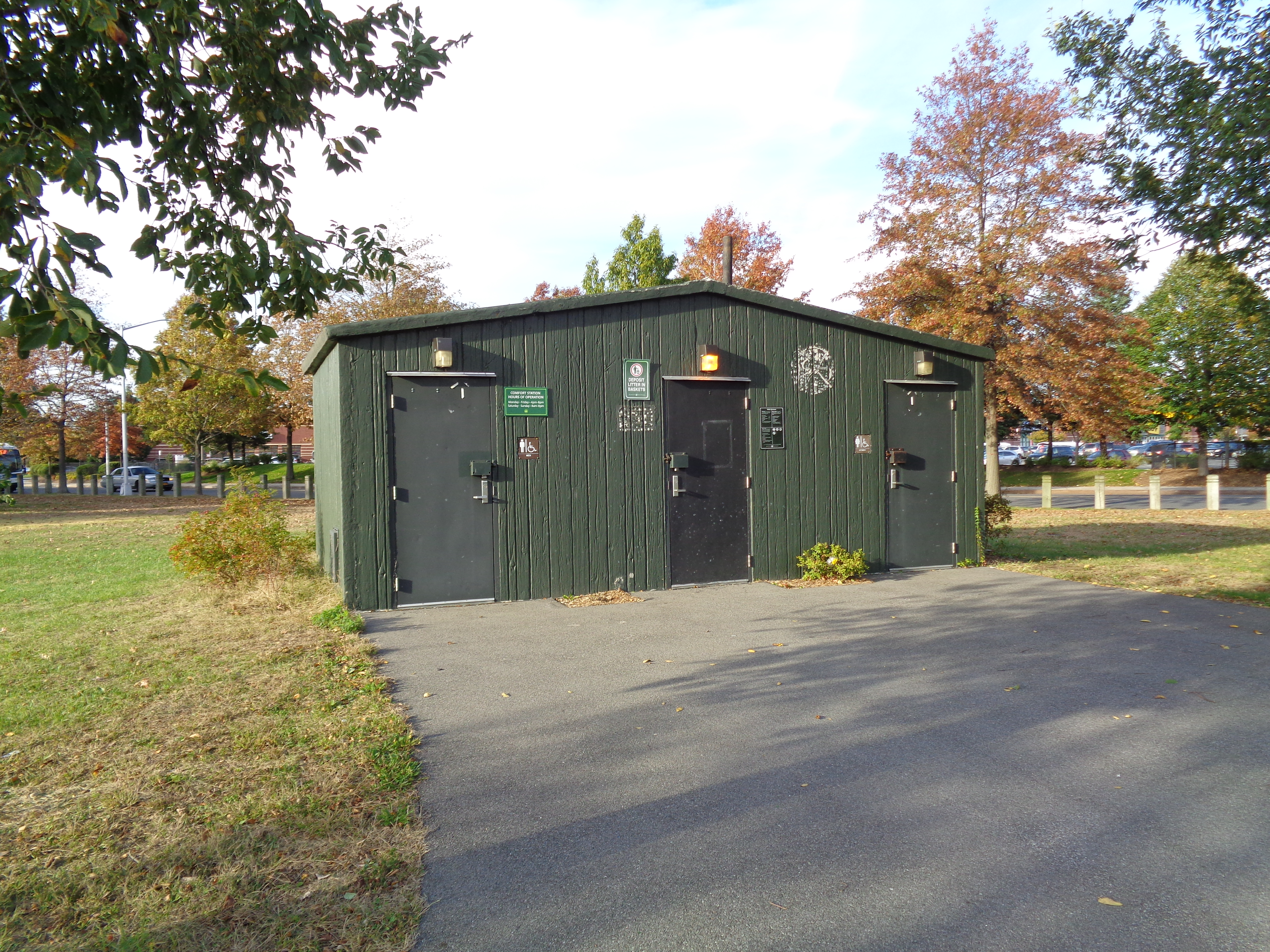
The cricket field comfort station, completed in July 2013

The Spring Creek water treatment plant was opened in 1974 in Spring Creek Park North. In 1979, the National Park Service released plans to develop their portion of the park, which would have included beaches and sports facilities. In summer 1992 the New York City Department of City Planning released the New York City Comprehensive Waterfront Plan, which sought to improve and expand the waterfront parkland within the city including the area around Jamaica Bay. The plan proposed to add the tidal wetlands surrounding Spring Creek and Old Mill Creek south of Flatlands Avenue to Spring Creek Park. Private property would be acquired to add to the park, and mapped but unbuilt streets running through the park boundaries would be demapped. In 1992 and again between 1994 and 1995, parkland north of the Belt Parkway within Queens was added to Spring Creek Park North as part of the Spring Creek Park Addition. Three blocks of additional land north of Flatlands Avenue, including the former South Shore Incinerator, were added to this section of park on August 21, 2001. The Spring Creek Yard Waste Composting Facility was opened at the former incinerator site in September 2001. Following the opening of Gateway Center mall in 2002, The Related Companies constructed an addition to Spring Creek Park circumscribing the mall, opening on May 2, 2003. In March 2007, designs began on a comfort station for the park cricket field. Construction began in March 2012, and the facility was completed in July 2013.

Following Hurricane Sandy in late 2012, the state and federal governments began designing restoration projects for both Spring Creek South and Spring Creek North, in order for the wetlands to act as a natural storm surge barrier for Howard Beach and other neighborhoods along Jamaica Bay.

In January 2018, Governor Andrew Cuomo announced his intent to build the Shirley Chisholm State Park, a 407-acre (165 ha) state park along 3.5 miles (5.6 km) of the Jamaica Bay coastline, adjoining the Pennsylvania Avenue and Fountain Avenue landfills south of Spring Creek Park's Gateway Mall section. It would be located near Spring Creek and be open in 2019. The first section opened on July 2, 2019, and the second section is expected to open in 2021.

Around February 2018, traces of radium were discovered in the Howard Beach section of Spring Creek Park by the National Park Service and New York State Department of Environmental Conservation during initial work on the restoration project. The radium was believed to be introduced when the area was used as a landfill.

== Incidents ==
On February 25, 2006, the body of 24-year-old Imette St. Guillen was discovered on Fountain Avenue in a marshy area of Spring Creek Park. A memorial was set up within the park to commemorate St. Guillen.

On August 2, 2016, Karina Vetrano, a 30-year-old resident of Howard Beach, was attacked and murdered by 20-year old Chanel Lewis while jogging in Spring Creek Park South. By the end of the month, eight NYPD security cameras were installed along the perimeter of the park.
