= Fountain Avenue =

Avenue in Brooklyn, New York

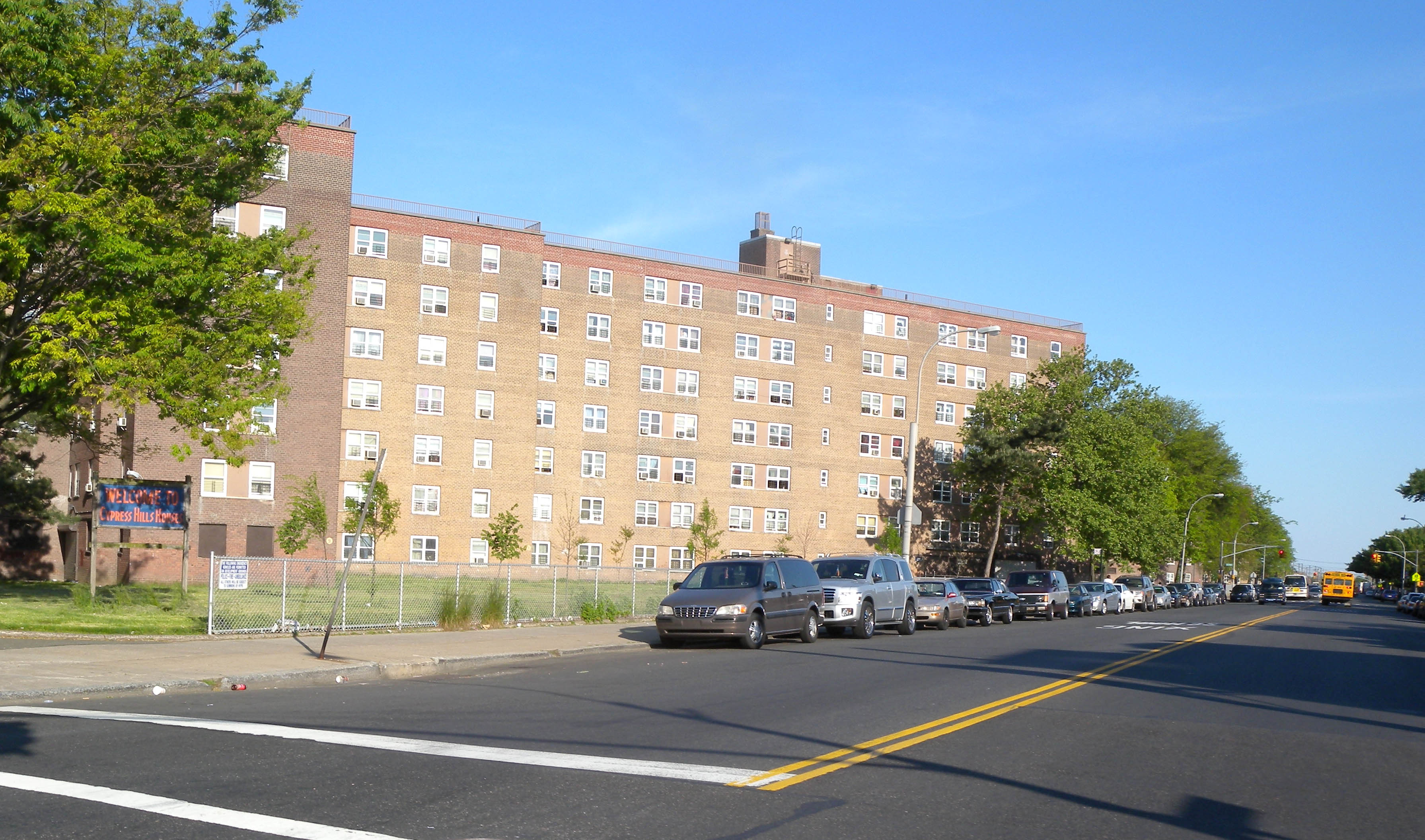
Public housing along Fountain Avenue

Fountain Avenue is a north–south running street in Brooklyn, New York. Traffic on the avenue is bidirectional for most of its length.

Its north end is at the intersection of Atlantic Avenue and Conduit Avenue. The south end, previously a swampland-like landfill near the Erskine Street exit off the Belt Parkway, has been developed as part of the neighborhood of Spring Creek and Shirley Chisholm State Park, built on the former Fountain Avenue and Pennsylvania Avenue landfills. For many years, this segment of Fountain Avenue, between Flatlands Avenue and the Belt Parkway, was undeveloped and used primarily as a site for illegal drag racing.

== Description ==
At its north end, Fountain Avenue is just a side street, carrying one lane of southbound traffic only. Between Sutter Avenue and Linden Boulevard, Fountain Avenue is a six-lane, undivided roadway. South of Linden Boulevard, the avenue gains a median. The median continues past Flatlands Avenue, ending at Seaview Avenue. Between Flatlands Avenue and Seaview Avenue, Fountain Avenue borders the newly developed Spring Creek Neighborhood and the Brooklyn DDSO office to the West, and the Spring Creek AWPCP to the east.

Fountain Avenue continues through past Seaview Avenue, where it curves under the Belt Parkway. Prior to 2021, the publicly accessible portion of Fountain Avenue ran to a dead end just south of the Belt Parkway, at the site of the former Fountain Avenue Landfill. The Fountain Avenue Landfill has since been developed for public use as part of Shirley Chisholm State Park. The Fountain Avenue section of the park opened in 2021. Currently, Fountain Avenue now ends as part of a circular parking lot and maintenance facility for the State Park.

=== Southern end ===
Various tests of the Fountain Avenue area and landfills were conducted in 1985 and 1986.

A December 4, 1998 press announcement by Congressman Vito Fossella stated that Fossella "laid out a compelling argument for deauthorizing the property as part of Gateway National Recreation Area and restoring it as a temporary waste disposal site only for trash generated in Brooklyn".

Bill Farrell, writing for the New York Daily News, summarized the condition of the area during a 2003 article: "The malodorous, toxic and visual nightmare reviled by drivers along the Belt Parkway will soon be transformed into 400 acres (1.6 km^{2}) of parkland along Jamaica Bay."

On February 12, 2004, New York City Sanitation filed a request to operate a yard waste composting facility. The application was completed in March 2006.

BergerWorld reported in its 2nd Quarter 2006 report: "Berger, teamed with URS, is assisting the New York City Department of Environmental Protection in the $160 million, 297-acre (1.20 km^{2}) Pennsylvania & Fountain Avenue Landfills (PAFAL) closure project in Brooklyn, NY, one of the largest closures ever undertaken in the state of New York"

The landfill was mentioned on July 10, 2007, as undergoing a $20 million ecological restoration with the Pennsylvania landfill. The area is also under discussion by local government to be considered for more development. City Line Park was mentioned as being redesigned and transformed under a $1.5 million renovation launched this day.

Ecological concerns were later expressed for the area on a "New York Habitat Restoration" webpage.

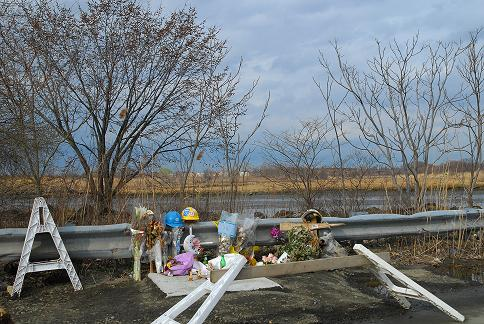
Memorial at Fountain Avenue near Belt Parkway

Fountain Avenue has been infamous as a dumping ground for bodies of people slain by the mob. In the 1930s a group known as Murder, Inc. used the area as a dumping ground for bodies. Later the DeMeo crew disposed of many victims there. In 2006, the body of Imette St. Guillen, who was murdered on February 25, was discovered.

== Transportation ==
Fountain Avenue is served by the following:

- The Q8 runs from Linden Boulevard to Seaview Avenue (Gateway Mall), and from Vandalia Avenue to Sutter Avenue (Jamaica), with additional service by the B84 south of Flatlands Avenue.
- The B13 runs from Cozine Avenue to Seaview Avenue (Gateway Mall), and from Vandalia Avenue to Flatlands Avenue (Wyckoff Hospital).
- The B15 runs between Linden Boulevard and Dumont Avenue.

== See also ==
- Landfills in the United States
