= Danielle Mastrion =

American painter

Danielle Mastrion (born 1982) is a New York City-based mural artist. She is also a painter and aerosol artist. She was raised in Sheepshead Bay, Brooklyn, and studied fine arts at the Parsons School of Design, where she received her BFA in illustration. Among her street murals are “The Notorious B.I.G.” in Bushwick, Brooklyn; DJ Kool Herk; Beastie Boys singer MCA; “Little Girls” in Flatbush, Brooklyn; and a portrait of New York Congresswoman Shirley Chisholm for the 2019 opening of the Shirley Chisholm State Park.

Her first solo art exhibition was held in March 2013 at MY NY in Brooklyn. In 2012 she was Art Battles’ NYC Champion. She is a teaching artist with Creative Art Works in New York City, and is trained in oil painting and has a background in live painting. Her work appeared in the A&E channel's “In Focus” series; “Made Mondays” for New Balance; Budweiser's ad campaign “Respect the Hustle;” and Spike Lee’s Netflix series “She's Gotta Have It.” Her art was also featured in the documentaries “No Free Walls,” and “Street Heroines."

Her art has been exported to cities outside of New York as well, including Los Angeles, Miami, Newark, Washington DC, and Arecibo, Puerto Rico. In addition she has competed art projects outside the United States, including in Cuba, Mexico, Belize, Berlin, Israel, England and Paris, France.

At the end of 2018 Mastrion participated in a dual art exhibit with fellow street artist and muralist Lexi Bella, at the 3rd ETHOS Gallery in Brooklyn, called The Grit & The Glam. She has also painted subjects representing world events and cultural icons, such as a mural dedicated to and in solidarity with the kidnapping of 270 Nigerian school girls kidnapped by Boko Haram; political leaders such as Nelson Mandela, and for French painter and sculptor Marcel Duchamp. She has also painted human rights activists, including Malala Yousafzai.
