= Murder of Karina Vetrano =

2016 murder in Queens, New York

Karina Vetrano
- Born: Karina Anne Vetrano; July 12, 1986
- Died: August 2, 2016 (aged 30); Queens, New York, U.S.
- Cause of death: Strangulation
- Height: 151 cm (4 ft 11 in)
- Parent(s): Phillip Vetrano (father); Cathie Vetrano (mother)

Chanel Lewis
- Conviction: 1 count of first-degree murder 2 counts of second-degree murder 1 count of sexual abuse (convicted April 1, 2019)
- Penalty: Life imprisonment without the possibility of parole

Details
- Victims: Karina Vetrano
- Date: August 2, 2016
- Date apprehended: February 4, 2017

Karina Anne Vetrano (July 12, 1986 – August 2, 2016) was a 30-year-old American woman who was attacked, sexually assaulted, and murdered while running in Spring Creek Park in the Howard Beach neighborhood of Queens, New York City. The case attracted national media attention, partially due to how it went unsolved for nearly six months. A suspect, Chanel Lewis, was arrested and charged with her murder in February 2017 after being linked by DNA evidence. Lewis' trial began on November 5, 2018, and ended in a mistrial on November 21, 2018. A retrial took place in March 2019.

On April 1, 2019, Lewis was found guilty on three counts of murder and one count of sexual abuse; he was sentenced to life in prison without parole. Following the trial, reports surfaced of the NYPD aggressively collecting DNA sampled of African-American men to the point of harassment, storing in a private DNA lab in a process unrelated to the murder case. Lewis's defense appealed the conviction on the grounds this search tactic was intentionally hidden by Brad Leventhal, and may have been racially motivated, but the conviction was upheld.

== Background ==
Karina Anne Vetrano was born in New York on July 12, 1986, to Phillip and Cathie Vetrano. She had two siblings: a brother and a sister. Her father, a New York City Fire Department retiree, was one of the emergency workers at the Twin Towers after the September 11 attacks. She attended Archbishop Molloy High School in Queens and graduated from St. John's University with a master's degree in speech pathology. An aspiring writer, she appeared in a 2013 short film inspired by her writings and directed by her screenwriter friend Petros Georgiadis. She lived in the same Queens neighborhood as her parents and worked with children with autism in Manhattan as a speech pathologist.

== Murder ==
In the late afternoon of August 2, 2016, Vetrano went for a run in Spring Creek Park, less than a block away from her home. She ran alone, despite the expressed concerns of her father, who was her usual running partner but was suffering from a back injury. She was last seen alive after 5 p.m., just before she entered the park.

After she failed to return repeated calls and texts, Vetrano's father notified a neighbor, a New York City Police Department (NYPD) police chief, who launched a search. Around 11 p.m. her father found her body face-down about 15 feet off the trail. Vetrano was found with her sports bra pulled down, revealing her breasts. Her underwear and shorts were rolled around her left thigh. They were pulled off her right leg, which was covered with scratches and bruises. An autopsy the next day confirmed that Vetrano had died from strangulation, and her death was ruled a homicide. Detectives said it appeared that she had been struck in the back of the head with a rock. She then put up a "ferocious fight" against her attacker, biting him so hard her teeth cracked. Her hands were found clutching grass from when she was dragged off the trail. She had been strangled so tightly a handprint was found on her neck. The DNA of her attacker was also found under her fingernails, on her back, and on her phone, which was found thrown in the weeds several feet away.

Police officials announced a $10,000 reward for information leading to the arrest of her killer. Despite the recovery of DNA at the crime scene, it initially failed to produce any leads, even after being run through local and national databases. Over 600 DNA samples were examined over the course of the investigation, with none coming up a positive match. Additionally, the NYPD checked over 1,700 investigative reports and followed over 250 leads. Chanel Lewis was arrested six months later, after authorities matched his DNA to that which had been found on the victim.

== Investigation and media coverage ==
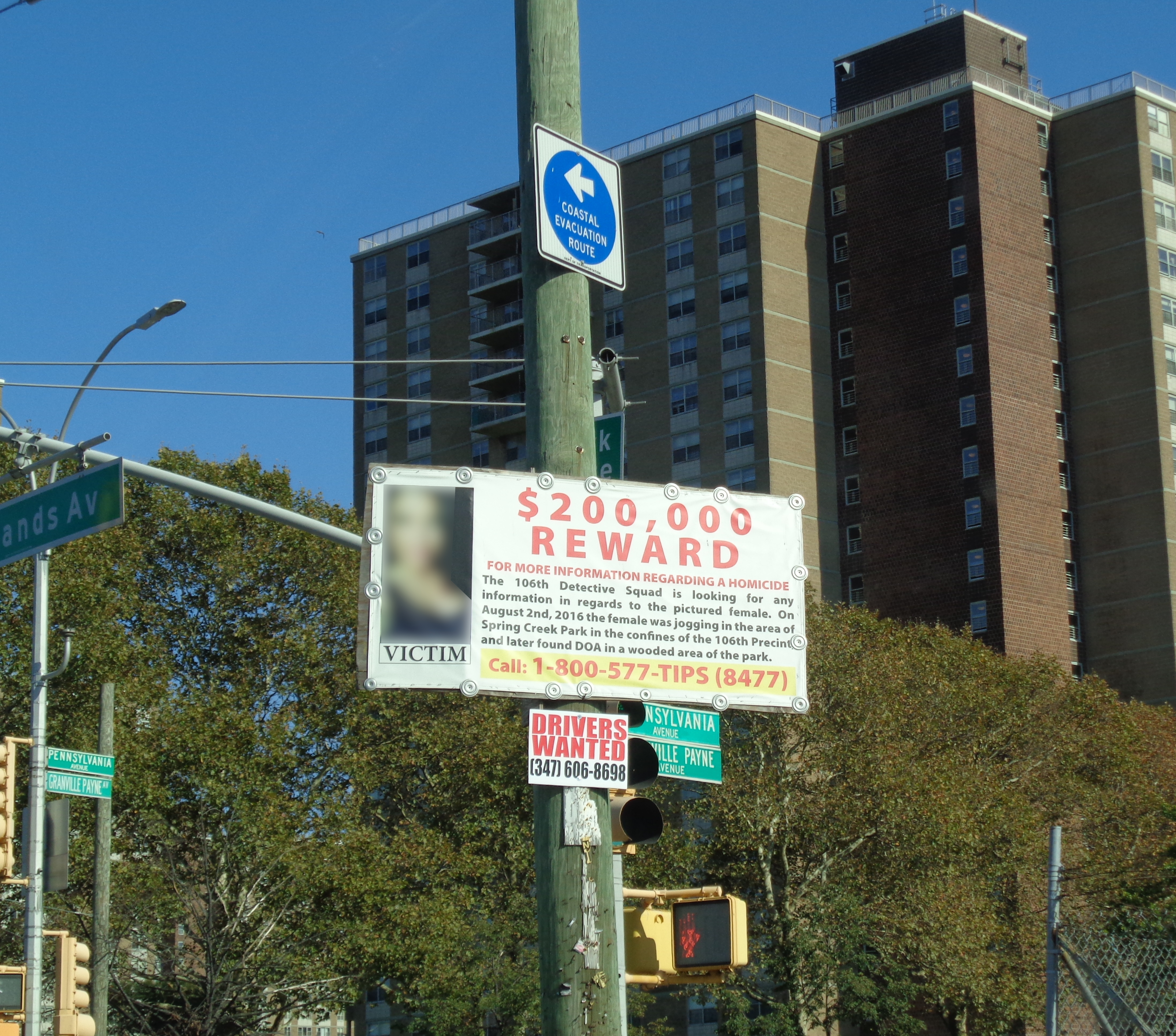
A reward poster for information on the case on Pennsylvania Avenue in nearby Starrett City, Brooklyn

On August 7, less than a week after Vetrano's murder, another New York City resident, 27-year-old Vanessa Marcotte, was found slain on a rural stretch of road in Princeton, Massachusetts. Marcotte was also killed during a run, and much of the news reporting on the crime compared it to Vetrano's murder; however, DNA and other evidence proved the murders were committed by different men. Vetrano and Marcotte's deaths have led to themes and discussions about the safety of women who exercise alone.

On August 31, police released a sketch of a "person of interest", a man who had been seen in near Spring Creek around the time Vetrano was killed. A utility worker had seen the man coming out of the weeds and running on a path by Belt Parkway. On September 12, the TV show Crime Watch Daily released a home surveillance video of Vetrano running near Spring Creek Park, minutes before she was killed. It is the last known footage of her alive.

In December 2016, the FBI and the NYPD developed and shared a suspect profile of who may have killed Vetrano. A GoFundMe page created by Vetrano's family, originally meant as a $250,000 reward fund for anyone with information about the killer, reached over $290,000. The extra money was donated to charity. Following the murder, the family had become outspoken proponents for familial DNA testing, pushing lawmakers to pass laws to authorize use of the practice.

== Suspect ==
On February 4, 2017, the police announced that a suspect for the murder had been taken into questioning. Police later added that Lewis, a 20-year-old Brooklyn resident, had been arrested and charged with one count of second-degree murder. Lewis was unemployed and lived with his mother, three sisters and their children in a low-income housing project in East New York, fewer than 3 miles (4.8 km) away from the park where Vetrano was found dead. Lewis also gave statements to police, including describing a peculiar puddle of muddy water that detectives had seen near Vetrano's body.

Lewis had several run-ins with police in the years before the murder, including three summonses in 2013: two for violating rules in Spring Creek Park and one for urinating in public. An additional incident occurred in May 2016 when a 9-1-1 caller reported a suspicious male with a crowbar in the backyards of several homes. An NYPD lieutenant who lived in Howard Beach also remembered him lurking around in the area looking into cars and traced him from when Lewis' name and address had been taken by police during a stop-and-frisk report. According to investigators, on August 2, Lewis had left his home after arguing with his family and walked over to the park, where he came across and then attacked Vetrano. While it is believed to have been a completely random encounter, it is not definitively known if Lewis had ever seen Vetrano before or premeditated the attack.

His mother recalled that upon returning home that night, he was looking "disheveled" with his clothes torn. Lewis claimed he had been mugged by a group of men, although there was no evidence of such an attack, and a police report was never filed. The next day, August 3, Lewis' father, a former school principal, took him to a local emergency room for treatment of scratches and cuts on Lewis' upper body. Hospital records confirmed that Lewis was treated by doctors the day after the murder, and that he had also suffered a hand injury. Lewis' family continued to deny his involvement in the homicide. His father claimed he had not heard of or read about Vetrano's death until after his son was arrested for it.

== Murder trials ==
The first murder trial began on November 5, 2018. Lewis entered a plea of not guilty to murder and sexual abuse charges, and faced a sentence of 25 years to life in prison. On November 7, Phil Vetrano testified in court on how he created a search party to find his daughter's body. Two days later, jurors watched a video tape of Lewis' confession to the murder. The tape had been previously played at a 2017 pretrial hearing in Queens Supreme Court. On November 14, forensic biologist Linda Razzano testified that Lewis' DNA had a one in 6 trillion chance of someone else sharing a genetic profile. Dr. Margaret Prial, who performed Vetrano's autopsy, described her injuries, including a compressed carotid artery in her neck. The next day, Assistant District Attorney Brad Leventhal asked Judge Michael Aloise to dismiss nine of the counts against Lewis. Four counts remained in the indictment: one of first-degree murder, two of second-degree murder, and one of first-degree sexual abuse. The first trial ended with a hung jury due to defensive arguments as well as claims that the DNA evidence was contaminated.

On November 21, 2018, a judge declared a mistrial and tentatively scheduled a retrial for January 22, 2019; the retrial was later rescheduled for March 2019. In the retrial, Lewis was found guilty on two counts of second-degree murder, one count of first-degree murder, and one count of sexual abuse on April 1, 2019, after five hours of deliberation. The sentencing hearing was initially scheduled for April 17, with expectations of a sentence to the maximum penalty of life in prison without the possibility of parole. A few days before the scheduled sentencing, Lewis' attorneys requested and received a delay so they could introduce allegations of misconduct among several members of the jury which convicted him. On April 23, 2019, Lewis was sentenced to life in prison without the possibility of parole.

== Aftermath ==
With the final ruling, Lewis maintained that he was innocent. Opponents to the ruling speculated it was racially motivated and accused the prosecution of manipulating DNA evidence. Some outlets also stated the judge refused to proceed with the case until the juror retracted his conclusion that the defendant was innocent. In 2022, a whistleblower report revealed that the NYPD used Parabon NanoLabs, a private DNA lab, to store DNA of hundreds of African-American men. These samples were said to have been collected to point of harassment and use of the lab was unrelated to the Vetrano murder case. Parabon was not permitted to operate in New York until 2020, after Lewis's conviction and the alleged collection of his DNA for storage by Parabon. Lewis' defense appealed the conviction, alleging this search tactic was maliciously not disclosed in court, accusing the prosecution and Brad Leventhal of a racially motivated conviction. The conviction was upheld in a February 2026 decision.
