= Murder of Vanessa Marcotte =

2016 killing in Princeton, Massachusetts, U.S.

Vanessa Marcotte
- Born: Vanessa Teresa Marcotte; June 17, 1989; Leominster, Massachusetts, U.S.
- Died: August 7, 2016 (aged 27); Princeton, Massachusetts, U.S.
- Cause of death: Murder
- Parent(s): John Marcotte (father); Rosanna Marcotte (mother)

Vanessa Teresa Marcotte (June 17, 1989 – August 7, 2016) was a 27-year-old American woman who, while walking on a rural road in Princeton, Massachusetts, was assaulted and murdered. Her case went unsolved until April 15, 2017, when authorities announced that 31-year-old Angelo Colon-Ortiz of Worcester, Massachusetts, had been arrested for her murder after being linked by DNA evidence.

== Background ==
Vanessa Teresa Marcotte was born in Leominster, Massachusetts, on June 17, 1989, to John and Rosanna Marcotte. An only child, she attended the Bancroft School in Worcester, Massachusetts, and graduated with honors with a bachelor's degree in communications from Boston University in 2011. She then proceeded into her professional career where she worked at an online marketing software startup in Boston called WordStream, as well as at the American offices of Vistaprint. She eventually started working as an account manager at Google in New York City, where she worked up until her death. While Marcotte lived full-time in New York City, she often made bi-monthly visits to her mother and aunt, who lived in Princeton, Massachusetts, a small rural town of less than 4,000 residents in Worcester County.

== Murder ==
On Sunday, August 7, 2016, Marcotte left her mother's house on Brooks Station Road in Princeton in the early afternoon to go for a walk before heading back to New York by commuter bus later in the day. Her family notified police when several hours passed and she did not return. Police then immediately launched a missing persons search. She was found deceased off the street on a trail in a heavily wooded area around 8:20 PM, less than a half-mile from her mother's home.

Officials immediately classified it as a homicide case. Her body was naked and she had burns to her face, feet and hands. She was also believed to have been sexually assaulted and strangled. She suffered "crushing injuries" to her throat and had a broken nose. Her clothes, cell phone and earbuds were missing, and a partially-burned sneaker was found near her body. None of her clothes were ever recovered, and it is believed that her killer may have taken them when he fled. Foreign DNA was also found at the scene.

According to a local witness, Marcotte stopped at the Mountainside Market on Hubbardston Road in the afternoon for a drink, and was last seen alive walking while talking on her cell phone after 1 PM. Another witness also reported they had seen a vehicle following Marcotte, which had turned around and followed her again on the road on which she was walking. According to authorities, Marcotte put up a "huge struggle" during the attack, which was believed to have occurred between 1 and 3 P.M.

== Investigation and media speculation ==
The murder attracted much attention from the national media, and was often compared to the killing of Karina Vetrano of Queens, New York, who was found murdered under similar circumstances less than a week before. Authorities never officially stated they were believed to be related, however. A suspect, linked by DNA evidence, was arrested and charged in the Vetrano case in February 2017.

Several FBI profilers commented publicly on Marcotte's homicide, saying they believed Marcotte was most likely attacked at random by a stranger, and that the killer most likely lived in or frequented the area surrounding Princeton.

Shortly after Marcotte's murder, investigators opened a 24-hour tip line asking for any information from the public, and received over 1,300 tips. It was stated that Marcotte's attacker had been a male who likely had scratches, cuts and bruises to his face and arms. It was not believed that Marcotte knew her killer; rather, it was suspected to have been a completely random attack. In November 2016, they stated they were seeking additional information about a black or dark-colored SUV that had been seen parked on the road at the time and area where Marcotte was killed.

On December 21, 2016, in Princeton, Marcotte's family released their first official public statement, thanking the community for their support, and announced that the family had set up a website, vanessamarcotte.org, in memory of Marcotte and the establishment of the Vanessa T. Marcotte Foundation.

On February 23, 2017, more than six months after the murder, the Worcester County District Attorney Joseph D. Early Jr. released further details on the investigation, stating that the DNA of Marcotte's killer had been sent to a lab and a profile had been created. It was not revealed how the DNA was obtained. Based on the DNA evidence and witness statements, the suspect in the slaying was a Hispanic male in his late 20s to 30s, with an athletic build, average height and either short or shaved hair. It is also believed the suspect either owned or had access to a dark-colored SUV on the day of the murder and would have had visible injuries to his upper body in the days following the attack.

== Perpetrator ==
On April 15, 2017, at a press release in Princeton, Early announced that Marcotte's alleged killer had been apprehended. Angelo Colon-Ortiz, age 31, of Worcester, Massachusetts, was arrested on April 14 and was arraigned at Leominster District Court on April 18 and placed on a $10 million bail. He faced charges of aggravated assault and assault with intent to rape, as well as a murder charge for which he was indicted by a grand jury on June 23, 2017, in Worcester Superior Court. On July 26, he pled not guilty and was ordered by a judge to be held without bail.

According to authorities, a Massachusetts state police trooper on patrol in Worcester had seen Colon-Ortiz, who matched the description of the suspect, driving a vehicle identical to the one seen on the day of Marcotte's murder. The trooper wrote the license plate number on his hand and followed up by visiting Colon-Ortiz's residence with another police officer the next day. Colon-Ortiz voluntarily provided a DNA sample, which came back a match from DNA that had been found on Marcotte's hands. Colon-Ortiz later claimed that a language barrier led him to provide a DNA sample to police investigators without him giving voluntary consent. On that basis, Colon-Ortiz's attorneys filed a motion to suppress the DNA evidence. On January 11, 2022, Judge Janet Kenton-Walker denied the defense's motion to suppress the DNA evidence.

Colon-Ortiz was born in Puerto Rico and had no criminal record prior to the murder. He was married with three children and had lived in Worcester for less than a year. He worked for a third-party contractor of FedEx, and made deliveries in and was familiar with the town of Princeton and surrounding areas. According to his Worcester neighbors, Colon-Ortiz was described as "perverted" and often made vulgar sexual comments to people in the neighborhood. A former female Princeton postal worker also said that Colon-Ortiz often made crude comments in Spanish about her and other women to his co-worker.

Authorities revealed on the day of the murder, a local resident recalled seeing Colon-Ortiz outside his parked black SUV with the hood up, talking on his cell phone, around 12:45 p.m. Cell phone records and data proved that Colon-Ortiz was indeed in the area at that time. Marcotte was believed to have left her home around 1:15. The resident drove by the vehicle again around 2:05 p.m., and the SUV was still parked there, but with the hood back down and no one around. Marcotte's cellphone data showed her phone either was shut off or disabled at 2:11 p.m., which was most likely near the exact time of her death. Colon-Ortiz, who usually worked the morning shift, was not working the day of the murder. It is unknown why he was in the area that day.

== Confession and sentencing ==
Colon-Ortiz plead guilty to Marcotte's murder (second-degree murder and unarmed robbery, the official charges) and was sentenced to life in prison on November 2, 2022. Colon-Ortiz, 36 at the time of sentencing, will not be eligible for parole until 2067, when he will be 81 years of age.

== See also ==
- List of homicides in Massachusetts
