= Shirley Chisholm State Park =

State park in Brooklyn, New York

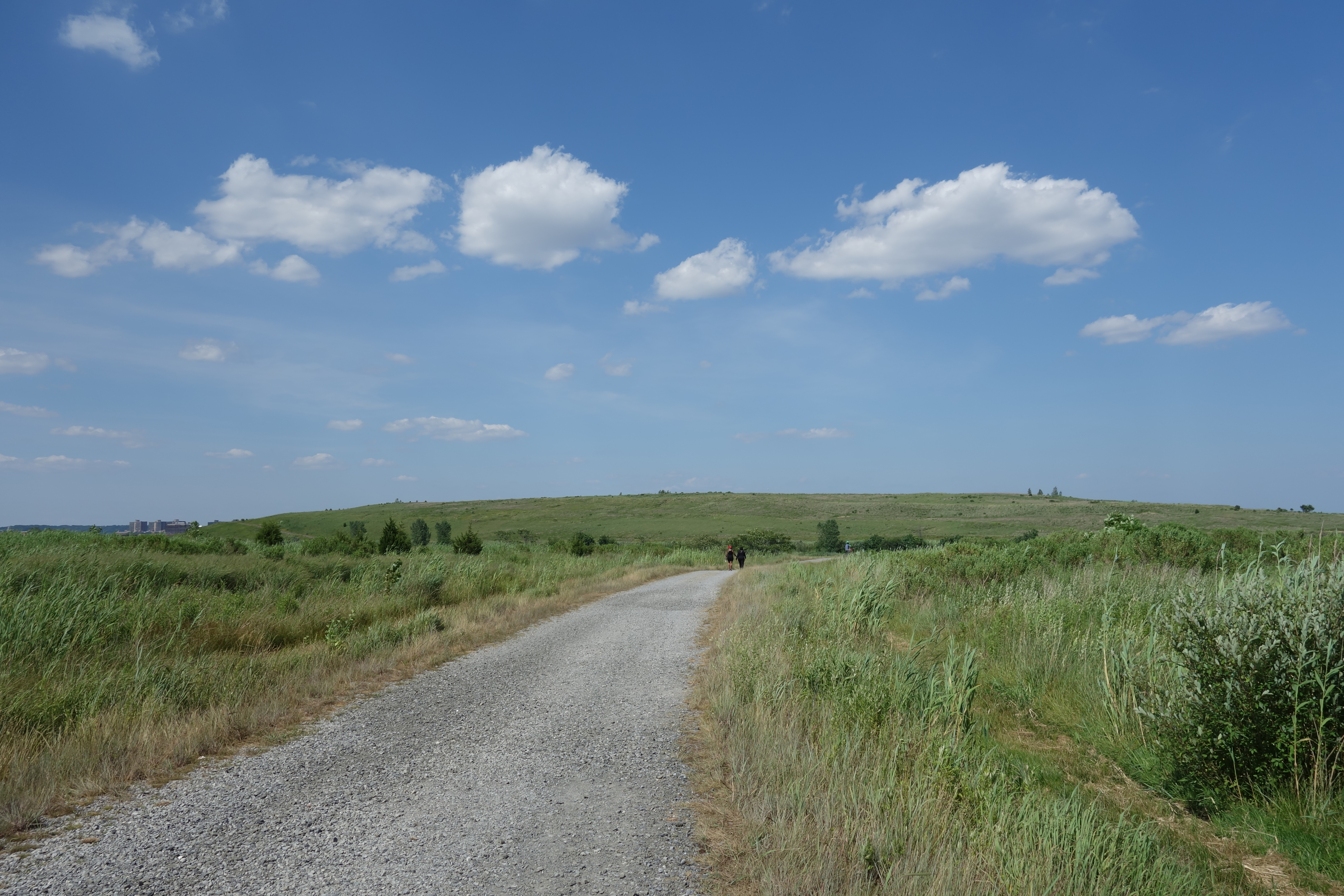
- The Pennsylvania Avenue section of the park in 2019; the Fountain Avenue portion is in the background.

- Location within New York City
- Type: State park
- Location: Spring Creek, Brooklyn, New York, United States
- Coordinates: 40°38′35″N 73°52′32″W
- Area: 407 acres (165 ha)
- Created: July 2019
- Operator: New York State Office of Parks, Recreation and Historic Preservation
- Open: All year, 9 a.m. to dusk
- Status: Open and Active
- Website: https://parks.ny.gov/parks/200/details.aspx

Shirley Chisholm State Park is a 407-acre (1.65 km^{2}) state park in southeastern Brooklyn, New York City. It is bound by Belt Parkway and Spring Creek Park to the north and Jamaica Bay to the south, situated atop the former Pennsylvania Avenue and Fountain Avenue Landfills. The first sections of the park opened in 2019.

== Description ==
Located on the site of the former Pennsylvania Avenue and Fountain Avenue Landfills, Shirley Chisholm State Park covers two peninsulas south of the Belt Parkway. The western peninsula, between Fresh Creek to the west and Hendrix Creek to the east, is located just south of Starrett City. The eastern peninsula, between Hendrix Creek to the west and Spring Creek to the east, is located south of Gateway Center and the neighborhood of Spring Creek. The park is named after Shirley Chisholm, who represented the area as the first black U.S. congresswoman, and later became the first black female to seek a major-party nomination for U.S. president.

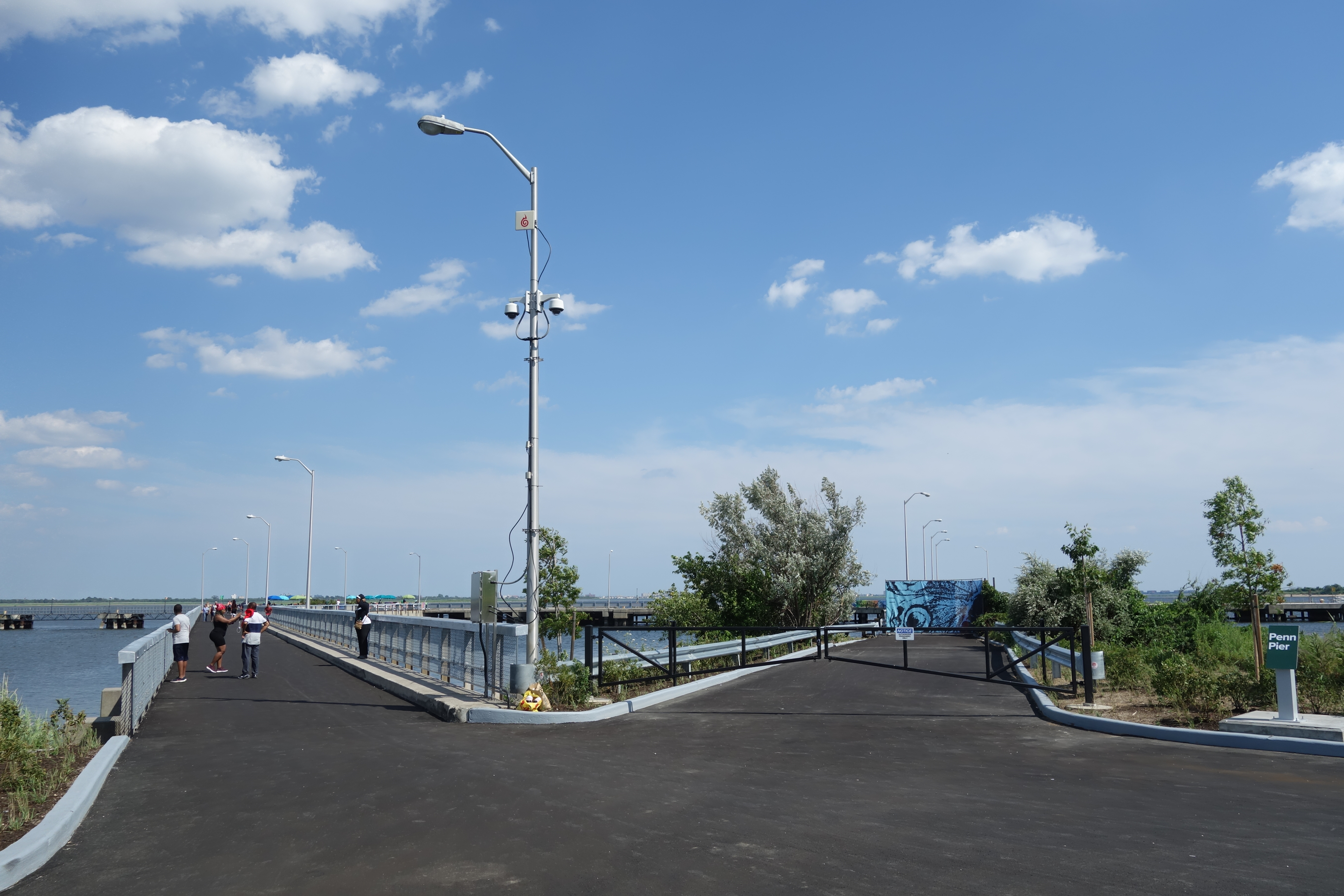
Penn Pier, part of the first phase of the park, in July 2019

At 407 acres (165 ha), the park is the largest state park in New York City. In addition, it is the third-largest park in Brooklyn, behind Marine Park and Prospect Park. The highest point in the modern-day state park is on the Fountain Avenue Landfill at 140 feet (43 m) above sea level. The terrain of the park was intended to withstand the high winds in the Jamaica Bay estuary. From the park, the Empire State Building is visible to the north, Jamaica Bay is visible to the south and the Verrazzano–Narrows Bridge is visible to the west.

The initial phase cost $20 million and includes 10 miles (16 km) of bike paths and hiking trails, waterfront access points, and a pier at the head of Pennsylvania Avenue on the western peninsula. Shirley Chisholm State Park also includes a "bike library" operated by Bike New York, which allows park users to borrow refurbished bikes for free, and a mural of Chisholm created by Brooklyn artist Danielle Mastrion. The second phase of the park opened a few months later with an entrance on Fountain Avenue, as well as additional educational programming.

== Site history ==
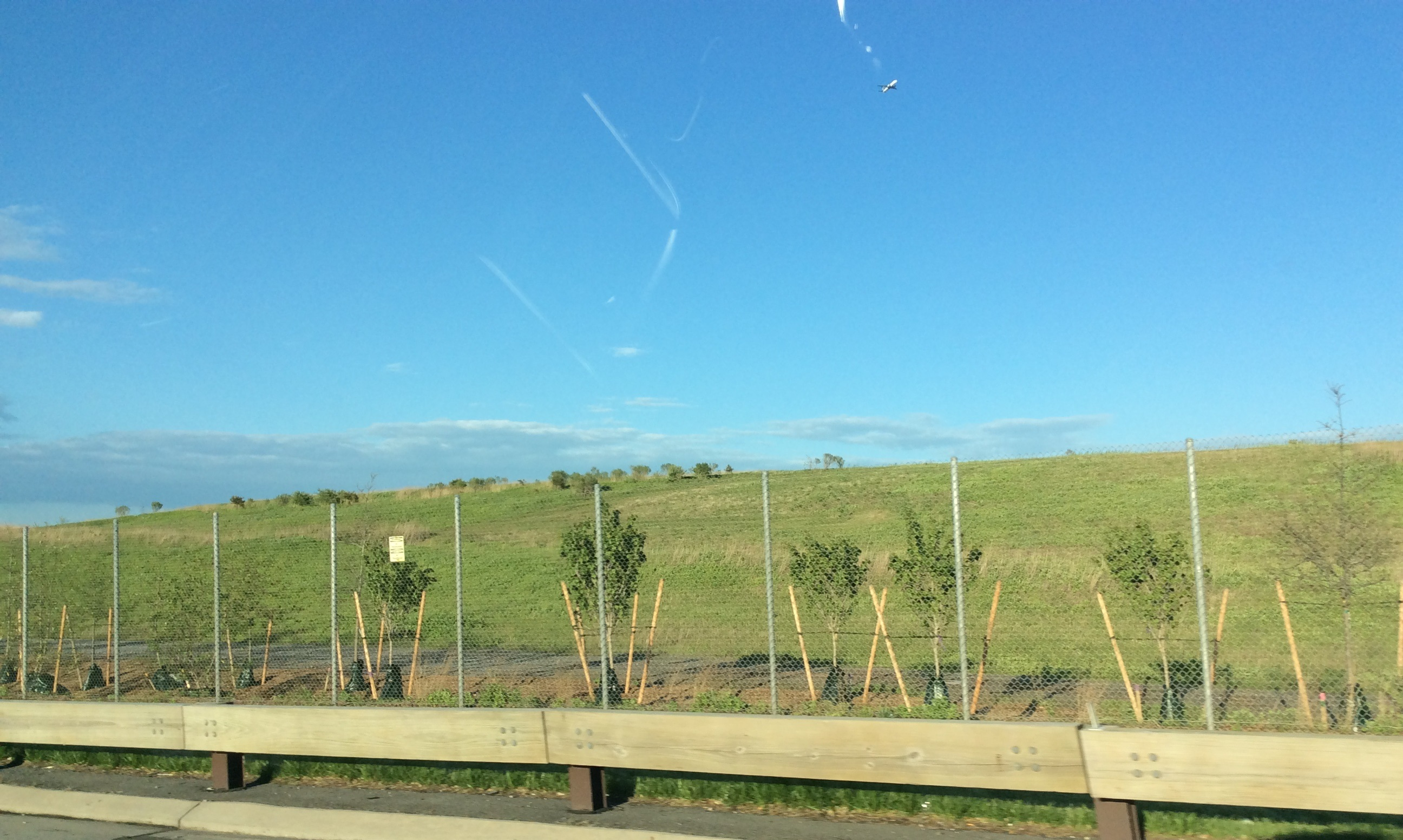
The Pennsylvania Avenue Landfill in 2017, prior to the park's establishment

Before development, the site of this park was mostly marshland and water. However, in 1930, Spring Creek Park and the Shore Parkway portion of the Belt Parkway were proposed by Robert Moses, along with several other parks and highways. Accordingly, in August 1942, the New York City Planning Commission and Board of Estimate approved a project to dump landfill on the site as part of the city's post-World War II program to create parkland on the site.

Filling at the Pennsylvania Avenue Landfill began in 1956, while the Fountain Avenue Landfill began operations in 1961 or 1963. At the height of usage, more than 8,000 short tons (7,300 t) of trash arrived daily at these two landfills, with nearly 40 percent of the city's refuse. Throughout the landfills' operation, waste oil and other hazardous materials such as PCBs were dumped in the landfills, resulting in the spread of respiratory diseases among residents of nearby Starrett City. In 1972, the Gateway National Recreation Area was established by the National Park Service around Jamaica Bay. The two landfill sites were included in the Gateway Area in 1974. As part of creating the preserve, the Department of Sanitation was contractually bound to close and cap both landfills by 1985. By 1974, plans emerged to eventually turn the landfills into parks. The Pennsylvania Avenue Landfill was closed in 1979, at a time when it was receiving 1,000 to 2,000 short tons (910 to 1,810 t) of municipal waste every day. The Fountain Avenue Landfill was closed in December 1985.

The landfills were declared a Superfund site around 1990, and in 1991 the New York City Department of Environmental Protection (NYCDEP) assumed responsibility for the cleanup of the landfills. In 1995 Jamaica Bay residents, concerned about health implications of the runoff from the landfills, reached an agreement with the city for the dumps' rehabilitation. In 2002, the New York City Department of Environmental Protection commenced site remediation at a cost of US$235 million including the installation of a below ground barrier and an impermeable cap to support future use, along with a layer of new soil planted with 33,000 shrubs and trees. Following the opening of Gateway Center mall on the site in 2002, The Related Companies constructed an addition to Spring Creek Park circumscribing the mall, opening on May 2, 2003. Afterward, the first tree seeds on the site were planted in the Pennsylvania Avenue Landfill with a density of 800 to 1,000 per acre (2,000 to 2,500/ha). Over 1,200,000 cubic yards (920,000 m^{3}) of fresh soil was spread across the landfill at a depth of up to 4 feet (1.2 m), and some 35,000 plantings and grassland species were placed in the soil. Hendrix Creek was also cleaned up by the NYCDEP.

== Development ==
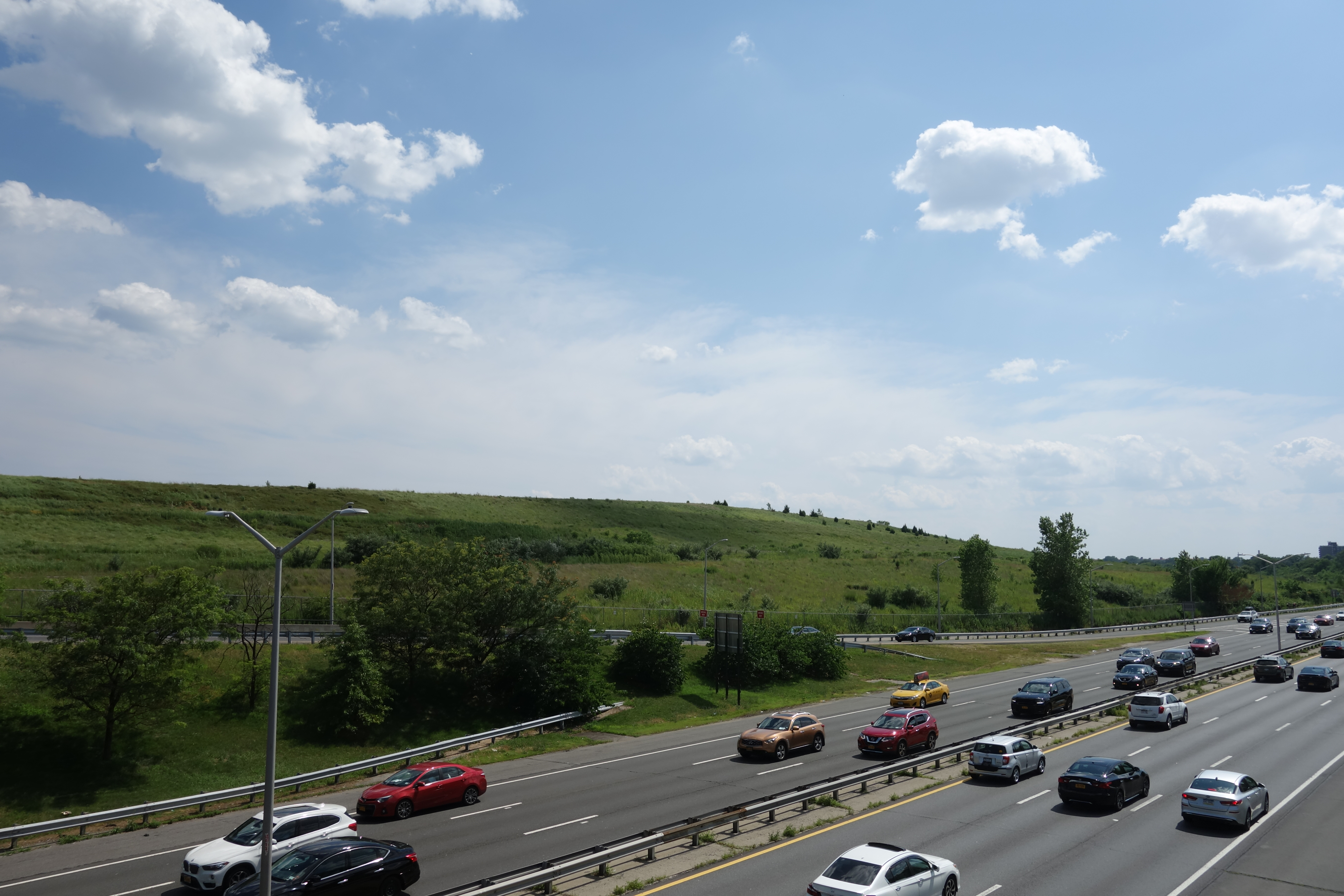
The Fountain Avenue Landfill (pictured in 2019) was developed into the second portion of the park opened in 2021.

In his State of the State address in January 2018, Governor Andrew Cuomo announced his intent to build a 407-acre (165 ha) state park along 3.5 miles (5.6 km) of the Jamaica Bay coastline, adjoining the Pennsylvania Avenue and Fountain Avenue landfills. The site would receive a $15 million renovation with paths, concession areas, restrooms, and recreational facilities designed by Michael Van Valkenburgh Associates, Landscape Architects. The state would work with the city and National Park Service on the project. The state park was dedicated to Shirley Chisholm that September. Another $20 million was allotted to the park in April 2019.

On July 2, 2019, the governor and other public officials representing the park site attended a ribbon-cutting ceremony at the Shirley Chisholm State Park, officially opening the park to the public. The first portion of the park comprises the Pennsylvania Avenue Landfill; the second portion, the Fountain Avenue Landfill opened a few months later. At the time, the park was expected to be completed by 2021. The Engineering News-Record gave Shirley Chisholm State Park an "award of merit" for landscape design in November 2021. The American Society of Landscape Architects (ASLA) gave Shirley Chisolm State Park and its landscape architect, Michael Van Valkenburgh Associates, an Honor Award for Urban Design in 2022.

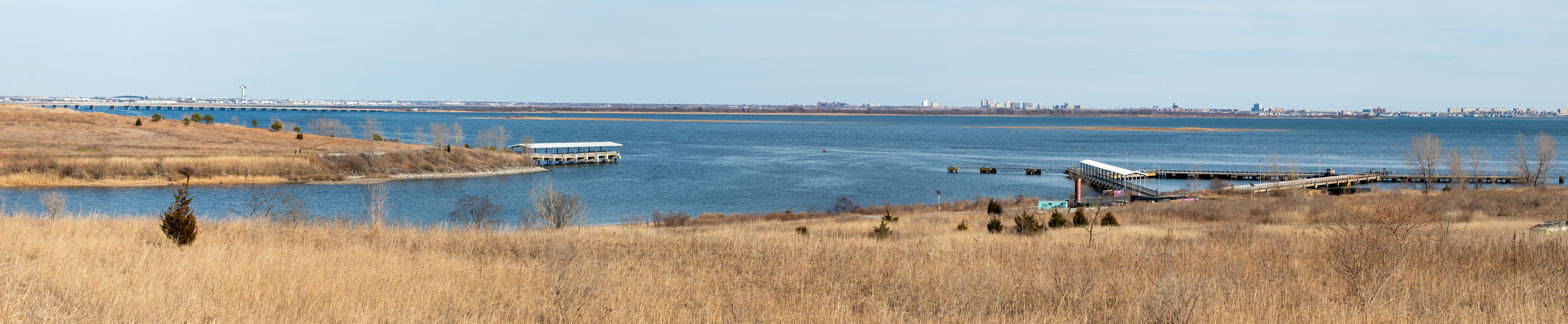
Panoramic view of the park, looking south toward Jamaica Bay
