= B84 (New York City bus) =

Bus route in Brooklyn, New York

b84
- Spring Creek-East New York Line; Flatlands Avenue Line
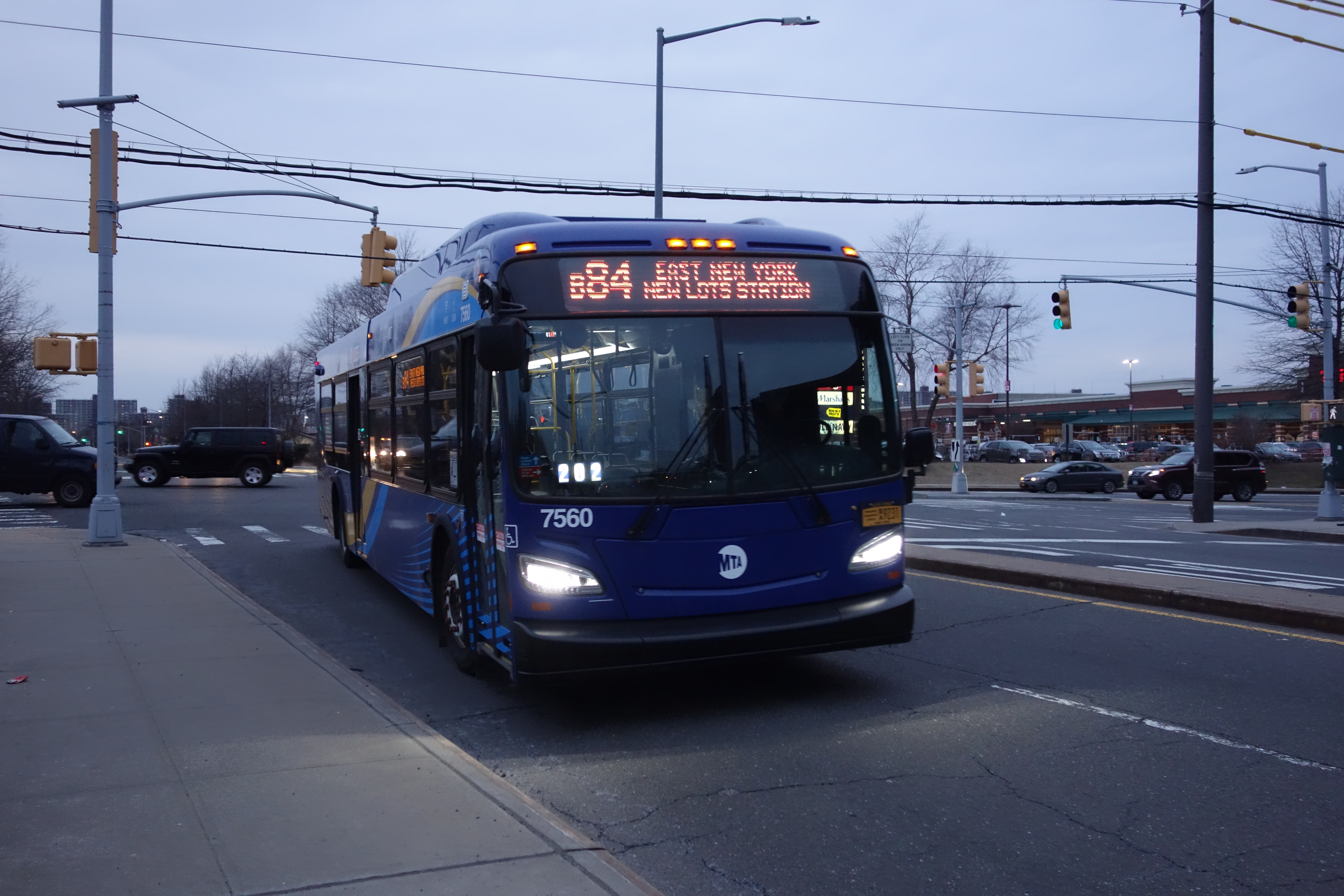
- A 2018 XD40 (7560) on the New Lots-bound B84 bus entering service at Seaview Avenue/Erskine Street in February 2019.

Overview
- System: MTA Regional Bus Operations
- Operator: New York City Transit Authority
- Garage: East New York Depot
- Vehicle: New Flyer Xcelsior XD40; New Flyer Xcelsior XDE40; New Flyer Xcelsior XE40; Orion VII NG HEV
- Began service: June 30, 2013

Route
- Locale: Brooklyn, New York, U.S.
- Communities served: East New York, Spring Creek
- Start: Spring Creek - Gateway Center Mall
- Via: Flatlands Avenue, Ashford Street
- End: East New York - Livonia Avenue and Warwick Street
- Length: 2.2 miles (3.5 km)
- Other routes: B6 Bay Parkway/Avenue J/Cozine Avenue

Service
- Operates: All times except late nights
- Annual patronage: 77,417 (2025)
- Transfers: Yes
- Timetable: B84

The Flatlands Avenue Line, consisting of the B84, is a public transit line in Brooklyn in New York City, running mostly on Flatlands Avenue right between East New York and Spring Creek. The route began operating in 2013, replicating the B83 route in East New York through Jerome Street and Berriman Street.

== Route description ==
The bus route begins at Gateway Center Mall, and uses Seaview Avenue until it turns onto Fountain Avenue. It then goes on until it turns to Flatlands Avenue, and continues on the avenue until it turns to Jerome Street, then Cozine Avenue, and finally Ashford Street. It then continues until it turns right on Hegeman Avenue, left on Cleveland Street, and again on Livonia Avenue. It then continues for a short stretch, until it ends.

For buses heading to Gateway Center Mall, they turn onto Warwick Street and New Lots Avenue to access Ashford Street. It then goes on the same route, until it reaches Vandalia Avenue, where it turns right on. It then turns left on Erskine Street, and continues until it ends there.

== History ==
The B84 was created as a new route on June 30, 2013, and it replicates the B83 bus between Jerome Street and Berryman Street. A public hearing on the proposed route took place on March 7, 2013.

On December 1, 2022, the Metropolitan Transportation Authority released a draft redesign of the Brooklyn bus network. As part of the redesign, a new B5 bus route would replace the B84, which would be eliminated.

== See also ==
- B6, B15 (at New Lots Avenue)
- B20, BM5 (at Linden Boulevard)
- B13, B83, Q8 (at Gateway Mall)
