= Gateway Center (Brooklyn) =

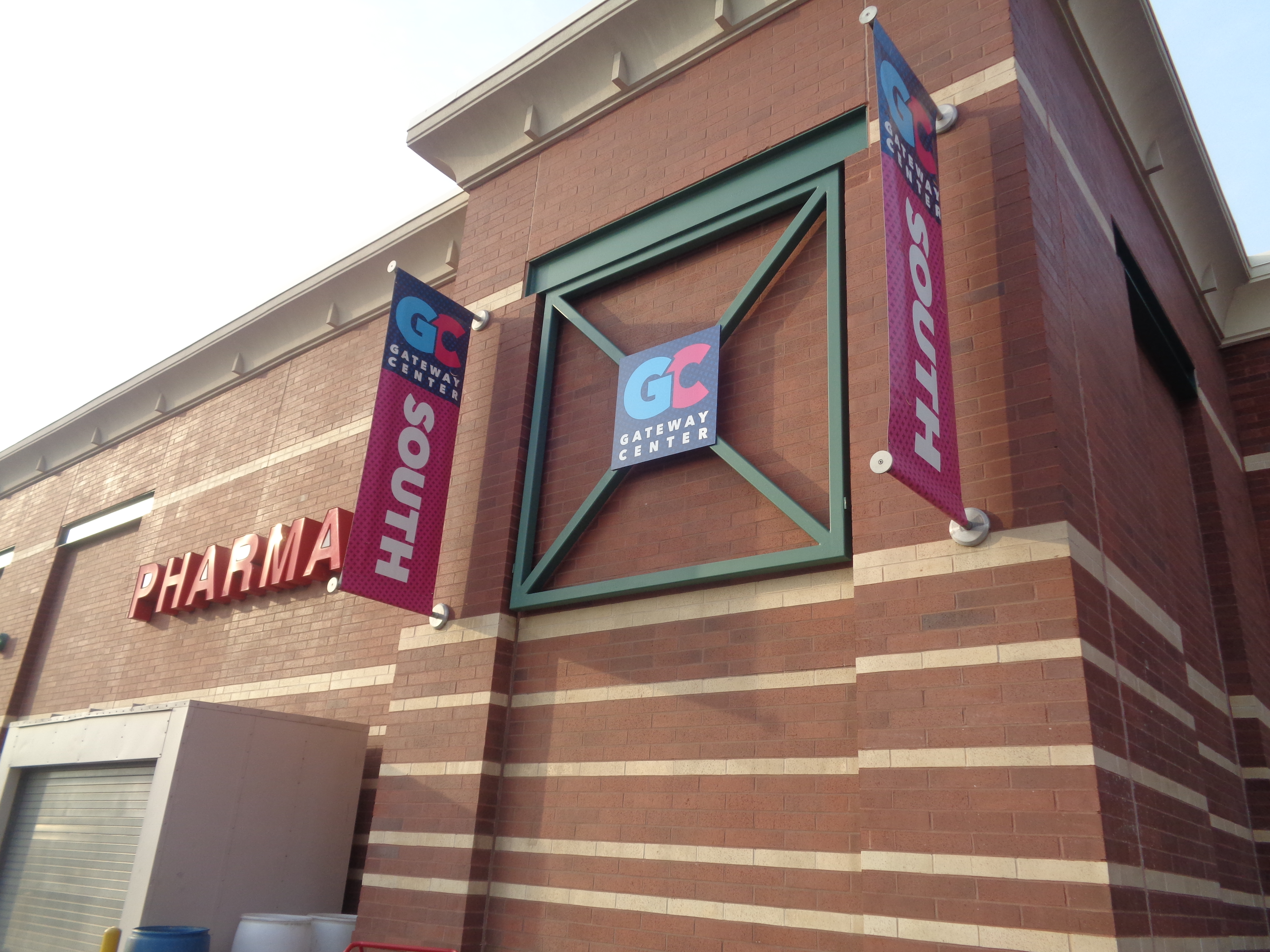
- Coordinates: 40.651943°N 73.870592°W
- Address: 501 Gateway Drive; Brooklyn, New York, 11239
- Opened: October 1, 2002; 24 years ago August 1, 2014; 12 years ago (Gateway Center North)
- Developer: Gateway Center Properties (The Related Companies, Blackacre Capital Management)
- Owner: The Related Companies
- Num. of stores: 51
- Public transit: New York City Bus: B13, B83, B84; MTA Bus Company: Q8; New York City Subway: at New Lots Avenue (via B84)
- Website: shopgatewaycenterbrooklyn.com

Gateway Center, also referred to as Gateway Plaza Mall or simply Gateway Mall, is a shopping complex in the Spring Creek section of East New York, Brooklyn, in New York City. It is located just north of the Belt Parkway at Erskine Street and Gateway Drive, which is near portions of the Gateway National Recreation Area. Built as part of the Gateway Estates plan for commercial and retail development, it consists of two structures: the original structure opened in 2002 (now called Gateway Center South), and a second adjacent development opened in 2014 (called Gateway Center North or Gateway Center II).

== Location ==
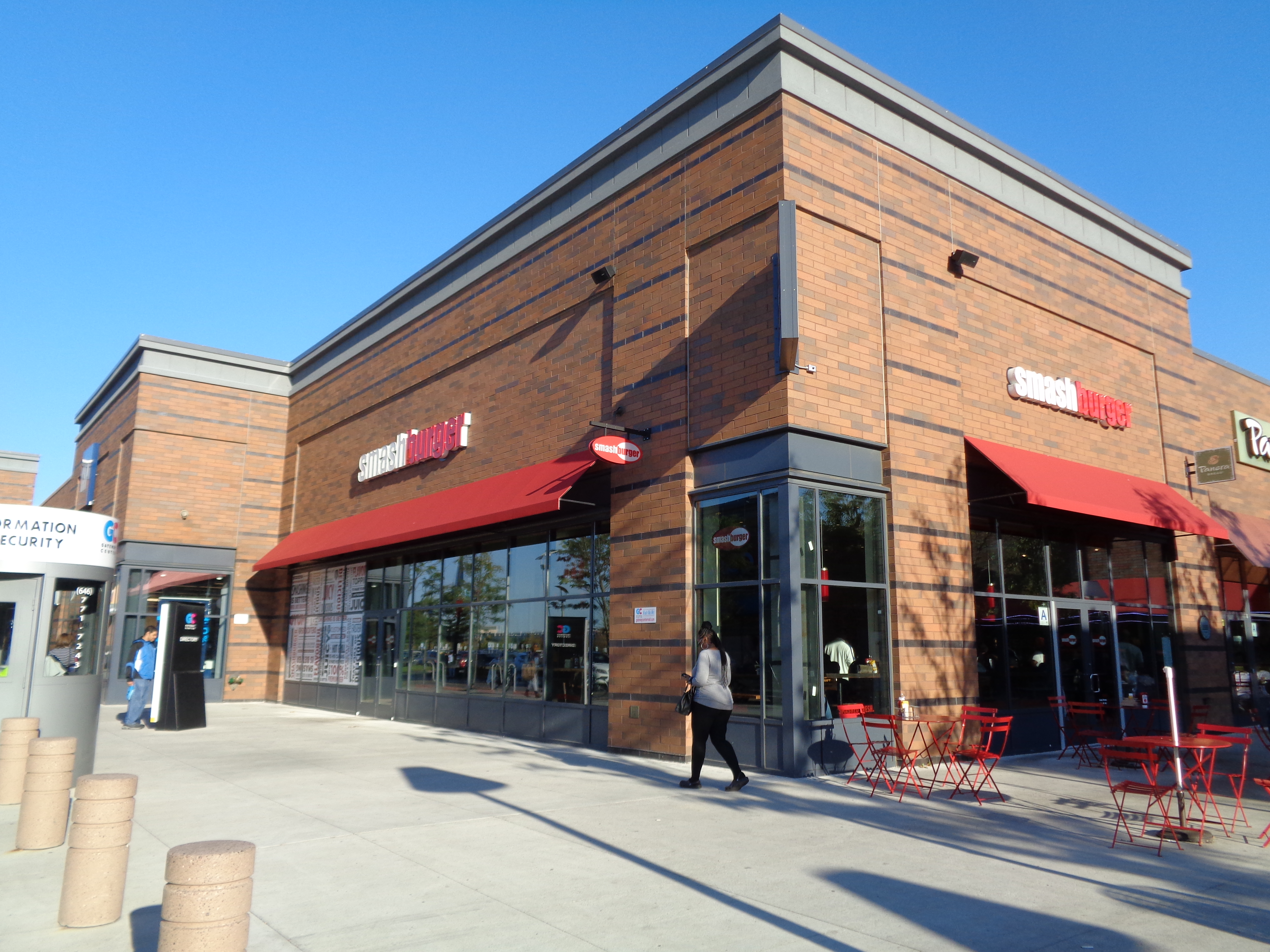
A Smashburger restaurant in Gateway Center North

The Gateway Center complex, constructed under the Gateway Estates development plan for Spring Creek, is bounded by Erskine Street to the east, and a road now called Gateway Drive to the south and west, which follows the right of way of Seaview Avenue traveling east-to-west. An access road and parking lot form its northern boundary. It is located just north of the Belt Parkway and can be accessed by the parkway's Exit 15, which leads to Erskine Street.

The original mall (Gateway Center South), which opened in 2002, consists of a 640,000-square-foot (59,000 m^{2}) complex, with a large parking lot and three separate structures to the south along Gateway Drive. It is anchored by several major stores, including Target, The Home Depot, Best Buy, and BJ's Wholesale Club. The newer northern complex (Gateway Center North), which opened in 2014, is similarly sized at 605,000 square feet (56,200 m^{2}), with a second parking lot, four small adjacent buildings for small outlets, a fifth structure for an Applebee's, and a sixth for a bank. Tenants of this section, which opened in stages in late 2014, include JCPenney, TJ Maxx, ShopRite, and Aldi.

The two-part complex was envisioned as a suburban-style strip mall. The southern complex was designed by GreenbergFarrow Architects. The northern complex was designed by GreenbergFarrow as well as the Perkins Eastman firm. Both main structures are designed in Georgian architectural style, with brick outer facades and green trim. GreenbergFarrow also designed Related's Gateway Center at Bronx Terminal Market.

The mall is located north of the former Fountain Avenue Landfill (now re-developed as Shirley Chisholm State Park) and was constructed on part of 230 acres of former landfill, which characterized Spring Creek for much of the 20th century. Located across Erskine Street to the east is the Brooklyn Developmental Center. Just north of the complex are Nehemiah Spring Creek and Gateway Elton, two affordable housing developments which were planned and constructed along with the mall as part of the Gateway Estates project. West of the mall across Hendrix Creek is Starrett City (now known as Spring Creek Towers), accessible via the Belt Parkway to the south, or Flatlands Avenue to the north. Spring Creek Educational Campus, which houses two New York City high schools, is also located north at Flatlands Avenue and Elton Street.

Gateway Center South currently neighbors the new housing development The Fountain Seaview from Progressive Management, who opened its residency to tenants and currently filled vacancy of retail vendors on the corner of Erskine Street and Gateway Drive since 2022. The Erskine Shops on the street level (opposite Home Depot) features an outlet of restaurants and free parking. Though not part of Gateway Center, it may be utilized as an expansion. As of 2023 the current retail vacancy filled are Five Guys, Red Crab Juicy Seafood, Sally's Restaurant and a new addition to the Dallas BBQ restaurant chain, which opened in early 2024. More retail and housing are currently in phase developments surrounding the mall. The Alafia Housing Development Phase 1A began development on Erskine street and completed by late 2024. It neighbors Gateway Center and The Fountain Seaview/Erskine shops. It will welcome a few large and small retail spaces as well as a medical facility, which may also be utilized as expansions, though not part of Gateway Center.

=== Transportation ===
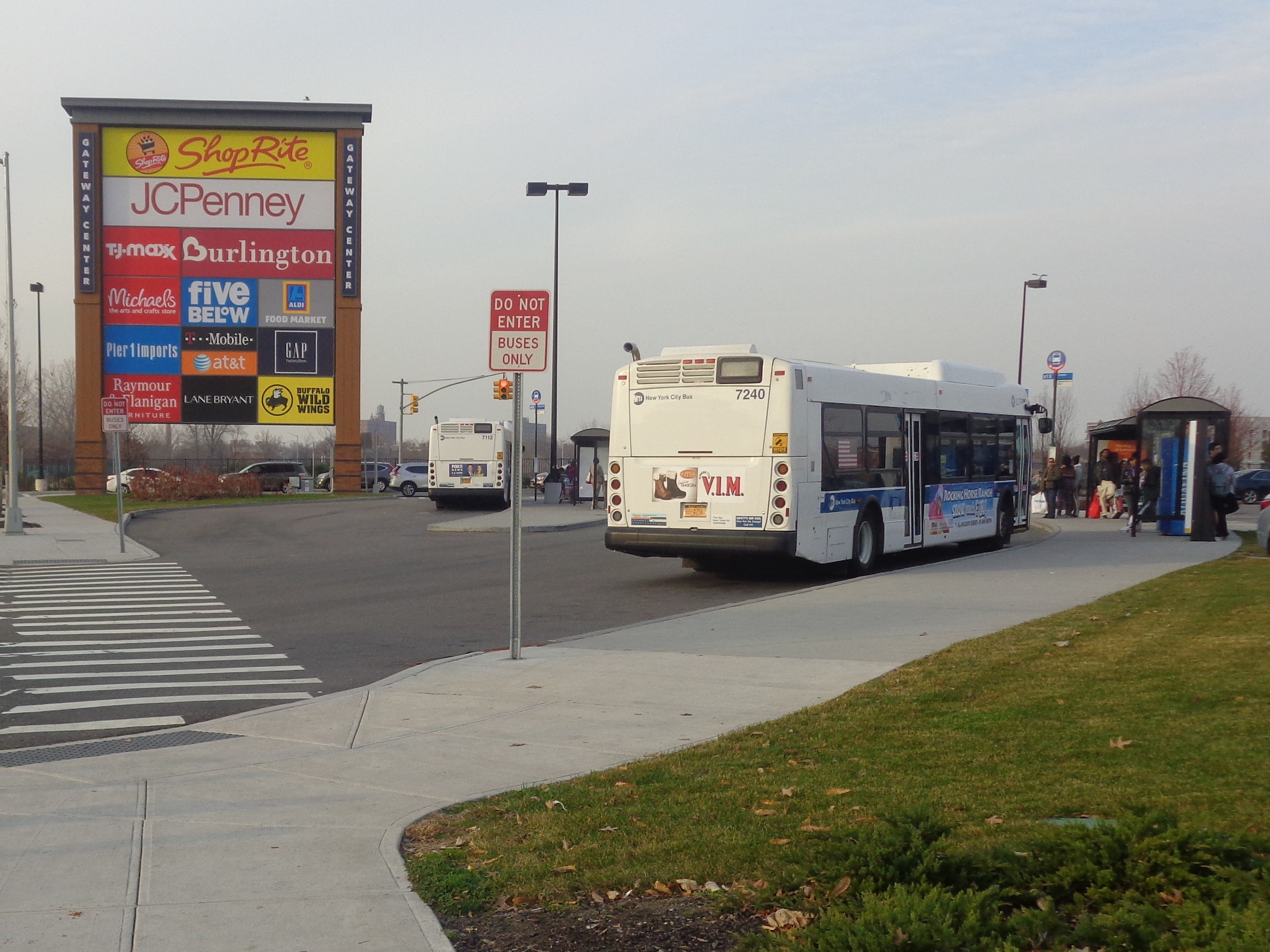
The bus terminal at Gateway Center North.

The mall is served directly by the B13, B83, B84 and Q8 buses. Formerly terminating at Erskine Street near the Brooklyn Developmental Center, the B13, B83, and Q8 were extended to a new bus terminal area at the west end of Gateway Center North in August 2014. The B84, meanwhile, was created in June 2013 to serve the Spring Creek neighborhood.

The closest New York City Subway stations to the mall are New Lots Avenue in East New York, served by the 2, 3, 4, and 5 trains (connected by the B84 bus), and Rockaway Parkway in Canarsie, served by the L train.

== History ==
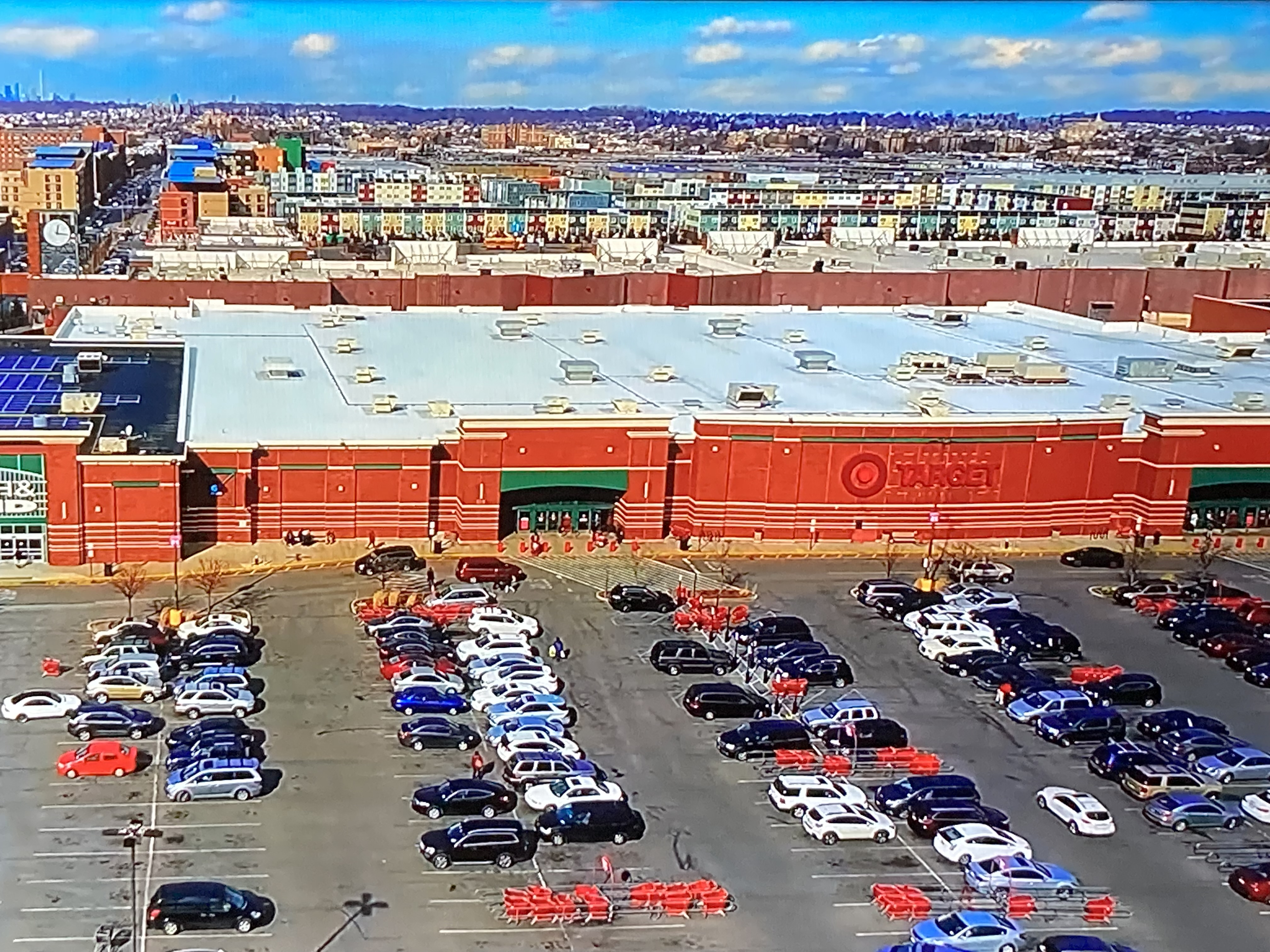
Drone view of the Target off of Erskine Street.

The area that is now Gateway Mall, along with most of the Spring Creek neighborhood, originally consisted of marshland and creeks. The Milford Street Landfill existed on the site from the 1930s to 1950. Afterwards, the land remained vacant and was frequently used as illegal dumping grounds. The former landfill became known as the Vandalia Dunes due to its sandy landscape, and became a habitat for the Henslow's sparrow and other bird species. The area became the Fresh Creek Urban Renewal Area in 1967. In 1989, the tract was acquired by Starrett Housing Corporation—the managers of Starrett City, which opened in 1974—for mixed-income housing construction. Although this plan was to be the predecessor to the current housing program in the area, the land was never developed.

On June 25, 1996, the New York City Council amended the original Fresh Creek Urban Renewal Plan to facilitate the development of the Gateway Estates plan, which included what would become the Gateway Center. Ground broke on the Gateway Center project on November 16, 2000. It was the first phase of the major redevelopment and restoration of the Spring Creek area (including the Gateway Houses, the Spring Creek Campus, and Spring Creek Park) that was originally proposed in the late 1980s, and part of an initiative to reduce crime and blight and create jobs in East New York. The 640,000 square-foot structure was planned as a suburban-style strip mall. characterized by brick facades and Georgian design features. It was developed by The Related Companies, which is also a development partner in two large Manhattan properties: the Time Warner Center at Columbus Circle, and the Hudson Yards Redevelopment Project. During the building of the mall, a new exit interchange for the Belt Parkway was constructed at the south end of Erskine Street at a cost of $25 million. It opened on October 1, 2002, at the cost of $192 million, and created 1,700 new jobs. As part of the project, Related Companies also constructed an addition to Spring Creek Park circumscribing the mall, opening on May 2, 2003. Following the mall's opening, several bus routes were extended to serve the area: the B13 in April 2003, the B83 in September 2007, and the Q8 in June 2008.

In early 2007, Related Companies proposed the second phase of the Gateway Center, a similarly sized complex to the first phase, which would include an additional parking lot and bus terminal area. In March 2009, the New York City Council rezoned 21 acres (8.5 ha) land to be allocated for the project. In 2010, it was reported that Walmart would be seeking to establish its first New York City location at Gateway, after years of local opposition. In spite of some polls that showed positive approval ratings for a Walmart location among residents of Brooklyn and the entire city, the plan was canceled due to opposition from local residents, and the developers signed ShopRite as an anchor instead. Construction on the expansion began in early 2014, opening in stages beginning on August 1 of that year. A third expansion was planned in 2015.

On May 9, 2024, it was announced that Nordstrom Rack would close at the Gateway Center Mall in August 2024. Outback Steakhouse closed in June 2024. A Chick-fil-A opened that December, and a LiDL grocery supermarket opened in January 2025.
