= B20 and B83 buses =

Bus routes in Brooklyn, New York

b20, b83
- Pennsylvania Avenue
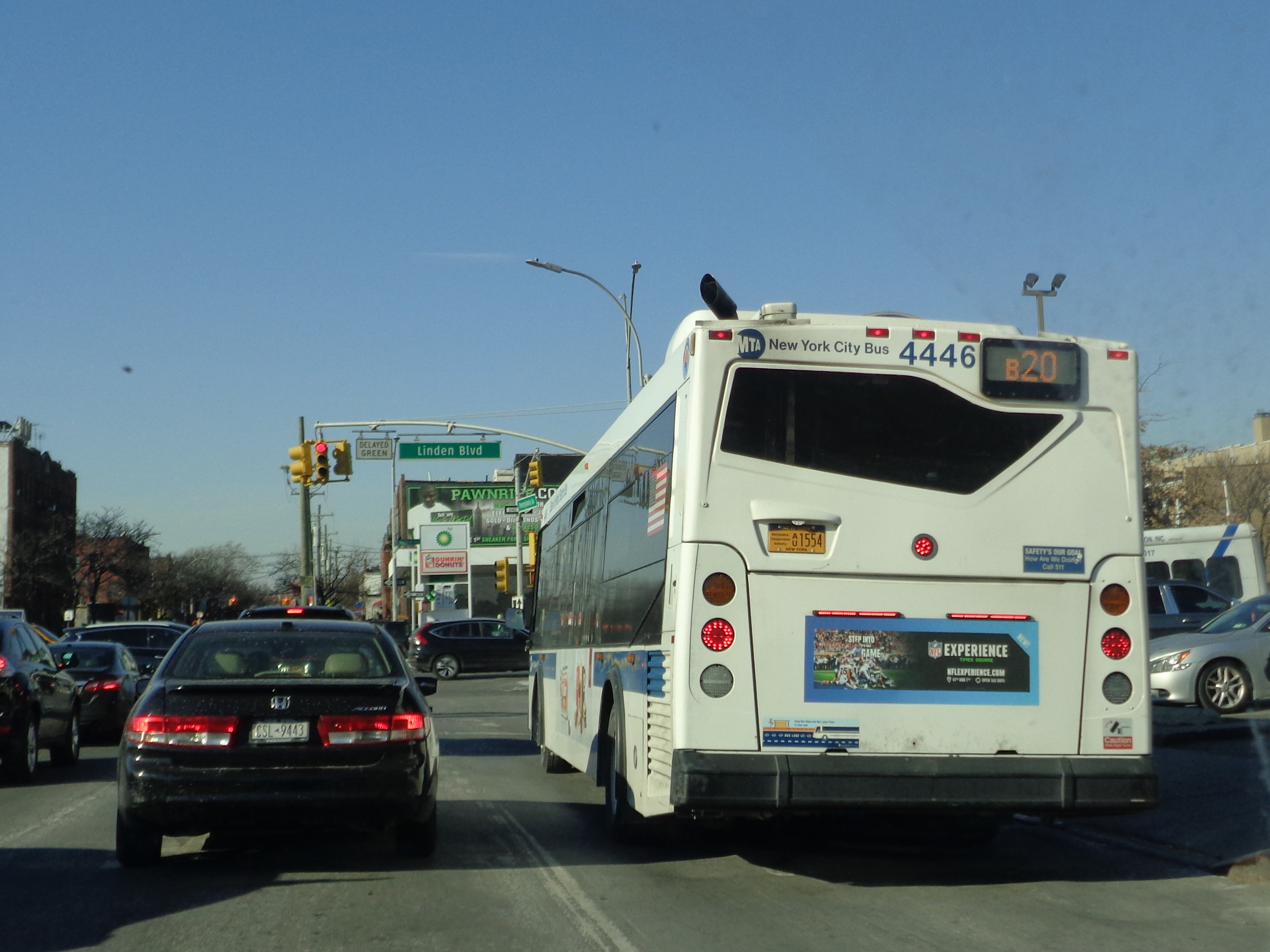
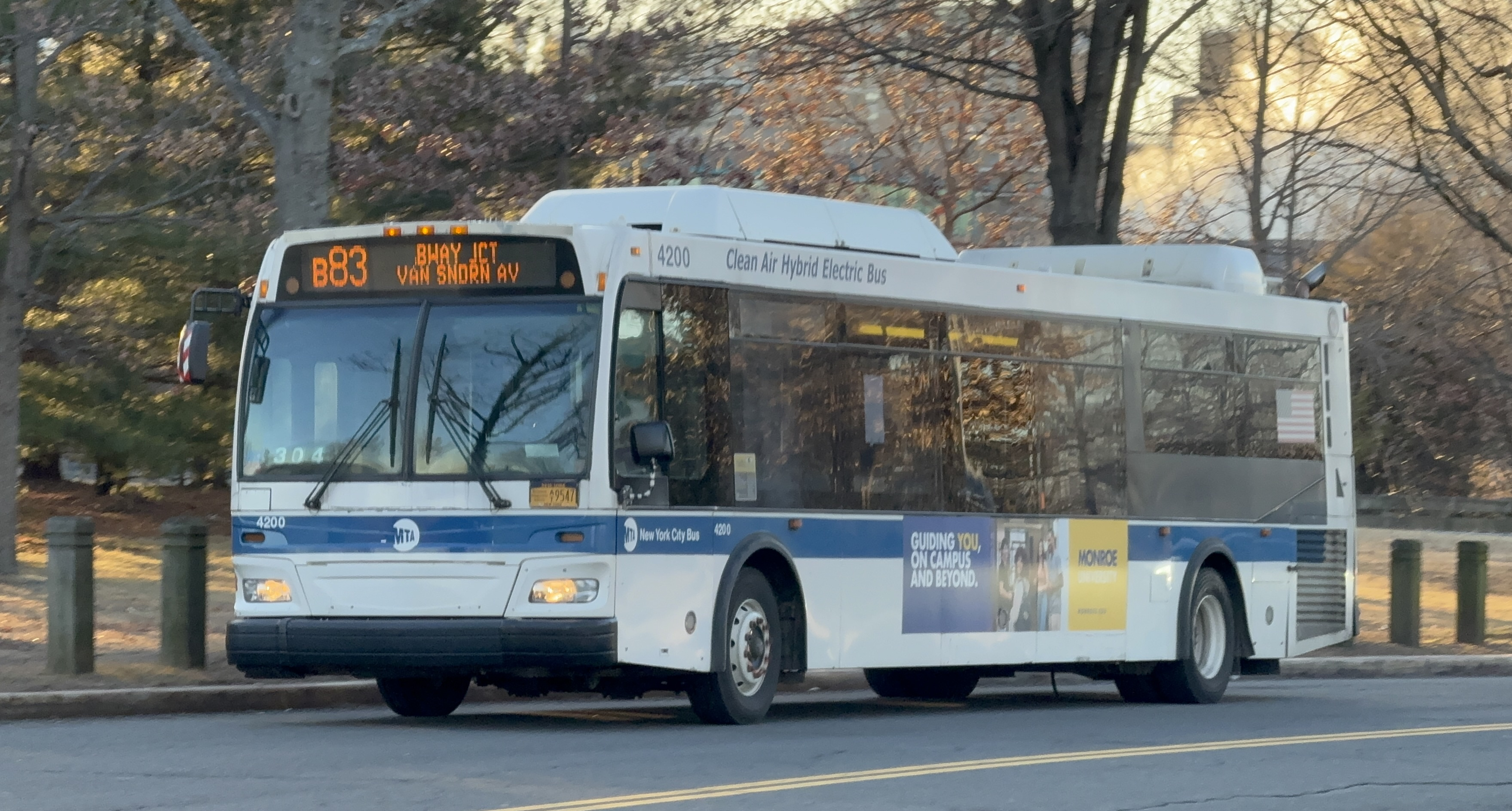
- A 2009 Orion VII NG HEV (4446) on the Ridgewood-bound B20 at Pennsylvania Avenue/Linden Boulevard in February 2018, and a 2009 Orion VII NG HEV (4200) on the B83 leaving Gateway Mall in February 2025.

Overview
- System: MTA Regional Bus Operations
- Operator: New York City Transit Authority
- Garage: Fresh Pond Depot (B20); East New York Depot (B83)
- Vehicle: New Flyer Xcelsior XD40 (both routes); New Flyer Xcelsior XDE40; New Flyer Xcelsior XE40; Orion VII NG HEV (B83 only)
- Began service: November 30, 1931 (B20); February 27, 1966 (B83)

Route
- Locale: Brooklyn and Queens, New York, U.S.
- Communities served: Ridgewood, Bushwick, East New York, Spring Creek
- Start: Ridgewood - Putnam Avenue & Forest/Fairview Avenues (B20 full route); East New York - Van Sinderen Avenue & Broadway Junction (B20 short turn, B83 full route)
- Via: Summerfield Street (B20 SB), Schaeffer Street (B20 SB), Decatur Street (B20 NB), Pennsylvania Avenue, Wortman Avenue (B20), Linden Boulevard (B20), Van Siclen Avenue (B83), Gateway Drive (B83)
- End: Spring Creek - Gateway Center Mall (B83); Spring Creek - Brooklyn General Mail Facility (B20)
- Length: 4.4 miles (7.1 km) (B20 short turn); 7.3 miles (11.7 km) (B20 full route); 5.3 miles (8.5 km) (B83)

Service
- Operates: All times except late nights
- Annual patronage: 1,005,575 (B20, 2025); 960,613 (B83, 2025)
- Transfers: Yes
- Timetable: B20 B83

The B20 and B83 constitute bus routes between Broadway Junction and East New York, running primarily on Pennsylvania Avenue in Brooklyn, New York City. They are operated by the New York City Transit Authority, with the B20 being based out of the Fresh Pond Depot and the B83 being based out of the East New York Depot.

== Route description ==
=== B20 ===
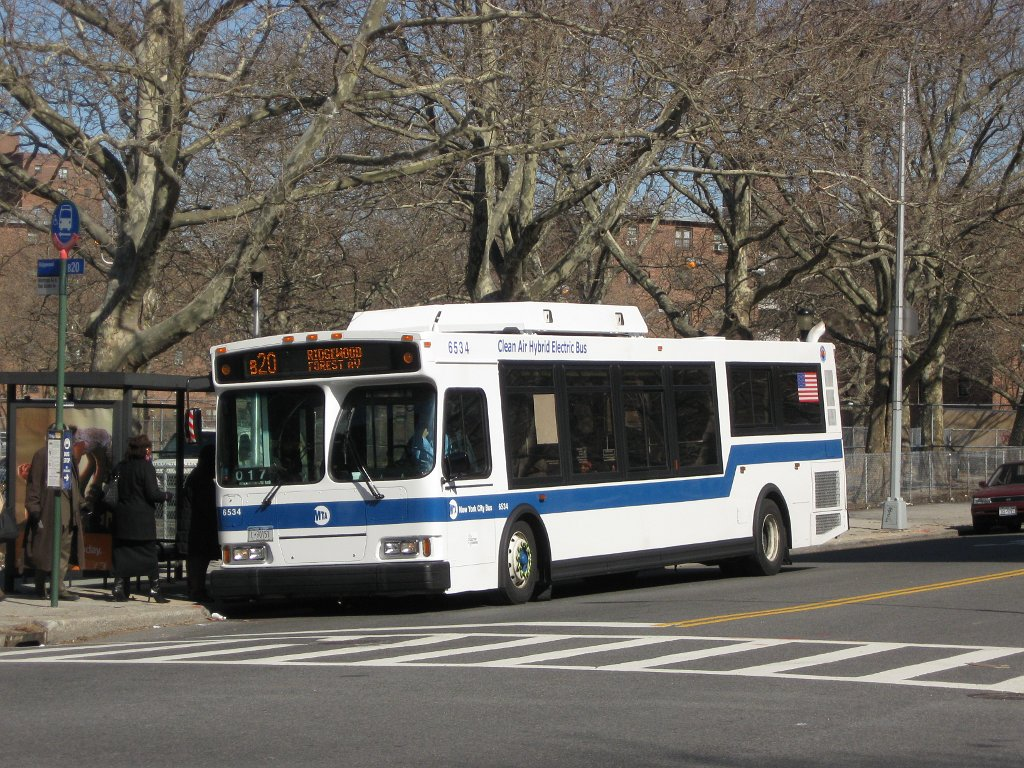
A 2005 Orion VII OG HEV (6534) on the Ridgewood-bound B20 picking up passengers on Wortman Avenue. This bus is retired.

The B20 begins at the Forest Avenue station. The B20 then heads east to Fresh Pond Road, and then turns south on that road to Myrtle Avenue, where it turns right (west). It then heads southwest on Summerfield and Schaefer Streets (Decatur Street northbound), with the southbound route taking a detour at Wyckoff Avenue via Covert Street. After reaching Broadway, it turns east on Broadway until reaching Broadway Junction. It then heads east on Jamaica Avenue, later turning south on Pennsylvania Avenue until Wortman Avenue, where it turns east to serve the Linden Houses until turning north on Ashford Street, then east on Linden Boulevard. After reaching Eldert Lane, it turns south there, and right onto Stanley Avenue, and finally turning left on Postal Facility Road and running on it until reaching it southern terminus at the Brooklyn General Mail Facility.

On weekday afternoons, every other B20 trip only runs between Broadway Junction and Brooklyn General Mail Facility.

=== B83 ===
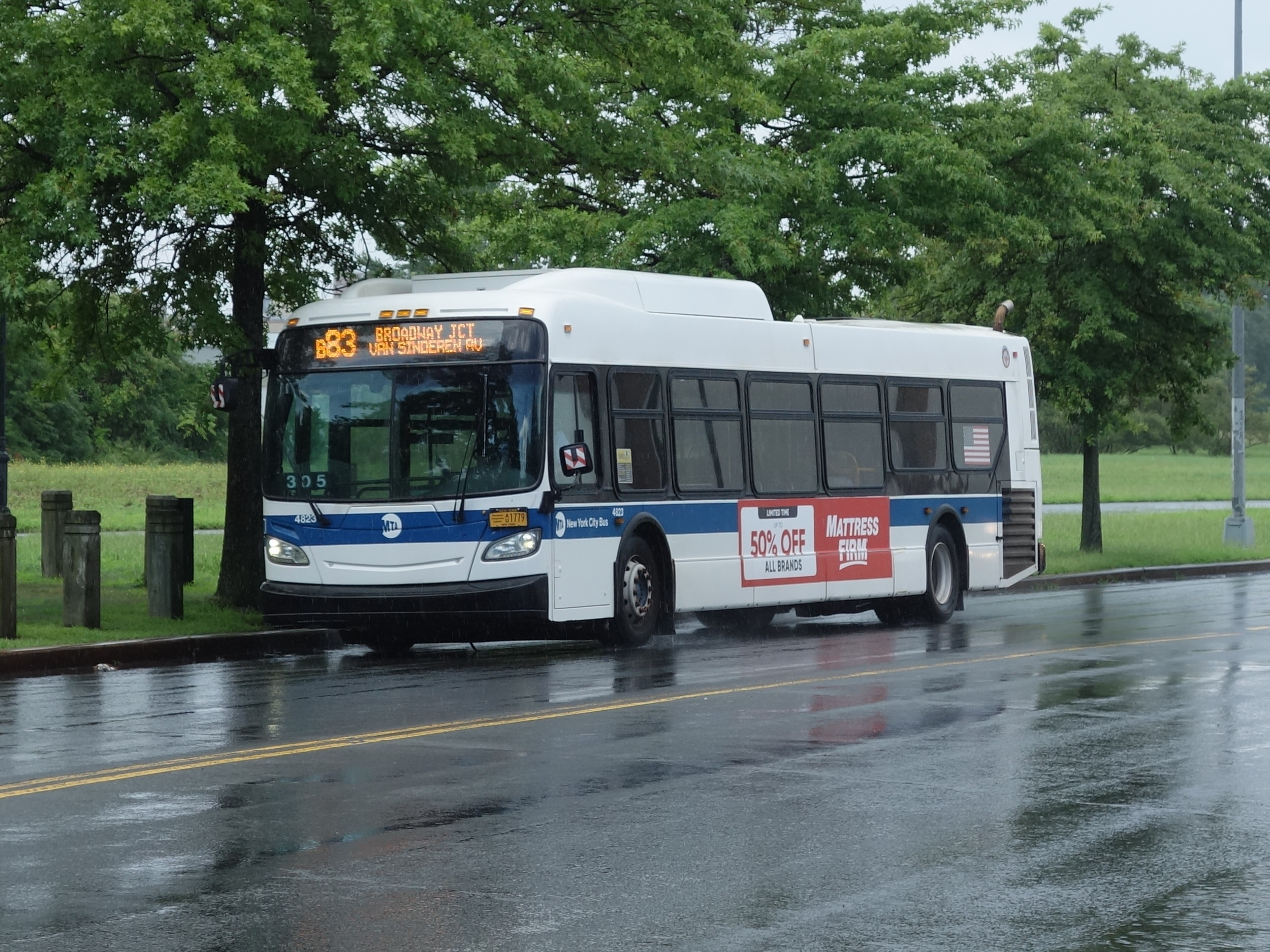
A 2011 XD40 (4823) on the Broadway Junction-bound B83 on Gateway Drive West in August 2018

The B83 begins at Broadway Junction and shares the same route with the B20 until reaching New Lots Avenue. It runs east on New Lots Avenue until Van Siclen Avenue, then running south on it until Vandalia Avenue, which it travels west on to return to running on Pennsylvania Avenue. It runs onto the Belt Parkway and leaves the parkway at the next exit in either direction, and then turns left onto Erskine Street, and left again on Gateway Drive and running on it until reaching the Gateway Center Bus Terminal.

== History ==
The B20 began service on November 30, 1931, by Brooklyn-Manhattan Transit.

In May 1936, service was extended along Pennsylvania Avenue to Linden Boulevard.

It initially operated via Linden Boulevard between Pennsylvania Avenue and Eldert Lane until 1978. It was rerouted in 1978 from Linden Boulevard to serve the Boulevard and Linden Houses via Wortman Avenue between Pennsylvania Avenue and Ashford Street. The rest of route was unchanged.

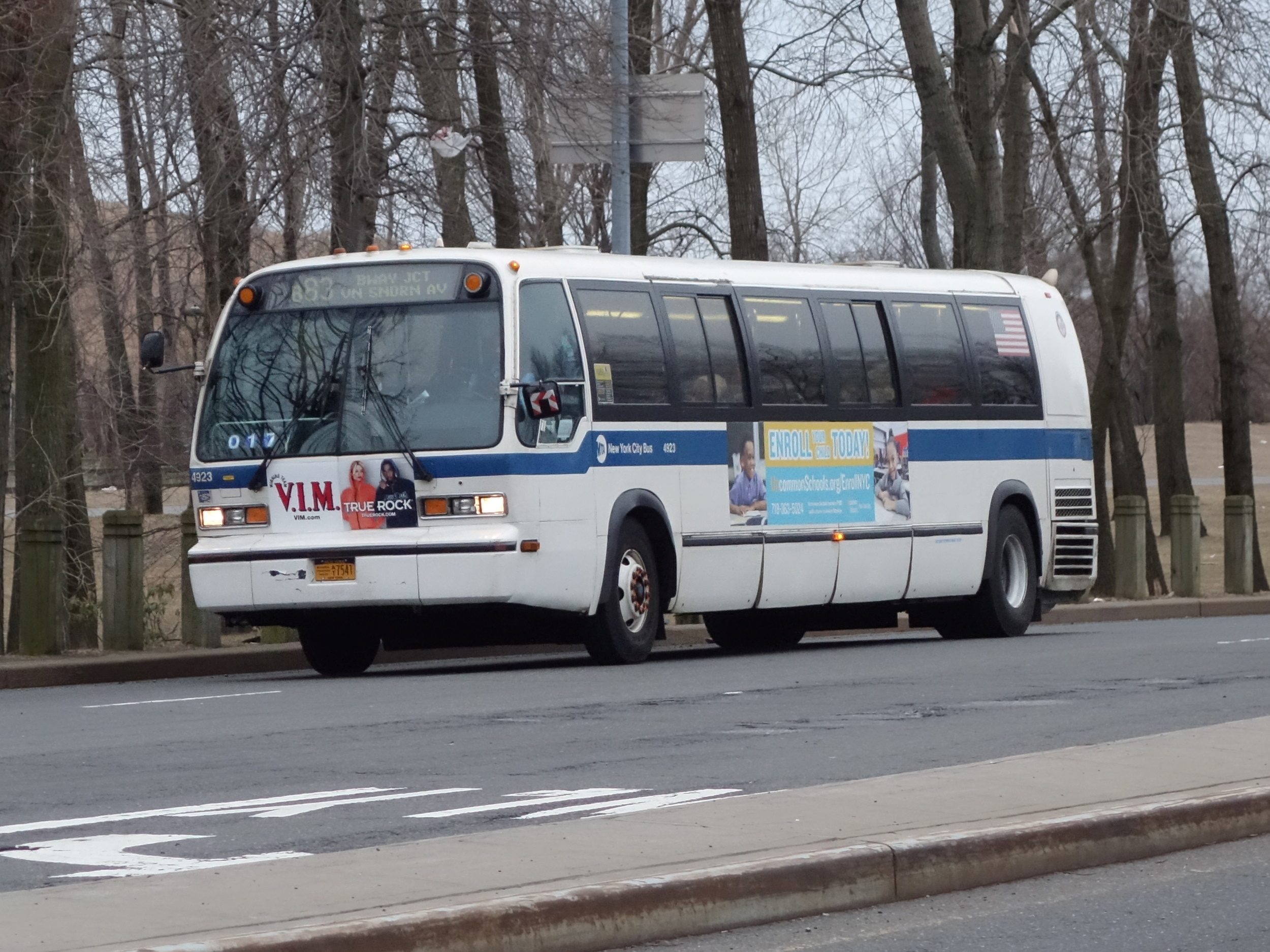
A 1999 Nova Bus RTS-06 (4923) on the Broadway Junction-bound B83 at Gateway Drive/Erskine Street in February 2019

The B83 began as a new route on February 27, 1966, on a six-month trial basis. At the time of its inception, its northern terminus was Livonia Avenue and Pennsylvania Avenue, while the original southern terminus was Cozine Avenue and Schenck Avenue. On November 13, 1966, the route was extended five blocks from Schenck Avenue and Cozine Avenue to Ashford Street and Cozine Avenue to serve the Boulevard Houses development. It was extended north to Broadway Junction at an unknown date and in 1978, it was rerouted from Pennsylvania Avenue to run along Van Siclen Avenue and into Spring Creek Towers. It was then extended to Gateway Mall via Pennsylvania Avenue and the Belt Parkway on November 18, 2007. On August 31, 2014, it was extended even further to the new bus terminal at Gateway Center North.

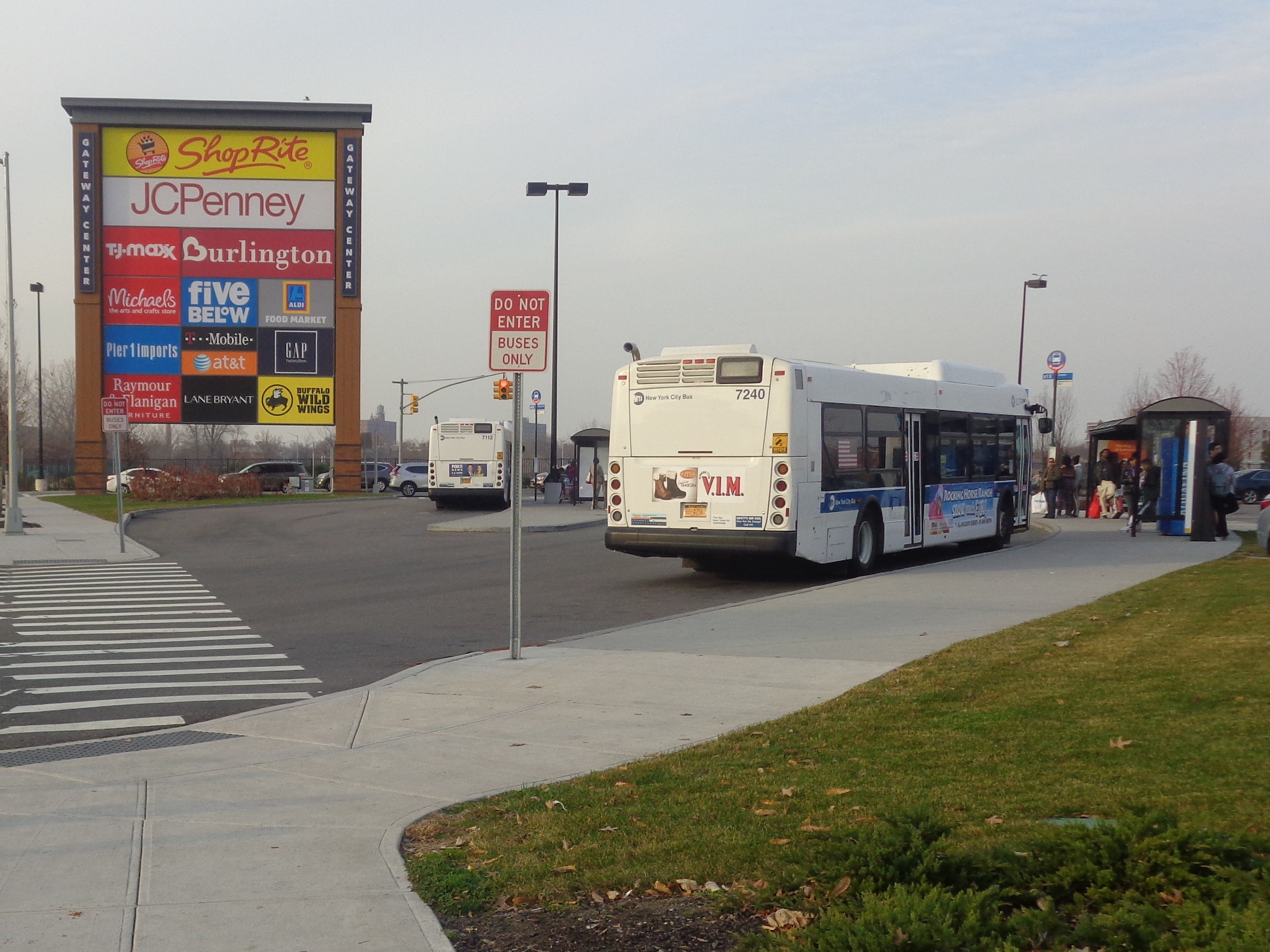
Two 2015 XD40s at Gateway Center North: 7112 to become a B83 to Broadway Junction, and 7240 to become a B13 to Wyckoff Hospital

On December 1, 2022, the MTA released their draft plan for the Brooklyn Bus Redesign. As part of the plan, B20 service north of Broadway Junction would be discontinued, with service on Broadway and service north of Broadway replaced by the B53 and B7 local bus routes, respectively. It would also be rerouted from Wortman Avenue to Stanley Avenue and become a "Rush" route, making limited stops on Pennsylvania Avenue. The B83 would become a "Local" route and run straight down Pennsylvania Avenue to Belt Parkway instead of deviating to Van Siclen Avenue. It would become the local service along Pennsylvania Avenue and have increased frequency to compensate for the loss of B20 local service along the corridor and would gain overnight service, which will terminate at Spring Creek Towers. Closely spaced stops along both routes would be eliminated.

Until 2024, the B83 school trippers running from Spring Creek Community School to Broadway Junction were based out of the Flatbush Depot.
