= East Brooklyn Congregations =

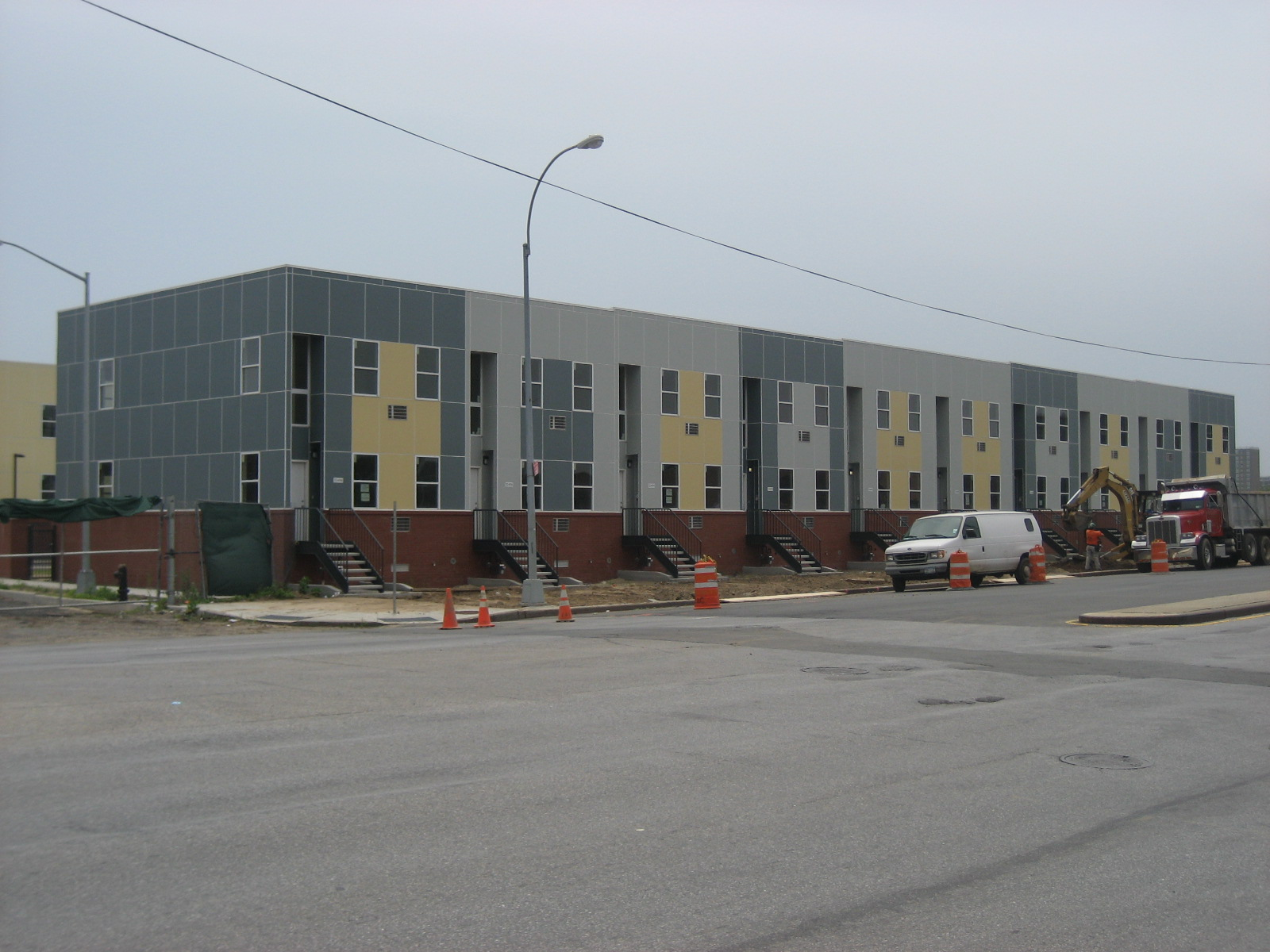
Nehmiah homes

East Brooklyn Congregations (often abbreviated EBC) is a congregation-based community organizing serving several neighborhoods in New York City. Formed in 1980, it is affiliated with the Industrial Areas Foundation and headed by Michael Gecan. EBC is best known for founding Nehemiah Homes, which has constructed several affordable housing developments since the late 1980s in the Eastern Brooklyn neighborhoods of Flatbush, East New York, and Spring Creek. It has been involved in the formation of three public New York City high schools: EBC East New York, EBC Bushwick High School for Public Service, and Bushwick Leaders' High School for Academic Excellence.
