= East New York =

Neighborhood of Brooklyn in New York City

- Neighborhood of Brooklyn
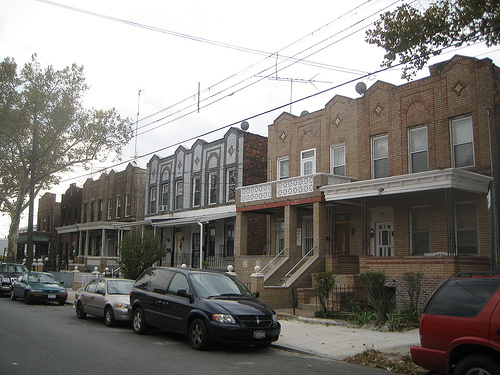
- Typical multi-unit semi-detached rowhouses in East New York
- Location in New York City
- Coordinates: 40.67°N 73.89°W
- Country: United States
- State: New York
- City: New York City
- Borough: Brooklyn
- Community District: Brooklyn 5

Area
  - Total: 1.867 sq mi (4.84 km^{2})

Population (2010)
  - Total: 91,958
  - Density: 49,250/sq mi (19,020/km^{2})

Ethnicity
  - Black: 63.6%
  - Hispanic: 29.6
  - Asian: 3.0
  - White: 1.3
  - Other: 2.5

Economics
  - Median income: $36,786
- Time zone: UTC−5 (Eastern)
  - Summer (DST): UTC−4 (EDT)
- ZIP Codes: 11207, 11208, 11239
- Area codes: 718, 347, 929, and 917

East New York is a residential neighborhood in the eastern section of the New York City borough of Brooklyn. Its boundaries, starting from the north and moving clockwise, are roughly the Cemetery Belt and the Queens borough line to the north; the Queens borough line to the east; Jamaica Bay to the south; the New York City Subway's BMT Canarsie Line, the Bay Ridge Branch railroad tracks, and Van Sinderen Avenue to the west. Linden Boulevard, Pennsylvania Avenue, and Atlantic Avenue are the primary thoroughfares through East New York.

East New York was founded as the Town of New Lots in the 1650s. It was annexed as the 26th Ward of the rapidly growing City of Brooklyn in 1886, and became part of New York City in 1898. During the latter part of the twentieth century, East New York came to be predominantly inhabited by African Americans and Hispanics.

East New York is part of Brooklyn Community District 5, and its primary ZIP Codes are 11207, 11208, and 11239. It is patrolled by the 75th Precinct of the New York City Police Department. New York City Housing Authority (NYCHA) property in the area is patrolled by P.S.A. 2. Coverage by the Fire Department of New York is provided by Battalions 39 & 44. Politically it is represented by the New York City Council's 37th and 42nd Districts.

== History ==
=== Early history and development ===
At the northern edge of what is now East New York, a chain of hills—also known as a terminal moraine—separates northwestern Long Island from Jamaica and the Hempstead Plains, the main part of Long Island's fertile outwash plain. The southern portions of the neighborhood, meanwhile, consisted of salt marshes and several creeks, which drained into Jamaica Bay. These areas were originally settled by the Jameco Native Americans, and later used by the Canarsee and Rockaway tribes as fishing grounds.

In the 1650s Dutch colonists began settling in what are now the eastern sections of Brooklyn, forming the towns of Flatbush, Bushwick, and New Lots (the predecessor of East New York). The area along with the rest of Brooklyn and modern New York City was ceded to the British Empire in 1664. A few 18th-century roads, including the ferry road or Palmer Turnpike from Brooklyn to Jamaica, passed through the chain of hills; hence the area was called "Jamaica Pass". During the American Revolutionary War, invading British and Hessian (German) soldiers ended an all-night forced march at this pass in August 1776 to surprise and flank General George Washington and the Continental Army, to win the Battle of Long Island (also known as the Battle of Brooklyn or the Battle of Brooklyn Heights).

In 1835, Connecticut merchant John Pitkin (the namesake of Pitkin Avenue) purchased the land of the Town of New Lots north of New Lots Avenue, opening a shoe factory at what is now Williams Street and Pitkin Avenue. Pitkin named the area "East New York" to promote it as a metropolitan rival to New York City, or to mark it as the eastern gateway to the New York region. In 1836 the Brooklyn and Jamaica Railroad (soon to become part of the Long Island Rail Road, or LIRR) opened through the area; it did not originally stop in East New York, but a stop there was added by 1844. The LIRR moved its terminus to Queens in 1860, and the line through Brooklyn was shortened to end at East New York.

In 1852, New Lots was officially ceded from the Town of Flatbush. In the middle 19th century, the road between Brooklyn and Jamaica became the Brooklyn and Jamaica Plank Road. The Brooklyn and Rockaway Beach Railroad (1865) was built to connect the LIRR's Atlantic Branch with Canarsie at a point later known as Broadway Junction. As often happened at 19th-century railroad junctions, a railway town arose. Sprawling development into the recently rustic northern part of the Town of New Lots followed the reach of elevated transit lines into the area: the Jamaica Avenue Line in 1885 and the Fulton Street Line in 1889. The road to Brooklyn was renamed Fulton Street, the one to Jamaica, Jamaica Avenue, and the one to Williamsburg, Broadway.

=== Annexation to Brooklyn and 20th century ===
East New York (as the Town of New Lots) was annexed as the 26th Ward of the rapidly growing City of Brooklyn in 1886; in 1898 after a decade-long controversy with debates, campaigns and publicity, the community was merged into New York City as a whole with the consolidation of Brooklyn and the other four boroughs into a single entity as the "City of Greater New York". In the 20th century its name came to be applied to much of the former township.

In 1939, the Works Progress Administration Guide to New York City wrote:

The development of East New York began in 1835 through the enterprise of John R. Pitkin, a wealthy Connecticut merchant who visualized it as a great city rivaling New York. The Panic of 1837 smashed his hopes. After 1853, a modest development began. By the 1930s, the residents were chiefly Italians, Jews, Germans, and Russians who moved in from Brownsville, Bushwick, and other near-by crowded localities. Many of the Slavic families continue to burn candles before icons, and observe religious fetes according to the old calendar...

After World War II, thousands of manufacturing jobs left New York City thereby increasing the importance of the remaining jobs to those with limited education and job skills. During this same period, large numbers of Puerto Ricans from the Caribbean island and African-Americans from the South emigrated to New York City looking for employment. East New York, no longer replete with the jobs the new residents had come for, was thereby faced with a host of new socioeconomic problems, including widespread unemployment and crime.

=== Economic downturn ===
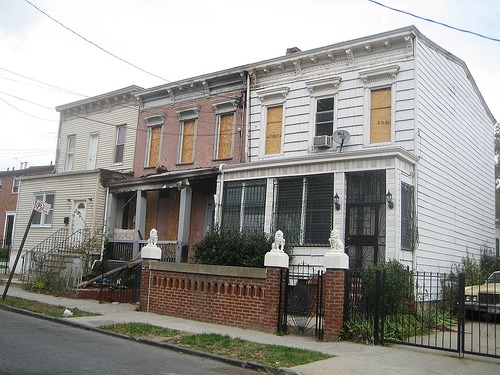
Abandoned houses in East New York, 2008

Walter Thabit, a city planner for East New York, chronicled in his 2003 book, How East New York Became a Ghetto, the change in population from mostly working class Italians and Jewish residents to residents of Puerto Rican and African American descent. Thabit argues that landlords and real estate agents played a significant role in the downturn of the area. Puerto Ricans were moving to New York City in the late 1950s, at a time when unemployment rates in Puerto Rico soared to 25 percent, and left Puerto Rico on the brink of poverty. By 1966, Blacks and Puerto Ricans were the majority of the neighborhood with around 48,000 Black residents, 30,000 Puerto Rican residents, and 22,000 remaining White residents (who were mostly Italian and Jewish residents); however, a majority of the White residents would eventually vacate out of the neighborhood due to increasing crime in the later decades. Poverty became very highly concentrated, with the neighborhood's population largely being on welfare benefits by the 1960s. The neighborhood also began to suffer from numerous arson incidents and building fires, and buildings, previously occupied by Italian and Jewish residents, were increasingly abandoned as a result of increasing crime rates and racial tensions between White and non-White residents. During the 1960s, there were reported cases of Italian youths and Black and Puerto Rican youths getting into racially motivated fights. Thabit also describes how the construction of public housing projects in East New York further contributed to its decline, noting that many of the developments were built by corrupt managers and contractors. He argues that the city government largely ignored the community when it could have helped turn it around. On the other hand, writing in the New York Press, Michael Manville accused Thabit of poor research, sweeping generalizations, and a failure to distinguish the actions of allegedly racist individuals from the effects of what he describes as "a racist capitalist system", and contends that much of the urban renewal and public housing efforts of the period were in fact well-intentioned, if ill-considered and hubristic.

Since the late 1950s, East New York has had some of the highest crime rates in Brooklyn, and is considered by some to be the borough's murder capital, alongside Brownsville. Many social struggles associated with poverty—including crime and drug addiction—have been prevalent in the area for decades. Despite the decline of crime compared to their peaks during the crack and heroin epidemics, violent crime continues to be widespread in the community. East New York's 75th Police Precinct reported the highest murder rate in the city in 2011, according to crime reports compiled by DNAinfo.com. East New York has significantly higher dropout rates and incidences of violence in its schools. Students must pass through metal detectors and swipe ID cards to enter the buildings. Other problems in local schools include low test scores and high truancy rates. Redlining and Blockbusting by real estate developers also played a large role in the declination on the quality of life in the neighborhood as well as accelerating White flight.

=== Urban renewal and early signs of gentrification ===
In the 1980s East Brooklyn Congregations (EBC), an affiliate of the Industrial Areas Foundation (IAF) organized to address the need for quality affordable housing in East New York. This coalition advocated that vacant New York City owned land be provided at no cost for the development of new affordable owner occupied housing with subsidies for low-interest mortgages. This effort was called the Nehemiah Program. It was replicated in other parts of the city and country and led to national legislation. The Nehemiah homes were funded by a loan from $8 million loan fund from three Brooklyn Churches. Its setup was described as follows by The New York Times the city provides vacant sites, forgives real-estate taxes on the homes (but not the land) for 10 years, and provides what amounts to a $10,000 interest-free loan per house. Buyers pay $43,500 (their median income was $27,000; 40 percent moved from public or subsidized housing)."

New developments are rising in the area, including the Gateway Center shopping mall located on what was once part of a landfill near Jamaica Bay. Gateway Center, in Spring Creek, is a suburban-style shopping complex with multiple large stores. Gateway Center consists of two structures. Gateway Center South, the first structure, opened in 2002, and Gateway Center North, the second development, opened in 2014.

Although East New York has not experienced the same level of gentrification as many other Brooklyn neighborhoods, since the 2010s it has been moving into the pre gentrification stages as real estate companies have been trying to buy up properties and raise property value prices. With the neighborhood rezoned in 2016 under Bill de Blasio's administration, luxury housing developments have been introduced into the area. Real estate agencies have sometimes persuaded homeowners to sell the properties to them, and often they would resell them to other companies for a higher price. Local residents, who are overwhelmingly Black and Latino, have accused these real estate companies of being racist and trying to gentrify them out of the neighborhood to bring wealthier, white residents.

== Architecture ==
This table includes notable sites in East New York neighborhoods, including those designated New York City Landmarks (NYC LPC), listed on the National Register of Historic Places (NRHP) or other heritage register, or are otherwise significant for their history, association with significant events or people, or their architecture and design.

| Name | NYC LPC Number | LPC Designation Date | NRHP Number | NRHP Designation Date | Architect | Style | Notes | Locality |
|---|---|---|---|---|---|---|---|---|
| Cornerstone Seventh-Day Adventist Church | Not listed | | | | Frank Richards | Neo-Classical | Built 1922 | 40.674595701545826, -73.89707903927875 |
| Dutch Reformed Church Schoolhouse and Cemetery Site (Modern Name: Sankofa Park African Burial Ground Commemorative Landscape) | Not listed | | | | Unknown | | Former Enslaved and Freed Black People Burial site in former Dutch Reformed Church Cemetery; Later Dutch Schoolhouse site | 40.665824566900646, -73.88634155225516 |
| East New York Savings Bank Building | Not listed | | | | Richard Upjohn, Jr. | Renaissance Revival | East New York Location; first branch location; Demolished | 40.675505309228676, -73.89652373791306 |
| Empire State Dairy Company Buildings (later Borden Dairy Corporation) | LP-2575 | December 5, 2017 | | | Theobold Engelhardt; Otto Strack | Abstracted Classicist with Secession detail | Built 1906 - 1907; 1914 - 1915 Part of the complex is Abstracted Classicist with Secession detail, a unique style for Brooklyn | 40.67634093894607, -73.88904818228409 |
| Engine Company 236 | Not listed | | | | | Romanesque Revival | Built 1895 | 40.67786271040649, -73.87276236441772 |
| Former 75th Police Precinct Station House | Not listed | | 07000952 | September 10, 2007 | Emile M. Gruwe | Romanesque Revival style with Venetian Revival and Norman Revival ornament | Built c. 1886 - 1892; Modern use: Tismallah Center; affectionately known to the local community as "The Castle" | 40.675126758018266, -73.89194523039563 |
| Former Brooklyn Post Office | Not listed | | | | | | Built c. 1920 | 40.67626119697464, -73.87502553890796 |
| Former Magistrate’s Court | Not listed | | | | Mortimer Dickerson Metcalf | Neo-Classical | Built 1929 | 40.67480443710857, -73.89609773214202 |
| Glenmore Avenue Presbyterian Church | Not listed | | | | | Shingle Style | Built 1899 | 40.67655515164306, -73.87310543406873 |
| Grace Baptist Church of Christ | Not listed | | | | | Gothic Revival | Built 1898 | 40.67418088846235, -73.89514694462378 |
| Holy Trinity Russian Orthodox Church | Not listed | | | | Roman Meltzer | Russian Orthodox | Built 1935 | 40.67367738296382, -73.8957845798534 |
| Mrs. Maxwell’s Bakery | Not listed | | | | | | Built 1928; Demolished | 40.6759900107712, -73.89454679668512 |
| New Lots Reformed Church and Cemetery | LP-0169 | July 19, 1966 | 83001696 | May 19, 1983 | Unknown | Rural Church, Federal Style and Gothic Revival | Built 1824 | 40.66491970699167, -73.88603312304456 |
| New Lots Town Hall | Not listed | | | | | Greek Revival Italianate | Built 1873 | 40.67735682538723, -73.89308442888765 |
| Piels Brewery | Not listed | | | | | | Built c. 1900 | 40.67454591613499, -73.89779061820855 |
| Prince Hall Masonic Lodge | Not listed | | | | Harde & Short | | Built 1906 - 1907 | 40.67651714201639, -73.89735526973448 |
| Public School 149 The Danny Kaye School | Not listed | | | | Charles B. J. Snyder | | Built 1906 | 40.669720773102235, -73.89295028785898 |
| Second Calvary Baptist Church (former Agudath Achim B’nai Jacob Synagogue) | Not listed | | | | | | Built 1921 | 40.67447890157371, -73.89161103747239 |
| Thomas Jefferson High School | Not listed | | | | Probably Charles B. J. Snyder, New York City Board of Education | | Built 1922 - 1924 | 40.6670374436605, -73.89536807868295 |
| Vienna Flats | Not listed | | | | William Danmar | | Built 1885 - 1890 | 40.6774751075733, -73.88793899807264 |

== Demographics ==
Based on data from the 2010 United States census, the population of East New York was 91,958, an increase of 8,683 (10.4%) from the 83,275 counted in the 2000 census. Covering an area of 2,665.73 acres (1,078.78 ha), the neighborhood had a population density of 34.5 inhabitants per acre (22,100/sq mi; 8,500/km^{2}).

The racial makeup of the neighborhood was 63.6% (58,453) African American, 3.0% (2,764) Asian, 1.3% (1,240) White, 0.3% (291) Native American, 0.0% (38) Pacific Islander, 0.7% (683) from other races, and 1.3% (1,237) from two or more races. Hispanic or Latino of any race were 29.6% (27,252) of the population.

The entirety of Community Board 5 had 181,300 inhabitants as of NYC Health's 2018 Community Health Profile, with an average life expectancy of 78.6 years. This is lower than the median life expectancy of 81.2 for all New York City neighborhoods. Most inhabitants are middle-aged adults and youth: 27% are between the ages of 0 and 17, 28% between 25 and 44, and 34% between 45 and 64. The ratio of college-aged and elderly residents was lower, at 10% and 12% respectively.

As of 2016, the median household income in Community Board 5 was $36,786. In 2018, an estimated 30% of East New York residents lived in poverty, compared to 21% in all of Brooklyn and 20% in all of New York City. One in ten residents (10%) were unemployed, compared to 9% in the rest of both Brooklyn and New York City. Rent burden, or the percentage of residents who have difficulty paying their rent, is 52% in East New York, higher than the citywide and boroughwide rates of 52% and 51% respectively. Based on this calculation, as of 2018, East New York is considered to be low-income relative to the rest of the city and not gentrifying.

During the 1960s, East New York transitioned from being predominately Jewish and Italian to being predominately African American and Puerto Rican. However, now East New York is more diversified, with large African American, Puerto Rican, Dominican, West Indian, and South Asian populations. According to the 2020 census data from New York City Department of City Planning, Black residents make up the majority of East New York, but there are also significant populations of Hispanic residents. In East New York North, there are between 20,000 and 29,999 Black residents and between 10,000 and 19,999 Hispanic residents. City Line has about an equal population of Black and Hispanic residents (10,000 to 19,999) and 5,000 to 9,999 Asian residents. East New York New Lots has 30,000 to 39,999 Black residents and 10,000 to 19,999 Hispanic residents. Cypress Hills is the only section of East New York that has a majority Hispanic community, with 20,000 to 29,999 Hispanic residents and 5,000 to 9,999 Black residents. In all parts of East New York except for City Line, there were less than 5,000 white and Asian residents.

== Geography ==
East New York covers a relatively large area, abutting the Queens border to the north and east. North of East New York is Highland Park, the Cemetery Belt, and the neighborhoods of Ridgewood and Glendale in Queens. The neighborhoods of Bushwick and Bedford–Stuyvesant are northwest of East New York, while Brownsville is to the west and Canarsie is to the southwest. Jamaica Bay and the Shirley Chisholm State Park are located on the southern shore, while Woodhaven, Ozone Park, and Howard Beach in Queens are located to the east.

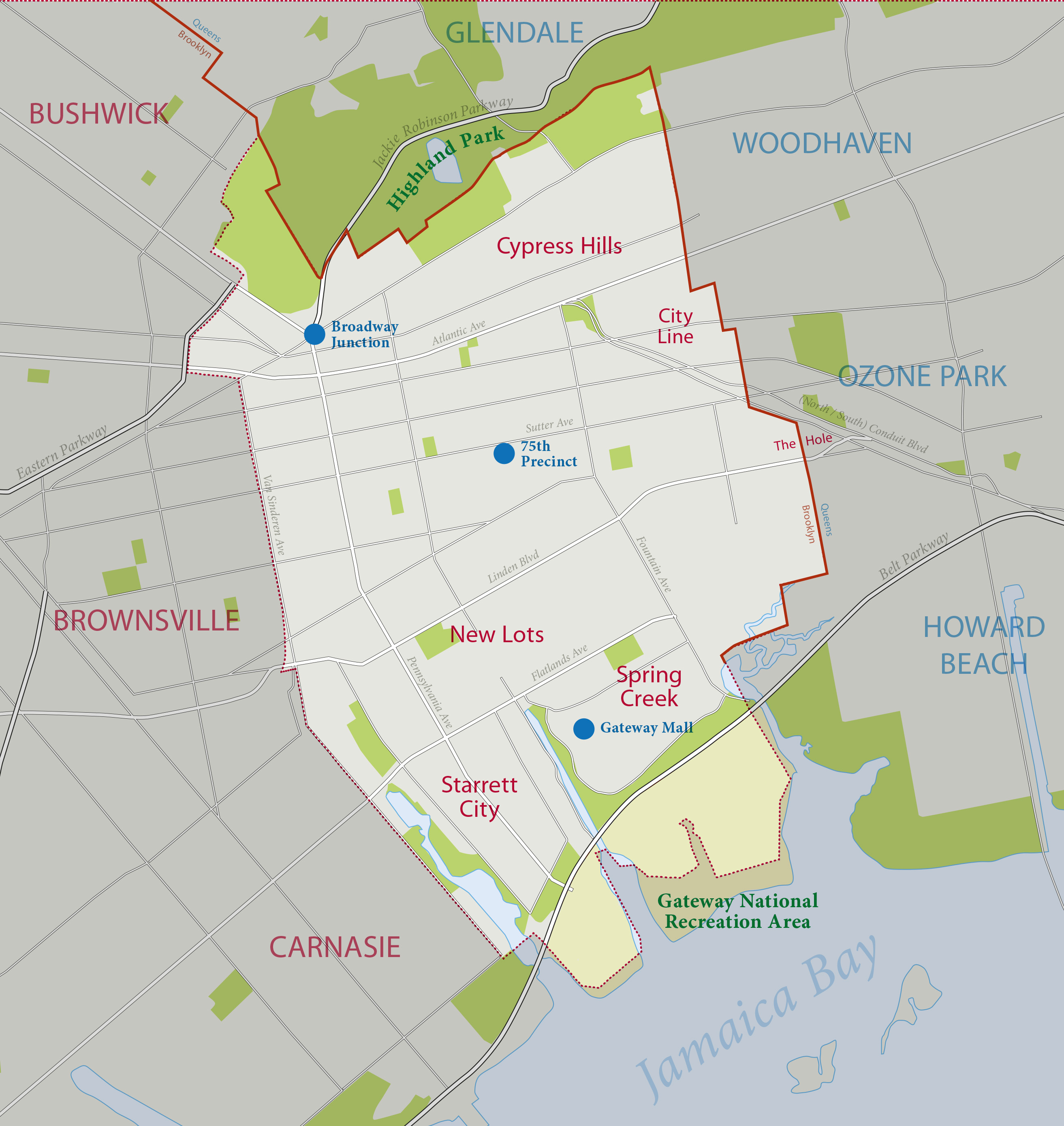
Boundaries of East New York

=== Land use ===
East New York consists of mixed properties but primarily semi-detached homes, two-to-four family houses, and multi-unit apartment buildings, including condominiums and co-ops. The total land area is one square mile.

The area is also home to the East Brooklyn Industrial Park. The 44-block industrial park was established in 1980 by the New York City Public Development Corporation in East New York's northwest quadrant. It is bounded by Atlantic Avenue, Sheffield Avenue, Sutter Avenue and Powell Street.

==== NYCHA Public Housing Developments ====
Public housing developments of various type and a smaller number of tenements populate the area. There are eleven New York City Housing Authority developments located in East New York.

- Cypress Hills Houses; fifteen 7-story buildings.
- East New York City Line; thirty-three 3-story buildings.
- Long Island Baptist Houses; four, 6-story rehabilitated tenement buildings.
- Louis Heaton Pink Houses; twenty-two 8-story buildings.
- Unity Plaza (Sites 4, 5A, 6, 7, 11, 12, 27); five 6-story buildings.
- Unity Plaza (Sites 17, 24, 25A); three buildings 6 stories tall.
- Vandalia Avenue; two 10-story buildings.
- NYCHA Converted RAD PACT Section 8 Developments Since December 28, 2021
  - Boulevard Houses was the first of 11 developments to be built in the area. Built in 1950, it includes eighteen buildings, 6 and 14 stories tall.
  - Belmont-Sutter Area; 3 Buildings With A Total Of 72 Apartment Units
  - Fiorentino Plaza; eight 4-story buildings.
  - Linden Houses; nineteen buildings, 8 and 14 stories.
  - Pennsylvania Avenue-Wortman Avenue; three buildings, 8 and 16 stories tall.

===== NYCHA Converted Section 8 RAD Developments =====
Starting in 2016, New York City Housing Authority began to convert some of their developments into the RAD PACT Section 8 Management with public–private partnership leases with private real estate developers and companies to help manage the properties as well as to get the capital needs and funding to make the necessary repairs and to maintain them properly. Several of the public housing developments in East New York have been switched to this program as of December 28, 2021 along with providing social service providers on their sites to cater to the needs of their local residents, which is nearly half of the East New York NYCHA developments being converted to this program.

NYCHA signed public–private partnership leases with The Hudson Companies, Inc.; Property Resources Corporation; Duvernay + Brooks LLC; Property Resources Corporation; and Lisa Management, Inc. to manage Belmont-Sutter Area Houses, Boulevard Houses, and Fiorentino Plaza Houses with a contracted social services provider called CAMBA, Inc. on their sites and as well as with Douglaston Development; L+M Development Partners; Dantes Partners; SMJ Development Corp; Clinton Management; and C&C Apartment Management LLC to manage Linden Houses and Pennsylvania Avenue-Wortman Avenue Houses with a contracted social services provider called University Settlement on their sites.

=== East New York Farms ===
With the founding of East New York Farms in 1998, there has been an increased usage in lots. Various organizations and local community groups have different gardens in order to beautify the area.

=== African Burial Ground Square ===
African Burial Ground Square was designated in 2013 after remains were found some years earlier between New Lots and Livonia Avenues from Barbey to Schenck Streets. It shares space with the New Lots branch of the Brooklyn Public Library. After months of effort, the burial ground was finally confirmed and formally recognized.

=== Subsections ===
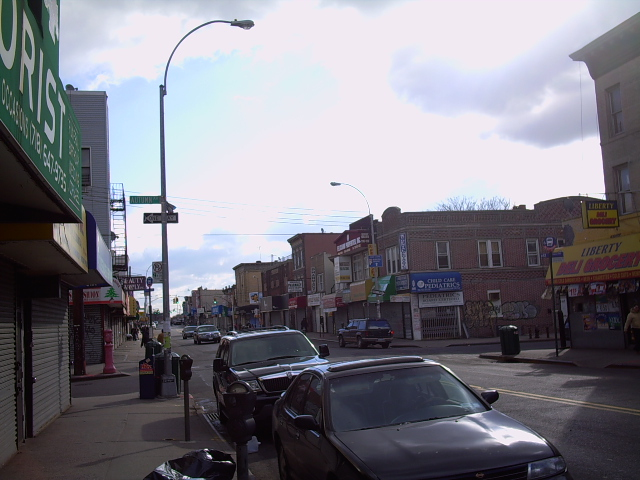
Liberty Avenue in City Line

==== City Line ====
City Line is a sub-section of East New York bordering the neighborhoods of Cypress Hills to the north and southwest and Ozone Park (Queens) to the east. The neighborhood is named "City Line" for its location in the former City of Brooklyn near the border with Queens County before Brooklyn and parts of Queens County were consolidated into New York City in 1898. Many Italians, Germans and Irish originally lived in the area, which today is home to immigrants from Bangladesh, the Dominican Republic, and Guyana. The neighborhood also includes African Americans, Hispanics and a scattered presence of South Asians. The main commercial district is located along Liberty Avenue. City Line is home to many restaurants, shopping stores, and food markets.

==== New Lots ====
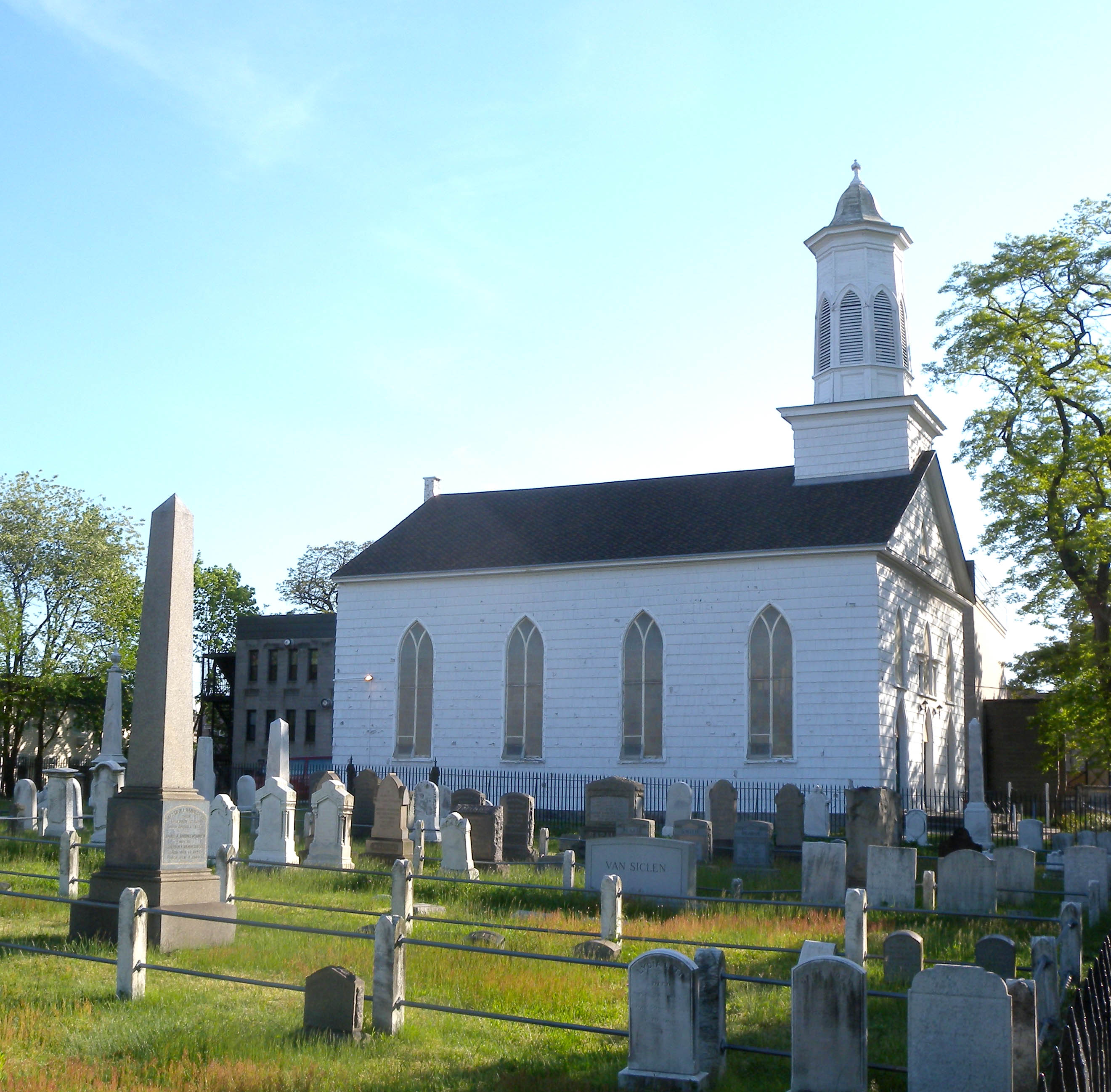
New Lots Community Church

New Lots is a sub-section of East New York. The "New Lots" east of the Town of Flatbush were laid out in the 18th century and were considered to be an eastward extension of Flatbush. The area was the site of the Town Hall of New Lots (located at 109-111 Bradford Street) from 1852 when the area seceded from Flatbush until it was annexed in 1886 as the 26th Ward of Brooklyn. The population is largely African-American and Hispanic-American. IS 218, PS 72 and Invictus Preparatory Charter School are right across from the public houses.

==== Spring Creek ====
Spring Creek is the southeastern part of the former Town of New Lots, and is often included in East New York. Its boundaries moving clockwise are: Linden Boulevard to the north; Betts Creek and Fountain Avenue to the east; Gateway National Recreation Area to the south; and Schenck Avenue and Hendrix Creek to the west. Some locations north of this area up to Linden Boulevard are also considered part of the neighborhood. Spring Creek includes the Starrett City apartment complex, the Gateway Center, the Spring Creek Gardens gated housing development, and the Nehemiah Spring Creek and Gateway Elton affordable housing developments.

==== Cypress Hills ====
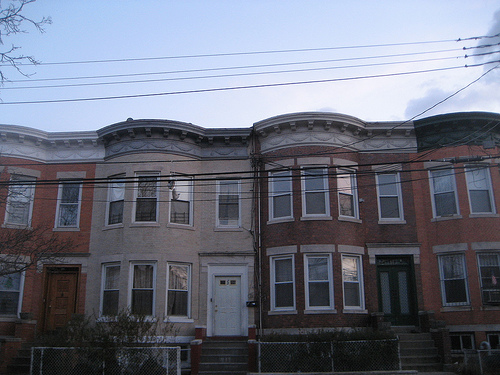
Rowhouses in Cypress Hills

Cypress Hills, a subsection of East New York, is bordered on the south by City Line; to the north by Cypress Hills Cemetery; to the west by Bushwick; and to the east by Woodhaven and Ozone Park in Queens. Cypress Hills is bordered by Highland Park Boulevard and Jamaica Avenue on the north, Eldert Lane on the east, Atlantic Avenue and Conduit Boulevard on the south, and Pennsylvania Ave on the west. The Cypress Hills and Arlington branches of the Brooklyn Public Library serve this community. This neighborhood is demographically mixed with Dominican-Americans, Stateside Puerto Ricans, South Asian-Americans, Caribbean Americans, Caucasians and African Americans. The Hispanic or Latino population were 60.9%.

==== Starrett City ====
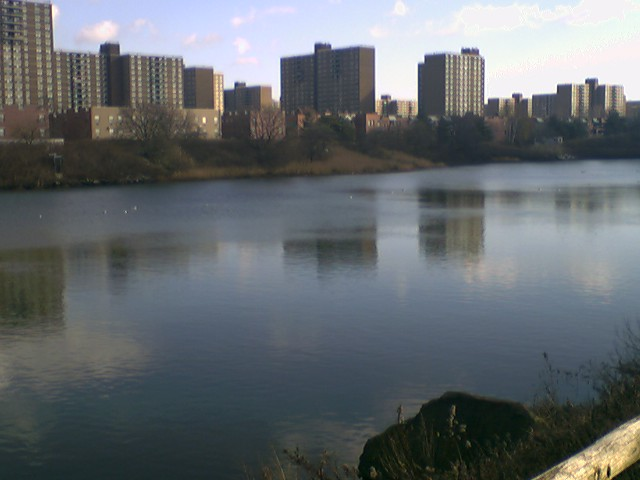
Fresh Creek Basin, with Starrett City in the background

Starrett City (also known as Spring Creek Towers) is the largest subsidized rental apartment complex in the United States. Its boundaries, starting from the north and moving clockwise are: Flatlands Avenue to the north, Hendrix Street to the east, Jamaica Bay to the south and the Fresh Creek Basin. Opened in 1974, the Starrett City site spanned over 153 acres (0.62 km^{2}) before being subdivided in 2009 as part of a refinancing. The housing development contains 5,881 apartment units in 46 buildings. The residential site also includes eight parking garages and a community center. The area contains a shopping center as well. A number of parcels of undeveloped land totaling 13 acres (5.3 ha) were separated out from the residential site as part of the refinancing.

The development was designed by Herman Jessor, organized in the towers in the park layout. The buildings utilize a simple "foursquare" design. The residential portion of the property has eight "sections" each including several buildings, its own field, recreational area (jungle gym, park, handball court, basketball court) and a five-story parking garage for residents in that section. These sections are Ardsley, Bethel, Croton, Delmar, Elmira, Freeport, Geneva, and Hornell; each named after municipalities in New York State. The community had its own newspaper, known as the Spring Creek Sun.

==== The Hole ====
The Hole is an isolated section that is also a part of Queens. A run-down neighborhood considered "lost", it has the lowest elevation within the city and is considered to be like the Wild West in some fashions. It is generally bordered by Ruby Street, South Conduit Avenue, and Linden Boulevard.

The area is home to the Federation of Black Cowboys.

== Police and crime ==
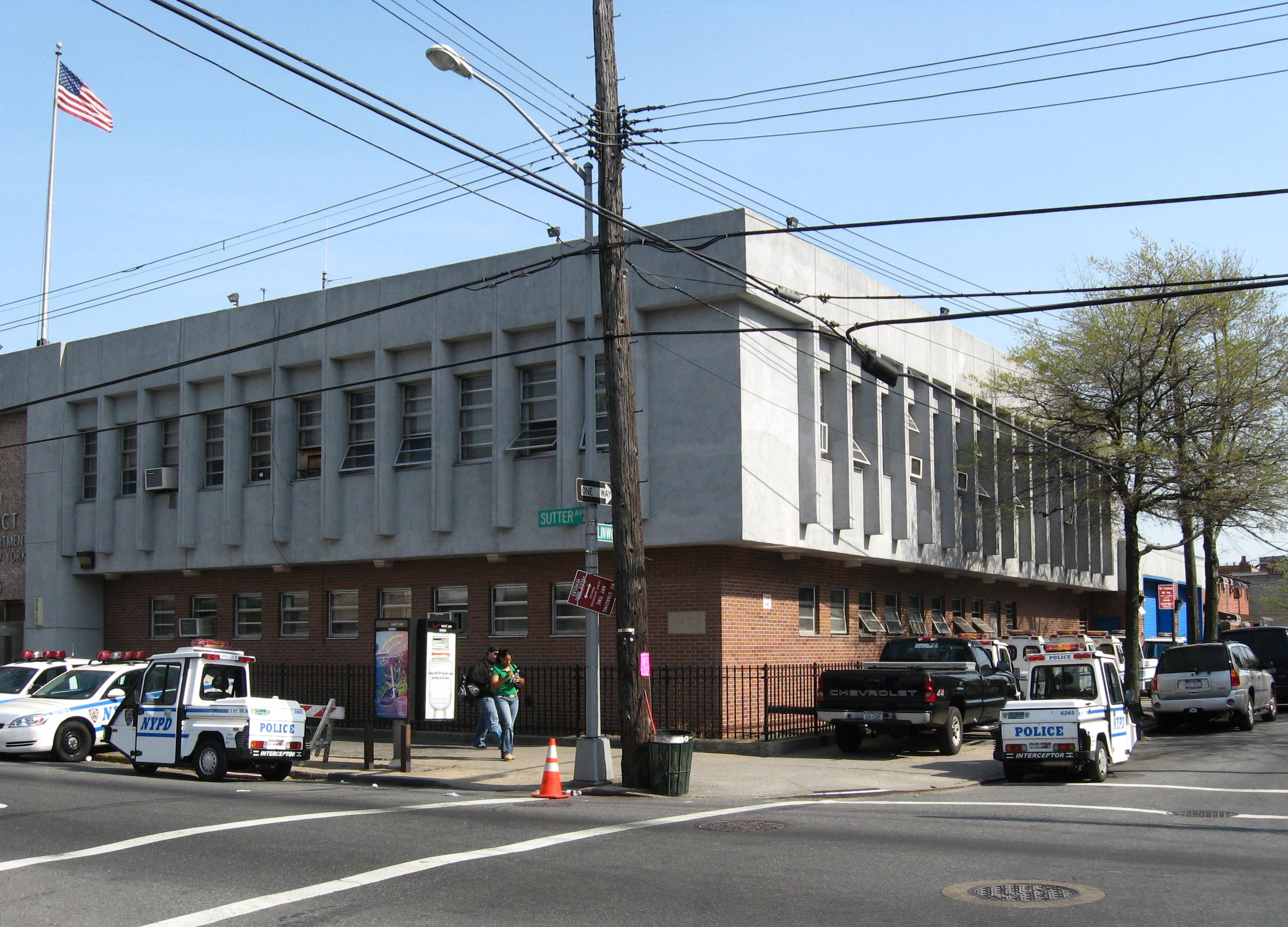
75th Precinct of the NYPD pictured in 2009

East New York is patrolled by the 75th Precinct of the NYPD. While total crime has decreased since the 1990s, it is still higher in East New York than in the rest of the city. In 2023, there were 24 homicides in the 75th Precinct, a rate of 25.8 per 100,000 population, vs. a rate of 4.4 homicides per 100,000 population for the city as a whole.

The precinct reported 24 murders, 762 rapes, 696 robberies, 1,079 felony assaults, 354 burglaries, 1,073 grand larcenies, and 551 grand larcenies auto in 2023.

== Fire safety ==
The New York City Fire Department (FDNY) operates four fire stations and one EMS station in East New York:

- Engine Company 332/Ladder Company 175 – 165 Bradford Street
- Engine Company 290/Ladder Company 103 – 480 Sheffield Avenue
- Engine Company 236 – 998 Liberty Avenue
- Engine Company 225/Ladder Company 107/Battalion 39 – 799 Lincoln Avenue
- EMS Station 39

== Health ==
As of 2018, preterm births and births to teenage mothers are more common in East New York than in other places citywide. In East New York, there were 110 preterm births per 1,000 live births (compared to 87 per 1,000 citywide), and 29.3 births to teenage mothers per 1,000 live births (compared to 19.3 per 1,000 citywide). East New York has a relatively low population of residents who are uninsured, or who receive healthcare through Medicaid. In 2018, this population of uninsured residents was estimated to be 7%, which is lower than the citywide rate of 12%.

The concentration of fine particulate matter, the deadliest type of air pollutant, in East New York is 0.0077 milligrams per cubic metre (7.7×10^{−9} oz/ft^{3}), lower than the citywide and boroughwide averages. Thirteen percent of East New York residents are smokers, which is slightly lower than the city average of 14% of residents being smokers. In East New York, 35% of residents are obese, 14% are diabetic, and 34% have high blood pressure—compared to the citywide averages of 24%, 11%, and 28% respectively. In addition, 25% of children are obese, compared to the citywide average of 20%.

Seventy-six percent of residents eat some fruits and vegetables every day, which is lower than the city's average of 87%. In 2018, 70% of residents described their health as "good", "very good", or "excellent", less than the city's average of 78%. For every supermarket in East New York, there are 13 bodegas.

There are several hospitals in the East New York area, including NYC Health + Hospitals/Gotham Health, East New York; Brookdale University Hospital and Medical Center; and Kings County Hospital Center.

== Post offices and ZIP Codes ==
The majority of East New York is covered by ZIP Codes 11207 and 11208, though Starrett City is covered by its own zip code, 11239. The United States Post Office operates the East New York Station at 2645 Atlantic Avenue, Sutter Avenue Station, 1223 Sutter Avenue, and the Spring Creek Station at 1310 Pennsylvania Avenue.

== Education ==
=== Schools ===
East New York generally has a lower ratio of college-educated residents than the rest of the city as of 2018. While 21% of residents age 25 and older have a college education or higher, 23% have less than a high school education and 56% are high school graduates or have some college education. By contrast, 40% of Brooklynites and 38% of city residents have a college education or higher. The percentage of East New York students excelling in reading and math has been increasing, with reading achievement rising from 26 percent in 2000 to 32 percent in 2011, and math achievement rising from 19 percent to 43 percent within the same time period.

East New York's rate of elementary school student absenteeism is higher than the rest of New York City. In East New York, 31% of elementary school students missed twenty or more days per school year, compared to the citywide average of 20% of students. Additionally, 68% of high school students in East New York graduate on time, lower than the citywide average of 75% of students.

Area schools include:

- Franklin K. Lane High School was at the extreme northeast corner of the neighborhood, north of Jamaica Avenue; it closed in 2011. New schools opened on the campus and they are administered by the New York City Department of Education as H.S. 420. Today the school is the campus site for five different high schools: The Academy of Innovative Technology, The Brooklyn Lab School, Cypress Hill Prep Academy, The Urban Assembly School for Collaborative Healthcare, and Multicultural High School.
- P.S. 108 Sal Abbracciamento School is at 200 Linwood Street (on the corner of Arlington). It is a public elementary school with an enrollment of about 900 students in grades pre-K through 5. Its building dates to 1895 and is listed on the National Register of Historic Places.
- Blessed Sacrament Elementary School is on Euclid Avenue, between Fulton Street and Ridgewood Avenue.
- Saint Fortunata is located on Linden Boulevard and Crescent Street.
- IS 171 is on Ridgewood Avenue between Nichols Avenue and Lincoln Avenue.
- IS 302 is also a public school, on Linwood Street between Atlantic Avenue and Liberty Avenue. The school shut down in 2013 and was replaced with 3 schools, Vista Academy, Liberty Avenue Middle School, and Achievement First Appolo.
- Within IS 302, due to lack of funding, there used to be a public school ranging from grades K (kindergarten) to 8th grade, P.S. 89 (aka Cypress Hills Community School) which has since attained its own school building not far from IS 302 on the corner of Atlantic Avenue and Warwick Street.
- PS 7 sits between Crescent Street and Hemlock Street.
- PS 65 "The Little Red School House" serves 549 students in grades K–5. The school moved to Jamaica Avenue in 2009, so space could be made for a charter school.
- PS 290 sits on the corner of Fulton Street and Schenck Avenue.
- Followers of Jesus School is a private Christian school that sits on Atlantic Avenue, between Shepherd Avenue and Essex Street.

=== Libraries ===
The Brooklyn Public Library (BPL) has four branches in East New York:

- The Arlington branch at 203 Arlington Avenue near Warwick Street, a Carnegie library.
- The Cypress Hills branch at 1197 Sutter Avenue near Crystal Street. It was founded in 1955 and the current building opened in 1995.
- The New Lots branch and New Lots Learning Center at 665 New Lots Avenue near Barbey Street. It was founded in 1942 and became a BPL branch in 1949. MASS Design Group and Marble Fairbanks were hired to redesign the library in 2024.
- The Spring Creek branch at 12143 Flatlands Avenue near New Jersey Avenue, which opened in 1977.

== Transportation ==
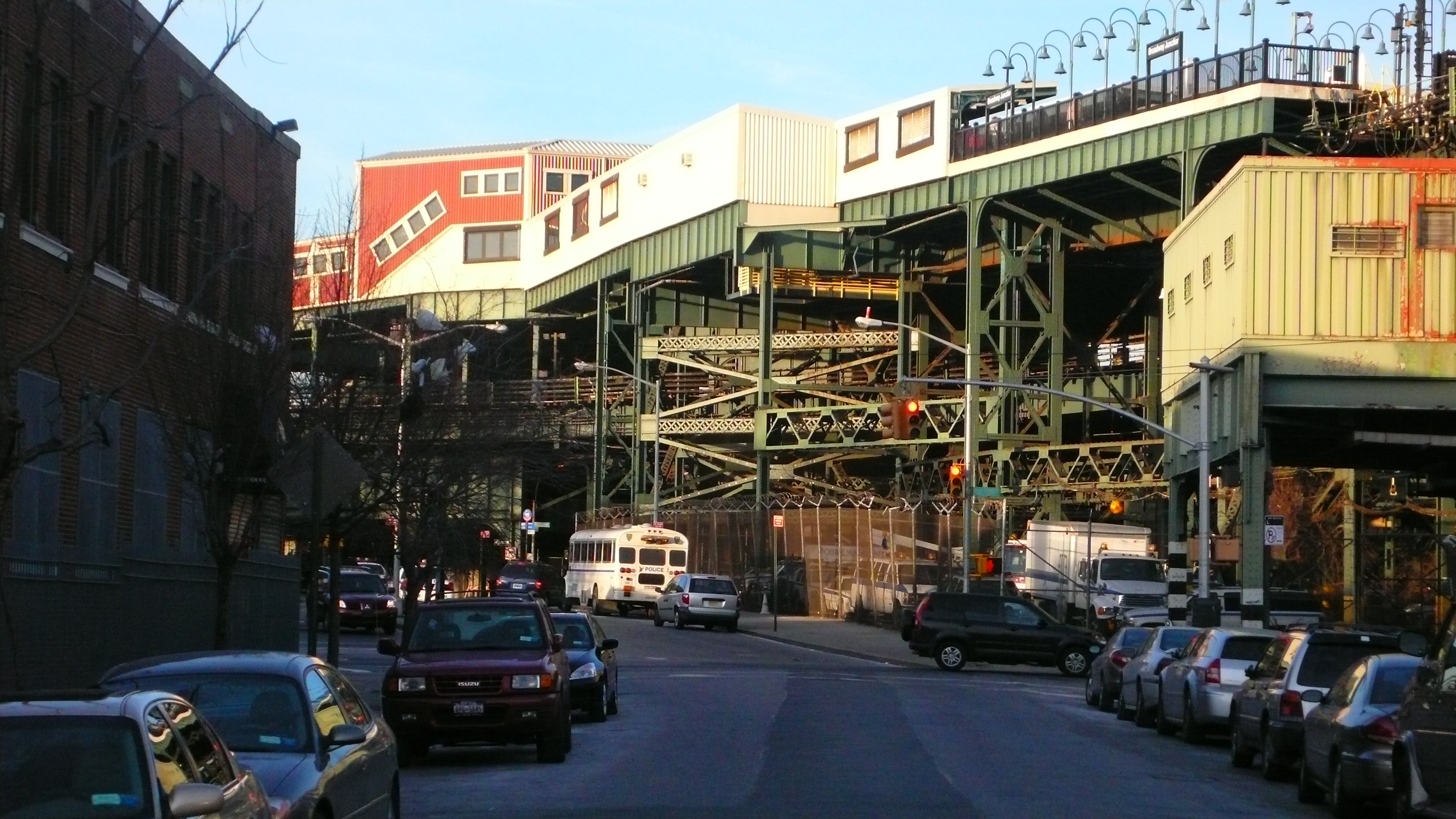
Broadway Junction station

East New York is well-served by public transportation, including these New York City Subway services:

- The 2, 3, 4, and 5 trains at Pennsylvania Avenue, Van Siclen Avenue and New Lots Avenue on the IRT New Lots Line.
- The L train at Broadway Junction, Atlantic Avenue, Sutter Avenue, Livonia Avenue, and New Lots Avenue on the BMT Canarsie Line.
- The A and C trains at Broadway Junction, Liberty Avenue, Van Siclen Avenue, Shepherd Avenue, Euclid Avenue, and Grant Avenue on the IND Fulton Street Line.
- The J and Z trains at Broadway Junction, Alabama Avenue, Van Siclen Avenue, Cleveland Street, Norwood Avenue, Crescent Street, and Cypress Hills on the BMT Jamaica Line.

The following MTA Regional Bus Operations routes serve the neighborhood:

- The BM2 and BM5 express routes
- The B6, B12, B13, B14, B15, B20, B25, B82, B82 SBS, B83, B84, Q7, Q8, Q24, Q56 and Q112 local routes.
- The B60 and B103 buses, despite mainly serving Canarsie, have the same terminal on the border with the neighborhood between Williams and Louisiana Avenues.

In addition, the neighborhood contains the East New York station on the Long Island Rail Road's Atlantic Branch. The New York City Subway's East New York Yard, Livonia Yard, and Pitkin Yard, as well as New York City Bus' East New York Bus Depot and MTA Bus Company’s Spring Creek Bus Depot, are all in the neighborhood, but none of these are open to the public. The freight-only Bay Ridge Branch demarcates the western border of East New York.

Avenues and other major highways and roadways designed for automobiles include:

- Atlantic Avenue
- Pennsylvania Avenue
- Fulton Street
- Linden Blvd (NY-27)
- Fountain Avenue
- Sutter Avenue
- Conduit Avenue
- Flatlands Avenue
- Belt Parkway
- Jackie Robinson Parkway

== In popular culture ==
In October 2022, CBS series debuted a TV drama serial show simply called East New York with storylines about the fictional 74th Police Precinct showing the lives of their NYPD officers patrolling the East New York neighborhood and responding to crime scenes and investigations that take place in the neighborhood.

== Notable residents ==
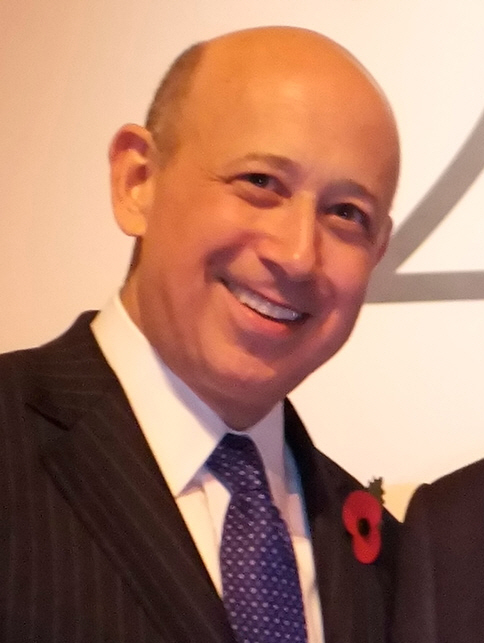
Lloyd Blankfein

- AZ (born 1972), rapper
- Lloyd Blankfein (born 1954), investment banker who served as the CEO and chairman of Goldman Sachs from 2006 to 2018
- Steve Buscemi (born 1957), actor and filmmaker
- Lou Fine (1914–1971), comic book artist
- Sylvia Fine (1913–1991), lyricist, composer, and producer, and the wife of the comedian Danny Kaye.
- Martin Goldstein (c. 1905–1941), member of a gang of hitmen, known as Murder, Inc.
- John Gotti (1940–2002), mob boss
- Henry Hill (1943–2012), mobster
- Danny Kaye (1911–1987), actor, comedian, singer and dancer.
- Joe Kubert (1926–2012), Polish-born American comic book artist, art teacher and founder of The Kubert School
- Jeru the Damaja (born 1972), rapper
- Clara Lemlich (1886–1982), leader of the Uprising of 20,000, and the massive strike of shirtwaist workers in New York's garment industry in 1909.
- Yaakov Litzman (born 1948), Israeli politician and government minister
- Masta Killa (born 1969), rapper
- Uncle Murda (born 1980), rapper
- Nelson Peltz (born 1942), billionaire businessman and investor
- Darren Robinson (1967–1995), founding member of The Fat Boys and pioneer of beatboxing
- Angelo Ruggiero (1940–1989), member of the Gambino crime family
- Binyumen Schaechter (born 1963), composer, arranger, conductor, musical director and performer
- Willa Schneberg (born 1952), poet
- Gary Schwartz (born 1940), art historian
- Allie Sherman (1923–2015), National Football League player and head coach
- Jerry Stiller (1927–2020), comedian and actor
- Country Yossi (born 1949), Orthodox Jewish composer, singer, radio show host, author and magazine publisher
