= Spring Creek, Brooklyn =

Neighborhood in New York City

Spring Creek
- Neighborhood of Brooklyn
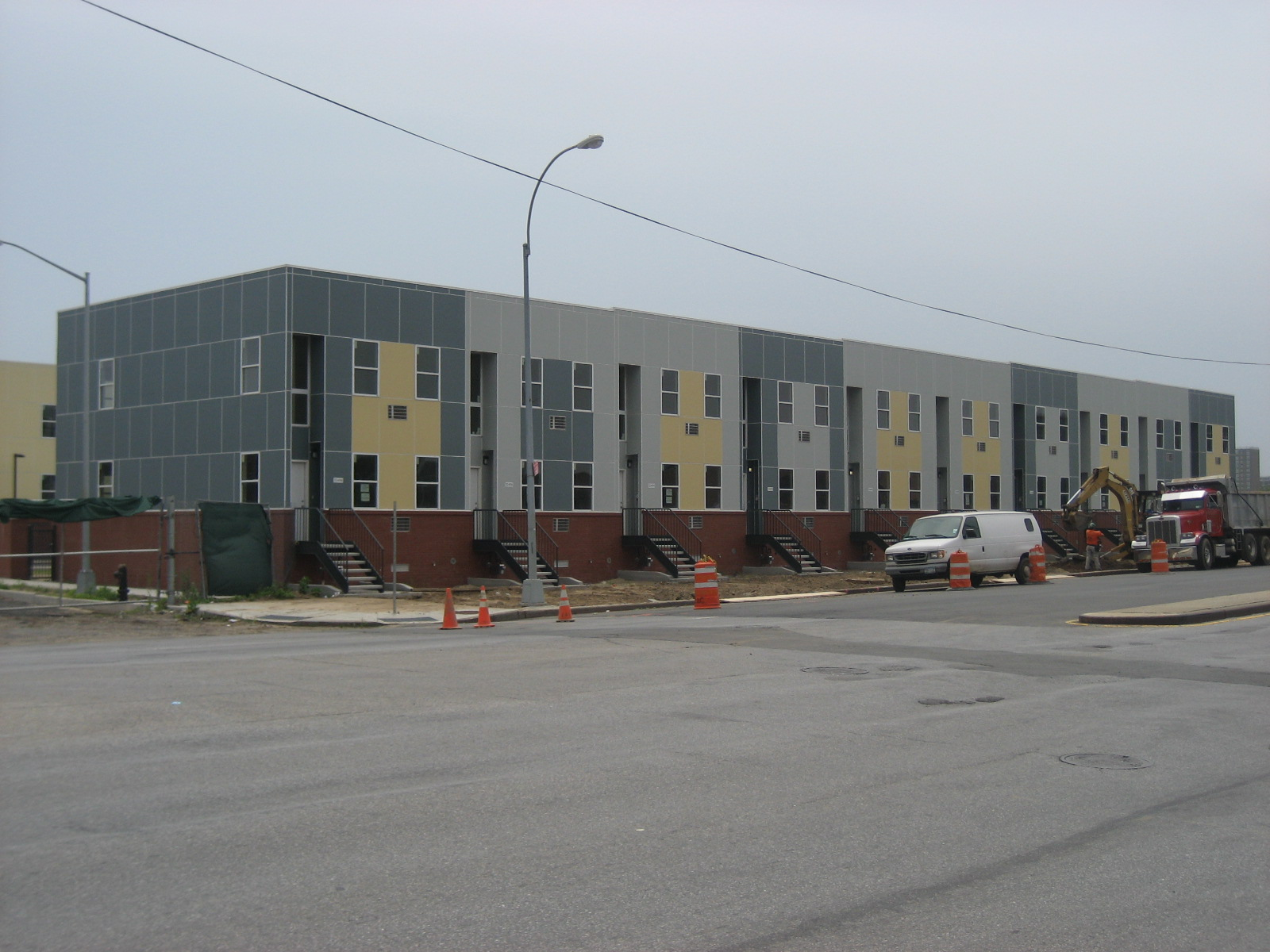
- Houses of the Nehemiah Spring Creek development under construction in 2008.
- Location in New York City
- Coordinates: 40.659°N 73.875°W
- Country: United States
- State: New York
- City: New York City
- Borough: Brooklyn
- Community District: Brooklyn 5
- Designated: 1967
- Time zone: UTC−5 (Eastern)
  - Summer (DST): UTC−4 (EDT)
- ZIP Codes: 11207, 11208, 11239
- Area codes: 718, 347, 929, and 917

Spring Creek, previously called Spring Creek Basin, is a neighborhood within the East New York section of Brooklyn in New York City. It roughly comprises the southern portions of East New York between Flatlands Avenue to the north, and Jamaica Bay and the Gateway National Recreation Area to the south, with the Brooklyn neighborhood of Canarsie to the west and the Queens neighborhood of Howard Beach to the east. It is named after Spring Creek, one of several creeks that formerly ran through the area and drained into Jamaica Bay.

For most of its history, the neighborhood of Spring Creek was considered the place where "the city came to an end", consisting of undeveloped marshland used as illegal dumping grounds, and hosting several large landfills and an incinerator during the 20th century. Much of the area was designated as the Fresh Creek Urban Renewal Area in 1967. The area has since seen several major development and restoration projects, including the Starrett City apartment complex, the Gateway Center shopping complex, several affordable housing communities, and Spring Creek Park. Spring Creek had the largest net gain in population in Brooklyn between 1940 and 2010, an increase of 330%.

Spring Creek is part of Brooklyn Community District 5, and its primary ZIP Codes are 11207, 11208, and 11239.

== Location ==
Spring Creek comprises the southeastern section of East New York, located to the south of New Lots. It is bounded to the north by Flatlands Avenue, to the east by Fountain Avenue (at the former drainage basin of Spring Creek and Betts Creek on the Brooklyn-Queens border), and to the west by Schenck Avenue, Gateway Drive and Hendrix Creek. To the south is the Shore Parkway portion of the Belt Parkway, the Gateway National Recreation Area, and Jamaica Bay. Including Starrett City (which is physically separated by Hendrix Creek), the neighborhood extends west to Louisiana Avenue and Fresh Creek at the boundary with Canarsie. Several areas north to Linden Boulevard, between Fountain Avenue to the west and 78th Street to the east, are also considered part of Spring Creek; this area was formerly known as Plunders Neck. Linden Boulevard was previously considered the northern boundary of Spring Creek.

To the south of the Belt Parkway are the Pennsylvania Avenue and Fountain Avenue Landfills (PAL/FAL). The two landfills were 130-foot (40 m) high man-made peninsulas created from former marshland and open water. The 110-acre (45 ha) Pennsylvania Avenue Landfill opened in 1956 while the 297-acre (120 ha) Fountain Avenue Landfill was opened in 1961 respectively. The Fountain Avenue Landfill (also simply called the Spring Creek Landfill) served as one of five major city facilities for regular refuse during its operation, along with the Fresh Kills and Brookefield Landfills in Staten Island; a facility in Pelham Bay Park in the Bronx; and another one in Edgemere, Queens. The landfills closed around 1985. The two sites have since undergone restoration and are now part of Shirley Chisholm State Park and Spring Creek Park.

Most of Spring Creek and Starrett City fall under the 11239 ZIP Code, but some portions of Spring Creek north of Flatlands Avenue, as well as the Brooklyn Developmental Center, fall under the 11207, and 11208 ZIP Codes.

== History ==
=== Early settlement ===
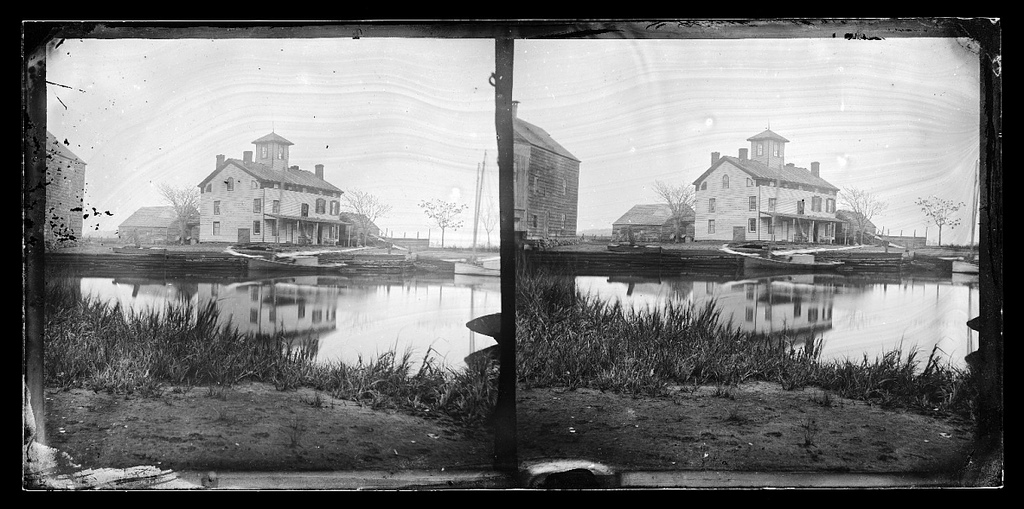
Forbell's Landing, late 19th Century

Prior to European colonization, what is now Spring Creek consisted of salt marshes and several creeks, which drained into Jamaica Bay. The namesake creek itself ran north as far as Atlantic Avenue and Eldert Lane, near Highland Park (at the north end of Brooklyn) and Forest Park, forming the border of Brooklyn and Queens. The northern shores of Jamaica Bay were inhabited by the Jameco, Canarsee, and Rockaway Native American groups (for whom the Jamaica, Canarsie, and Rockaway areas would be named). In the 1650s, Dutch colonists began settling in the eastern sections of Brooklyn, forming the towns of Flatbush and New Lots (the latter the predecessor to East New York). The area, along with the rest of Brooklyn and modern New York City, was ceded to the British Empire in 1664.

The first development in the Spring Creek area took place in the 1890s, a 30-acre (12 ha) farm built by the Cozine family, the likely namesake of Cozine Avenue. This farm included a house and stable at the modern-day intersection of Elton Street and Vandalia Avenue. Plunders Neck, then a peninsula between Betts and Spring Creeks, took its name from pirates who occupied the waters and "plundered." In the late 19th century it hosted a small community of wooden houses housing around 50 families who fished and farmed in the area. A hotel was erected along Mill Pond, near the basin of the creeks, at what was called Forbell's Landing. Otherwise, the area remained uninhabited.

=== Early development ===
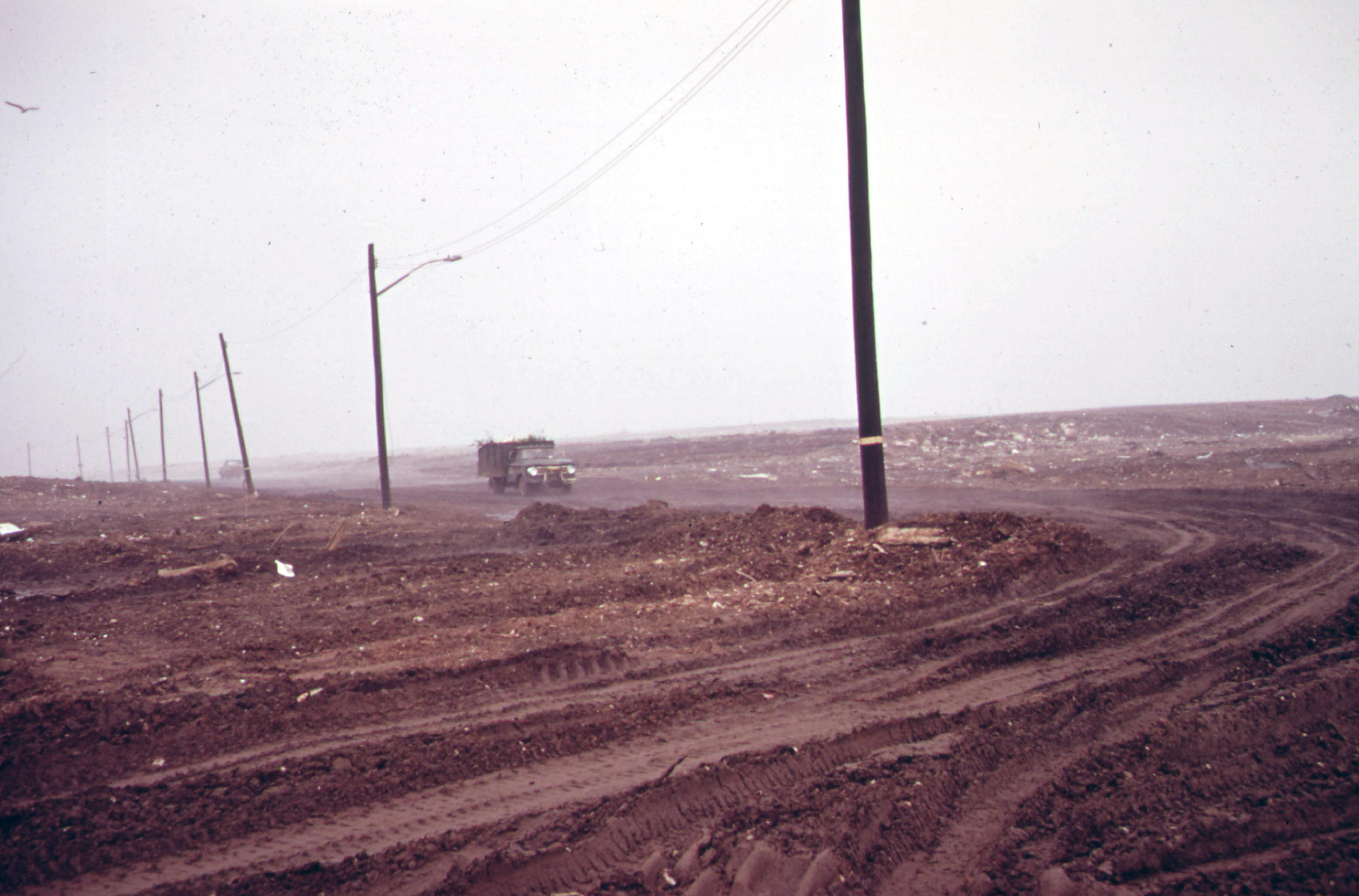
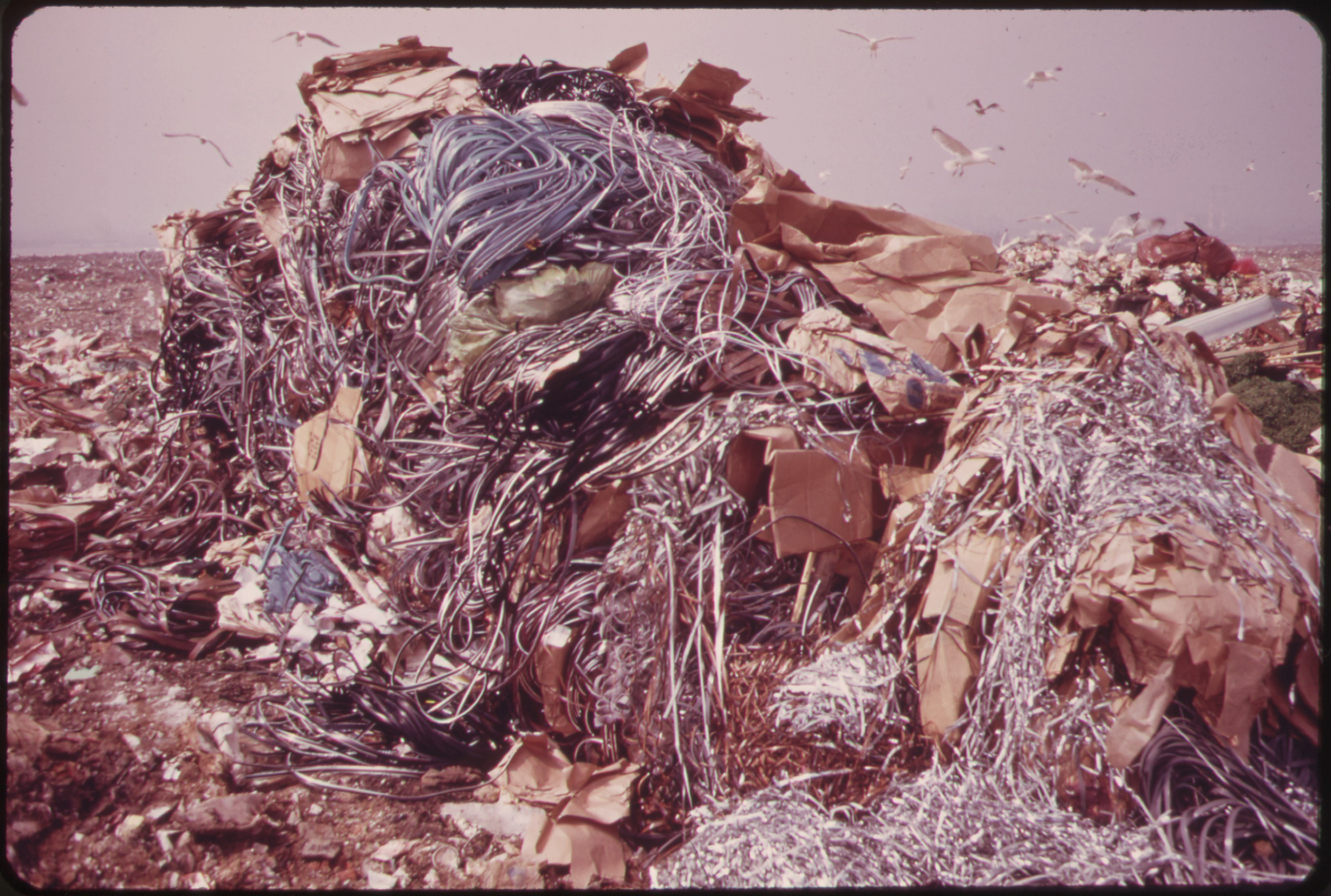
Various landfilling operations in the Spring Creek area in 1973

Beginning in the 1920s, the city planned to develop a large ship and rail terminal along Jamaica Bay, particularly along the Paerdegat Basin in nearby Canarsie, to relieve port operations in the greater New York Harbor. The project would have included construction of new rail facilities to connect with the Long Island Rail Road, New York Connecting Railroad, and a proposed rail tunnel to Staten Island. Around this time, a street grid was mapped in Spring Creek, though most of the streets had yet to be constructed. In 1930, Spring Creek Park and the Shore Parkway portion of the Belt Parkway were proposed by Robert Moses, along with several other parks and highways. Land for both projects along Jamaica Bay in the area was acquired via eminent domain in 1938, and Shore Parkway opened in 1940, with an interchange to the south end of Pennsylvania Avenue. This put an end to the proposed Jamaica Bay seaport. Later plans by Robert Moses in the 1950s called for Spring Creek Park to extend to Cross Bay Boulevard in Howard Beach, Queens and include a new beach and boat basin.

The Milford Street Landfill began operations in the 1930s, occupying much of the area where the Gateway Center now sits. The Milford Street Landfill was closed in 1950. This area later became known as the Vandalia Dunes due to its sandy landscape, and became a habitat for the Henslow's sparrow and other bird species. The South Shore Incinerator at Forbell Street and Wortman Avenue was dedicated on June 30, 1954, and the Pennsylvania and Fountain Avenue Landfills were opened in 1956 and 1961 respectively, on land previously earmarked for Spring Creek Park. Ash from the incinerator was used as additional fill for the marshes. A sewage treatment plant adjacent to Hendrix Creek was also opened around this time, while refuse was used to landfill the future Spring Creek Park.

In spite of the new highway, Spring Creek Basin, as the area was then called, continued to remain undeveloped while other local areas were extensively built up. This was in part due to its remoteness from the city's focal points (such as Manhattan and Downtown Brooklyn), its distance away from the nearest rapid transit lines, the presence of the landfills, incinerator, and water treatment plant in the area, and noise from the nearby Idlewild Airport (since renamed as John F. Kennedy International Airport). A 1943 city profile called the area "Brooklyn's least populated district", with many paper streets remaining as mapped but not constructed. Smoke and odor from the incinerator and landfills, meanwhile, were reported to extend to the Queens neighborhoods of Howard Beach and Ozone Park. The remoteness of the area led it to be used as an illegal dumping ground for waste. The territory, particularly the landfills, is also said to have been used for dumping corpses, most notably by Murder, Inc. and the Gambino crime family; human remains from modern incidents have been unearthed as recently as 2013.

=== Urban renewal and development ===
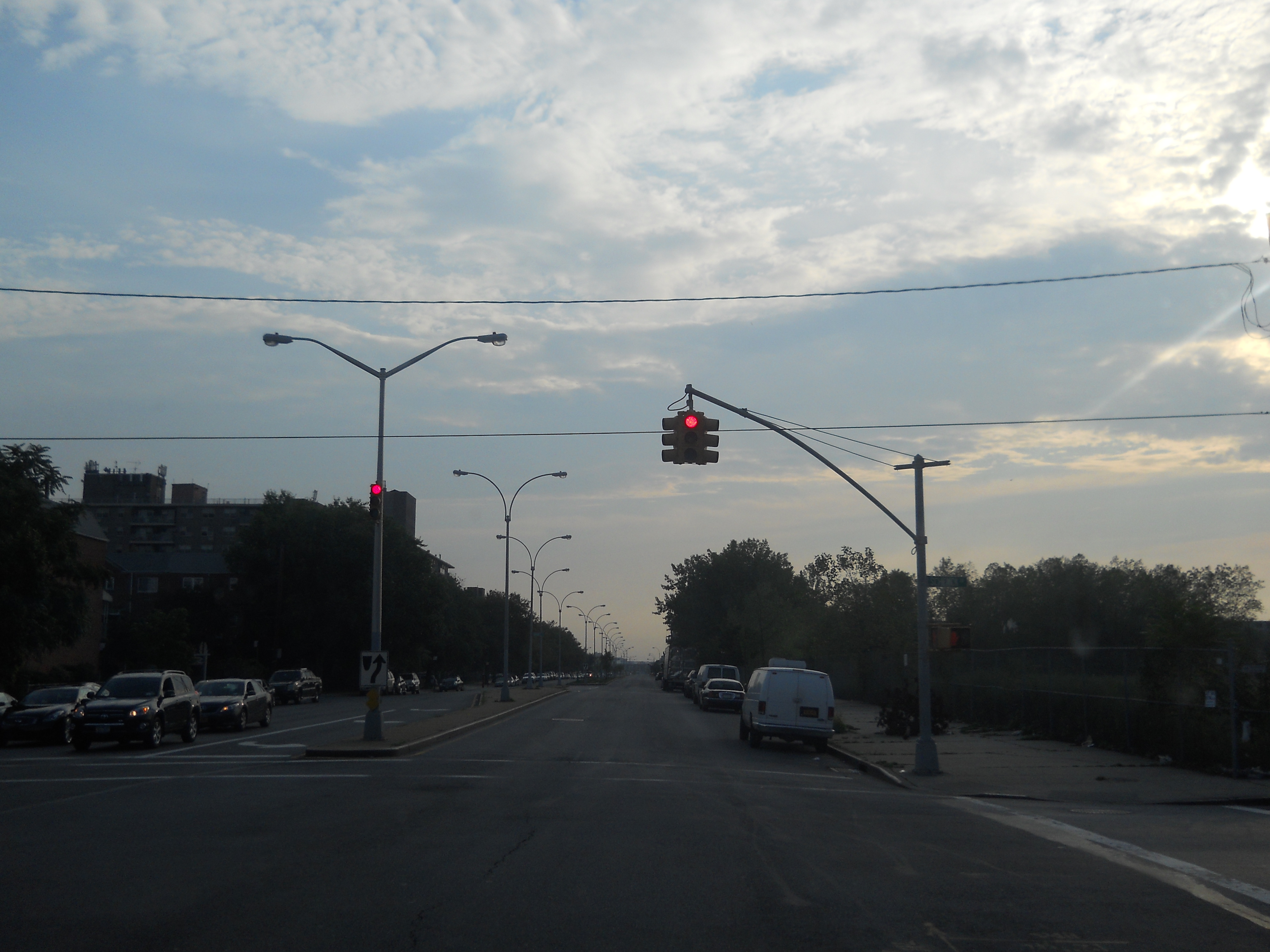
Flatlands Avenue and Schenck Avenue in 2011. The lot to the right has yet to be developed

In 1967, the area south of Flatlands Avenue between Schenck and Fountain Avenues (on the peninsula between Hendrix and Spring Creeks) was designated as the Fresh Creek Urban Renewal Area (FCURA). During this time, the remaining 19th-century buildings in this vicinity were demolished. That year, a major development project was proposed, which would include a state mental health facility, several intermediate schools, a high school, a community college, a shopping center, a branch library, an expansion of Spring Creek Park, and several thousand housing units including 8,000 middle-income condominium-style units. In preparation for the development, in 1968 under the city's Program for Action, it was proposed to extend the IRT New Lots Line and the BMT Canarsie Line of the New York City Subway to the Spring Creek area; the New Lots Line would have been extended to Flatlands Avenue near Elton and Linwood Streets. These extensions were canceled in the mid-1970s, largely due to the city's fiscal crisis at the time. Under the 1967 FCURA plan, the mental health facility (called the Brooklyn Developmental Center) was opened in 1973, the rental complex (the Starrett City apartment complex) opened in 1974, and the Spring Creek branch of the Brooklyn Public Library opened in the summer of 1977. The area was officially given the name Spring Creek in 1973 by Brooklyn borough president Sebastian Leone.

Following community protests, and seepage of contaminated oil into Jamaica Bay, the Pennsylvania and Fountain landfills ceased municipal waste operations in 1979 and 1985 respectively, after which they were absorbed into the Gateway National Recreation Area. On June 25, 1996, the New York City Council amended the original Fresh Creek Urban Renewal Plan to facilitate the Gateway Estates plan, a massive mixed-use proposal to redevelop 227 acres of landfill south of Flatlands Avenue. Expanding on the 1967 plan, it proposed to construct a 640,000-square-foot (59,000 m^{2}) retail development and 2,385 units of affordable housing. Ground broke on the Gateway Center shopping mall on November 16, 2000, and it opened on October 1, 2002. Restoration of the Pennsylvania and Fountain Avenue Landfills meanwhile began in March 2002.

In early 2007, the second phase of the Gateway Estates project (Gateway Estates II) was proposed, which included a 605,000 square feet (56,200 m^{2}) expansion of the Gateway Center, 2,385 additional affordable housing units, and a new public school facility. The school facility, Spring Creek Educational Campus, opened in fall 2012. Gateway Center II opened in stages beginning in late 2014.

== Housing ==
=== Starrett City ===
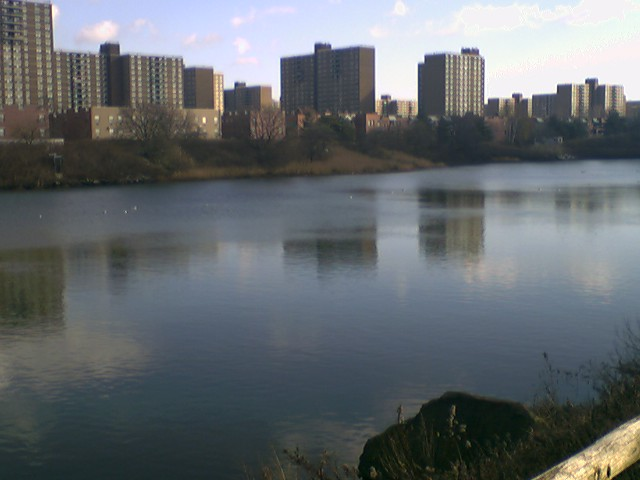
Starrett City; Fresh Creek Basin is in the foreground

Starrett City (also known as Spring Creek Towers) is the largest subsidized rental apartment complex in the United States. Its boundaries, starting from the north and moving clockwise are: Flatlands Avenue to the north, Hendrix Street to the east, Jamaica Bay to the south and the Fresh Creek Basin. Opened in 1974, the Starrett City site spanned over 153 acres (0.62 km^{2}) before being subdivided in 2009 as part of a refinancing. The housing development contains 5,881 apartment units in 46 buildings. The residential site also includes eight parking garages and a community center. The area contains a shopping center as well. A number of parcels of undeveloped land totaling 13 acres (5.3 ha) were separated out from the residential site as part of the refinancing.

The development was designed by Herman Jessor, organized in the towers in the park layout. The buildings utilize a simple "foursquare" design. The residential portion of the property has eight "sections" each including several buildings, its own field, recreational area (jungle gym, park, handball court, basketball court) and a five-story parking garage for residents in that section. These sections are Ardsley, Bethel, Croton, Delmar, Elmira, Freeport, Geneva, and Hornell; each named after municipalities in New York State. The community had its own newspaper, known as the Spring Creek Sun.

=== Nehemiah Spring Creek ===
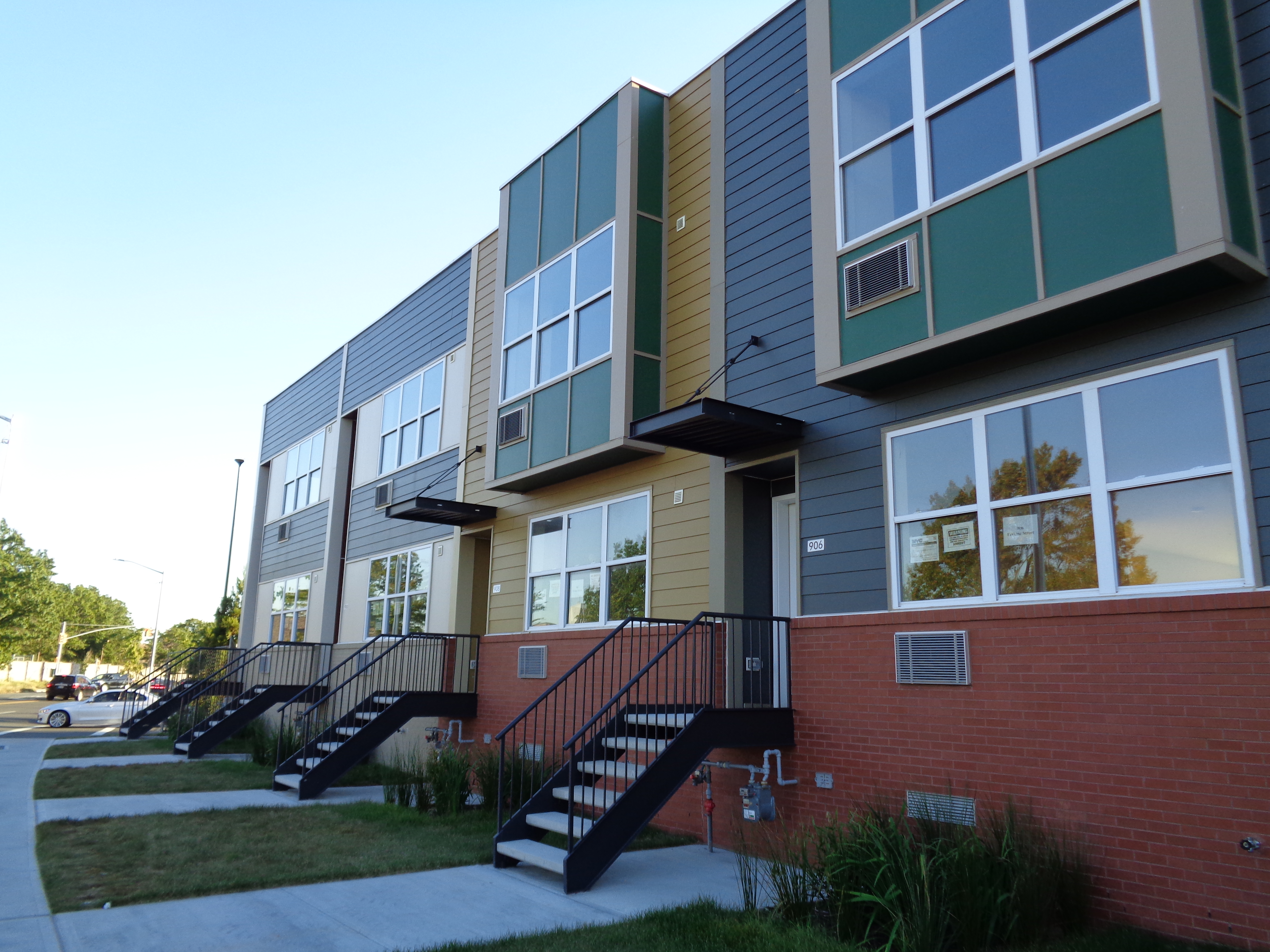
The colorful houses in the Nehemiah Spring Creek development

Nehemiah Spring Creek, or Spring Creek Nehemiah, is one of two affordable housing developments built under the Gateway Estates plan (along with Gateway Elton). Located south of Flatlands Avenue and north of Gateway Center II between Elton and Erskine Streets, the neighborhood consists of modular prefabricated one-to-three family rowhouses assembled at the Brooklyn Navy Yard. The houses were designed by Soho-based architect Alexander Gorlin. Nehemiah, operated by East Brooklyn Congregations (EBC), previously constructed other developments in the East New York and Brownsville areas in the 1980s.

The land was originally assigned by the city to the Starrett Housing Corporation for development in 1989; the project was known as Spring Creek Estates. EBC began competing with Starrett for the site in 1992. The name was changed to Gateway Estates in 1994. By the project's groundbreaking in August 2006, Starrett Housing had backed out of the plan, and the name was changed to Nehemiah Spring Creek Houses at Gateway Estates. The first phase of the development was completed in 2008. Residents of the community apply for housing via a lottery; some applied during the project's planning in the 1990s.

=== Gateway Elton ===
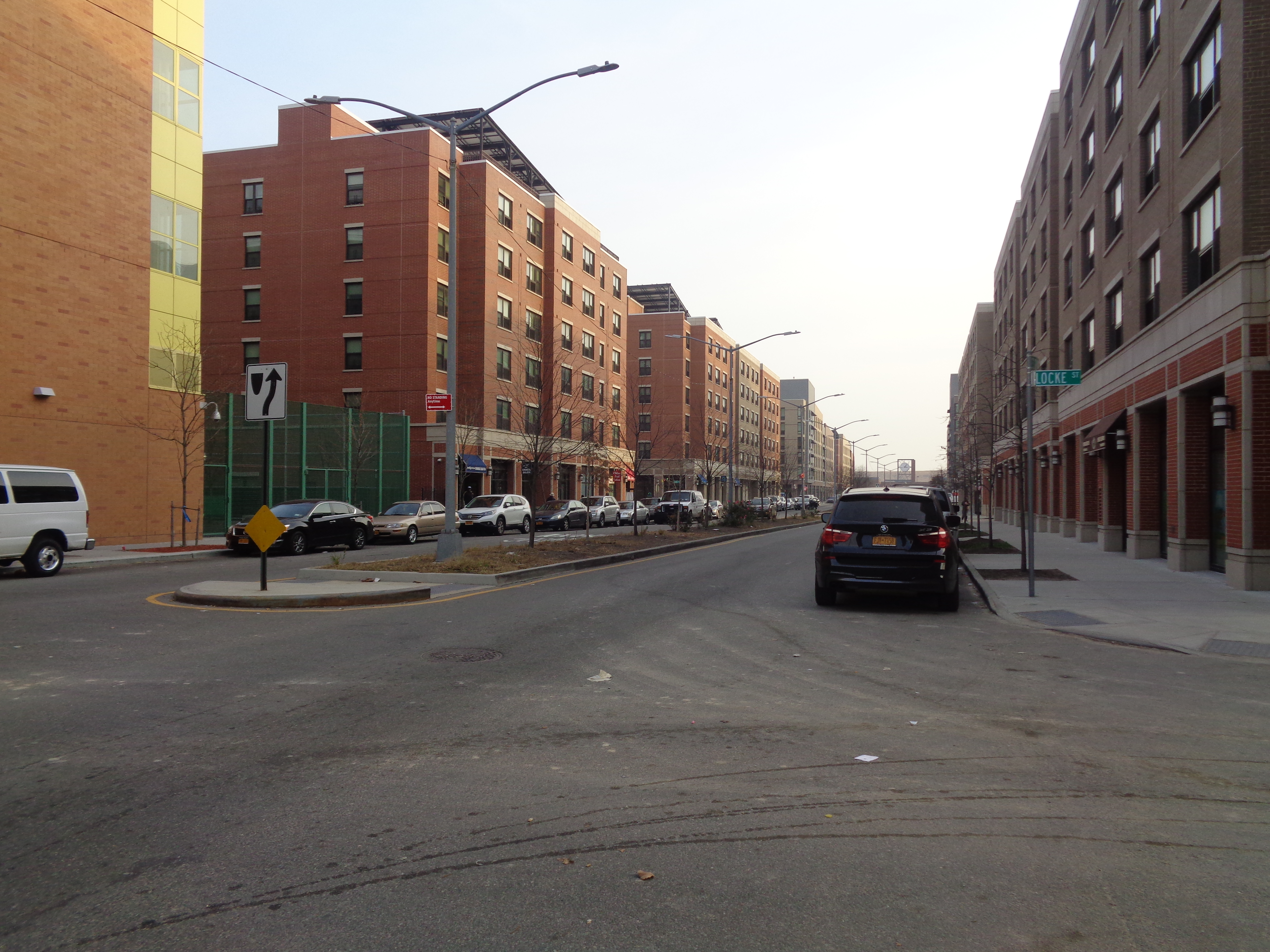
Gateway Elton Street in December 2015

Gateway Elton Street sits at the west end of Nehemiah Spring Creek, on Elton Street between Flatlands Avenue and the Gateway Center. The three-phase affordable-housing project features six-story apartment buildings with retail space on the ground level. The buildings utilize electricity from solar panels affixed to the roofing. The first phase of the project, featuring 197 rental units, was completed in 2012. The second phase broke ground on May 2, 2013. Construction on the third phase started on January 15, 2015. and a housing lottery for the project was held upon its completion in July 2016.

=== Spring Creek Gardens ===
Spring Creek Gardens is a third low-income housing complex in the northeast corner of Spring Creek near the border with Lindenwood, Queens, one block south of Linden Boulevard. Located at 902 Drew Street, it is bound by Loring Avenue to the north, Stanley Avenue and the remnants of Spring Creek to the south, Forbell Street to the west, and Emerald Street to the east. The community is gated, with the primary entrance situated at Drew Street. It was opened in 1989, developed by General Atlantic Realty Corporation, and paid for by Federal Low Income Housing Tax Credits and the city's 421a tax-abatement certificates. It was sold to the Domain Companies and the Arker Companies in 2006.

== Industry and commerce ==
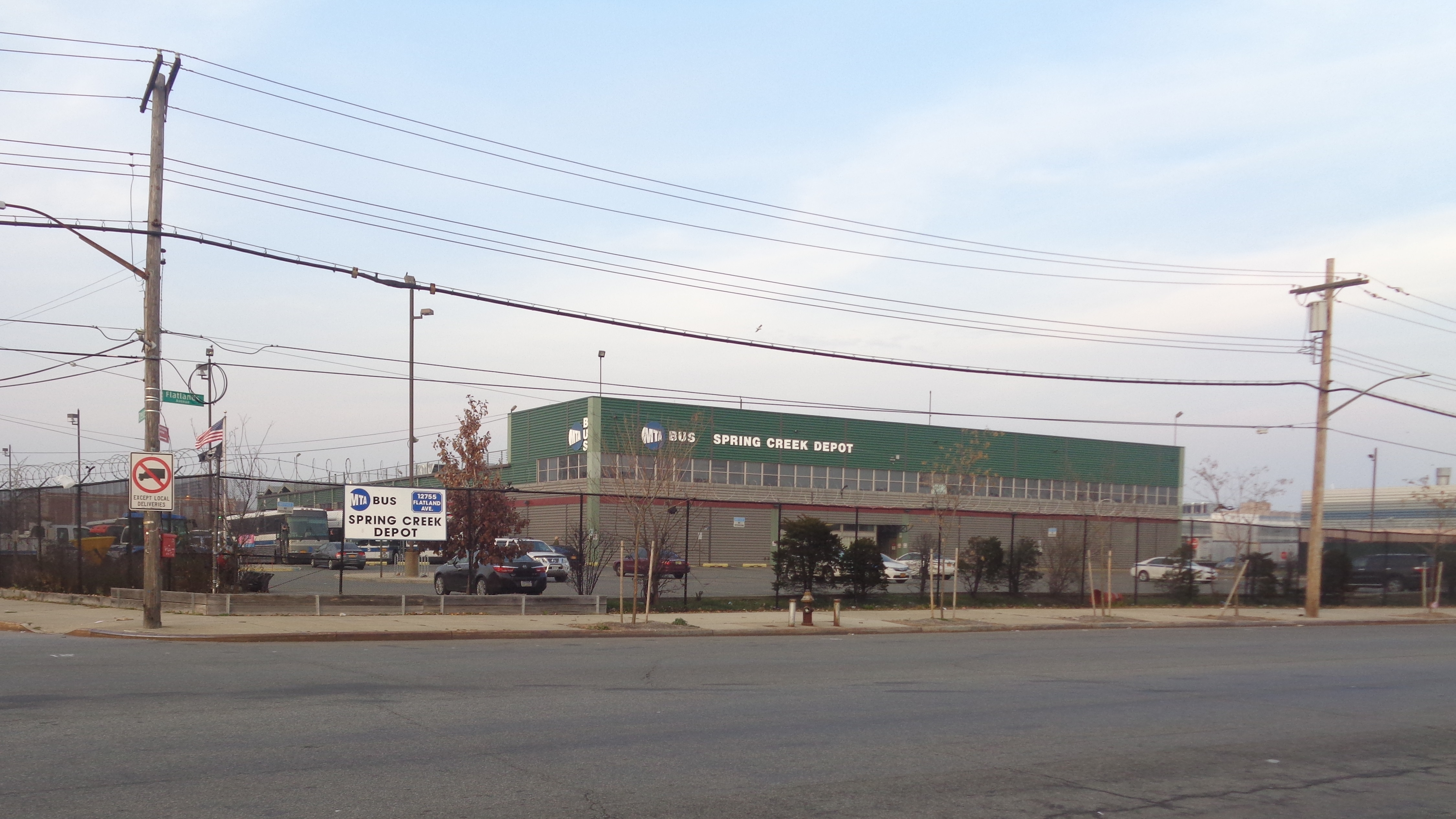
Looking at the Spring Creek Depot from Flatlands Avenue

Several industrial and commercial structures are located in the northeastern portion of the area east of Fountain Avenue and south of Linden Boulevard, the former Plunders Neck area. At 803 Forbell Street in this part of the neighborhood, the South Shore Incinerator, also known as the Forbell Street Incinerator, was active from 1954 to the 1980s. Other structures in this area include:

- Spring Creek Auxiliary Water Pollution Control Plant (Spring Creek AWPCP), operated by the New York City Department of Environmental Protection (NYCDEP).
- Spring Creek Yard Waste Composting Facility, operated by the New York City Department of Sanitation (DSNY) at the former incinerator site. The incinerator facility is now used as a garage for cleaning and derelict vehicle storage. Two other DSNY facilities are located west of Fountain Avenue, at Milford Street and at Georgia Avenue. The Georgia Avenue location is also a former incinerator plant, having operated from about 1920 through at least the mid-1930s.
- Spring Creek Depot, operated by the MTA Bus Company.
- United States Postal Service Brooklyn Processing and Distribution Center, also known as the Brooklyn P&DC, the Brooklyn General Mail Facility, or simply the Postal Facility, at 1050 Forbell Street. Constructed in 1991, it occupies a large area between the bus depot and DSNY facility.

Other structures in the rest of Spring Creek include:

- 26th Ward Water Pollution Control Plant, also operated by the NYCDEP, in Starrett City on the shore of Hendrix Creek. It was opened in the 1950s.
- Flatlands Fairfield Industrial Park, north of Flatlands Avenue.

== Parks and recreation ==
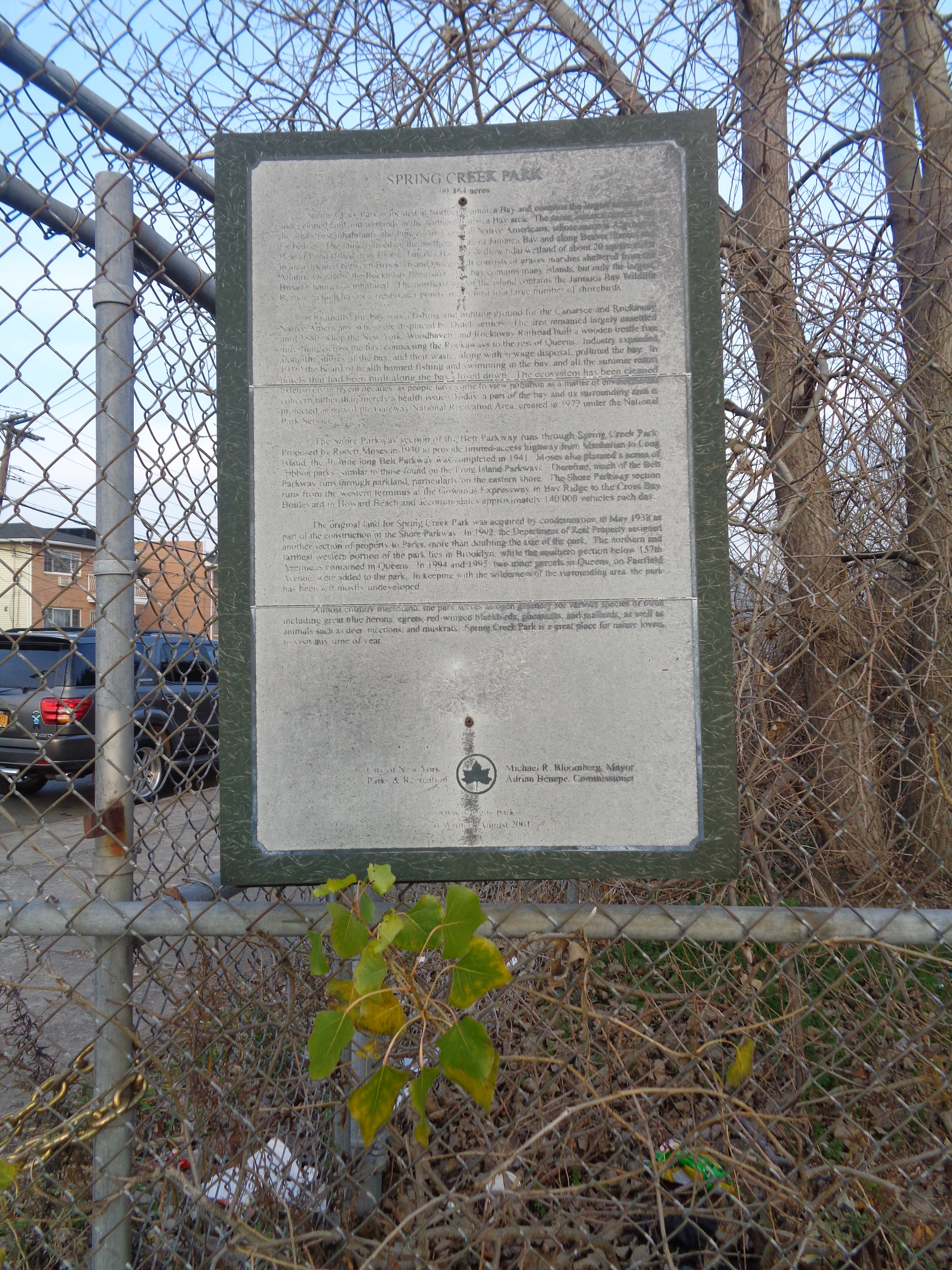
A plaque at an inaccessible section of Spring Creek Park at Flatlands and Fountain Avenues

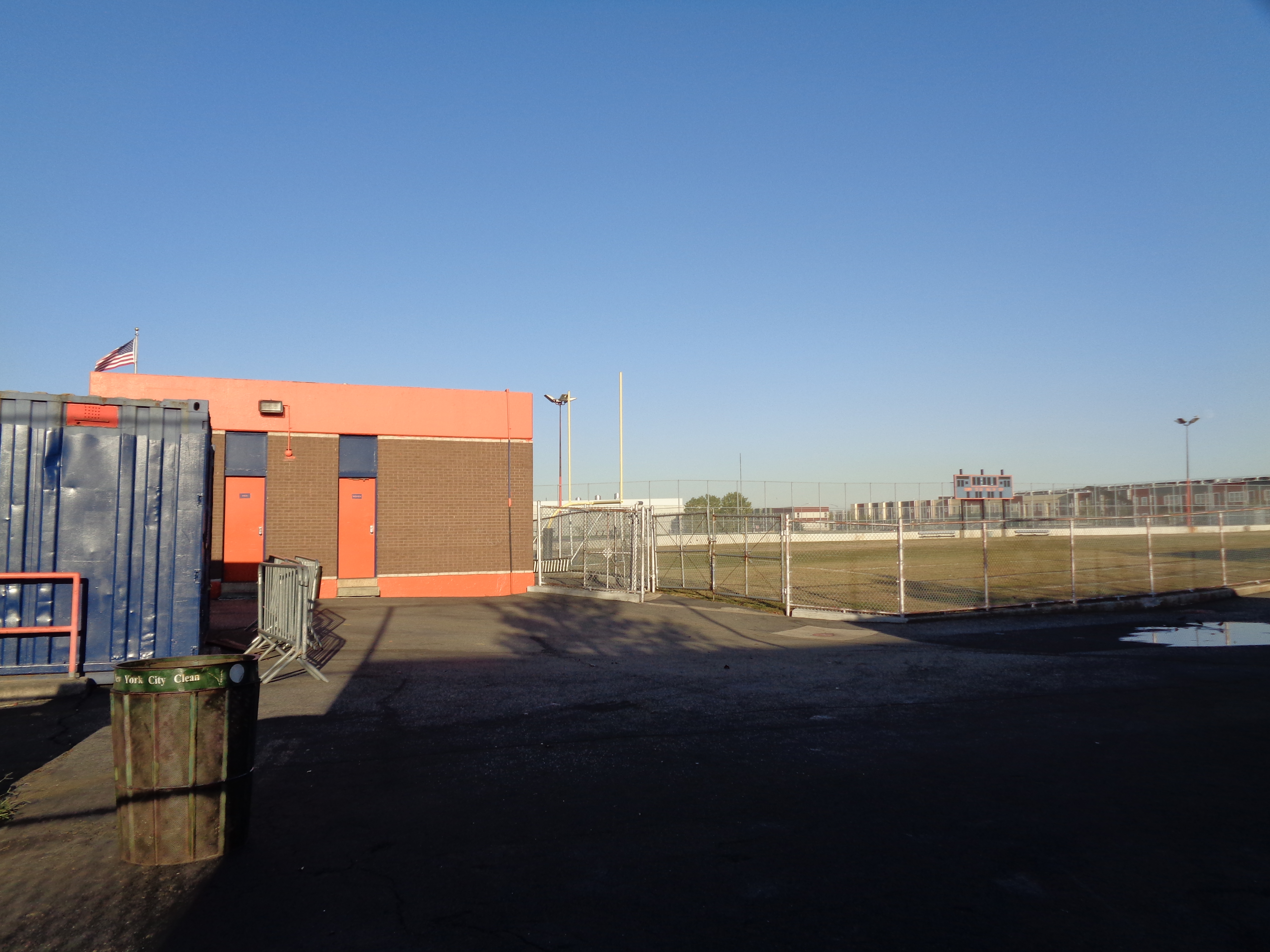
The athletic complex for Thomas Jefferson High School

Moe Finklestein Athletic Complex (also known as the Thomas Jefferson High School Field), located on Flatlands Avenue between Essex Street and Erskine Street, is used by the schools of Thomas Jefferson Educational Campus and other schools in PSAL competition. The complex was created as part of the Fresh Creek Renewal Plan.

Berriman Playground, a .96-acre (0.39 ha) park on Berriman Street between Vandalia Avenue and Schroeders Avenue, opened in 2019. Its design allows rain water from the playground to collect in a rain garden.

Spring Creek Park is operated by both the city and the federal government. It consists of man-made parkland, marshland along the Jamaica Bay Shore, and the former Pennsylvania and Fountain Avenue Landfills.

Shirley Chisholm State Park, a 407-acre (165 ha) state park, is located atop the Pennsylvania and Fountain Avenue Landfills south of the Belt Parkway. The Pennsylvania Avenue section opened in July 2019, and the Fountain Avenue expansion is expected to open in 2021.

== Retail ==
There are two major shopping malls in the area:

- Gateway Center, located on Erskine Street and Gateway Drive across from the Brooklyn Developmental Center. The two-part suburban-style complex was built as the retail component of Gateway Estates. The southern portion opened in 2002, and the northern (Gateway Center II) in 2014.
- Spring Creek Towers Shopping Center, located in Starrett City.

== Schools ==
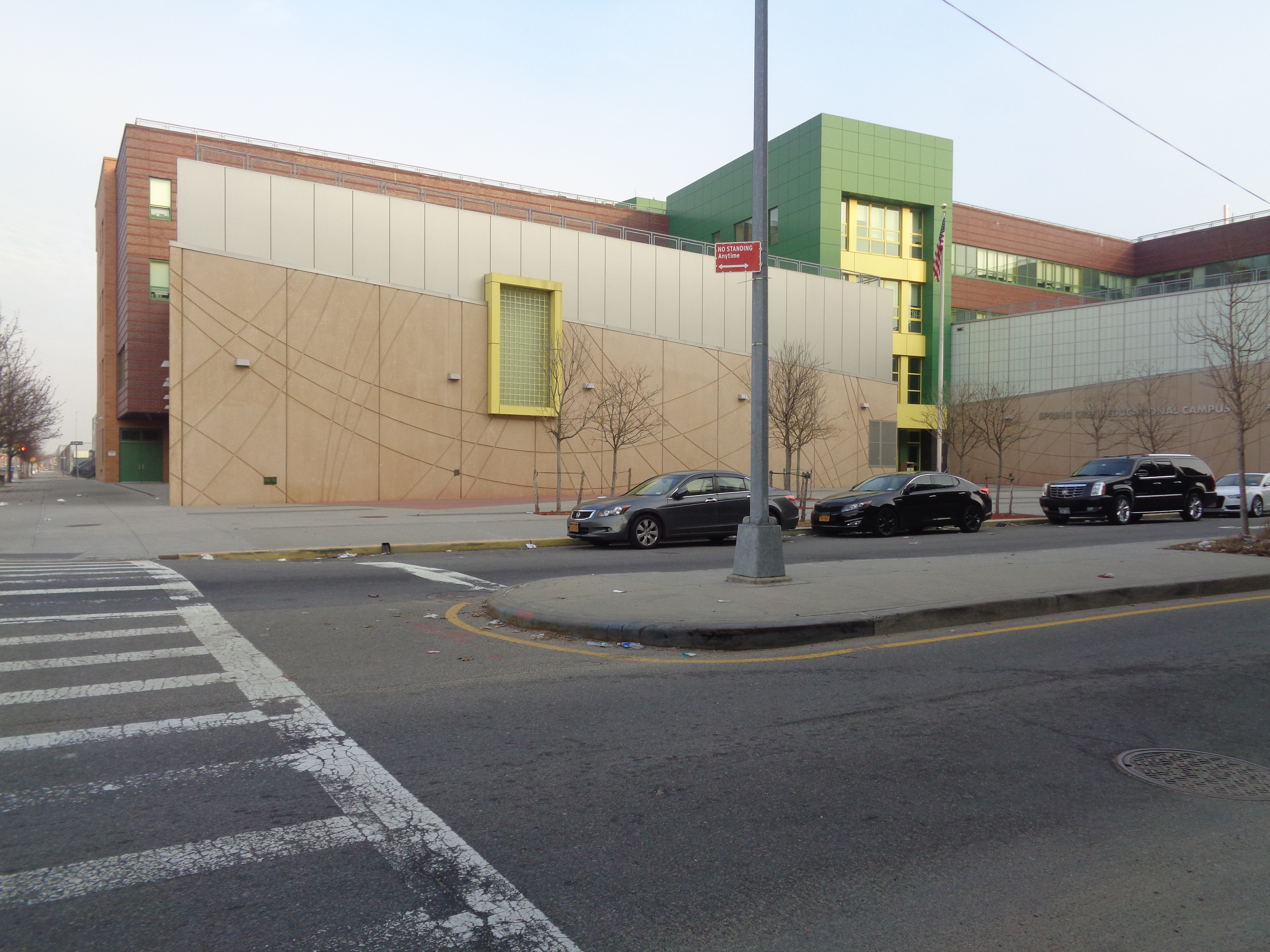
Spring Creek Campus on Elton Street and Flatlands Avenue

A branch of the New York School of Career and Applied Studies, part of Touro College, is located in Starrett City. There are four elementary schools located in the neighborhood:

- Abe Stark Elementary School (PS 346)
- Gateway Intermediate School (IS 364)
- Frederick Douglass Academy VIII Middle School (located on the 4th floor of PS 346)
- Be'er Hagolah, a religious (Jewish) school

Other schools in the area include:.

- P.S. 273 Wortman, on Jerome Street and Cozine Avenue.
- P.S. 224 Hale A Woodruff, on Wortman and Autumn Avenues near the Postal Facility
- George Gershwin Junior High School, on Linden Boulevard and Van Siclen Avenue, also housing the Achievement First Linden Elementary School and The UFT Charter High School.
- Spring Creek Educational Campus, opened in fall 2012 at Flatlands Avenue and Elton Street during Gateway Estates II, at a cost of $73 million. It features the Academy for Young Writers (a high school), and Spring Creek Community School (a grade 6–12 school)

The William H. Maxwell Vocational High School and Thomas Jefferson Educational Campus (formerly Thomas Jefferson High School) are located on Pennsylvania Avenue in the northern portions of East New York. Additionally, the Canarsie and South Shore Campuses (also formerly high schools) are located in the adjacent Canarsie neighborhood.

== Transportation ==
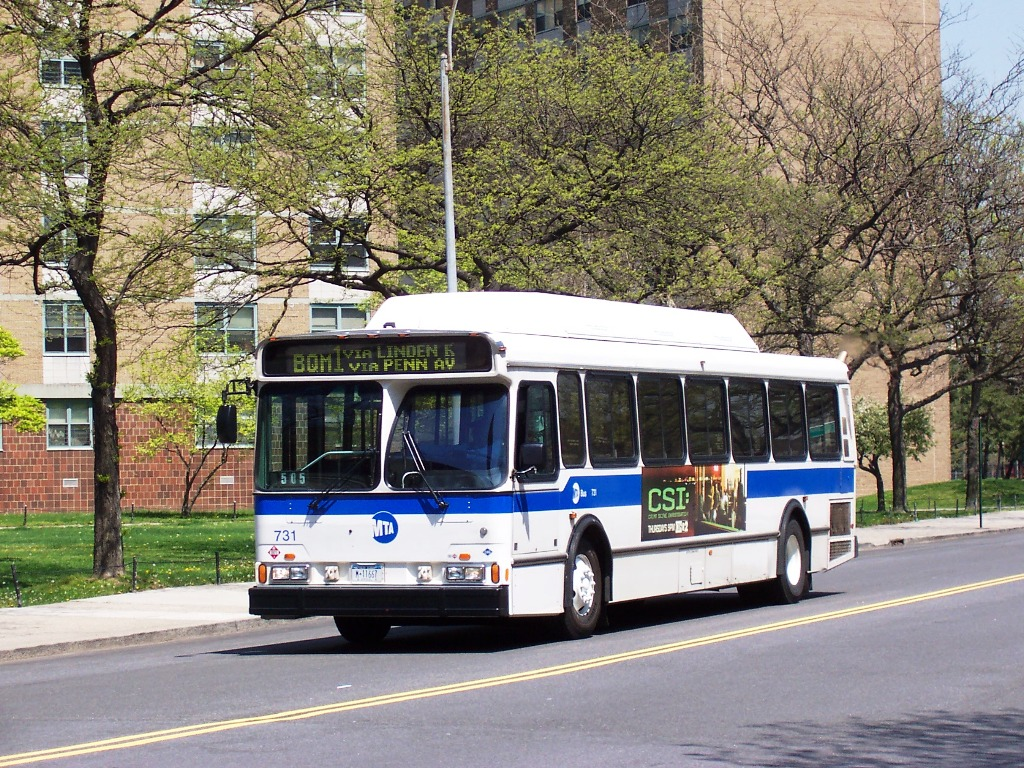
A BQM1 express bus (now the BM5) in Starrett City in 2006

The B6, B13, B14, B15, B20, B82, B82 SBS, B83, B84 and Q8 local buses serve the Spring Creek area, while the BM2 and BM5 provide express service to Midtown and Lower Manhattan. The B13, B83, B84 and Q8 serve the area around Gateway Mall and the Brooklyn Developmental Center; the B13, B83 and Q8 were extended to the area following the opening of Gateway in 2002, while the B84 was created in 2013 to serve as a connector to local subway service. The B82, B82 SBS, B83, BM2, and BM5 serve the Starrett City neighborhood along Pennsylvania Avenue, while the B13, B14, B15, B20, and BM5 serve the area around Spring Creek Gardens and the Brooklyn Postal Facility.

The closest New York City Subway stations to the area are New Lots Avenue in East New York, served by the 2, 3, 4, and 5 trains (connected to Spring Creek by the B6 and B84 buses), and Rockaway Parkway in Canarsie, served by the L train (connected by the B6 and B82/B82 SBS). Residents also use the Euclid Avenue station served by the A and C trains on Pitkin Avenue at the north end of East New York (connected by the B13 and Q8).
