= Brooklyn Community Board 5 =

Brooklyn Community District 5
- Community District
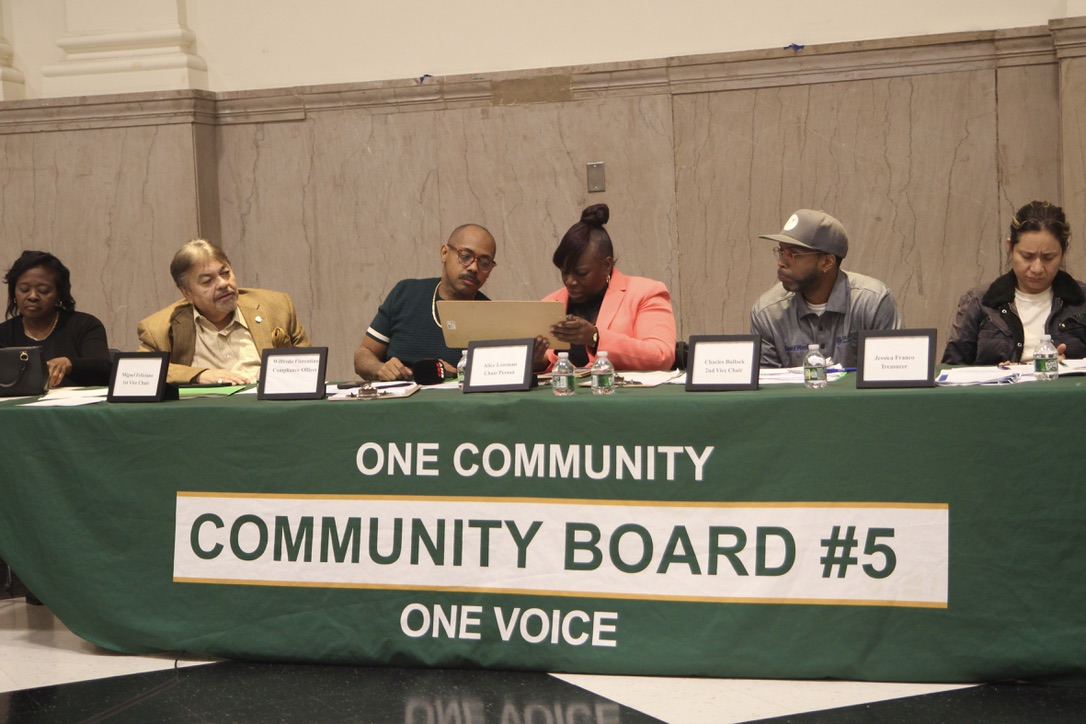
- Brooklyn Community Board 5 on Sept. 25, 2025
- Country: United States
- State: New York
- City: New York City
- Borough: Brooklyn
- Neighborhoods: List: East New York; Cypress Hills; Highland Park; City Line; New Lots; Spring Creek; Starrett City

Government
  - Chairperson: Alice Lowman
  - District Manager: Melinda Perkins

Area
  - Total: 5.6 sq mi (15 km^{2})

Population (2010)
  - Total: 182,896
  - Density: 33,000/sq mi (13,000/km^{2})

Ethnicity
  - African-American: 52.1%
  - Asian: 4.6%
  - Hispanic and Latino Americans: 37.1%
  - White: 3.8%
  - Others: 2.4%
- Time zone: UTC−5 (Eastern)
  - Summer (DST): UTC−4 (EDT)
- ZIP codes: 11207, 11208, and 11239
- Area code: 718, 347, 929, and 917
- Police Precincts: 75th (website)
- Website: www.brooklyncb5.org

Brooklyn Community Board 5 is a New York City community board that encompasses the Brooklyn neighborhoods of East New York, Cypress Hills, Highland Park, New Lots, City Line, Spring Creek, and Starrett City. It is delimited by Van Sinderen Avenue on the west, the Queens Borough line on the north and on the east, as well as by the Gateway National Recreation Area, Louisiana and Stanley Avenue on the south.

Its current chairperson is Alice Lowman, and its district manager is Melinda Perkins.

As of the United States Census, 2000, the Community Board has a population of 173,198, up from 161,350 in 1990 and 154,932 in 1980.

Of them (as of 2000), 8,785 (5.1%) are White non Hispanic, 84,838 (49.0%) are African-American, 6,007 (3.5%) Asian or Pacific Islander, 733 (0.4%) American Indian or Native Alaskan, 2,251 (1.3%) of some other race, 5,272 (3.0%) of two or more race, 65,312 (37.7%) of Hispanic origins.
46.6% of the population benefit from public assistance as of 2004, up from 32.2% in 2000.

The land area is 3,612.7 acres (14.620 km^{2}).
