= Michael Gecan =

American activist

Michael Gecan is a community organizer in New York City affiliated with the Industrial Areas Foundation. He was trained in part by Saul Alinsky. He is lead organizer for East Brooklyn Congregations and other New York-based organizations. He is the executive director of United Power for Action and Justice, a Chicago Based Industrial Area Foundation affiliate. He is the author of Going Public: An Organizer's Guide to Citizen Action (Anchor Books, 2004). ISBN 1-4000-7649-8.

Gecan has authored pieces on the Democratic Party in The Washington Post, contemporary politics in New York Daily News, a series on populism and the Tea Party for the Australian Broadcasting Corporation, among others.
