= List of ferries across the East River =

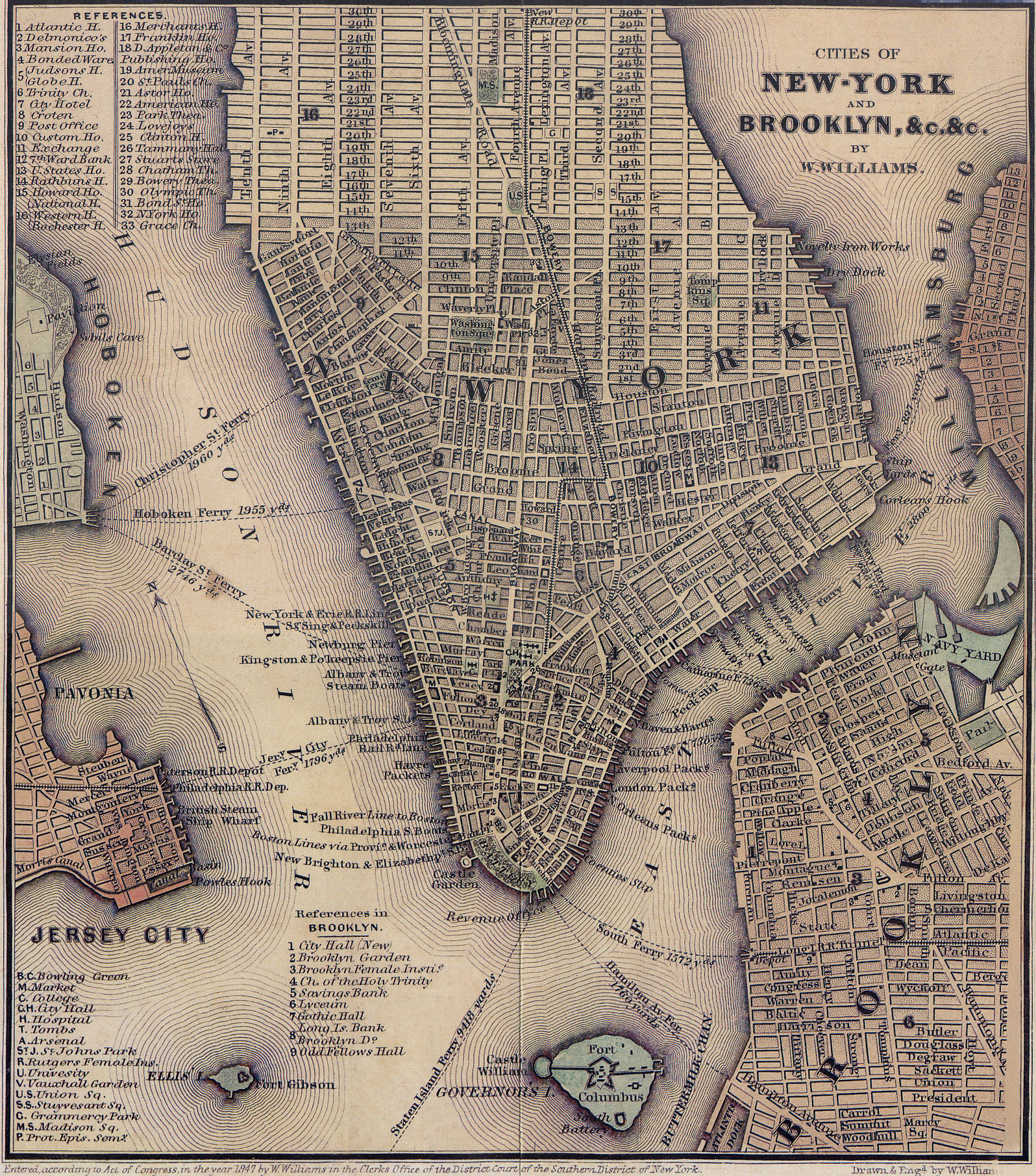
Map from 1847 showing the routes of ferries in Lower Manhattan, Jersey City, Hoboken, and Brooklyn.

The following ferries cross or once crossed the East River in New York City.

== Manhattan–Brooklyn–Queens–Manhattan ==
Name	Manhattan end	Brooklyn stops	Queens stop	Manhattan end	Operated
East River Ferry	Pier 11/Wall Street	Fulton Ferry Landing; Schaefer Landing; Williamsburg, Greenpoint	Hunter's Point South	East 34th Street	2017–present

== Manhattan–Brooklyn–Queens ==
Name	Manhattan end	Brooklyn stops	Queens end	Operated
Rockaway Ferry	Pier 11/Wall Street	Sunset Park	Rockaway	2017–present

== Manhattan–Brooklyn ==
One of the first documented team boats in commercial service in the United States was "put in service in 1814 on a run between Brooklyn and Manhattan." It took "8 to 18 minutes to cross the East River and carried an average of 200 passengers, plus horses and vehicles." Team boats served New York City for "about ten years, from 1814-1824. They were of eight horse-power and crossed the rivers in from twelve to twenty minutes."

Name	Manhattan end	Intermediate stops	Brooklyn end	Operated
Bay Ridge Ferry	South Ferry		65th Street, Bay Ridge	
New York and South Brooklyn Ferry	Battery Maritime Building, formerly known as Municipal Ferry Pier		39th Street Ferry Terminal, South Brooklyn	to 1935
Hamilton Avenue Ferry	South Ferry		Hamilton Avenue, South Brooklyn	1846 – ????
South Ferry	South Ferry		South Ferry (Atlantic Avenue), Downtown Brooklyn	1836 – ????
Wall Street Ferry	Wall Street Ferry Terminal		Montague Street, Downtown Brooklyn	1853–1912
Fulton Ferry	Fulton Slip, earlier Broad Street, then Maiden Lane		Fulton Ferry, earlier Joralemon Street, Downtown Brooklyn	ca. 1650 – ????
Peck Slip Ferry	Peck Slip		Broadway, Williamsburg	1836–1860
Roosevelt Street Ferry	Roosevelt Street		Bridge Street, Downtown Brooklyn	1853–1859
Roosevelt Street Ferry	Roosevelt Street, earlier James Slip		Broadway, earlier South Tenth Street, Williamsburg	1857 – ????
South Brooklyn Ferry	Pier 11/Wall Street	Governors Island; Fulton Ferry; Atlantic Avenue; Red Hook; Sunset Park	Bay Ridge	2017–present
Bridge Street Ferry	James Slip		Bridge Street, Downtown Brooklyn	1864–1874
Catherine Ferry	Catherine Slip		Main Street, Downtown Brooklyn	1795 – ????
Gouverneur Street Ferry	Gouverneur Slip		Bridge Street, earlier Hudson Avenue, Downtown Brooklyn	ca. 1850 – 1857
Navy Yard Ferry	Jackson Slip		Hudson Avenue, Downtown Brooklyn	1817 – ca. 1850; 1859–1868
Broadway Ferry	Grand Street		Broadway, Williamsburg	1851 – ????
Grand Street Ferry	Grand Street		Grand Street, Williamsburg	ca. 1797 – ????
North Second Street Ferry	Rivington Street		Metropolitan Avenue, Williamsburg	ca. 1805 – ca. 1815
Houston Street Ferry	Houston Street		Grand Street, Williamsburg	1840 – ????
Tenth Street Ferry	10th Street		Greenpoint Avenue, Greenpoint	1852 – ????
	14th Street		Greenpoint Avenue, Greenpoint	
23rd Street Ferry	23rd Street		Broadway, Williamsburg	
23rd Street Ferry	23rd Street		Greenpoint Avenue, Greenpoint	1857 – ????
42nd Street Ferry	42nd Street		Broadway, Williamsburg	1901–1909

== Manhattan–Queens ==
Name	Manhattan end	Intermediate stops	Queens end	Operated
Pan Am Water Shuttle (1987-1991); Delta Water Shuttle (1991-2000)	Pier 11/Wall Street	East 34th Street Ferry Landing; 62nd Street; 90th Street	Marine Air Terminal	August 24, 1987 – December 29, 2000
	Wall Street Ferry Terminal		Hunters Point Ferry Terminal	Long Island Rail Road, – September 30, 1908
	Pier 11/Wall Street		Hunters Point Ferry Terminal	September 3, 2002 – September 1, 2003
James Slip Ferry	James Slip		Hunters Point Ferry Terminal	East River Ferry Company, late 1850s? – May 1868; Long Island Rail Road, May 1868 – October 1, 1907
Calvary Cemetery Ferry	23rd Street		Calvary Cemetery	1851–1853
34th Street Ferry	East 34th Street Ferry Landing		Hunters Point Ferry Terminal	East River Ferry Company, April 20, 1859 – July 1887; Metropolitan Ferry Company, July 1887 – April 1, 1892; Long Island Rail Road, April 1, 1892 – March 3, 1925
East 34th Street Vehicular Ferry	East 34th Street Ferry Landing		Hunters Point Ferry Terminal	September 16, 1927 – July 15, 1936
	East 34th Street Ferry Landing		Hunters Point Ferry Terminal	October 17, 1994 – March 1, 2001; September 3, 2002 – September 1, 2003
Astoria Ferry (original)	92nd Street, earlier 86th Street		Astoria	ended January 1919
Astoria Ferry (2017)	East 34th Street Ferry Landing	Long Island City; Roosevelt Island	Astoria	August 29, 2017–present
Astoria Ferry (2017)	90th Street		Astoria	August 22, 2000–present
	99th Street		College Point	
	116th Street		Wards Island	

== The Bronx–Queens ==
Name	Bronx end	Queens end	Operated
	134th Street	North Brother Island	
	134th Street	Riker's Island	
	Clason's Point	College Point	to 1939

== See also ==
- List of fixed crossings of the East River
- List of fixed crossings of the Hudson River
- List of ferries across the Hudson River in New York City
