= Adams Street and Boerum Place Line =

Public transit line in Brooklyn, New York City

The Adams Street and Boerum Place Line was a public transit line in Downtown Brooklyn, New York City, United States, running along Boerum Place and Adams Street. It served as access for the Atlantic Avenue Railroad to the City Hall area.

== History ==
In 1873, the New York State Legislature passed a law authorizing the Atlantic Avenue Railroad, which included tracks through Atlantic Avenue from South Ferry to Flatbush Avenue, to build a branch north on Boerum Place and Adams Street to Front and Water Streets, where it would run to Fulton Ferry, using Water Street westbound and Front Street eastbound. It would use some Brooklyn City and Newtown Railroad (DeKalb Avenue Line) trackage in Front Street and Coney Island and Brooklyn Railroad (Smith Street Line) trackage in Water Street. After some delay caused by disagreements over the grade of the street and an injunction from the DeKalb Avenue Line over the use of its tracks in Front and Fulton Streets, the new line opened on May 13, 1874. By 1880, both directions had moved to Front Street, and the track on Adams Street between Front and Water Streets was unused.

On February 2, 1885, the Atlantic Avenue Railroad leased the South Brooklyn Central Railroad (Bergen Street Line), which ran from the Hamilton Ferry along Sackett Street, Hoyt Street, and Bergen Street to Albany Avenue. Tracks were laid in Boerum Place and Bergen Street, connecting this new acquisition to the junction at Atlantic Avenue and Boerum Place, and a new crosstown routing (the Hoyt and Sackett Streets Line) between Hamilton Ferry and Fulton Ferry, along Sackett Street, Hoyt Street, Bergen Street, Boerum Place, Smith Street, and Front and Water Streets, began operations on December 14, 1885. The line was changed to electric trolley operations on July 10, 1893.
