= South Ferry (Manhattan) =

Southern tip of Manhattan in New York City

Coordinates: 40°42′04″N 74°00′47″W

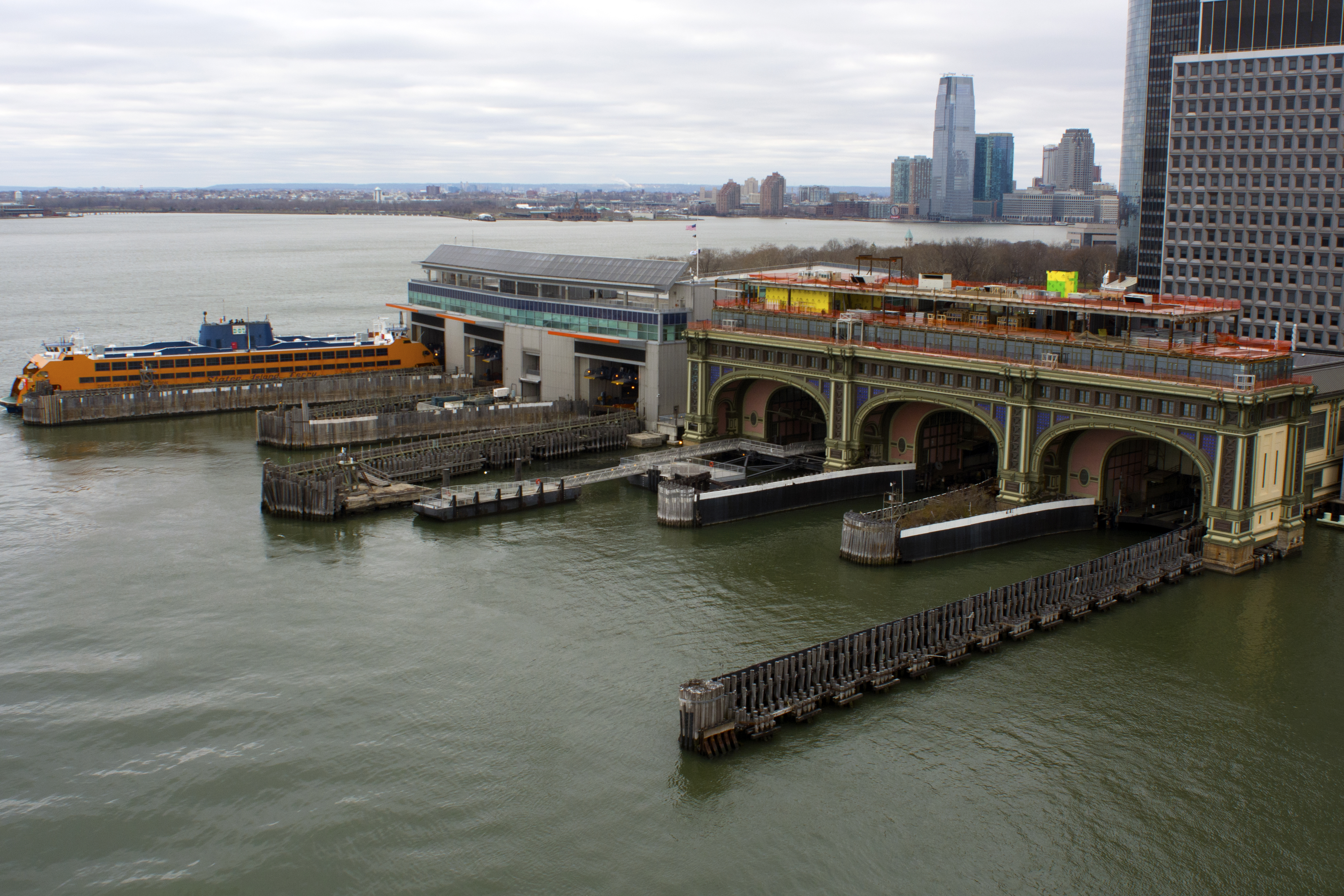
View of the slips of the ferry buildings in South Ferry (December 2014)

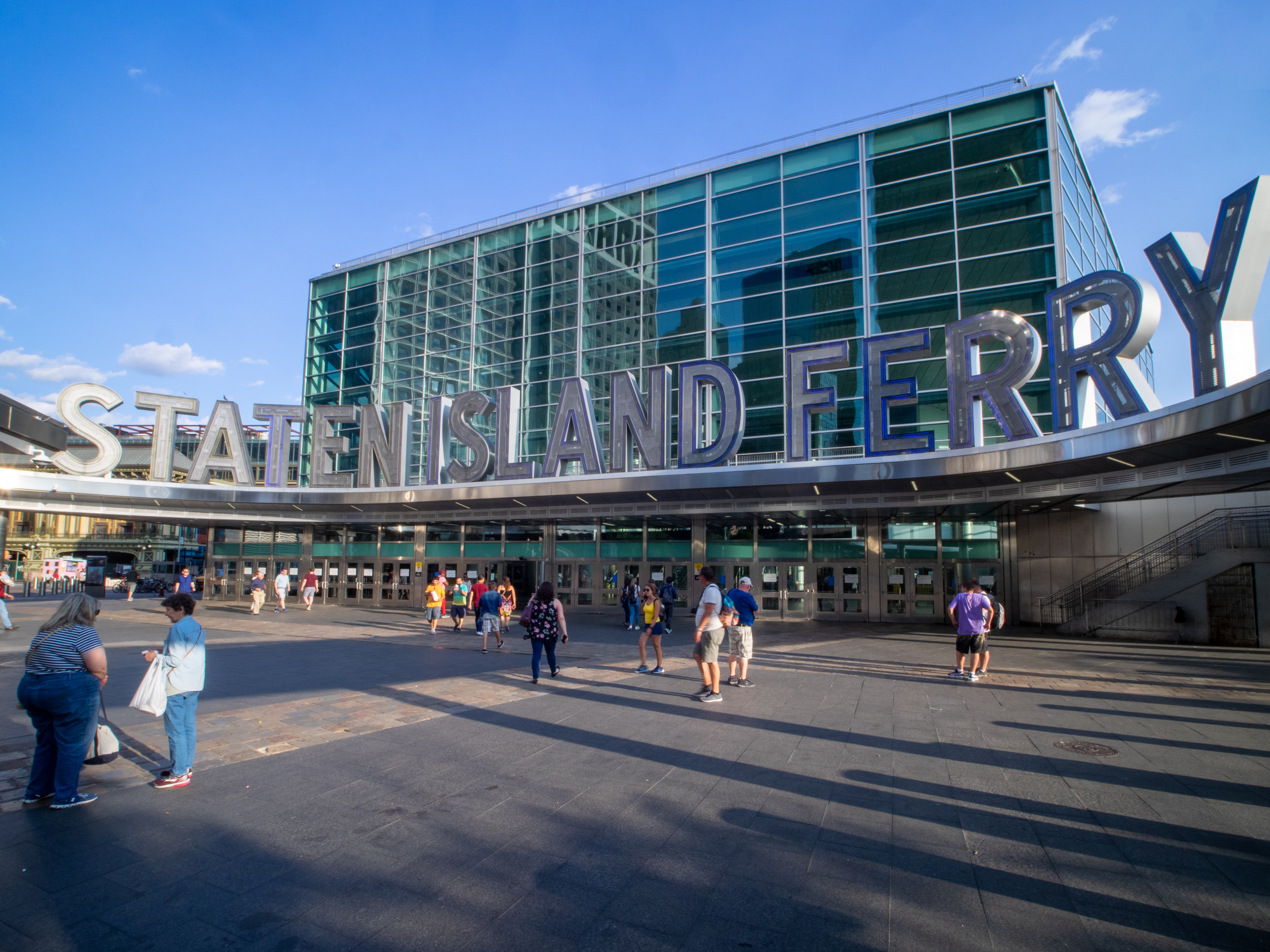
Front entrance of the Staten Island Ferry Whitehall Terminal

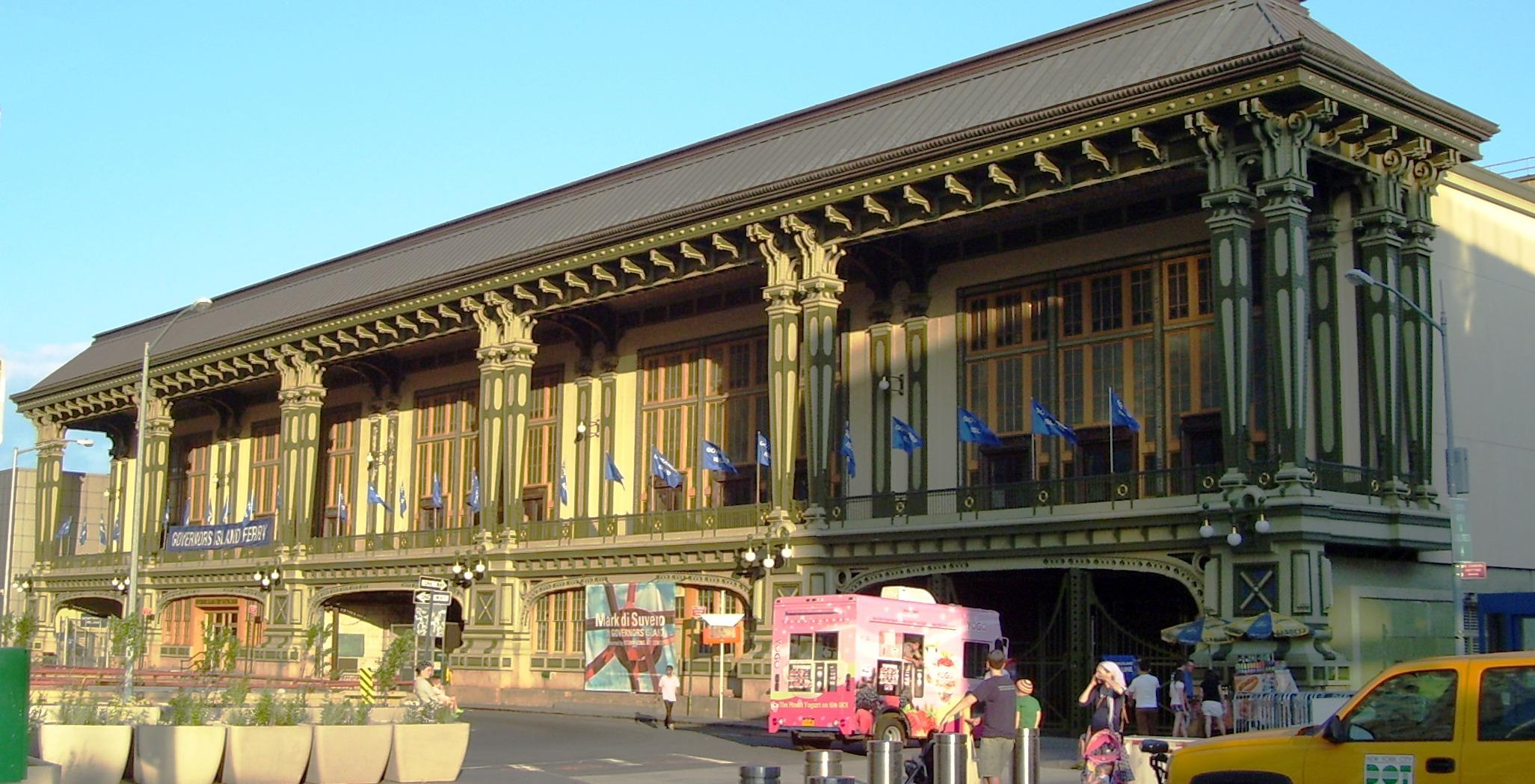
The Governors Island ferry leaves from the Battery Maritime Building

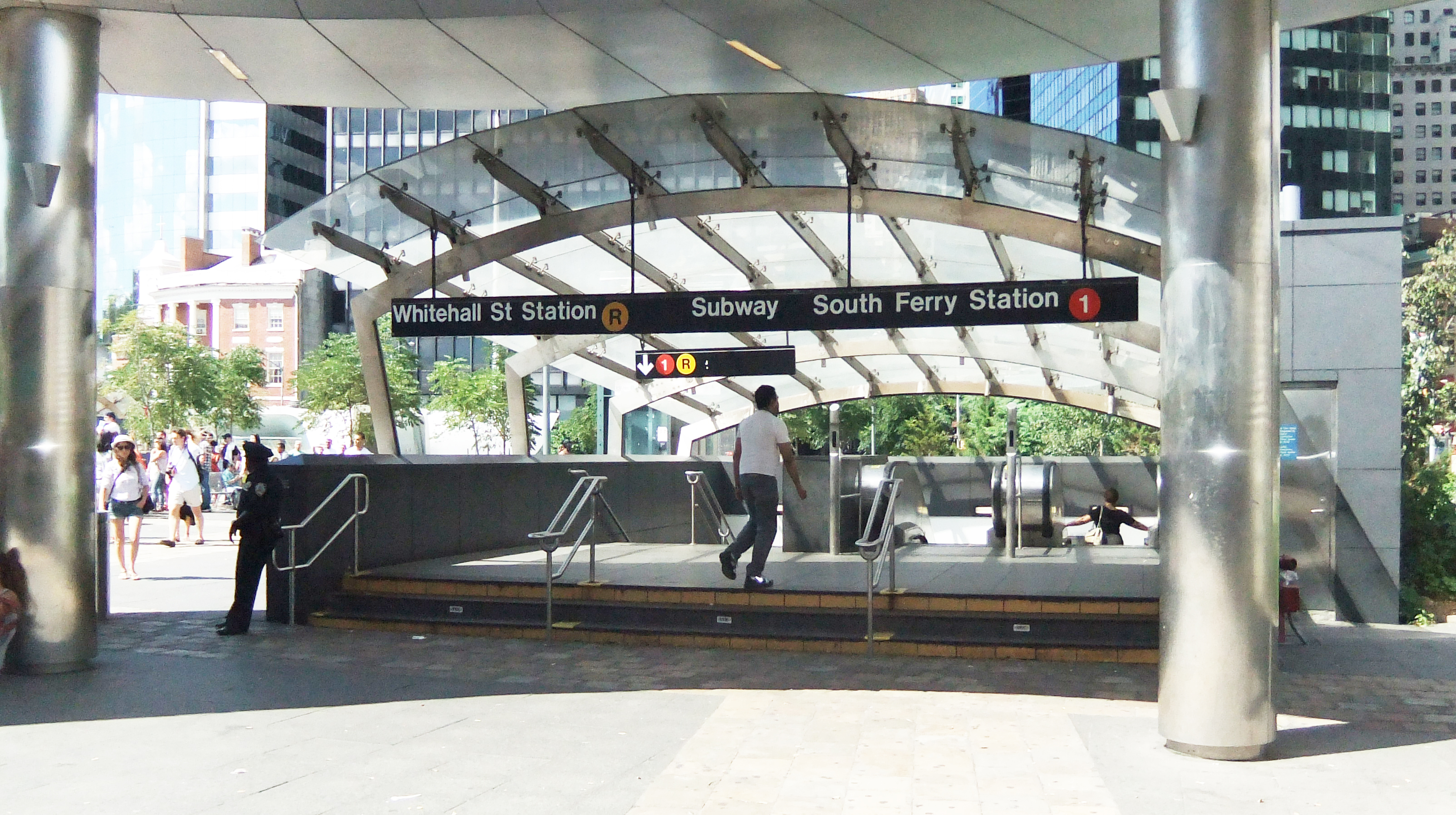
Entrance to the South Ferry/Whitehall Street subway station at Peter Minuit Plaza

South Ferry is at the southern tip of Manhattan in New York City and is the embarkation point for ferries to Staten Island (Staten Island Ferry, through the Staten Island Ferry Whitehall Terminal) and Governors Island. Battery Park, abutting South Ferry on the west, has docking areas for ferries to Liberty Island and Ellis Island. Its name is derived from the more southerly route of service of the historical South Ferry Company in comparison to the Fulton Ferry.

== History ==
The name "South Ferry" derives from a more southerly route of service than previous ferry lines between what were then the separate cities of New York and Brooklyn, rather than from being at the southern tip of Manhattan.

The "Old Ferry" (later renamed the Fulton Ferry), crossed between Manhattan and Brooklyn from streets that in each city would eventually be renamed "Fulton Street". The "New Ferry" (also called the Catherine Ferry) crossed on a more northerly route than the Old Ferry, between Catherine Street in Manhattan, and Main Street in Brooklyn.

As the City of Brooklyn grew, the area south of Atlantic Avenue, known as South Brooklyn, began to become developed, but the area lacked easy access to the ferry terminals in the northern parts of that city. Calls for a new ferry on a more southerly route were first brought up before the New York City Council in 1825, the proposal being commonly known as the "New South Ferry" since 1826, but progress stalled until the issue was taken up by the City of Brooklyn in 1833. The South Ferry Company established the South Ferry on May 16, 1836 to connect Lower Manhattan to the foot of Atlantic Avenue in Brooklyn and the month-old Brooklyn and Jamaica Railroad (renamed Atlantic Avenue Railroad, later the Atlantic Avenue Railroad's streetcar line, later still part of the South Side Railroad of Long Island, now the Atlantic Branch of the Long Island Rail Road) through the Cobble Hill Tunnel. "South Ferry" was also the name of the Brooklyn landing and ferry house. In the 20th and early 21st centuries, the Brooklyn landing site served cargo as Brooklyn Piers 5 and 6, now part of Brooklyn Bridge Park

The Fulton Ferry Company, which then operated only the Fulton Ferry, merged with the South Ferry Company in 1839 to form the New York and Brooklyn Union Ferry Company.

== Transportation connections ==
South Ferry is served by several New York City Subway stations.

- South Ferry–Whitehall Street, a station complex consisting of three components:
  - New South Ferry on the IRT Broadway–Seventh Avenue Line; serving the 1 train
  - South Ferry loops on the IRT Broadway–Seventh Avenue Line and the IRT Lexington Avenue Line; (there are two platforms, both are closed to passengers; the IRT Broadway–Seventh Avenue Line temporarily reopened to provide replacement service from 2013 to 2017, after the new station was flooded by Hurricane Sandy.)
  - Whitehall Street on the BMT Broadway Line; serving the N, R, and W trains
- Bowling Green on the IRT Lexington Avenue Line; serving the 4 and 5 trains (some Lexington Avenue Line trains stopped at South Ferry until 1977)
- Broad Street on the BMT Nassau Street Line; serving the J and Z trains

Also serving the ferry terminal directly is the M15 Select Bus Service route via a bus loop directly at the front door of the terminal. The M15, M20 and M55 local routes stop on nearby streets.

Starting in 1877, South Ferry also hosted a four-track elevated terminal with access to all Manhattan elevated train lines running up Second, Third, Sixth and Ninth Avenues. The station was closed in 1950 after the cessation of Third Avenue Elevated service.

== See also ==
- Battery Maritime Building
- Battery Park City Ferry Terminal
- Fulton Ferry, Brooklyn
- List of ferries across the East River
- Paulus Hook Ferry Terminal
- Peter Minuit Plaza
- South Ferry, Brooklyn
- Weehawken Port Imperial
- West Midtown Ferry Terminal
