= Hudson Avenue Line (surface) =

The Hudson Avenue Line was a horse car street railway line in Brooklyn, New York City, United States, running mostly along Hudson Avenue in Vinegar Hill, near Downtown Brooklyn. It was short-lived, operating only from 1867 to 1871, but its trackage rights over the Brooklyn City Rail Road allowed the Atlantic Avenue Railroad to operate South Ferry-Prospect Park cars for many years.

== History ==
The Hudson Avenue Railroad opened the line in late 1867, from the Hudson Avenue Ferry to Gouverneur Slip in Manhattan south along Hudson Avenue and the Brooklyn City Rail Road's Flatbush Avenue Line trackage on Flatbush Avenue to Ninth Avenue at Prospect Park. The ferry stopped running in early June 1868, and the company asked the Common Council to lay track in John Street and Bridge Street to the Bridge Street Ferry to James Slip in Manhattan.

Consent was given later that month, and the new line was opened by August 18, 1868. However, this did not draw enough traffic from the Bridge Street Ferry to turn a profit, and it shut down for the winter. In mid-1869, the Brooklyn and Jamaica Railway (Atlantic Avenue Line) leased the Hudson Avenue Railroad, in part to use its Brooklyn City Rail Road trackage rights to reach Prospect Park from South Ferry; cars to the Bridge Street Ferry began operating again in August. The track was removed by the city in 1871 to build a sewer, and was never relaid.
