= Hicks Street Line =

Public transit line in Brooklyn, New York

The Hicks Street Line was a public transit line in Brooklyn, New York City, United States, running from the Ninth Avenue Depot at Greenwood Cemetery to the Brooklyn Bridge.

== History ==
When the New York State Legislature chartered the Greenwood and Coney Island Railroad in 1874, its lines included Hicks Street from Hamilton Avenue to Fulton Street near Fulton Ferry. The Atlantic Avenue Railroad acquired the right to build this line through a January 1, 1886, lease of the Prospect Park and Coney Island Railroad's (Culver Line's) horse railroad properties. Construction began on the line in Hicks Street, only built between the 15th Street Line in Hamilton Avenue and the company's trackage in Atlantic Avenue, in November 1888. The line began operations in late May or early June 1889, and ran along the existing 15th Street Line from the Ninth Avenue Depot of the Culver Line, through Ninth Avenue, 15th Street, and Hamilton Avenue, then onto the new trackage on Hicks Street, and along Atlantic Avenue and the Adams Street and Boerum Place Line to the Brooklyn end of the Brooklyn Bridge.
