= South Ferry =

South Ferry may refer to:

- South Ferry (Manhattan), the location at the southern tip of Manhattan where the Staten Island Ferry Whitehall Terminal is located
- South Ferry, Brooklyn, the former ferry landing at the foot of Atlantic Avenue in Brooklyn
- The former ferry between Manhattan and Brooklyn which gave its name to the sites in Manhattan and Brooklyn
- South Ferry/Whitehall Street (New York City Subway), the subway complex at South Ferry, Manhattan
  - South Ferry (IRT Broadway–Seventh Avenue Line), 2009–2012, closed for reconstruction after Hurricane Sandy, reopened 2017 to serve the 1 train
  - Whitehall Street–South Ferry (BMT Broadway Line), serving the N, R, and W trains
  - South Ferry loops (New York City Subway), the former loop subway station at South Ferry, Manhattan
- South Ferry (IRT elevated station), the former elevated station at South Ferry, Manhattan
- South Ferry (Shelter Island), the ferry from North Haven to Shelter Island in New York
