= Ninth Avenue Depot =

Ninth Avenue Depot may refer to:

- Ninth Avenue Depot (Brooklyn), at Ninth Avenue and 20th Street, New York City; end of the Hicks Street Line
- Ninth Avenue Depot (Manhattan) or 54th Street Depot, at Ninth Avenue and 54th Street, New York City; now demolished

== See also ==
- Bus depots of MTA Regional Bus Operations
