= Atlantic Antic =

Annual street festival in Brooklyn, New York

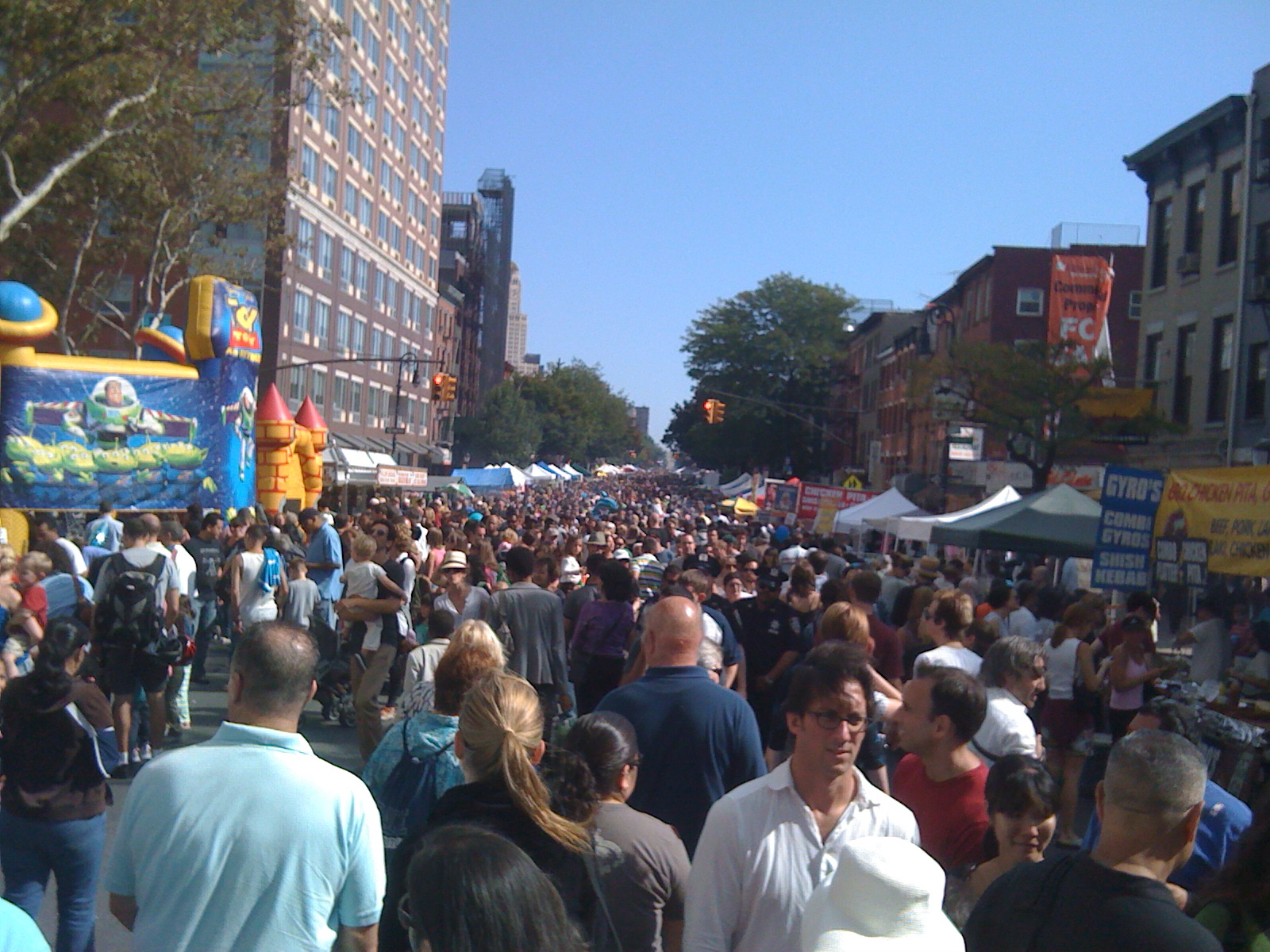
The 2009 Atlantic Antic, at Atlantic Avenue and Smith Street in Brooklyn, New York.

The Atlantic Antic is a street festival held yearly on Atlantic Avenue in Brooklyn, New York between 4th Avenue and Hicks Street. It is run and produced by the Atlantic Avenue Local Development Corporation (AALDC). The festival features food and craft stands, booths representing companies and local nonprofits, live music, and other entertainment. In 2006, some 300 vendors and 300,000 people attended; in 2009, roughly 600 vendors and over a million people were estimated to have attended.

The fair has occurred each fall since 1974, except for 2001, when Mayor Rudy Giuliani canceled all NYC parades and fairs following the September 11 attacks; 2002, when a city policy on street closure prevented the AALDC from holding the fair and 2020 during the COVID-19 pandemic. The fair runs for 10 blocks (over one mile) along Atlantic Avenue in the Brooklyn Heights, Cobble Hill, and Boerum Hill neighborhoods of Brooklyn. The fair is mentioned in the Beastie Boys' 1989 song "Shadrach," from Paul's Boutique: "So I'm out pickin' pockets at the Atlantic Antic/ And nobody wants to hear you 'cause your rhymes are damn frantic."
