= Catherine Ferry =

Catherine Ferry may refer to:

- Catherine Ferry (singer), French singer
- Catharine Ferry, former ferry in New York City, sometimes referred to as Catherine Ferry
