= B65 (New York City bus) =

Bus route in Brooklyn, New York

b65
- Bergen Street Line
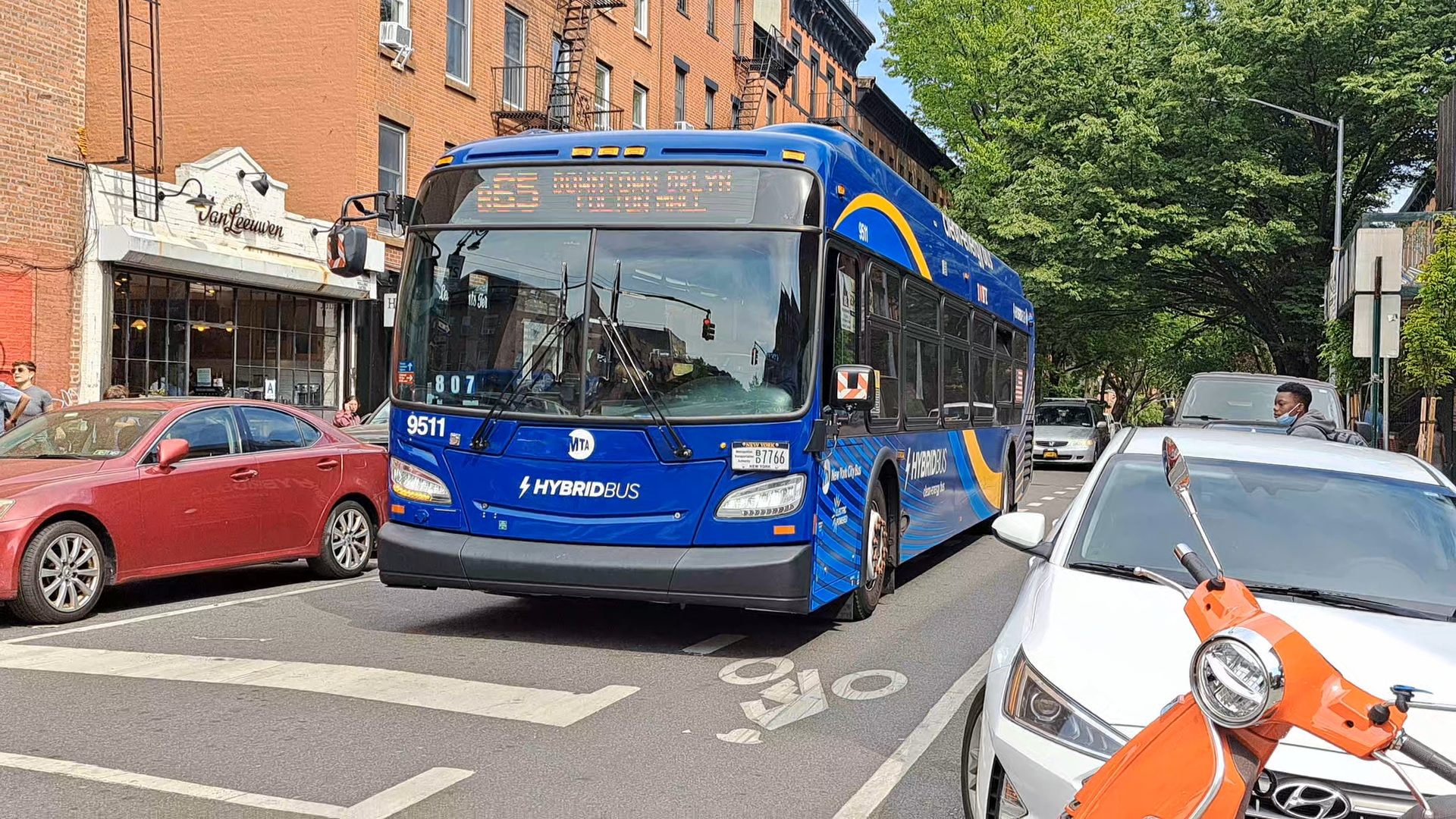
- A 2021 XDE40 (9511) on the B65 to Downtown Brooklyn

Overview
- System: MTA Regional Bus Operations
- Operator: New York City Transit Authority
- Garage: East New York Depot
- Vehicle: New Flyer Xcelsior XD40; New Flyer Xcelsior XDE40; New Flyer Xcelsior XE40; OBI Orion VII NG HEV

Route
- Locale: Brooklyn, New York, U.S.
- Start: Downtown Brooklyn – Fulton Mall/Jay Street–MetroTech station
- Via: Bergen/Dean Streets
- End: Crown Heights – Ralph Avenue
- Length: 3.6 miles (5.8 km)
- Other routes: B45 St. Johns Place

Service
- Operates: All times except late nights
- Annual patronage: 679,325 (2025)
- Transfers: Yes
- Timetable: B65

The Bergen Street Line is a public transit line in Brooklyn, New York City, running westbound mostly along Bergen Street, as well as eastbound on Dean Street (as part of a one-way pair), between Downtown Brooklyn and Ocean Hill (earlier Red Hook to City Line). Originally a streetcar line, it is now the B65 bus route, operated by the New York City Transit Authority. The B65 is based out of the East New York Depot in East New York, Brooklyn.

== Route description ==
The B65 starts at Boerum Place and Joralemon Street. The eastbound route runs down Boerum Place and makes a left at Atlantic Avenue. It runs down Atlantic Avenue to 3rd Avenue and proceeds to make a right turn and run down Third Avenue for two blocks before turning left on Dean Street. The route then proceeds east on Dean Street until it reaches Rochester Avenue and then turns right on Rochester Avenue. The route then takes another left at St. Marks Avenue. It runs down St Marks Avenue until Ralph Avenue where it makes a right turn and runs down Ralph Avenue until St Johns Place, where it terminates along with the B45.

The westbound B65 starts at St Johns Place and runs down St Johns Place for one block and makes a right turn on Buffalo Avenue and runs down Buffalo Avenue until Bergen Street, where it makes a left turn on Bergen Street. It runs down Bergen Street until Smith Street, where it makes a right turn on Smith Street. It then runs up Smith Street until Livingston Street, where it terminates.

== History ==
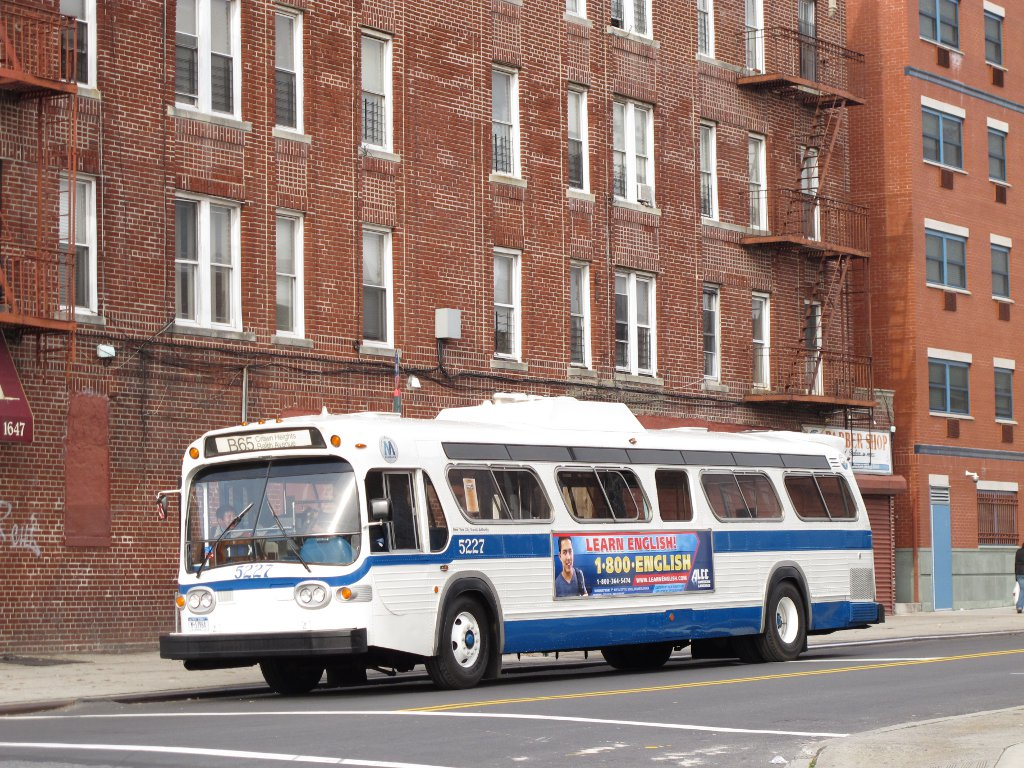
A 1966-1972 GMC “Blitz” (5227) on the B65 lays over at the eastern terminus in Ocean Hill, set for Crown Heights. It is now a museum bus.

The South Brooklyn and Bergen Street Railroad was organized under the general railroad law and opened by 1865 from Hamilton Ferry along Sackett Street (including part of the Brooklyn City Rail Road's Furman Street Line), Hoyt Street, and Bergen Street to Classon Avenue. The Bergen Street Railroad was merged into the Brooklyn and Canarsie Railroad, and on September 21, 1866 an extension to Canarsie Landing (where steamboats connected for Rockaway) along Bergen Street, Nostrand Avenue, Clove Road, Little Lane, and Canarsie's main street (the last three partially gone) was opened. It was the second line to Canarsie, arriving a year after the Brooklyn and Rockaway Beach Railroad, and was a failure, being foreclosed on January 13, 1868. The original portion, west of the stables at Bergen Street and Classon Avenue, was sold on February 14, 1868; the rest was sold on September 15, 1868. None of the extension to Canarsie was ever used again.

The South Brooklyn and Park Railroad acquired the line to Classon Avenue on June 1, 1870, and was again sold on June 19, 1877 as the South Brooklyn Central Railroad. It was authorized in 1878 to build a branch in Bergen Street from Hoyt Street west to Court Street, use the Brooklyn City Railroad trackage in Court Street, and use the Atlantic Avenue Railroad trackage in Atlantic Avenue and Furman Street to the Wall Street Ferry at Montague Street. The Atlantic Avenue Railroad leased the South Brooklyn Central, then extending to Bergen Street and Albany Avenue, on February 2, 1885. The Atlantic Avenue Railroad laid tracks in Boerum Place from Atlantic Avenue south to Bergen Street to connect the lines, as an extension of its Adams Street and Boerum Place Line.

The line reached Rochester Avenue by 1897. Eventually the Bergen Street Line cars turned south on Buffalo Avenue, east on the St. Johns Place Line trackage along St. Johns Place and East New York Avenue, and east along Liberty Avenue to City Line.

At some point, the west end was truncated to the intersection of Smith Street and Sackett Street. Buses were substituted for streetcars on July 20, 1947, and were replaced again by trolley buses between October 17, 1948 and July 27, 1960. The B65 bus has been truncated more, only running from Cobble Hill east to Ocean Hill; the B12 bus, started by the Brooklyn–Manhattan Transit Corporation as a new route in 1931, later covered Liberty Avenue out to City Line until it was truncated to Broadway Junction in 2010.

In the 1990s, the B65 was rerouted from Cobble Hill north to Downtown Brooklyn, terminating at the Fulton Mall.

On December 1, 2022, the MTA released a draft redesign of the Brooklyn bus network. As part of the redesign, B65 service west of Washington Avenue would be rerouted to serve Atlantic Avenue with the B45. B65 would also be shortened to Ralph Avenue and St. Marks Place. Service on Bergen and Dean Streets west of Washington Avenue would be discontinued. Closely spaced stops would also be eliminated.
