= Hudson Avenue Line =

Hudson Avenue Line may refer to either of two rail lines in Brooklyn, New York:

- Hudson Avenue Line (surface), a horse car street railway line running mostly along Hudson Avenue near Downtown Brooklyn, operating only from 1867 to 1871
- Hudson Avenue Line (elevated), a branch of the Fifth Avenue Line (Brooklyn elevated) from the intersection of Hudson and Park Avenues south to the Long Island Rail Road's Flatbush Avenue terminal that operated 1888 to 1904
