= Gouverneur Street Ferry =

Former ferry in Manhattan and Brooklyn, New York

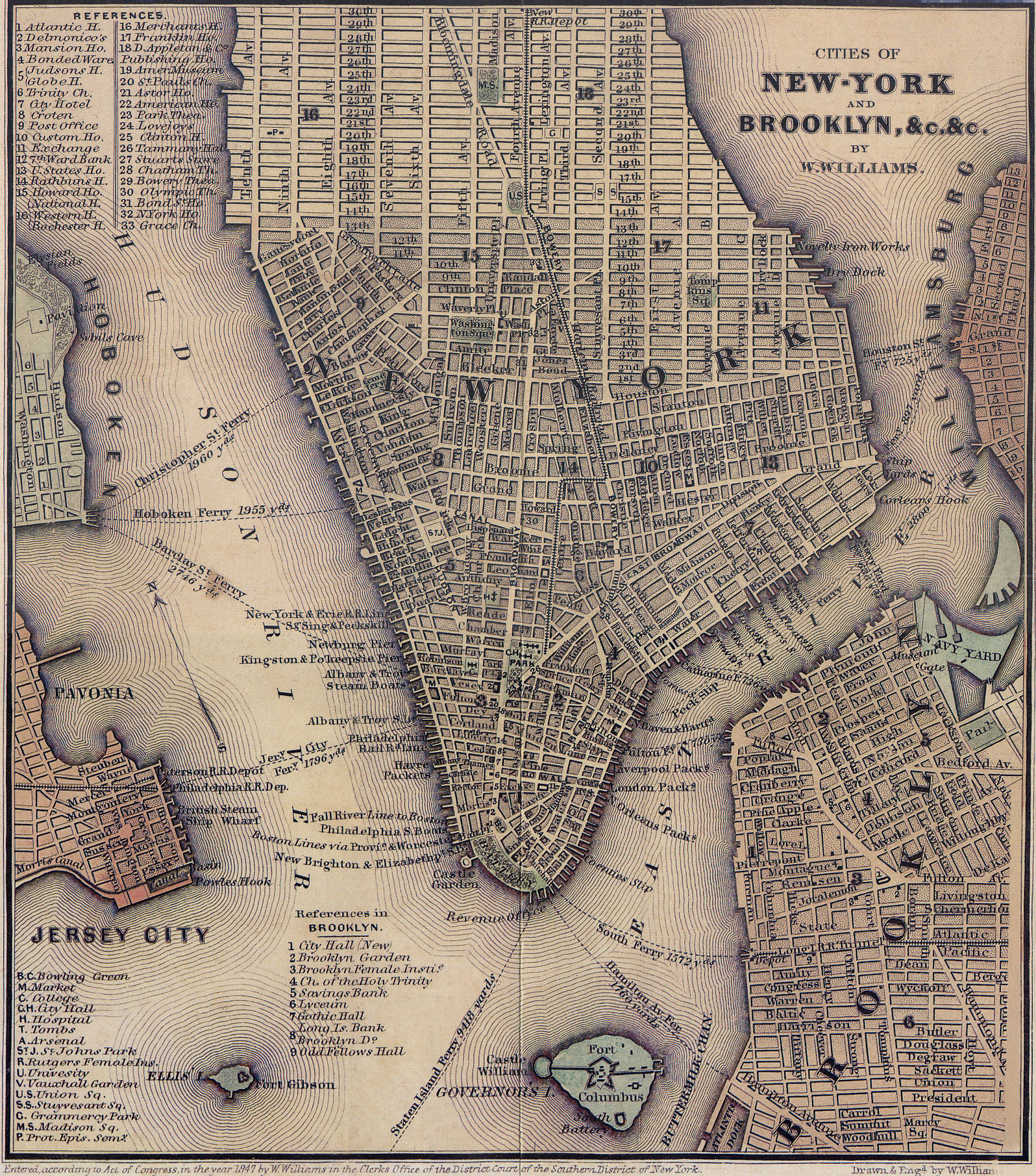
Map from 1847 showing the route of what was then the Navy Yard Ferry

The Gouverneur Street Ferry was a ferry route connecting Manhattan, New York City, with the city of Brooklyn, by joining Manhattan's Gouverneur Street to Brooklyn's Bridge Street across the East River.

== History ==
The ferry, originally the Walnut Street Ferry and later the Jackson Street Ferry or Hudson Avenue Ferry, was established on December 1, 1817. The route originally connected Manhattan's Walnut Street (now called Jackson Street, just west of Corlear's Hook) with Brooklyn's Little Street (later named Jackson Street, just east of today's Hudson Avenue and west of the Brooklyn Navy Yard). At some point, the Manhattan landing was moved two blocks west, to Gouverneur Street, driving the name change to Gouverneur Street Ferry.

Smith & Bulkley gained control by May 1852, and, effective May 23, 1853, the Brooklyn side was moved two blocks west, from Hudson Avenue to Bridge Street. Being unable to compete with the one-cent fare adopted by the Brooklyn Union Ferry Company in November 1850, it was sold to the new Union Ferry Company of Brooklyn (the successor to the Brooklyn Union) in December 1853. The lease expired on September 12, 1856, but the company continued to operate the ferry. They petitioned the City of New York to abandon the Roosevelt Street Ferry, in exchange for continuing Gouverneur Street operations and expanding the Manhattan landing. The city refused, and operations ended in January 1857.

A new ferry, known as the Navy Yard Ferry or Hudson Avenue Ferry, was established on July 8, 1859 between Jackson Street in Manhattan and Hudson Avenue in Brooklyn, almost exactly where the original Walnut Street Ferry ran in 1817. The Hudson Avenue Railroad opened a streetcar line from the ferry to Prospect Park in late 1867. The ferry shut down in early June 1868, leading the railroad to move its line to the Bridge Street Ferry.
