= 23rd Street Ferry =

23rd Street Ferry may refer to:

- 23rd Street Ferry (Exchange Place), connecting West 23rd Street, Manhattan with Exchange Place, Jersey City (Pennsylvania Railroad) across the Hudson River
- 23rd Street Ferry (Williamsburg), connecting East 23rd Street, Manhattan with Broadway, Williamsburg across the East River
- 23rd Street Ferry (Greenpoint), connecting East 23rd Street, Manhattan with Greenpoint Avenue, Greenpoint across the East River
- Pavonia Ferry, connecting West 23rd and Pavonia Terminal (Erie Railroad), Jersey City
