= Broadway Ferry =

Ferry landing in Brooklyn, New York

Coordinates: 40°42′40″N 73°58′10″W

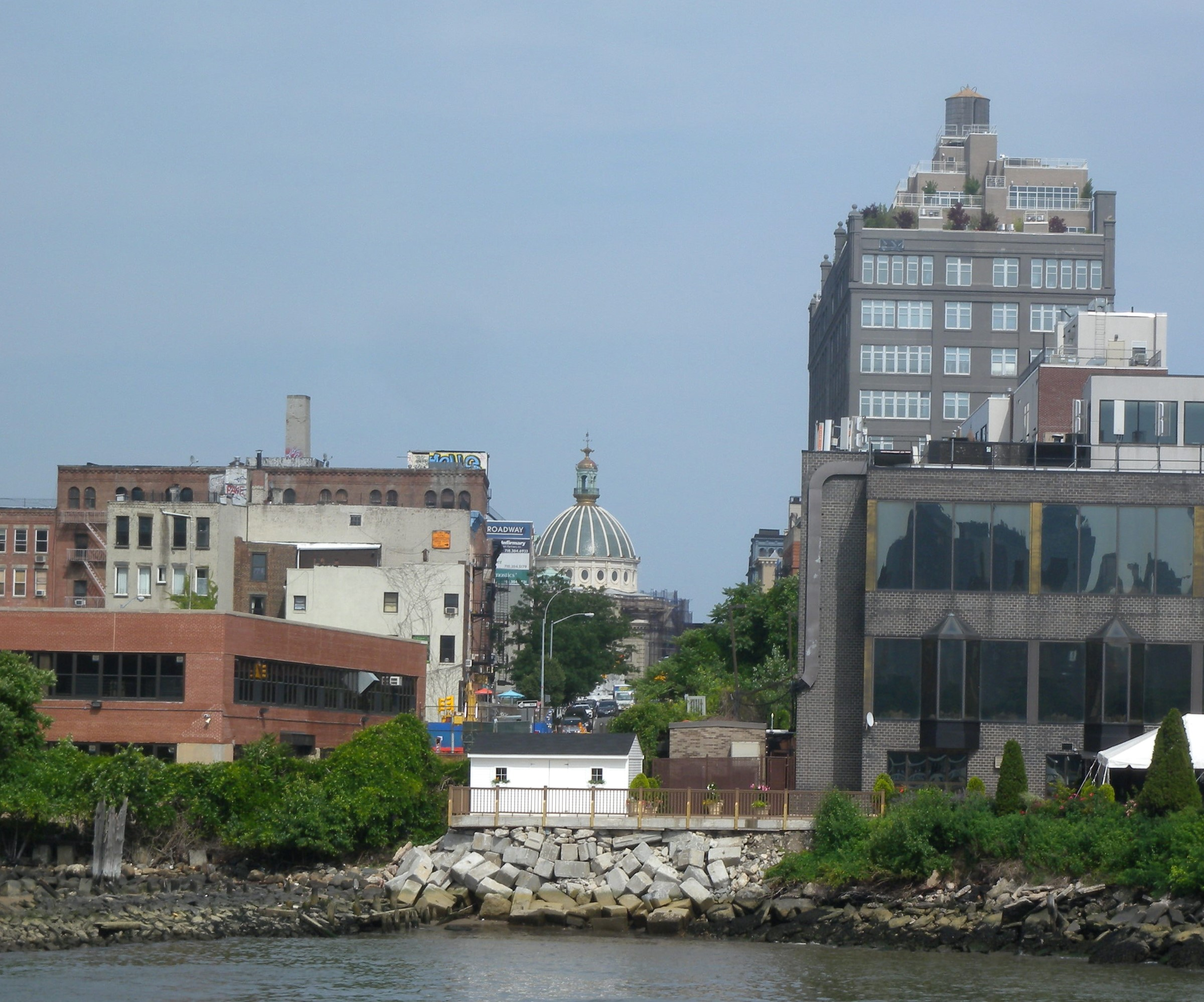
Site in 2011

Broadway Ferry was a ferry landing in Williamsburg, Brooklyn, New York City, United States at the foot of Broadway. Boats connected it to the Grand Street Ferry, East 23rd Street Ferry, and James Slip landings in Manhattan. In Brooklyn, the Broadway El ended at the ferry.

== See also ==
- List of ferries across the East River
- NY Waterway
