= Roosevelt Street =

Street in Manhattan, New York

Coordinates: 40°42′39″N 73°59′58″W

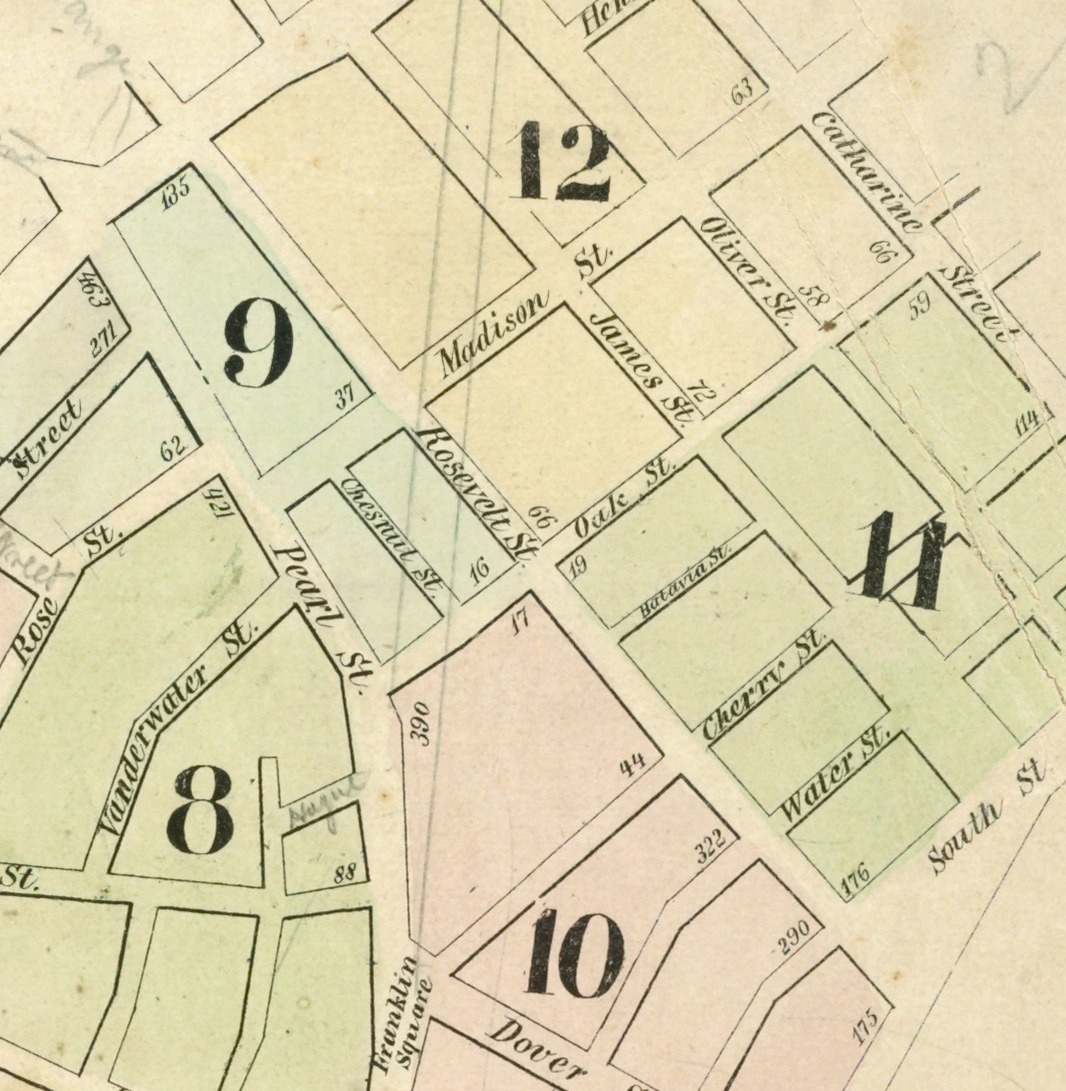
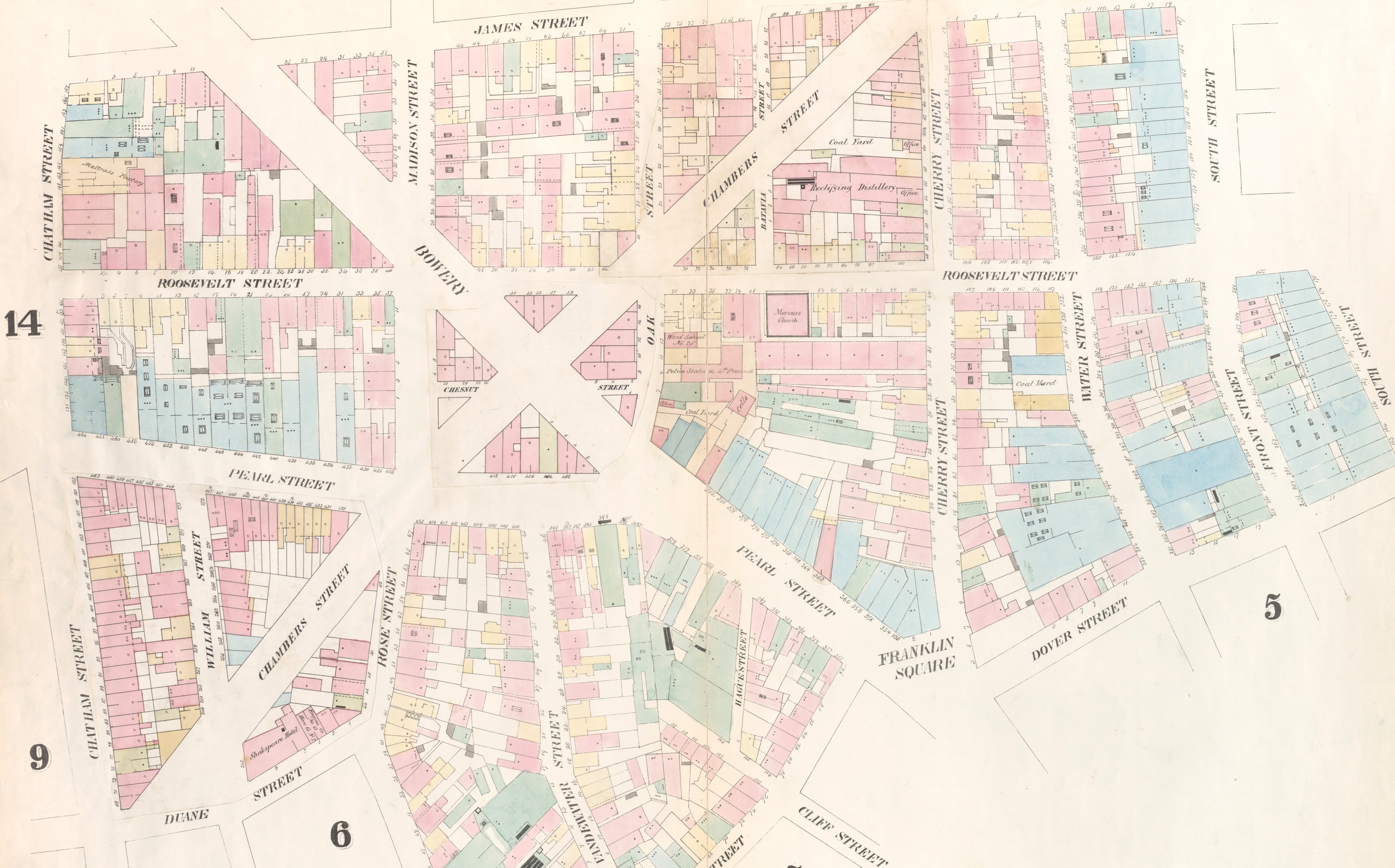
Left, 1855, with Chatham Street (Park Row) at top left, parallel to Madison Street. Right, 1857, after the creation of New Bowery (now called St. James Place) and New Chambers Street (since eliminated); Chatham Street runs along left edge.

Roosevelt Street was a street located in the Two Bridges district of Lower Manhattan, which existed from the British colonial period up until the early 1950s, running from Pearl Street at Park Row (Chatham Street) southeast to South Street. It ran parallel to James Street, one block west. The western end of Roosevelt Street later became the walkway from Park Row to the front entrance of the Chatham Green Apartments at 165 Park Row.

== History ==
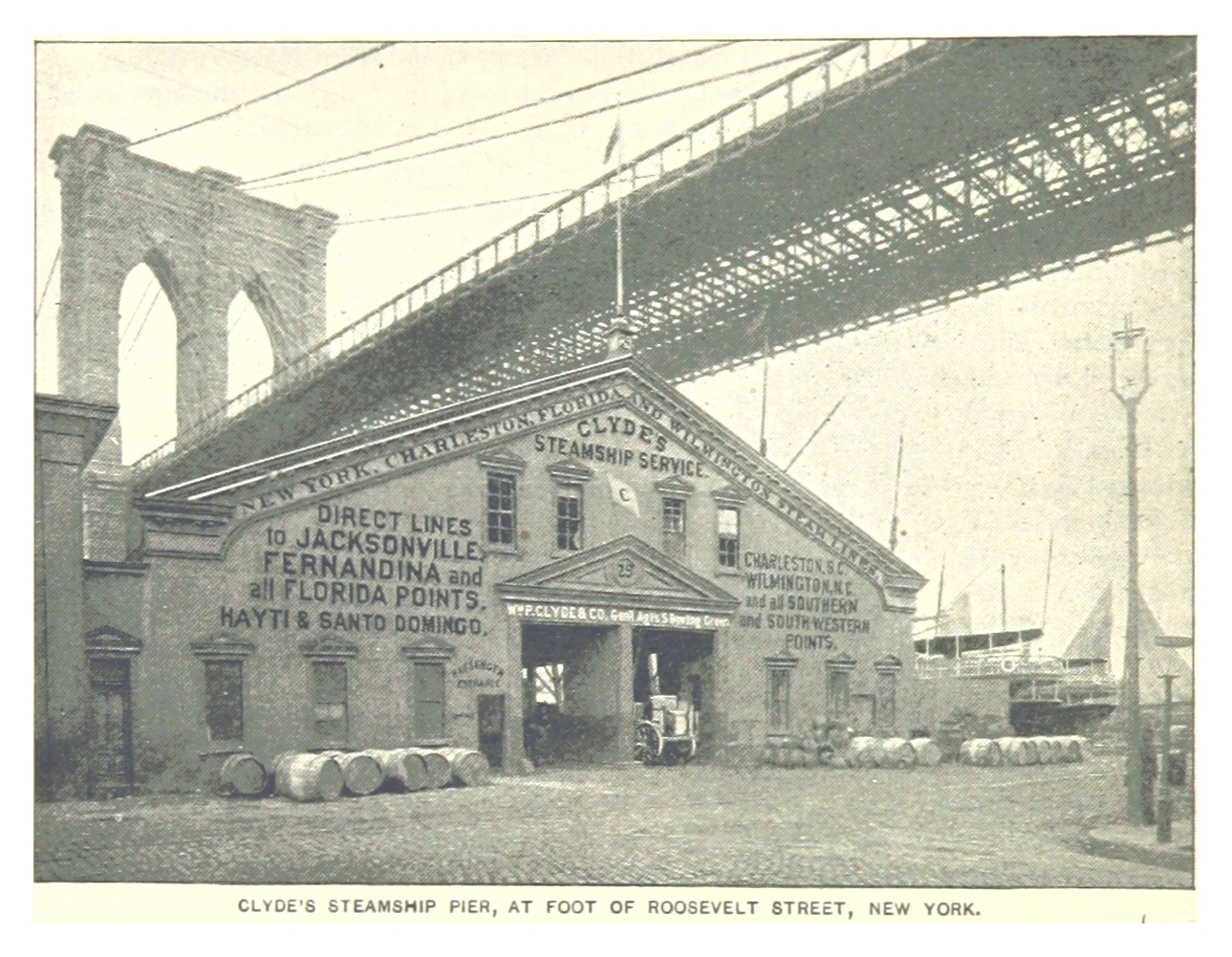
Clyde's Steamship Pier, at the foot of Roosevelt Street (1893)

Roosevelt Street was named after a Roosevelt who owned property in the area from the time of Dutch settlement of New Amsterdam. It was not named after either president of the United States with the same surname, Teddy Roosevelt or Franklin Roosevelt.

The street is historically significant as the place where the mob of the New York City draft riots – a violent protest against conscription for the American Civil War – assembled before heading uptown to the draft offices.

The Roosevelt Street Ferry was displaced by the construction of the New York (north) tower of the Brooklyn Bridge. Later on, the rest of the street, along with many of its surrounding streets and lanes, were eliminated by the construction of the Alfred E. Smith Houses, a public housing project, in the 1950s.
