= Union Ferry Company =

The Union Ferry Company of Brooklyn, commonly known as the Union Ferry Company, was a ferry company operating routes across the East River between Manhattan and Brooklyn, New York City, United States.

== History ==
The New York and Brooklyn Union Ferry Company was organized in 1839, and leased the Fulton Ferry Company and South Ferry Company. It was reorganized in 1844 as the Brooklyn Union Ferry Company, and leased the Hamilton Avenue Ferry in 1851.

The creation of the Union Ferry Company of Brooklyn was authorized by the New York State Legislature on April 9, 1853, and on November 10, 1854 it was formed to replace the Brooklyn Union. It consolidated with the operating companies of four other ferries: the Roosevelt Street Ferry from the Roosevelt Ferry Company, the Gouverneur Street Ferry and Catherine Ferry from Smith & Bulkley, and the Wall Street Ferry from J. Sharp & Co.

== Decline ==
The ferry's decline came about in the early 20th century with the opening of fixed crossings spanning the East River. The Catherine and Wall Street ferries were the first to go, in 1912. The Fulton, Atlantic Avenue, and Hamilton Avenue ferries were turned into city ferries in 1922. The Fulton Ferry was defunct by 1924, but the Atlantic Avenue ferry lasted until 1933 and the Hamilton Avenue ferry ceased operation in 1942.
