= Roosevelt Street Ferry =

Former ferry in Manhattan and Brooklyn, New York

The Roosevelt Street Ferry was a ferry route connecting Manhattan and Williamsburg, Brooklyn, New York City, United States, joining Roosevelt Street (Manhattan) and Broadway (Brooklyn) across the East River.

== History ==
The ferry was established on April 30, 1853, between Roosevelt Street and Bridge Street in Downtown Brooklyn. Being unable to compete with the one-cent fare adopted by the Brooklyn Union Ferry Company in November 1850, it was sold to the new Union Ferry Company of Brooklyn (the successor to the Brooklyn Union) in December 1853.

George Law's Brooklyn Ferry Company introduced a ferry between James Slip and South Tenth Street in Williamsburg on May 4, 1857. Effective March 28, 1859, the Brooklyn landing of the ferry was moved from South Tenth Street to Broadway, where the company's Division Avenue Ferry landed.

The Union Ferry Company stopped running the Roosevelt Street-Bridge Street route in 1859, and sold the Roosevelt Slip to the Brooklyn Ferry Company, which moved its Broadway-James Slip ferry to Roosevelt later that year. In early 1860, the Brooklyn Ferry Company and the Long Island Ferry Company (Peck Slip Ferry) agreed to consolidate operations, and the Peck Slip route was abandoned in late 1860.

== See also ==
- List of ferries across the East River
