= Cyrus P. Smith =

Mayor of Brooklyn

Cyrus Porter Smith

4th Mayor of Brooklyn
- In office 1839–1842
- Preceded by: Jeremiah Johnson
- Succeeded by: Henry C. Murphy

New York State Senator
- In office 1856–1858

Personal details
- Born: April 5, 1800 Hanover, New Hampshire, US
- Died: February 13, 1877 (aged 76)
- Party: Whig
- Spouse: Lydia Lewis Hooker

Cyrus Porter Smith (1800–1877) was an American politician. He was the mayor of Brooklyn from 1839 to 1842.

== Early life ==
He was born on a farm in Hanover, New Hampshire, and worked his way through Dartmouth College. After reading law in Connecticut, he moved to Brooklyn in 1827. Arriving in the city with few contacts and resources, he gained notice through active involvement in the 1828 presidential campaign and as choir-master of the First Presbyterian Church.

== Brooklyn civics ==
Smith held positions as clerk of Brooklyn's Board of Trustees and then on the Corporation Counsel.

In 1839 he was chosen by the Board of Trustees to be Mayor. He became Brooklyn's first elected mayor in 1840. He was defeated by Democrat Henry C. Murphy in 1842.

Smith later served as a state senator. He was also involved in other civic duties, serving for thirty years as a member of the Board of Education, and as a founder of both Green-Wood Cemetery (his final resting place) and Brooklyn City Hospital.

== Smith & Bulkley ==
After leaving public office, Smith teamed with business partner William F. Bulkley to form Smith & Bulkley. Smith served as president of the company, with numerous railroad and ferry concerns in Brooklyn, including the Catherine Ferry and the Gouverneur Street Ferry.

== Family ==
One of his granddaughters was the illustrator Pamela Colman Smith.
