= Peck Slip Ferry =

19th-century ferry route in New York

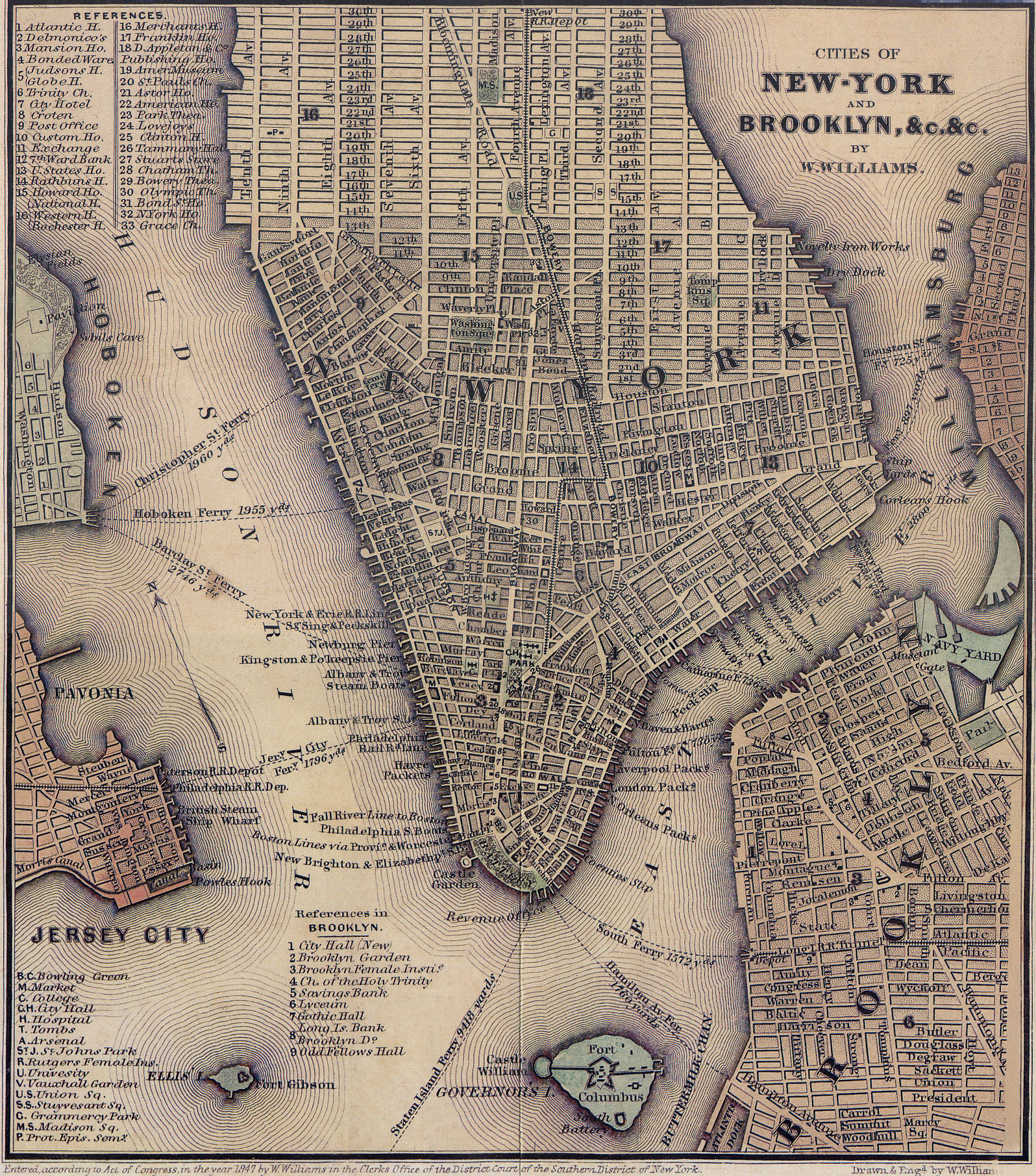
Map from 1847 showing the route of the Peck Slip Ferry

The Peck Slip Ferry was a pre-Brooklyn Bridge ferry route connecting Manhattan in New York City and Williamsburg in the then-separate city of Brooklyn, New York, United States, joining Peck Slip (Manhattan) and Broadway (Brooklyn) across the East River.

== History ==
The Peck Slip Ferry began operations in 1836, supplementing the Grand Street Ferry. The Manhattan ferry port was located along the east side of the former Old Fulton Fish Market building within the South Street Seaport.

== See also ==
- List of ferries across the East River
