= Bridge Street Ferry =

Former ferry in Manhattan and Brooklyn, New York

The Bridge Street Ferry was a ferry route connecting Manhattan and Williamsburg, Brooklyn, New York City, United States, joining James Slip (Manhattan) and Bridge Street (Brooklyn) across the East River.

== History ==
The ferry was established by the Brooklyn Ferry Company on July 1, 1864, running over a similar route to the old Roosevelt Street Ferry, which ran to Bridge Street until 1859. The route was discontinued in early 1874, due to the failure of a bill to improve Bridge Street.

Today, the site of the Bridge Street Ferry Pier is within a Con Ed substation. The site of the James Slip Ferry Pier is in the Alfred E. Smith Houses a NYCHA housing complex next to the Brooklyn Bridge.

== See also ==
- List of ferries across the East River
