= South Ferry, Brooklyn =

Former ferry landing in Brooklyn, New York

Coordinates: 40°41′31.6″N 74°0′4.2″W

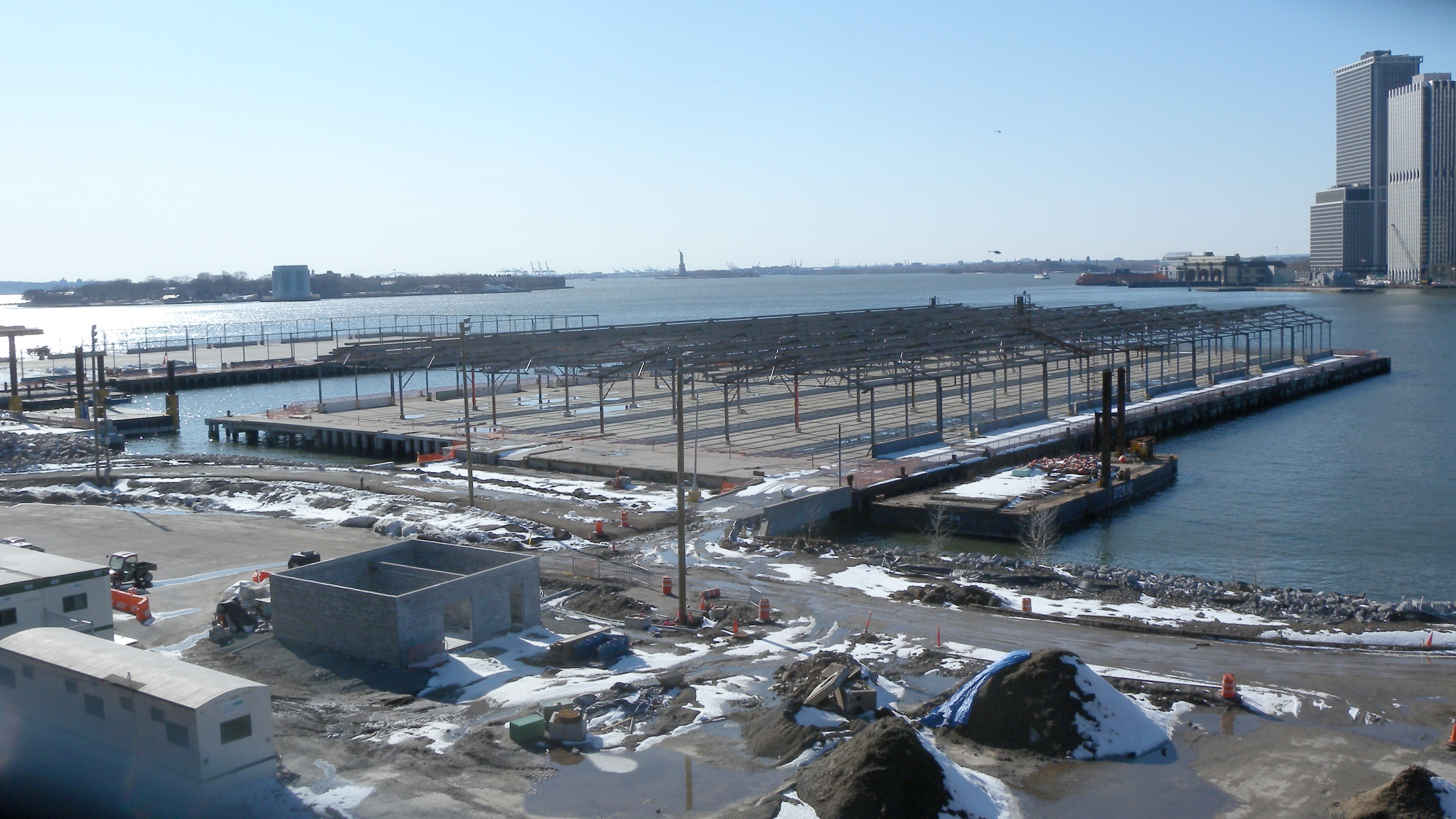
Piers 5 and 6, recently removed from shipping service

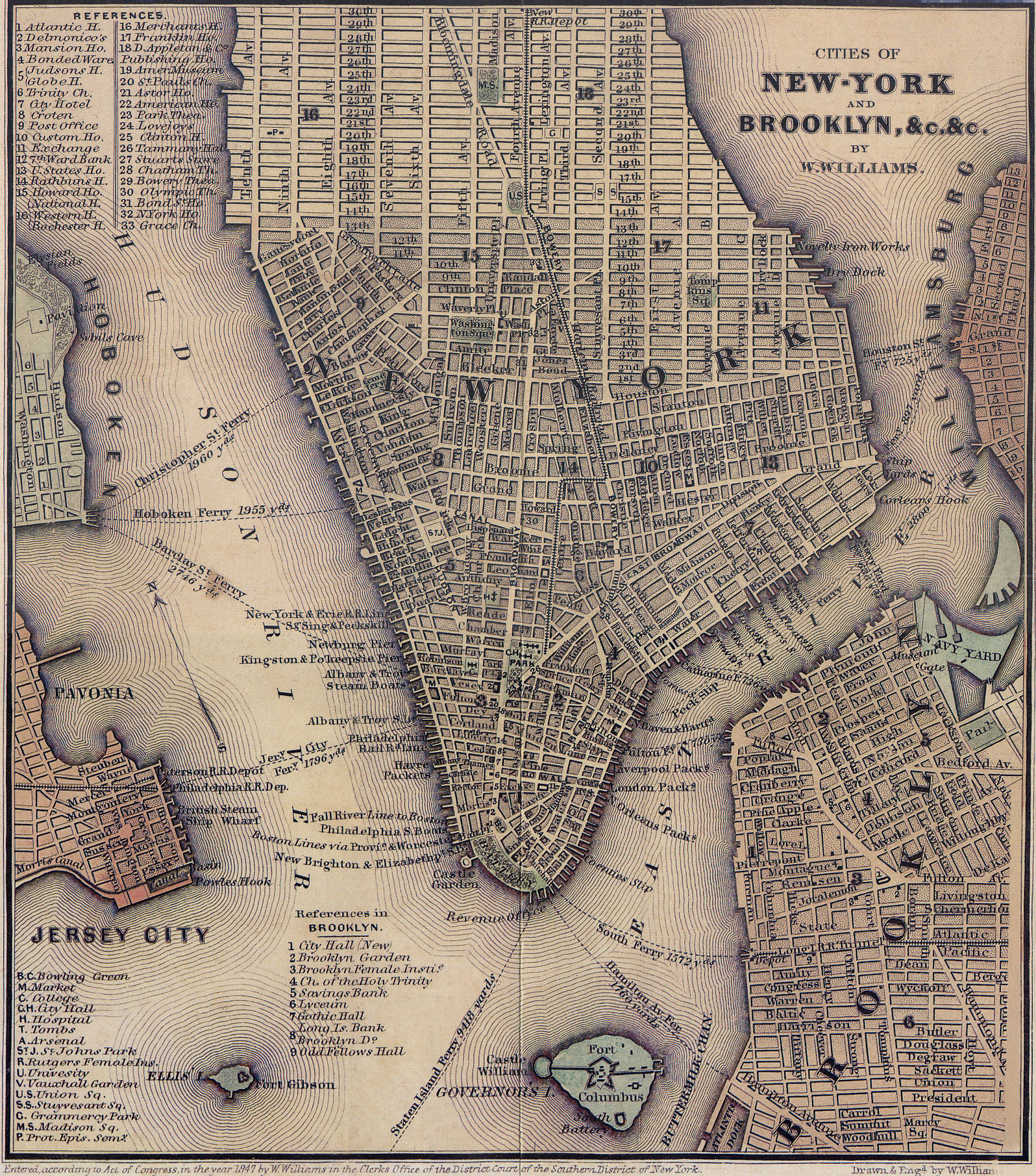
Map from 1847 showing the route of the South Ferry, second route northeast of Governors Island.

South Ferry was a ferry landing on the Brooklyn side of the East River, at the foot of Atlantic Avenue below the Brooklyn Heights neighborhood. It is now Piers 5 and 6 in Brooklyn Bridge Park.

== History ==
The name "South Ferry" does not derive from serving the southern tip of Manhattan and what was then known as "South Brooklyn", it was the name of one of the ferries between what were then the separate cities of New York and Brooklyn. The "Old Ferry", which later was renamed the "Fulton Ferry", crossed between Manhattan and Brooklyn from streets that in each city would eventually be renamed "Fulton Street". The "New Ferry" crossed further east, between Catherine Street in Manhattan, and Main Street in Brooklyn.

As the City of Brooklyn grew, the area south of Atlantic Avenue (known as "South Brooklyn") began to become built-up, but lacked easy access to the ferry terminals in the northern parts of the city of Brooklyn. Thus, the South Ferry Company established the South Ferry on May 16, 1836, to connect Lower Manhattan to the foot of Atlantic Avenue in Brooklyn and the month-old Brooklyn and Jamaica Railroad – later the Atlantic Avenue Railroad's streetcar line, and later still part of the Long Island Rail Road, now called the Atlantic Branch – through the Cobble Hill Tunnel. "South Ferry" is still the name of the area of lower Manhattan where the ferry's landing was, and was also the name of the Brooklyn landing and ferry house, although the name is no longer in use.

The Fulton Ferry Company, which then operated only the Fulton Ferry, merged with the South Ferry Company in 1839 to form the New York and Brooklyn Union Ferry Company.

In the 20th and early 21st centuries, the site served cargo as Brooklyn Piers 5 and 6, which are now part of Brooklyn Bridge Park.

== See also ==
- Battery Maritime Building
- South Ferry (Manhattan)
- List of ferries across the East River
