= James Slip Ferry =

Former ferry in Manhattan and Queens, New York

- Locale: New York City
- Waterway: East River
- Transit type: Passenger ferry
- Began operation: May 1861
- Ended operation: October 1, 1907

The James Slip Ferry was a ferry route connecting Lower Manhattan and Long Island City, Queens, New York City, United States, joining James Slip (Manhattan) and Hunter's Point (Queens) across the East River.

== History ==
The ferry was established in or about May 1861, when the Long Island Rail Road was rerouted to Hunterspoint Avenue. It was discontinued on October 1, 1907.

== See also ==
- List of ferries across the East River
- History of the Long Island Rail Road
