= Catharine Ferry =

Ferry route between Manhattan and Brooklyn, United States

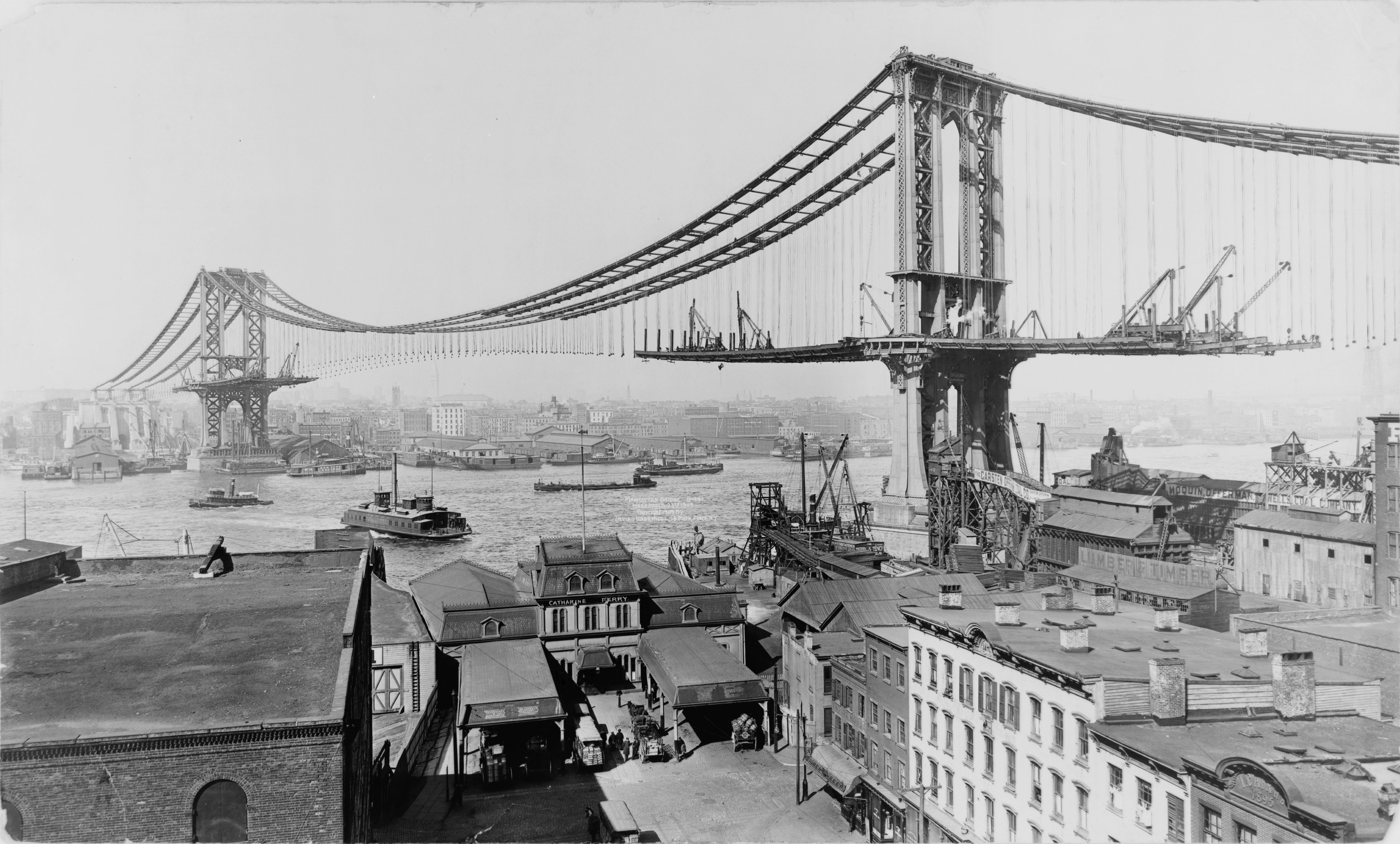
Manhattan Bridge, 1909, dwarfing the Catharine Ferry building at the end of Main Street, Brooklyn

The Catharine Ferry was a ferry route connecting Manhattan and Brooklyn in the United States, joining Catherine Street (or, then, Catharine Street, as seen on the name of the terminal building), in Manhattan and Main Street in Brooklyn across the East River.

The ferry, originally known as the New Ferry, was established on August 1, 1795 to supplement the Fulton Ferry (Old Ferry). It eventually passed into the hands of Samuel Bowne, who sold it to Smith & Bulkley on March 24, 1852. Being unable to compete with the one-cent fare adopted by the Brooklyn Union Ferry Company in November 1850, it was sold to the new Union Ferry Company of Brooklyn (the successor to the Brooklyn Union) in December 1853. For many years thereafter, it was a busy ferry service between the Catharine Ferry Terminal at the foot of Main Street, Brooklyn, and Catharine Street in downtown New York. Finally, after the Brooklyn Bridge, Manhattan Bridge, and Williamsburg Bridge, as well as the BMT and IRT subway tunnels, had siphoned off its passengers, the Catharine Ferry shut down in 1912.
