= Fulton Ferry (ferry) =

Former ferry in Manhattan and Brooklyn, New York

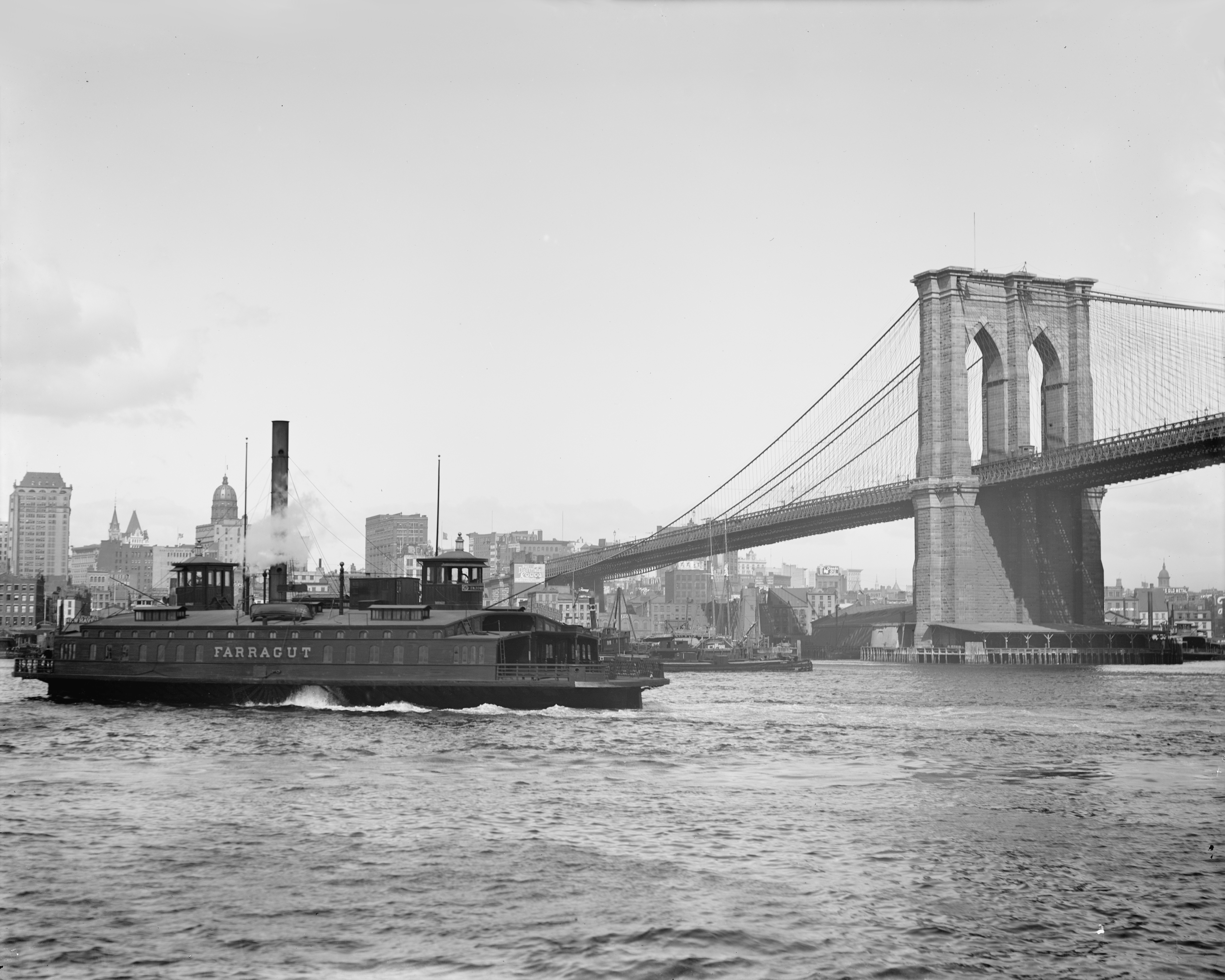
The Union Ferry Company's ferryboat Farragut on the Fulton Ferry route, ca. 1900

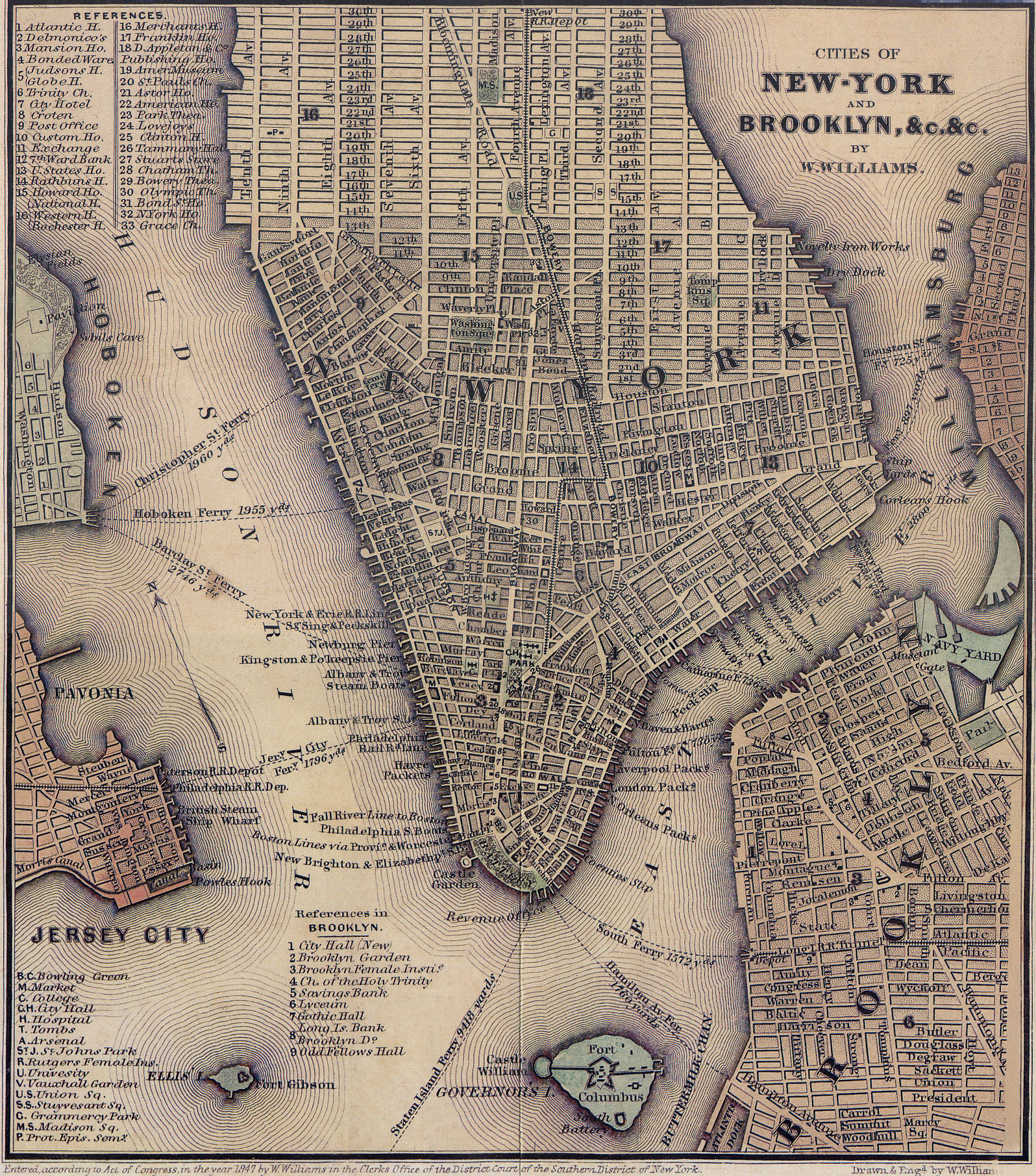
Map from 1847 showing the route of the Fulton Ferry.

The Fulton Ferry was the first steam ferry route connecting Manhattan and Brooklyn, New York City, United States, joining Fulton Street, Manhattan, and Fulton Street, Brooklyn, across the East River. It revolutionized travel between the then City of New York on Manhattan Island and the Village of Brooklyn and the rest of Long Island. Robert Fulton's steam Fulton Ferry Company in 1814 established his name on the ferry service. After the Brooklyn Bridge was built, ridership declined, and the ferry ceased operation on January 19, 1924. NYC Ferry now serves a very similar route.

== Colonial era ==
The first grant for a commercial ferry was given by Dutch governor Willem Kieft to Cornelis Dircksen in 1642; however, local waterfront land-owners were free to make their own crossings of the river. A ferry connecting Broad Street in what was then New Amsterdam with Joralemon Street in what was then Breukelen was started in the 1630s by lone ferryman Cornelis Dircksen. It was later moved to Maiden Lane and Ferry Road, soon to be called Fulton Street.

The ferry played a large role in cementing the Manhattan-Brooklyn rivalry. Two charters – the first in 1686, the second in 1708 – gave to Manhattan ownership of the lines and essentially all of the Brooklyn waterfront. In 1745, Hendrick Remsen brought a lawsuit against New York; after thirty years, the Supreme Court ruled in his favor, awarding him his original five shillings plus court costs of nearly 2,375 shillings (475 times his original request). The city appealed to the crown, but America's declaration of independence threw the case into legal limbo, allowing the City of New York to retain its claim to the Brooklyn waterfront.

The site was known as "Brookland Ferry" when George Washington escaped with his troops after the Battle of Long Island. After the Revolutionary War, ferrymaster Adolph Waldron gained sole control of the ferry by virtue of being the only Whig with a claim to it. He experimented with barges with little success, although his hold on the ferry was very profitable for him. The City refused to renew his lease in 1789, opting instead for a second major charter in 1795, establishing the Catherine Ferry (or, popularly, the “New” Ferry), a stock-based company.

== Steam ferry service ==
Robert Fulton, at the behest of Brooklyn magnate Hezekiah Pierrepont, secured a 25-year lease on the ferry in 1814. The first trip of the steamboat Nassau was made on May 10, 1814, and brought with it the first predictable passage between Brooklyn and Manhattan. Trips took no longer than twelve minutes, and there was no chance of the ship being swept upstream or downstream, or held to the whims of the wind. Brooklyn Heights became known as "America's First Suburb" as residents could commute to Manhattan with ease.

On January 24, 1814, the Fulton Ferry Company, founded by Robert Fulton and William Cutting, obtained a lease on the route from the City of New York. The company introduced steamboat service to the route with the Nassau on May 8, 1814 (the first steam ferry service on the East River), and moved the Manhattan landing to Fulton Street that year. The ferry, which had been known popularly as the Old Ferry since 1795, when the Catherine Ferry (New Ferry) was introduced, became known as the Fulton Ferry, and the streets on either side were later renamed in turn. The Fulton Ferry Company and the South Ferry Company merged in 1839 to form the New York and Brooklyn Union Ferry Company.

The shareholders of the Union Ferry Company were mostly based in Manhattan; they tended to favor increased profits over improved service. (The stock paid a generous 7% dividend.) Fares started at four cents, which led to rival services at Red Hook and elsewhere. Union Ferry reduced its fare to one cent in stages between 1842 and 1850, bankrupting the competing lines and allowing Union Ferry to purchase their rights and raise rates once again. American poet Walt Whitman frequently used the Fulton Ferry and was inspired by the experiences to write "Sun-Down Poem"in 1856, later renamed "Crossing Brooklyn Ferry".

The original Fulton Ferry route continued to be successful until the 1883 opening of the Brooklyn Bridge crossing at almost the same point. Even after the bridge opened it continued to be well-patronized for many years; the Fulton Street Elevated Line terminated at the Brooklyn ferry landing when it opened in 1888 (and only began running some trains across the Brooklyn Bridge instead after 1898), and ferries were also preferred by animal-hauled wagons and carts that had difficulty climbing the relatively steep bridge approaches. With the opening of additional bridges and subway crossings of the river and the decline of animal traffic, patronage fell further. The ferry finally ceased operations in 1924; some other East River routes that had been part of the Union Ferry Company lasted until 1942.

== Similar modern ferry services ==
Ferry service from the Brooklyn Fulton Ferry Landing to Manhattan returned in 2002, with service by New York Water Taxi, though with the Manhattan terminal at Wall Street rather than Fulton Street. Service became more frequent and regular in June 2011 when the route was taken over by New York Waterway as part of a longer route calling at six slips in Brooklyn and Queens as well as the Manhattan East Side terminals. In 2017, this service became part of the NYC Ferry system's East River route.
