= Atlantic Avenue Railroad =

Former railroad company in New York, US

Map of the Brooklyn and Jamaica Railroad

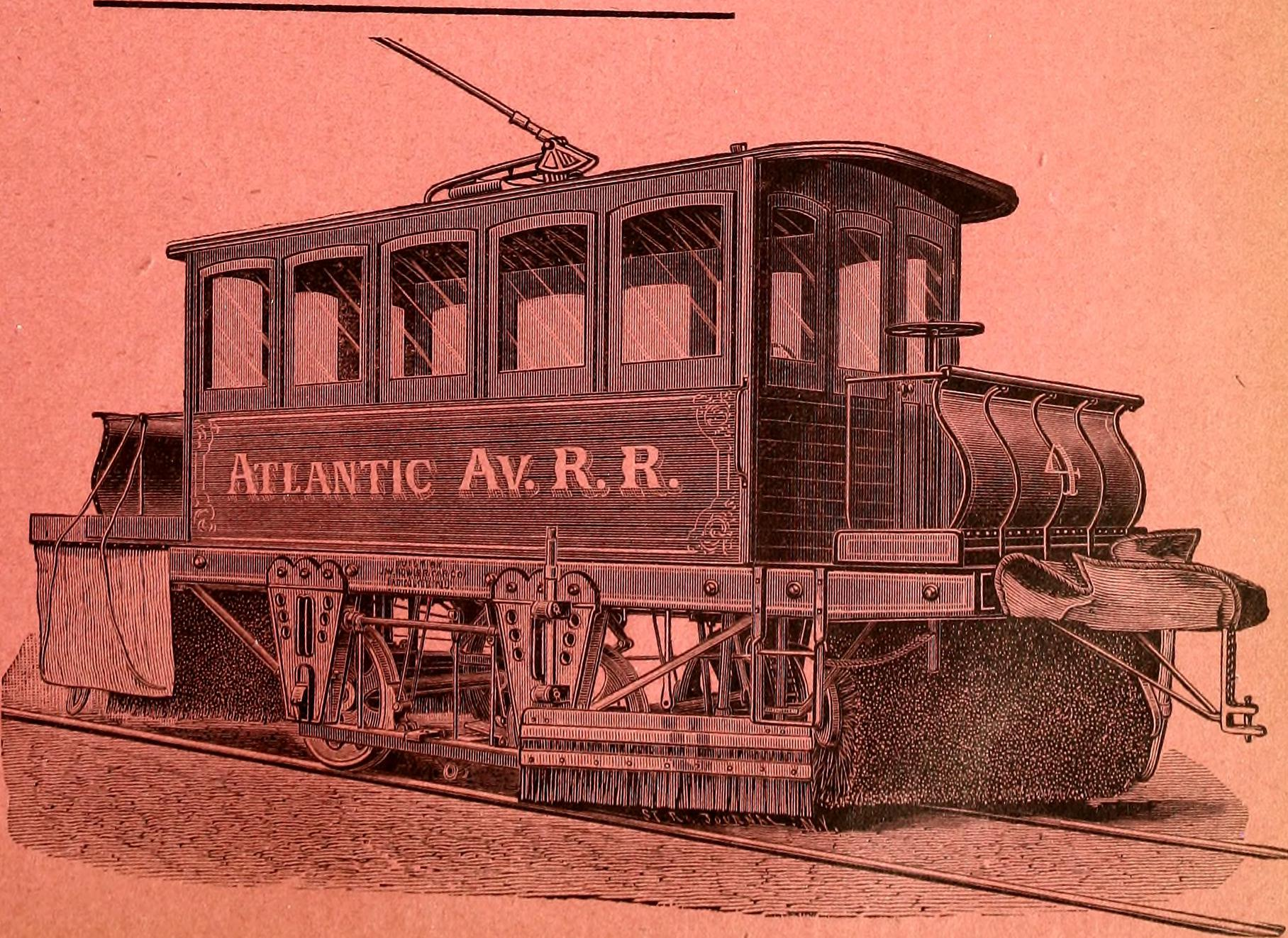
Snow sweeper owned by Atlantic Avenue Railroad from 1894.

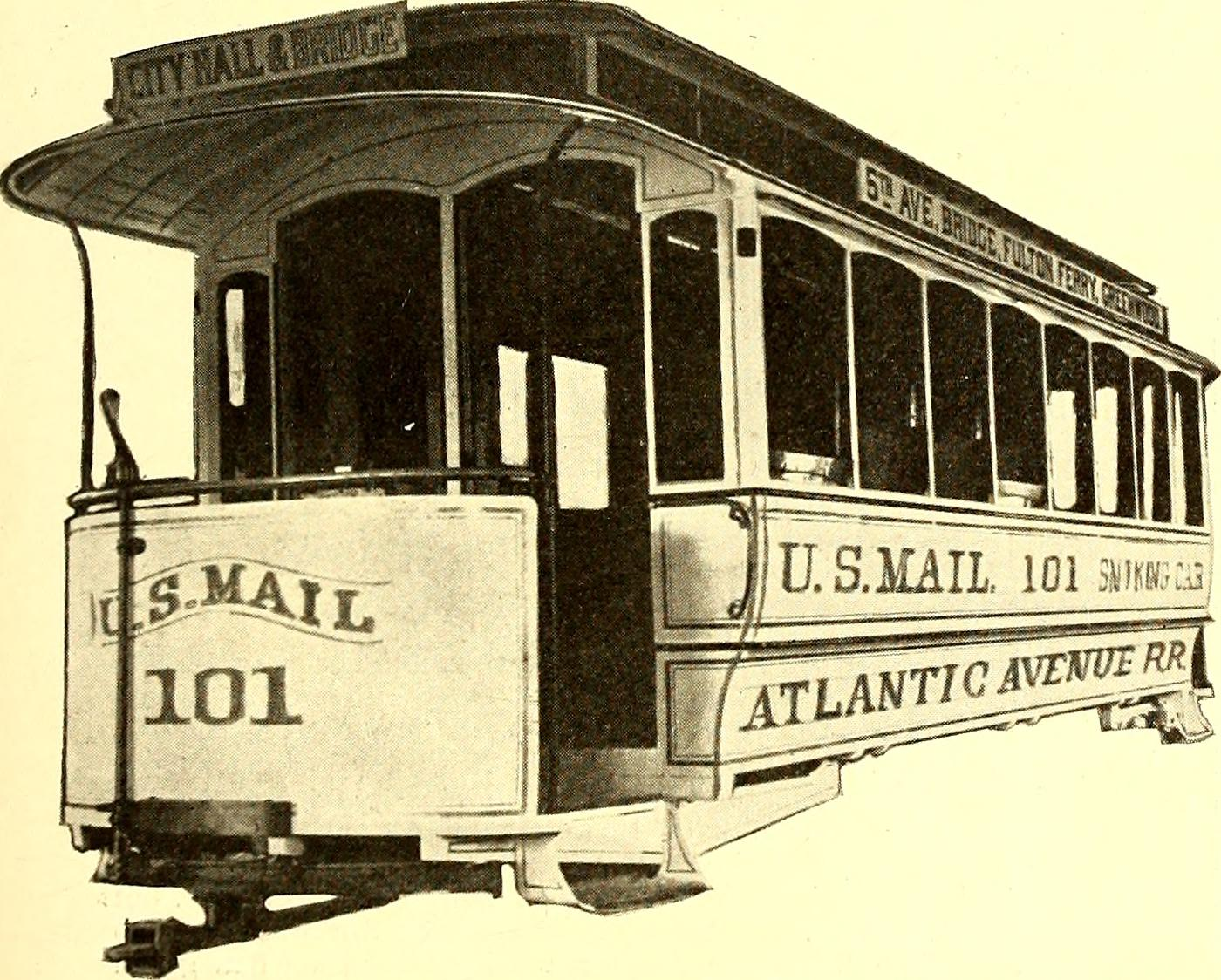
Postal streetcar owned by AA on the "City Hall and Bridge" Line.

The Atlantic Avenue Railroad was a company in the U.S. state of New York, with a main line connecting downtown Brooklyn with Jamaica along Atlantic Avenue. It was largely a streetcar company that operated its own trains, but the Long Island Rail Road operated both streetcars and steam trains over its main line. It later became part of the Nassau Electric Railroad, but is now divided between the active Atlantic Branch of the LIRR and the unused Cobble Hill Tunnel, which is preserved in its original state, albeit without service tracks.

== History ==
The Brooklyn and Jamaica Railroad was the first railroad on Long Island, incorporated on April 25, 1832, to build from the East River in Brooklyn to Jamaica. The Long Island Rail Road was chartered in 1834 to extend the line east to Greenport. When the Brooklyn and Jamaica was completed on April 18, 1836, its line was operated by the LIRR under lease. The original line ran from South Ferry on the Brooklyn waterfront east to a depot at the current 158th Street in Jamaica, with a ferry connection to lower Manhattan at South Ferry.

The Brooklyn Central Railroad was incorporated on August 31, 1859, to take over the Brooklyn and Jamaica Railroad, then operated by the Long Island Rail Road as a steam-powered line, for a horse car service once the LIRR completed their new line to Long Island City. This happened soon after the LIRR was authorized to abandon service through the Cobble Hill Tunnel to South Ferry in Brooklyn in exchange for ending steam power in the Brooklyn city limits.

The city authorized them on June 6 to lay tracks on Atlantic Avenue west of Boerum Place (where the Brooklyn and Jamaica passed through the Cobble Hill Tunnel); east of there, they would use the Brooklyn and Jamaica trackage. They were also granted on November 28, 1859, the right to build along Furman Street, the waterfront street from Atlantic Avenue north to Old Fulton Street, connecting the South Ferry (Atlantic Avenue) to the Wall Street Ferry (Montague Street) and Fulton Ferry (Old Fulton Street).

The Brooklyn Central Railroad and Brooklyn and Jamaica Railroad merged on August 8, 1860 to form the Brooklyn Central and Jamaica Railroad. The company also opened a line from Atlantic Avenue south on Flatbush Avenue and Fifth Avenue to 37th Street at Greenwood, with a branch east along Third Street to the city line. The LIRR ended steam service on Atlantic Avenue on September 30, 1861.

The Atlantic Avenue line became the Brooklyn and Jamaica Railway in 1866 and the Atlantic Avenue Railroad in 1872.

By 1892, the company operated over 23 miles (37 km) of tracks, principally in the west of Brooklyn. It operated ten different lines, each distinguished by means of different colors and lights. The lines operated were: Bergen Street, Butler Street, Fifteenth Street, Fifth Avenue–City Hall, Fifth Avenue–South Ferry, Hicks Street–Crosstown, Park Avenue, Seventh Avenue, and Vanderbilt Avenue. The company operated out of eight depots and carried 42,398 daily passengers. It also began preparations for electrification that year.

The Cobble Hill Tunnel remained empty and unused (despite several urban legends about illegal use) until its rediscovery in 1981.
