= Atlantic Avenue (New York City) =

Avenue in Brooklyn and Queens, New York

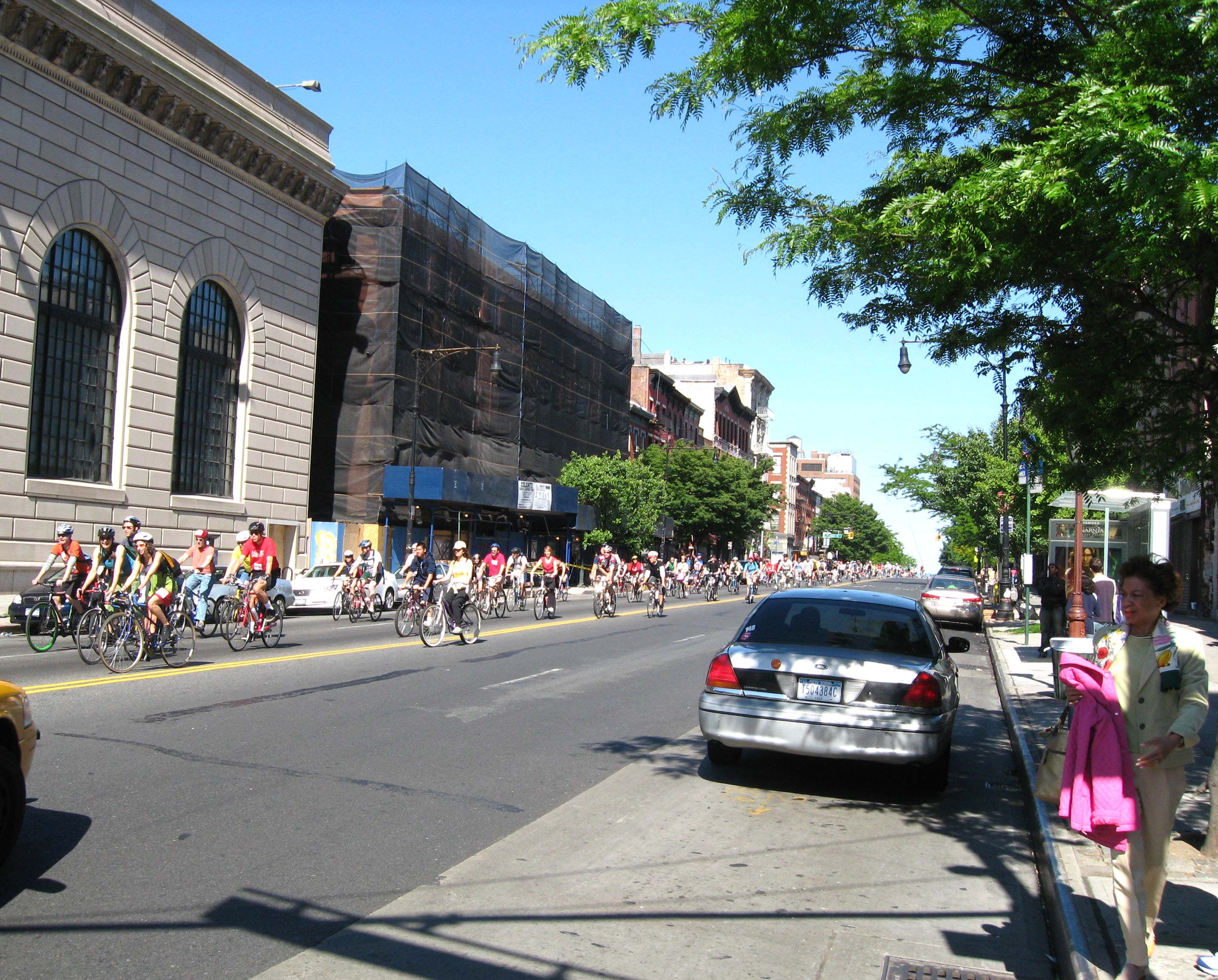
- Atlantic Avenue descending Cobble Hill
- Interactive map of Atlantic Avenue
- Namesake: Atlantic Avenue Railroad
- Owner: City of New York
- Maintained by: NYCDOT
- Length: 10.3 mi (16.6 km)
- Location: Brooklyn and Queens, New York, United States
- Nearest metro station: Atlantic Avenue; Atlantic Avenue – Barclays Center
- West end: Bridge Park Drive in Brooklyn Heights
- Major junctions: I-278 in Brooklyn Heights
- East end: I-678 / 94th Avenue in Jamaica

Atlantic Avenue is a major thoroughfare in the New York City boroughs of Brooklyn and Queens. It stretches from the Brooklyn waterfront on the East River all the way to Jamaica, Queens. Atlantic Avenue runs parallel to Fulton Street for much of its course through Brooklyn, where it serves as a border between the neighborhoods of Prospect Heights and Fort Greene and between Bedford-Stuyvesant and Crown Heights, and between Brooklyn Heights and Cobble Hill. This stretch of avenue is known for having a high rate of pedestrian fatalities and was described as "the killing fields of the city" in 2023.

Atlantic Avenue is the sole east–west through truck route across Brooklyn, mostly serving the purpose of the canceled Bushwick Expressway (Interstate 78) and the Brooklyn portion of the Cross Brooklyn Expressway (New York State Route 878, internally known as Interstate 878). The street connects to the existing segment of NY 878 via Conduit Boulevard, which splits from Atlantic Avenue in Brooklyn and connects to NY 878 in Queens.

== Route description ==
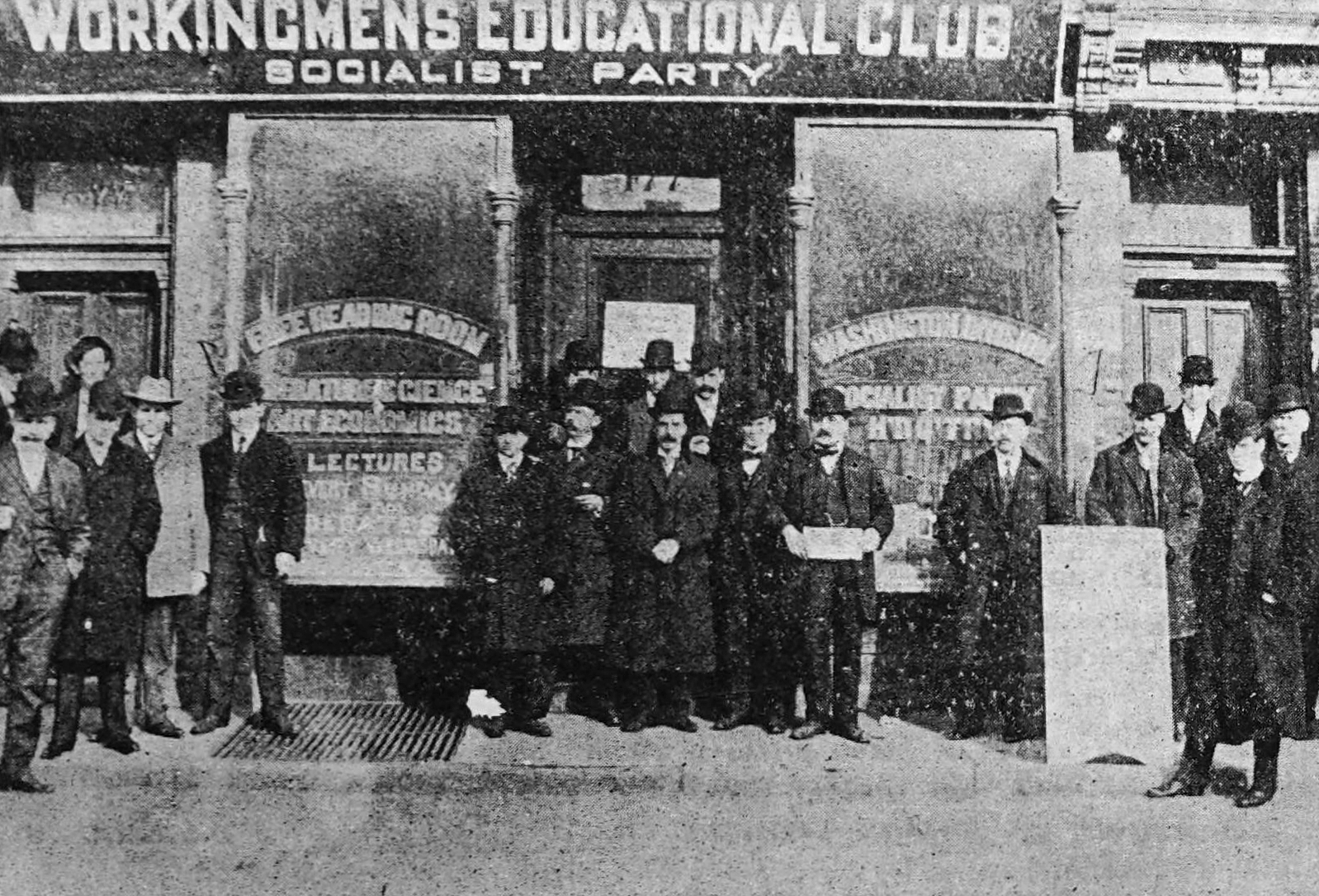
The Workingmen's Educational Club, a meeting hall for the Socialist Party of America at 477 Atlantic Avenue c. July 1909

In Brooklyn, the area of Atlantic nearest the South Ferry waterfront has long been known for its antique shops and its notable Arab community, including mosques, specialty shops and restaurants specializing in Middle Eastern cuisine. As it stretches east toward Flatbush Avenue, Atlantic separates the neighborhoods of Brooklyn Heights and Cobble Hill and passes through Boerum Hill near Downtown Brooklyn. This section of Atlantic Avenue is the site of the Atlantic Antic, an annual street fair involving local and visiting merchants and artists, held in early October.

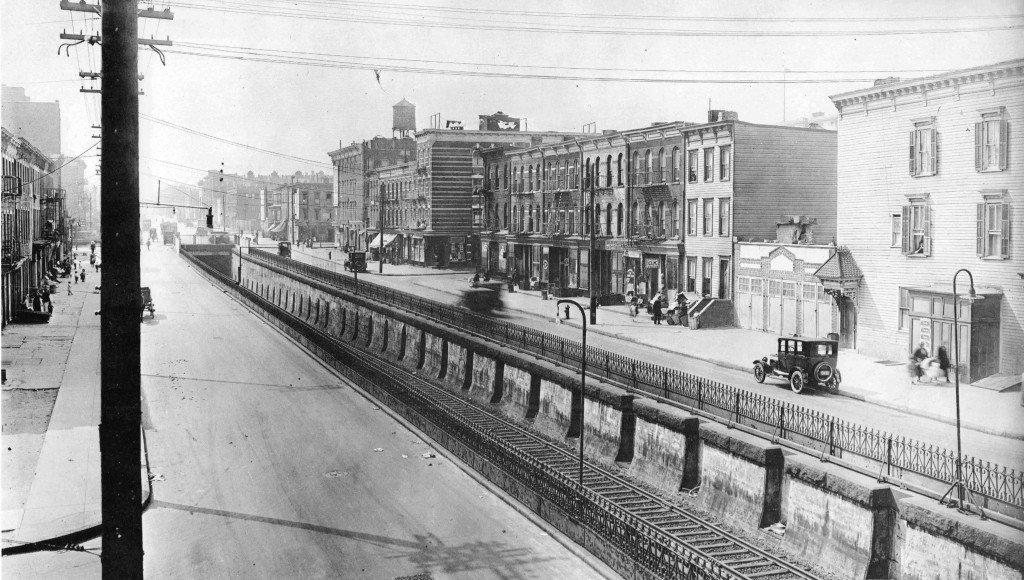
Atlantic Avenue in Brooklyn, 1922

At Flatbush Avenue and Fourth Avenue the crossing of the three major thoroughfares form a triangular intersection historically known as Times Plaza. Here the smaller shops, restaurants, churches and boutiques give way to the Atlantic Terminal, where subway services at the Atlantic Avenue–Barclays Center station converge with the Long Island Rail Road (LIRR). The area is dominated by massive buildings, formerly factories, now used by storage companies, and by the Atlantic Center Mall (opened in 1996, with tenants including P.C. Richard & Son and Modell's), Atlantic Terminal Mall (opened in 2004, with tenants including Target) and Barclays Center.

The face of Atlantic Avenue east of Flatbush Avenue, the site designated for the Brooklyn Atlantic Yards, is defined by the LIRR tracks that run beneath (from Flatbush Avenue to Bedford Avenue), above (from Bedford Avenue to Dewey Place), and beneath again in East New York until Lefferts Boulevard in Queens.

The Atlantic Avenue Railroad (now LIRR) originally ran along Atlantic Avenue as streetcars pulled by horses. With electrification, other traffic was eliminated from the roadway and Atlantic Avenue became discontinuous. When railway sections west of Jamaica station were put underground in the early 1940s, that portion of Atlantic Avenue became continuous again. Northeast of Bedford Avenue, the railway is still at (or above) ground level.

Just east of the Van Wyck Expressway, the roadway narrows to one lane and carries eastbound traffic only to 95th Avenue (westbound traffic diverges to 94th Avenue past this point). The one-block section between the Van Wyck Expressway and 95th Avenue opened in July 2020 as part of the $17 million Gateway Park project. Atlantic Avenue from the Brooklyn Docks to Gateway Park at Van Wyck Expressway is 10.3 miles long, with 7.4 miles in Brooklyn, making it one of Brooklyn's longest streets.

Pre-electrification maps from 1909 and 1910 show Atlantic Avenue, at that time, continued to the city line.

=== Other iterations of this road ===
Short roadways still named Atlantic Avenue exist further east adjacent to the LIRR Main Line within Nassau County. A stretch of road still named Atlantic Avenue, just under one mile long, runs just south of the Main Line from the Bellerose station to the Floral Park station.

Just north of the Merillon Avenue train station in Garden City is another short roadway called Atlantic Avenue. Other short segments of roadway called Atlantic Avenue exist adjacent to the Main Line at Carle Place in Nassau County, and even as far east as the approach to the Nassau-Suffolk County line, just beyond the Farmingdale LIRR station.

=== Similarly named roads in New York ===
There is a four-block-long Atlantic Avenue in Sea Gate, Brooklyn.

== Transportation ==
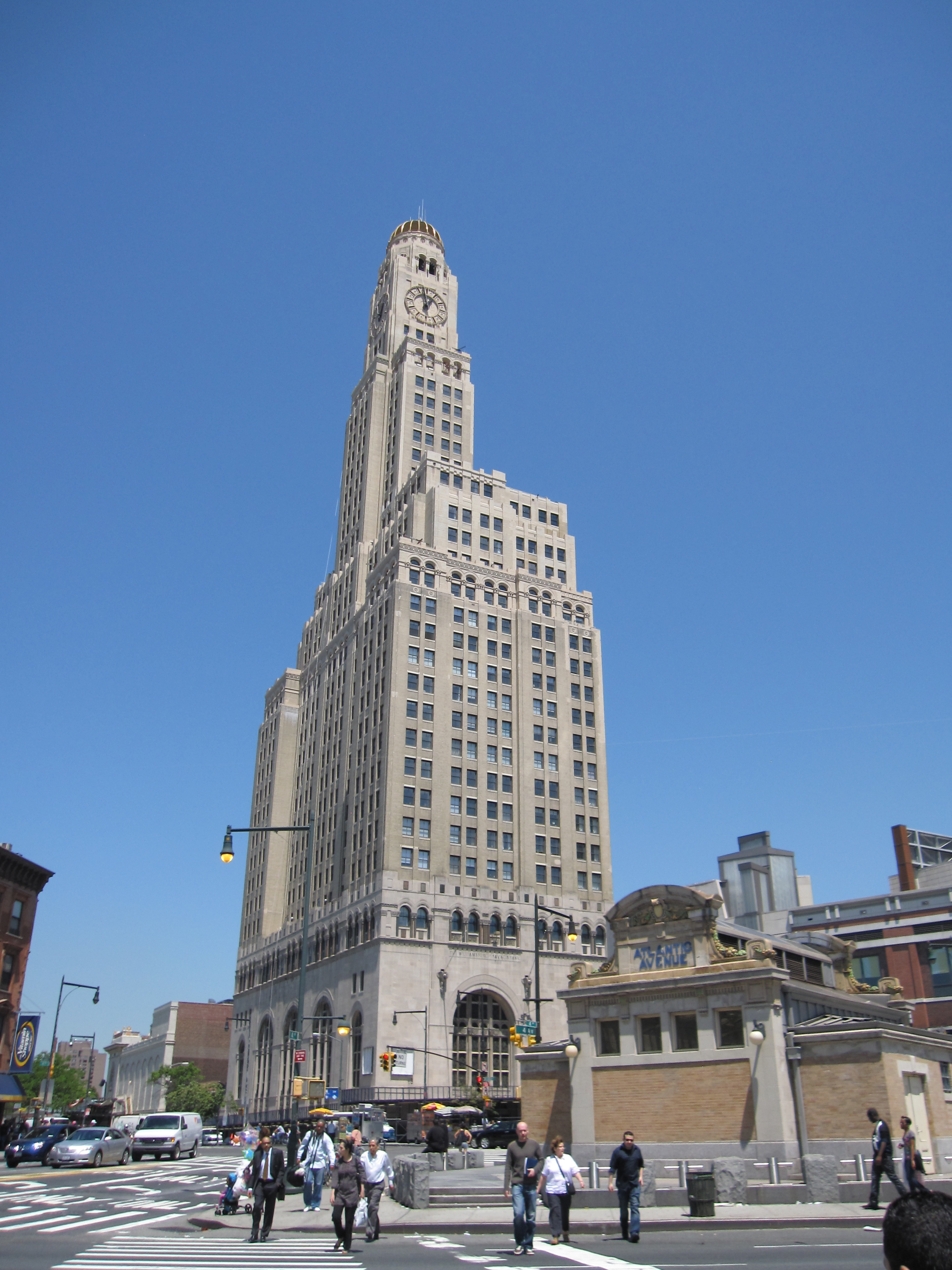
Disused headhouse of Atlantic Avenue subway station. The Williamsburgh Savings Bank Tower is shown in the background.

Atlantic Avenue is served by the following:

- The Q24 New York City Bus route runs on Atlantic Avenue between Van Wyck Expressway and Pennsylvania Avenue.
- The B63 runs on the corridor west of Flatbush Avenue.
- The B61 runs between Columbia Street and either Boerum Place (Park Slope), or Smith Street (Downtown Brooklyn).
- The B45 runs between Flatbush and Washington Avenues.
- Crown Heights-bound B65 buses run on Atlantic Avenue from Boerum Place to Third Avenue.
- The Barclays Center-bound B37 runs from Third to Fourth Avenues.
- The B12 deadheads on Atlantic Avenue from Mary Warren Place to Alabama Avenue to change direction.
- The New York City Subway's BMT Canarsie Line (L train) has a station on this street at East New York Avenue, with another entrance at Van Sinderen Avenue.
- The Atlantic Avenue–Barclays Center station (2, 3, 4, 5, B, D, N, Q, R and W trains) is located at 4th and Flatbush Avenues.
- The Long Island Rail Road stations on the Atlantic Branch are located at Flatbush Avenue, Nostrand Avenue, and Van Sinderen Avenue.

== See also ==
- Atlantic Avenue Tunnel
- Atlantic Branch of the Long Island Rail Road
- Atlantic Terminal LIRR station
- Atlantic Avenue–Barclays Center station
- Atlantic Terminal Mall
