= Fulton Ferry, Brooklyn =

Neighborhood in New York City

- Fulton Ferry District
- U.S. National Register of Historic Places
- U.S. Historic district
- New York State Register of Historic Places
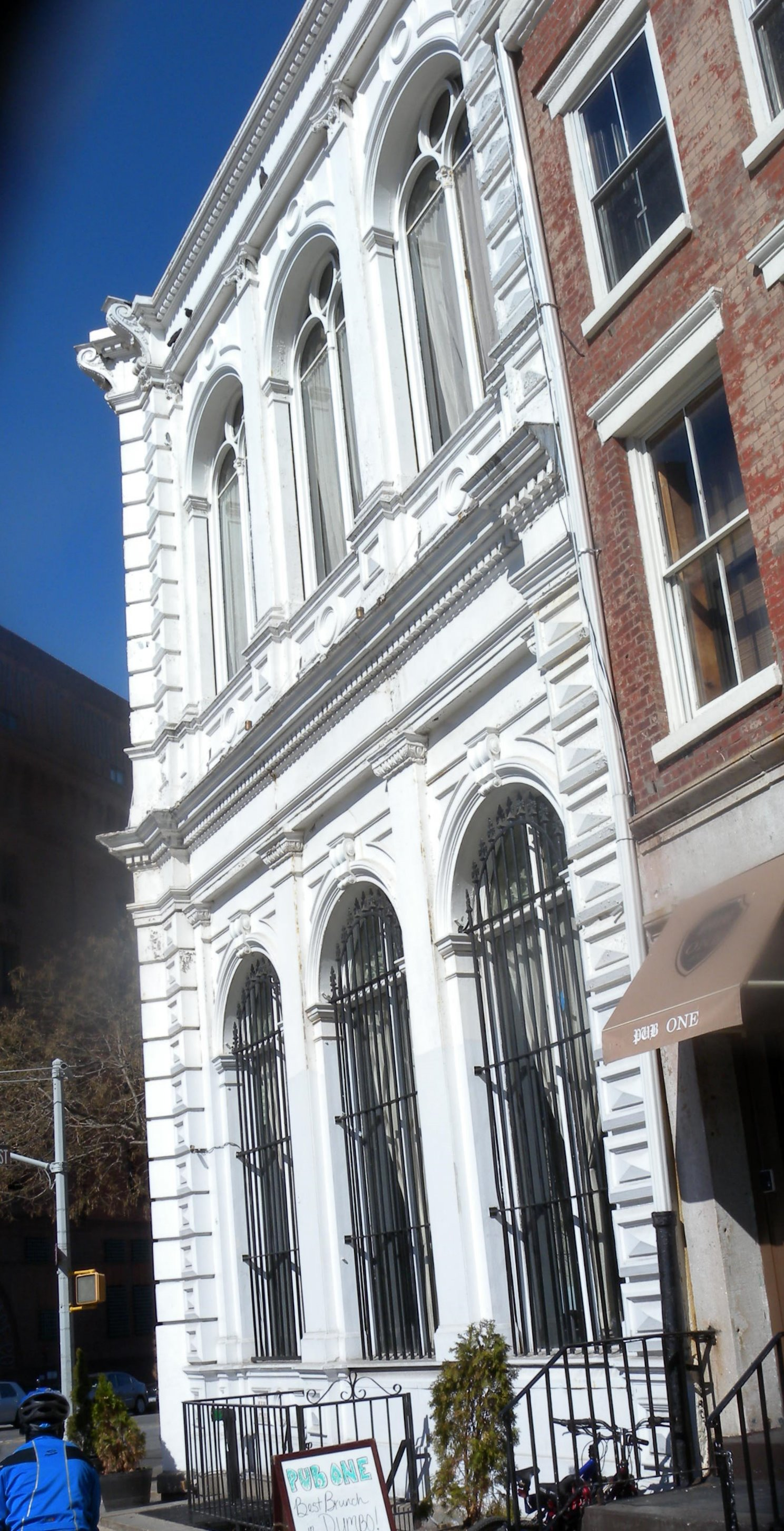
- 1 Front Street

- Location within New York City Location within New York Location within the United States
- Location: Roughly bounded by the East River and Washington, Water, Front, and Doughty Sts., New York, New York
- Coordinates: 40°42′12″N 73°59′35″W
- Area: 16 acres (6.5 ha)
- Built: 1830
- Architect: Freeman, Frank; Et al.
- Architectural style: Romanesque, Richardsonian Romanesque
- NRHP reference No.: 74001251

Significant dates
- Added to NRHP: June 28, 1974
- Designated NYSRHP: June 23, 1980

Fulton Ferry is a small area adjacent to Dumbo in the New York City borough of Brooklyn. The neighborhood is named for the Fulton Ferry, a prominent ferry line that crossed the East River between Manhattan and Brooklyn, and is also the name of the ferry slip on the Brooklyn side. The neighborhood is part of Brooklyn Community District 2.

The Fulton Ferry District is a national historic district listed on the National Register of Historic Places in 1974. It consists of 15 contributing buildings built between 1830 and 1895. They are an assortment of commercial and commercial and residential brick buildings ranging from two to four stories in height. There is one eight-story building, the Eagle Warehouse, a Romanesque Revival style building built by The Brooklyn Eagle in 1893. The district is bisected overhead by the Brooklyn Bridge. Today the area holds many popular attractions such as Pier One of Brooklyn Bridge Park and Grimaldi's Pizzeria. Bargemusic, a concert venue, is moored there today. Manhattan ferry service returned in 2006 at the next pier to the north.

== Ferry service ==
=== Fulton Ferry ===
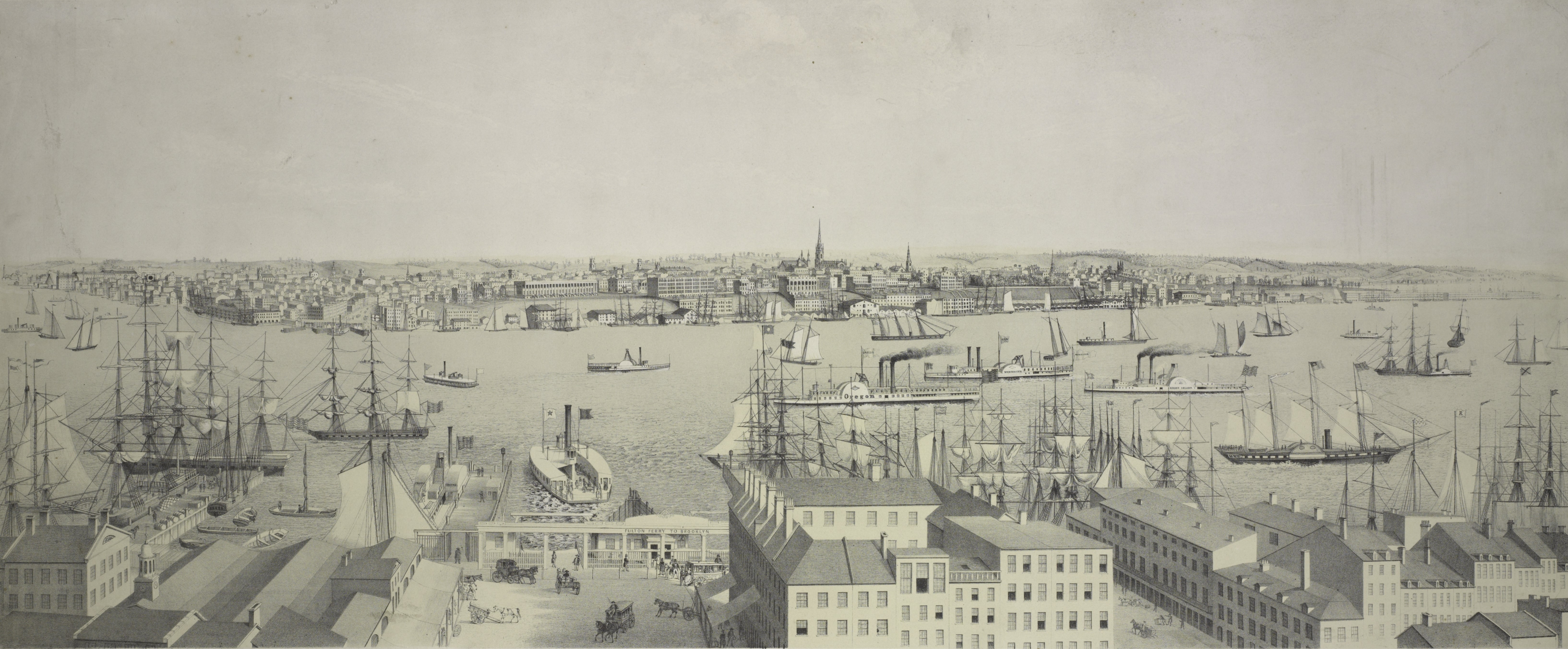
View of Fulton Ferry, L.I. From U.S. Hotel, in Lower Manhattan, New York, 1845

Sailboats and rowboats could be hired from what became Fulton Ferry to travel to Manhattan as early as 1642. The Fulton Ferry Company began a regular service in 1814, and by 1872 there were 1,200 daily crossings. Infrastructure developed around this transport link. However, the opening of the Brooklyn Bridge in 1883 reduced demand, and the Fulton Ferry stopped operating in 1924. The major thoroughfares leading to the Fulton Ferry from both landings were (and are) named Fulton Street, both in Manhattan and in Brooklyn. The BMT Fulton Street Line and BMT Lexington Avenue Line (or "Old Main Line") elevated railways both ended at the Brooklyn side of the ferry, but were later moved with the majority of trips using the Brooklyn Bridge.

=== East River Ferry ===
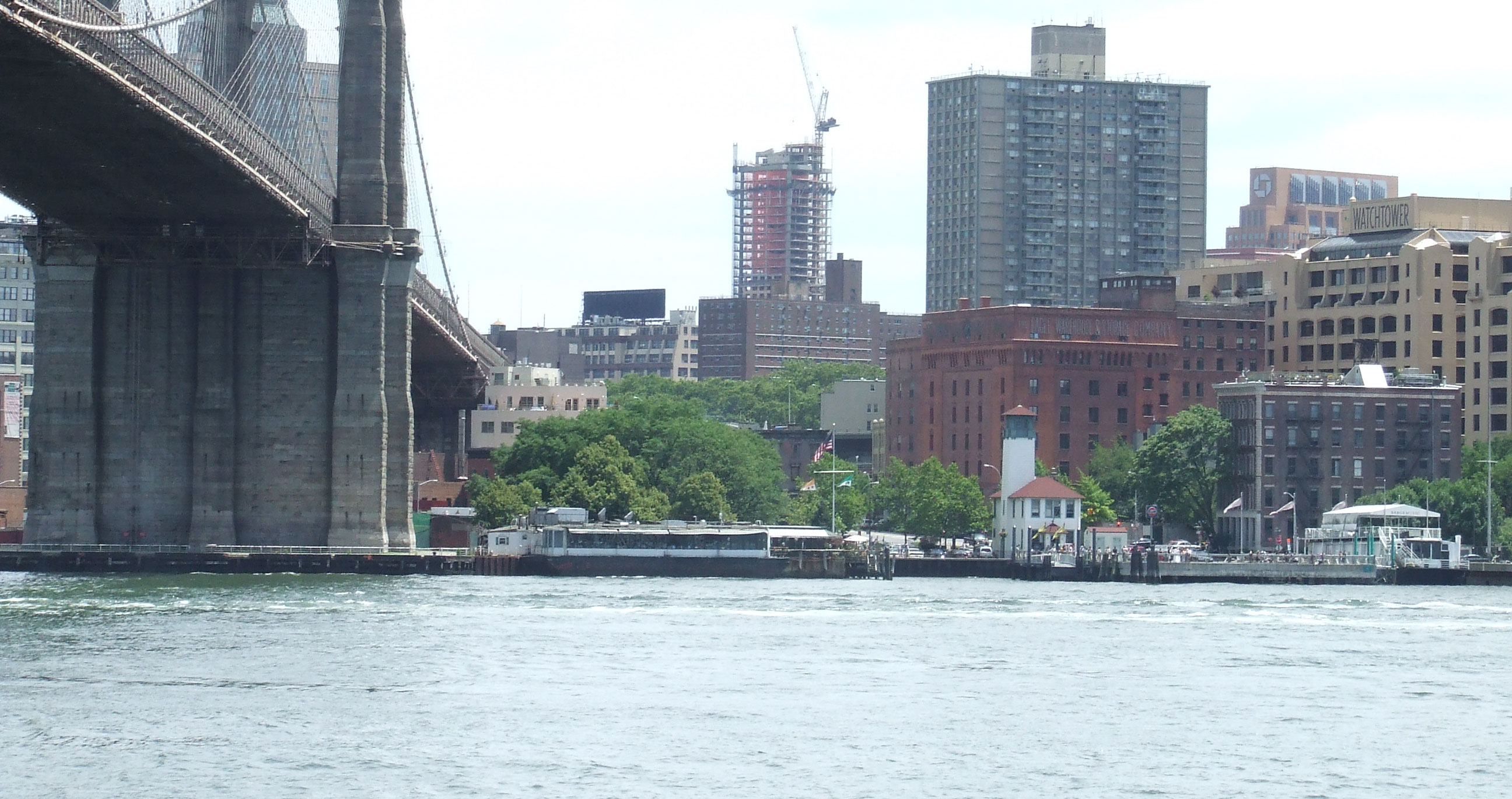
Ferry slip from East River

Ferry service to Manhattan returned in 2006, with New York Water Taxi operating seasonal service. In February 2011, New York Waterway was contracted to operate a route calling at six slips in Brooklyn and Queens as well as the Manhattan East Side terminals. Service, begun in June 2011, operates in both directions with year-round peak service running every 20 minutes. Additional Summer (April-Oct) daily service runs off-peak every 30 minutes. The NY Waterway service became part of NYC Ferry's East River route in May 2017. In addition, Fulton Ferry has been served by NYC Ferry's South Brooklyn route since 2017.
