= History of the Brooklyn Nets =

History of professional basketball team

Primary logo of the Brooklyn Nets from 2012 to 2024, as designed by Timothy Morris. The shield design carried over an element of the New Jersey Nets' previous logo while also drawing inspiration from the franchise's original New Jersey Americans logo.

The Brooklyn Nets, a professional basketball team based in the New York City borough of Brooklyn, were founded in 1967 and initially played in Teaneck, New Jersey, as the New Jersey Americans, followed by a period spent in Long Island as the New York Nets and later returning to play as the New Jersey Nets. They are a member of the Atlantic Division of the Eastern Conference in the National Basketball Association (NBA), as well as an original member of the American Basketball Association (ABA). In 2012, the team moved to Brooklyn and were renamed the Brooklyn Nets.

== 1967–1976: The ABA years ==
The franchise was established in 1967 as a founding member of the American Basketball Association (ABA), with trucking magnate Arthur J. Brown as the owner. Brown had operated several AAU teams in and around New York City, and was viewed as an ideal pick to run the nascent league's New York franchise. The team was named the New York Americans, and Brown intended for it to play at the 69th Regiment Armory in Manhattan, but pressure from the New York Knicks of the older National Basketball Association (NBA) forced the Armory to back out three months before opening day. Brown found it difficult to find a suitable replacement venue in New York. Many of them were booked solid, and others had owners who did not want to anger the Knicks by opening their doors to a rival team. The team was left scrambling for a venue with opening day approaching, and it finally settled on the Teaneck Armory in Teaneck, New Jersey. While the franchise's name officially remained the New York Americans, it played as the New Jersey Americans. It would not be the last time that the Knicks directly affected the franchise's future.

The Americans played fairly well in their first season, tying the Kentucky Colonels for the fourth (and final) playoff spot in the Eastern Division. However, the Teaneck Armory was booked, forcing the Americans to scramble for a last-minute replacement. They found one in the Long Island Arena in Commack, New York.

When the Americans and Colonels arrived for the game, they found that the floor had several missing boards and bolts, and was unstable in several areas (one player claimed to have seen one side of the floor come up when he stepped on another). There was no padding on the backboards or basket supports, and one basket appeared to be higher than the other. There was also a large amount of condensation from a hockey game the previous night. After the Colonels refused to play under these conditions, league commissioner George Mikan ruled that the Americans had failed to provide acceptable playing facilities and forfeited the game to the Colonels.

After a planned move to Newark, New Jersey fell through, the team opted to stay at the Long Island Arena for the second year, and changed its name to the New York Nets. The name "Nets" was used because it rhymes with the names of two other professional sports teams that played in the New York metropolitan area at the time: Major League Baseball's New York Mets and the American Football League's New York Jets, and because it relates to basketball in general, as it is part of the basket.

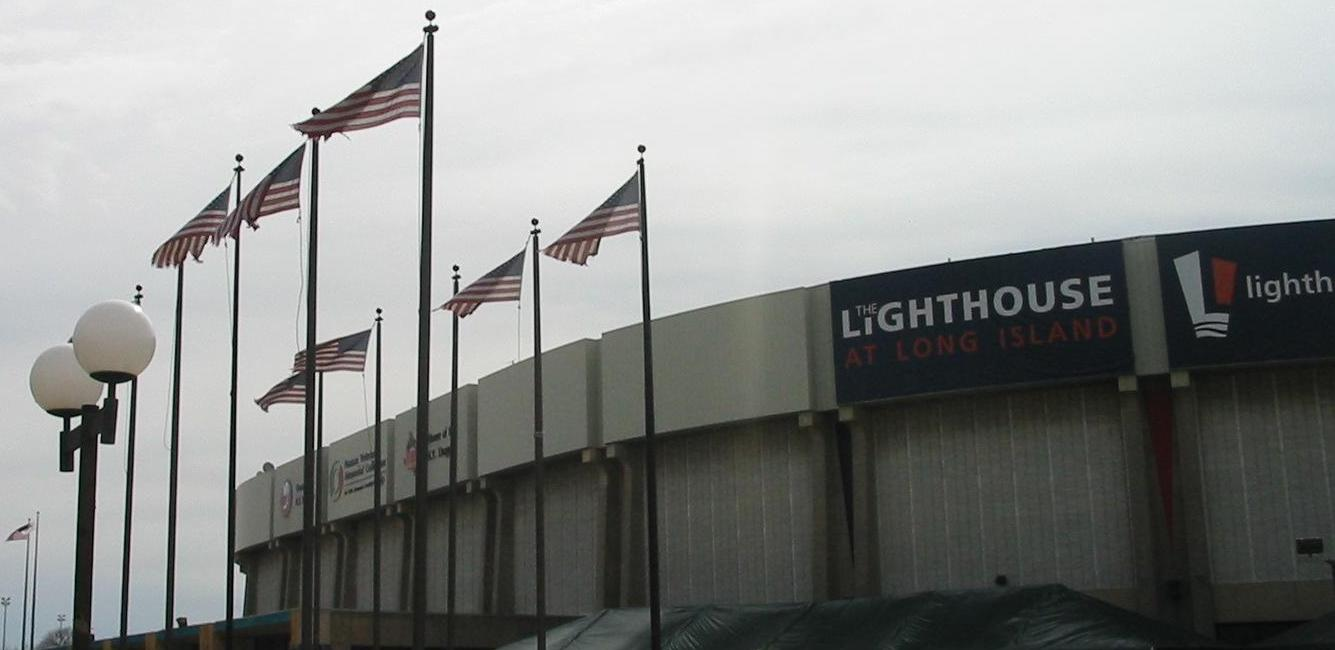
The Nassau Veterans Memorial Coliseum was the home of the New York Nets from 1972 to 1977.

The team finished last in its first New York season and drew a paltry 1,108 a game, about half of what it had drawn a year earlier. They posted a 17–61 record, and shuffled 23 different players on and off the roster. Brown sold the team to clothing manufacturer Roy Boe after that season. Boe started off his ownership with big hopes for the off-season. Desperate for a star, the team pursued UCLA star Lew Alcindor, and won rights to him in a secret ABA draft. Alcindor was reportedly interested in playing in his native New York, but after contemplating his options for a month, he instead opted to sign with the NBA's Milwaukee Bucks. Nonetheless, the Nets moved on with their off-season plans to move to the Island Garden in West Hempstead. Led by an ABA top 3 scoring guard Levern Tart, the Nets finished in fourth place and made the playoffs for the first time in franchise history in the 1969–70 season, and attendance went up threefold to 3,504. During the 1970 off-season, the team finally managed to acquire a star in Rick Barry after trading their No. 1 pick and cash to the Virginia Squires. After another playoff season at the Island Garden, the team moved to the brand new Nassau Veterans Memorial Coliseum in Uniondale for the end of the 1971–72 season.

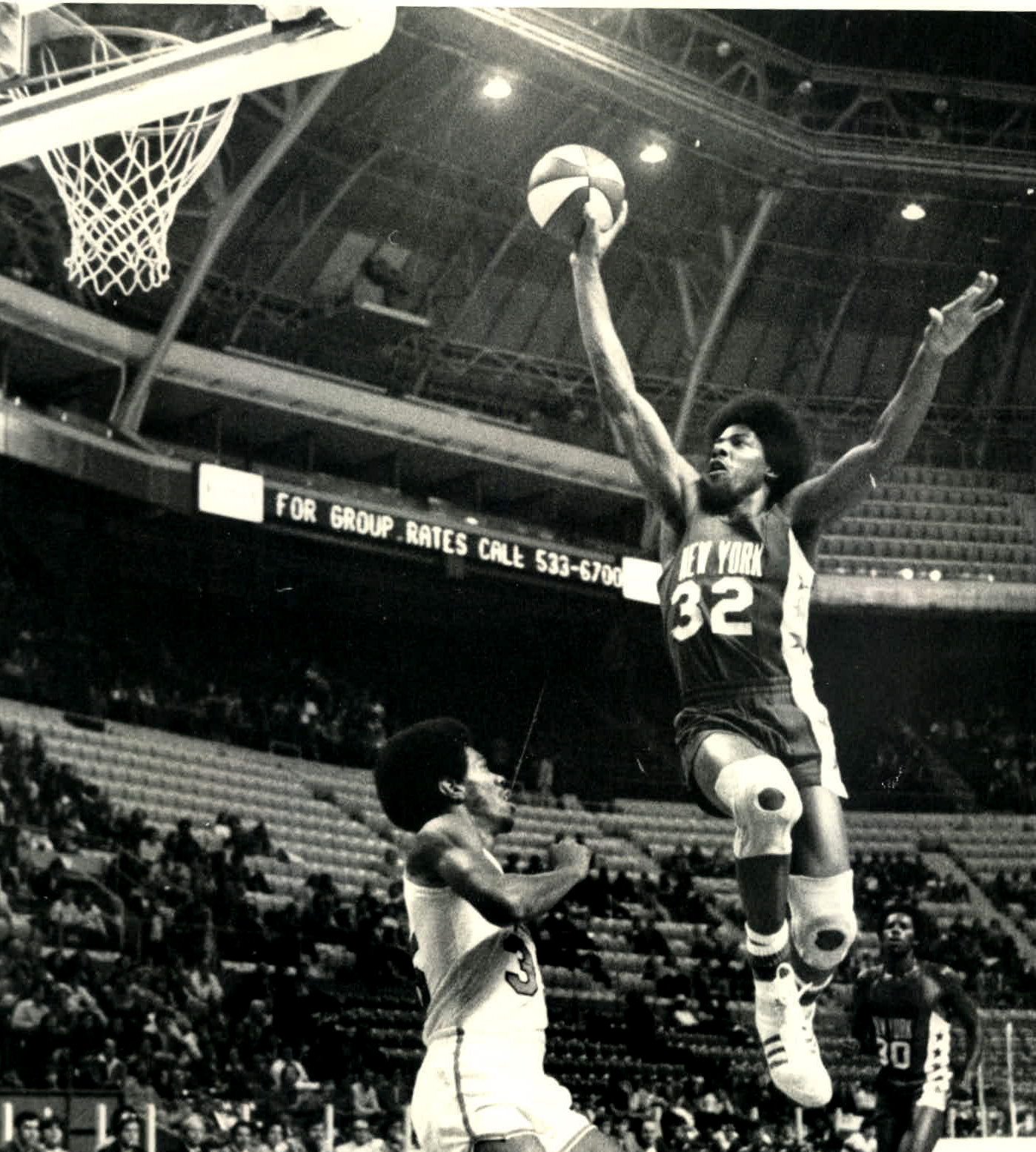
Julius Erving helped the Nets win two ABA championships.

In 1972, two years after the acquisition of Barry, the Nets advanced to their first ABA Finals. However, they could not overcome the Indiana Pacers and lost the series four games to two. Barry left after that postseason, sending the Nets into rebuilding mode. The 1972–73 season was one of disappointment, as the Nets only managed to win 30 games.

The 1973–74 season saw the Nets finally put all the pieces together. The key event of the season though would come in the 1973 off-season, as the Nets acquired Julius Erving from the Virginia Squires. With Erving, who was affectionately known as "Dr. J", the Nets ended the season with a franchise record 55 victories. After Erving was voted the ABA's MVP, the Nets advanced in the playoffs and won their first title, defeating the Utah Stars in the 1974 ABA Finals.

The success continued into the 1974–75 season as they topped the previous season's win record by winning 58 games—a record that still stands to this day. The Nets, though, were eliminated four games to one, by the Spirits of St. Louis in the first round of the 1975 ABA playoffs.

Tragedy struck the Nets on the afternoon of June 24, 1975, when forward Wendell Ladner was killed when Eastern Air Lines Flight 66 crashed after being caught in severe wind shear upon final approach to John F. Kennedy International Airport.

The Nets continued their winning ways in the 1975–76 season—the final season for the ABA—with Erving leading them to a successful 55–win season; he also was named MVP again that year. After a grueling series with the Denver Nuggets, the Nets won the last ABA championship series in league history in six games. The series clincher had Erving leading the Nets on a massive fourth quarter comeback at the Nassau Coliseum after being down 22 points in the third quarter, with a decisive 28 points performance from John Williamson. The win gave the team their second championship in three years.

== 1976–1981: The move to the NBA and return to New Jersey ==
The summer of 1976 saw the ABA–NBA merger finally take place. As part of the merger agreement, four teams from the ABA—the Nets, Denver Nuggets, Indiana Pacers, and San Antonio Spurs—joined the NBA. The Nets and Nuggets had actually applied to join the NBA in 1975, but were forced to play a lame-duck season in the ABA by court order. Before their first NBA season, the Nets traded two draft picks to the Kansas City Kings for guard Nate Archibald. The Nets appeared to be poised to pick up where they left off in the ABA.

However, they got a rude surprise when the NBA forced the Nets to pay an additional $4.8 million "invasion fee" directly to the Knicks as a condition of being allowed to share the New York area. Coming on the heels of the $3.2 million that the team had to pay for joining the NBA, this left Boe short of cash, and he was forced to renege on a promised pay raise for Erving. Erving refused to play for the Nets under these conditions and refused to report to camp.

The Nets offered Erving's contract to the Knicks in return for waiving the indemnity, but the Knicks turned it down. When the Philadelphia 76ers offered to acquire Erving for $3 million—roughly the same amount they had to pay for NBA membership—Boe had little choice but to accept. In essence, the Nets were forced to trade their franchise player for a berth in the NBA.

Without Erving, the Nets wrote off the 1976–77 season as a lost cause. However, they lost all semblance of respectability when Archibald broke his foot in January. The team finished at 22–60, the worst record in the league. The team did set one record of sorts; in February 1977, they became the first NBA team ever to have an all-left-handed starting lineup, with Tim Bassett, Al Skinner, Bubbles Hawkins, Dave Wohl, and Kim Hughes.

Due to the team's low attendance and poor financial picture on Long Island, Boe decided to move the franchise back to New Jersey before the 1977–78 season. The Knicks once again became an obstacle and threatened to block the move because it would infringe on their exclusive territorial rights to New Jersey. The Nets responded by suing the Knicks on the basis that their actions violated anti-trust laws. The lawsuit was settled between the teams after the league and the state of New Jersey intervened, and the Nets agreed to pay another $4 million to the Knicks for the rights to move.

With the move official, the team was renamed the New Jersey Nets after its new home state. While the team awaited the completion of a new arena at the Meadowlands Sports Complex in East Rutherford, they played four seasons at the Rutgers Athletic Center at Rutgers University in Piscataway. The 1978–1979 season saw the team, aided by the strong play of Bernard King, qualify for its first NBA playoff appearance. They fell to Philadelphia 2–0 in the first round, with the loss setting the stage for a period of rebuilding in the coming decade.

== 1981–1986: A promising start to the decade ==
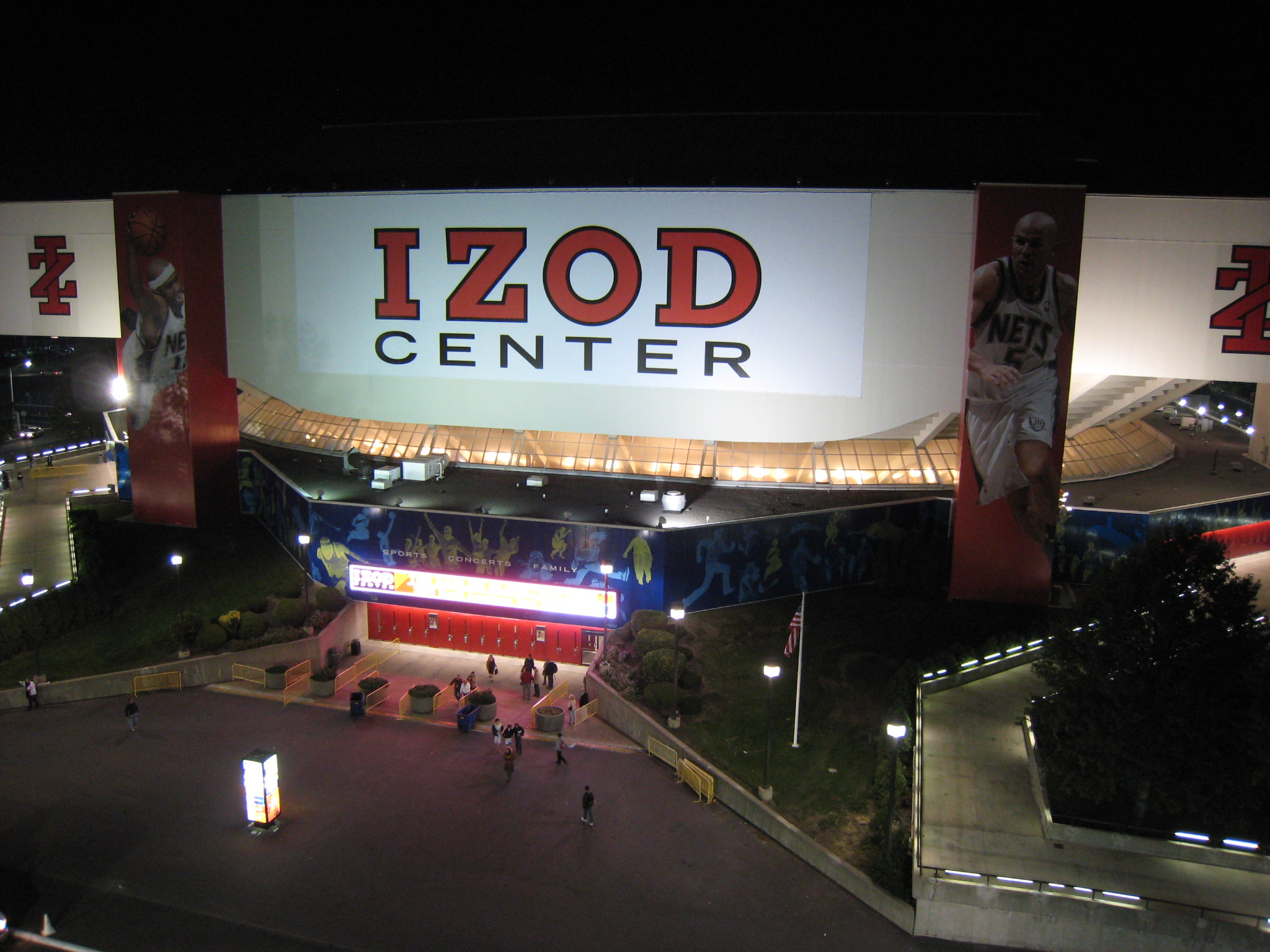
Meadowlands Arena, formerly the Brendan Byrne and Continental Airlines Arena, and the Izod Center, was the home of the Nets from 1981 to 2010.

In 1981, the team moved to the Meadowlands, into the now-completed Brendan Byrne Arena (later renamed the Meadowlands Arena, Continental Airlines Arena, and Izod Center) and experienced modest success with four consecutive winning seasons. In 1982–83, while coached by Larry Brown, the Nets were having their best season since joining the NBA. However, Brown accepted the head coaching job at the University of Kansas during the last month of the season and was suspended for the rest of the season. The Nets would never recover from the coaching change and would lose in the first round of the playoffs to their Hudson River rival, the New York Knicks.

In the 1983–84 season, the Nets fielded what was believed to be their best team since joining the league. Led by Darryl Dawkins, Buck Williams, Otis Birdsong, and Micheal Ray Richardson, the team won their first NBA playoff series, defeating the defending champion 76ers in the first round of the 1984 NBA playoffs before falling to the Milwaukee Bucks in the conference semifinals in six games.

Injuries plagued the team during the 1984–85 season, but the Nets still managed to win 42 games before being eliminated from the playoffs by the Detroit Pistons in three games.

== 1986–1990: Injury-plagued years ==
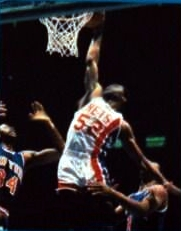
Buck Williams led the Nets in rebounding for most of the 1980s and set many all-time team records during his eight seasons in New Jersey.

Newly hired head coach Dave Wohl helped lead the Nets to a respectable record at the beginning of the 1985–86 season, posting a 23–14 start. New Jersey's promising start dissipated with the loss of two of its top scorers. All-Star Micheal Ray Richardson flunked a drug test for the third time and was banned from the league for life, and star center Darryl Dawkins only played 39 games due to a back injury. Long-time Nets veterans Buck Williams and Mike Gminski filled in the gap and powered the club on both offense and defense, helping the Nets earn the 7th seed in the 1986 NBA playoffs with a 39–43 record before being swept by the Milwaukee Bucks in the first round. This would be the first of many losing seasons for the Nets, and the team would not qualify for the playoffs again until the 1991–92 season.

New Jersey acquired Orlando Woolridge and drafted Dwayne "Pearl" Washington in hopes of strengthening the faltering team, yet the season only brought more misfortune to the Garden State. Dawkins slipped in his bathtub and suffered another back injury, effectively ending his career. Birdsong played in only seven games while nursing a shin stress fracture and Washington had a shoddy rookie year performance. A formerly solid backcourt soon became plagued with injuries and contract disputes. The Nets ended the 1986–87 season with a 24–58 record, the club's worst finish since 1980.

Hoping to maximize the team's health in the upcoming season, the Nets traded injury-plagued Dawkins in a three-way deal that brought John Bagley and Keith Lee to New Jersey. The Nets selected Dennis Hopson (over Scottie Pippen, Reggie Miller and Kevin Johnson) as the third pick of the 1987 NBA draft in hopes of re-establishing a stable backcourt. However the injury bug bit again when Bagley, Lee and reserve Tony Brown became hurt at the start of the 1987–88 season. In addition, leading scorer Orlando Woolridge was suspended by the league for violation of the league substance abuse policy 19 games through the season. New Jersey axed coach Wohl after 15 games, and went through three different coaches over the course of the season, finishing with the second worst record in the league at 19–63.

Hopson was never able to live up to the organization's expectations and subsequent first round draft picks Chris Morris (1988) and Mookie Blaylock (1989) also failed to reverse the team's descent. By the 1989–90 season the Nets would finish with an NBA worst 17–65 record, which was also at that point the worst in franchise history.

== 1990–1996: Another promising start and downfall ==
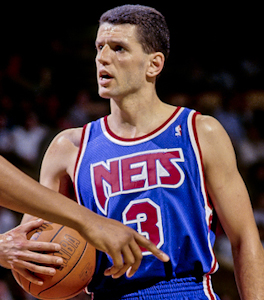
Basketball Hall-of-Famer Dražen Petrović played three seasons with the Nets before he was killed in a car crash. His number 3 jersey has been retired by the team.

During the early 1990s, the Nets began to improve behind a core of young players. New Jersey drafted forward Derrick Coleman with the first pick of the 1990 draft and then took guard Kenny Anderson with the second pick of the following draft. The Nets later added Dražen Petrović in a trade with the Portland Trail Blazers. Although the Nets did not finish with a winning record in the 1991–92 season, they finished sixth overall in the conference and qualified for the playoffs. The Nets lost to the Cleveland Cavaliers in the first round, three games to one, and coach Bill Fitch left after the season.

The team improved significantly in 1992–93, led by the emerging trio of Petrović, Coleman and Anderson. Chuck Daly, who had been let go by the Detroit Pistons after the 1991–92 season, was hired by the Nets and immediately paid dividends. However, injuries to both Anderson and Petrović toward the end of the season sent the team into a 1–10 slump to end the regular season. The Nets finished the season at 43–39, which again earned them the sixth seed and a date with the Cavaliers in the first round. With Anderson out with a broken hand and Petrović playing on an injured knee, the Nets lost a tough five-game series.

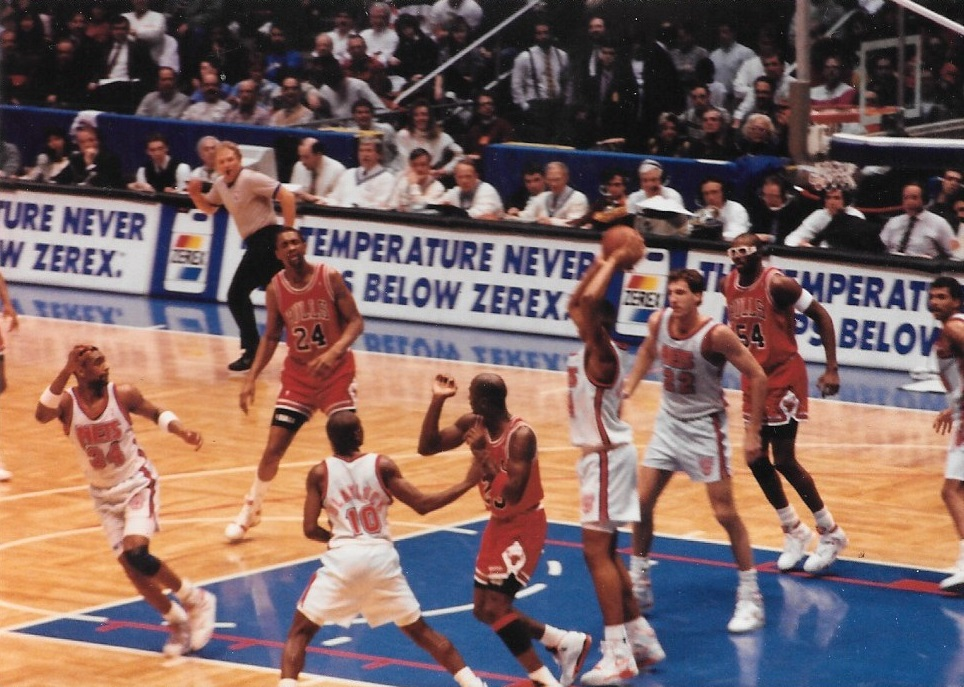
A Nets game against the Chicago Bulls in 1991

The Nets experienced tragedy in the off-season, as Petrović was killed in an auto accident in Germany. Still, the team managed to win 45 games during the 1993–94 season. Anderson and Coleman made their only All-Star appearances this season, also becoming the first two Nets players to ever start in an All-Star Game. The Nets again qualified for the playoffs as the East's seventh seed, but were eliminated by the New York Knicks the first round of the 1994 NBA playoffs, three games to one.

After the 1993–94 season Daly resigned and Butch Beard was hired to be the team's head coach. The Nets struggled through the rest of the decade. During the mid-1990s, the NBA's main image problem was that of the selfish, immature athlete, and the Nets exemplified this. In 1995, Coleman was featured on the cover of Sports Illustrated as the poster child of the selfish NBA player, with Anderson, Benoit Benjamin, Dwayne Schintzius and Chris Morris among the mentioned athletes. The team's reputation was so poor that in an effort to shed its negative image, team president Jon Spoelstra decided to rename the team the New Jersey Swamp Dragons in 1994, partly inspired by the New Jersey Meadowlands in which the team played. After the team obtained approval from ownership and spent $500,000 on trademarks, the name was ultimately rejected when Nets co-owner David Gerstein changed his mind and voted 'no' as the name was sent to the NBA Board of Governors for approval, despite unanimous approval from the other team owners. In both the 1994–95 and 1995–96 seasons, the Nets finished with identical 30–52 records. Beard was fired after the second of those two seasons.

== 1996–2001: Rebuild and rebrand ==
In an effort to start anew, Coleman and Anderson were both traded during the 1995–96 season and New Jersey hired UMass head coach John Calipari to coach the team. Kerry Kittles was selected in the 1996 NBA draft and midway through the 1996–97 season, the team traded for Sam Cassell. After a 26–56 season, the Nets made a major draft-day trade in June 1997, acquiring Keith Van Horn, Lucious Harris and two other players for Tim Thomas. The only player from the early 1990s that the Nets retained was Jayson Williams, who was developing into a rebounding specialist.

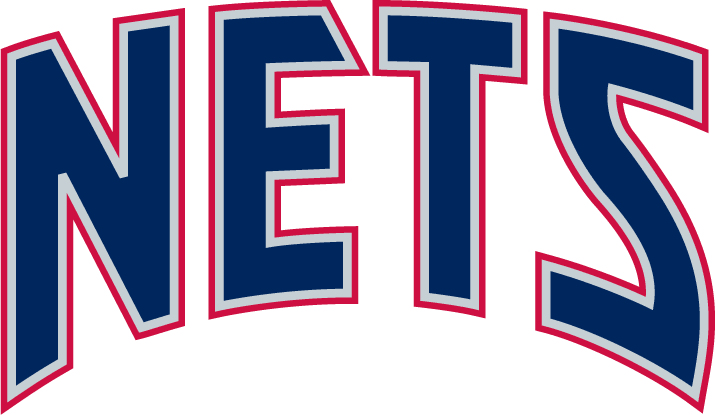
Wordmark logo used on New Jersey Nets home uniforms 1997–2012

The 1997–98 season saw several changes for the Nets. The first was a rebranding of the team that saw the ditching of the previous logo in favor of a navy blue, red and silver 3-D shield logo, designed by Patrick McDarby. The shield represented a futuristic backboard depicting the team name 'Nets' in white above a metallic basketball passing through a red hoop that the team used until their departure from New Jersey, along with a new uniform set. The second was the team's style of play, which resulted in the Nets staying in playoff contention for most of the season. The team played well under Calipari, winning 43 games and qualifying for the playoffs on the last day of the season. Power forward Jayson Williams was selected as a reserve in the 1998 NBA All-Star Game. The Nets were seeded eighth in the Conference and lost to the Chicago Bulls in the 1998 playoffs in three straight games. The Nets played well and came close to taking the first two games.

The 1998–99 season was delayed for three months due to an owners' lockout of the players. When the abbreviated 50-game season began, the Nets were a fashionable choice by experts as a surprise team after their previous run. However, Cassell was injured in the first game of the season and the team started poorly. With the Nets underachieving at 3–15, the Nets traded Cassell to the Bucks, while the Nets acquired Stephon Marbury from the Minnesota Timberwolves. After two more losses, Calipari was fired and replaced by assistant coach Don Casey. The team never recovered from its poor start to finish at 16–34. With the Nets already eliminated from playoff contention in April, Marbury collided with Williams in a game against the Atlanta Hawks; Williams broke his tibia, the second time he had suffered such an injury in two years, and would never play in the NBA again.

The team elected to retain Don Casey as head coach for the 1999–2000 season. The Nets started the season with what was then a franchise record low 2–15 record. They would improve after that, but once again, injuries plagued the team, and the Nets finished the season by losing their final 11 games of the year, finishing with a 31–51 record.

On June 2, 2000, the Nets hired as the team president Rod Thorn, a longtime NBA executive best known for drafting Michael Jordan while he was the Bulls' general manager. Immediately, he began to assemble the components of the franchise's most talented team since the ABA champions of the mid-1970s. He started by hiring former NBA star Byron Scott as coach. With the first pick in the notoriously weak 2000 draft, the Nets selected Kenyon Martin from the University of Cincinnati. Stephon Marbury and Keith Van Horn had become stars in New Jersey. Marbury made the All-NBA 3rd Team in 2000 and his very first All-Star Game in 2001. But despite his individual efforts, constant injuries hindered the team's chemistry and the Nets failed to reach to the playoffs in each of Marbury's seasons as a starter.

== 2001–2004: Making the finals ==
On the night of the 2001 draft, the Nets traded the rights to their first-round selection (Eddie Griffin) to the Houston Rockets for Richard Jefferson, Jason Collins and Brandon Armstrong, and selected Brian Scalabrine in the second round. The trade was widely considered a smart move by the Nets as they needed to get younger and clear out much of the dead weight that was on the bench, as the Nets had the lowest scoring and oldest bench in the league the previous season.

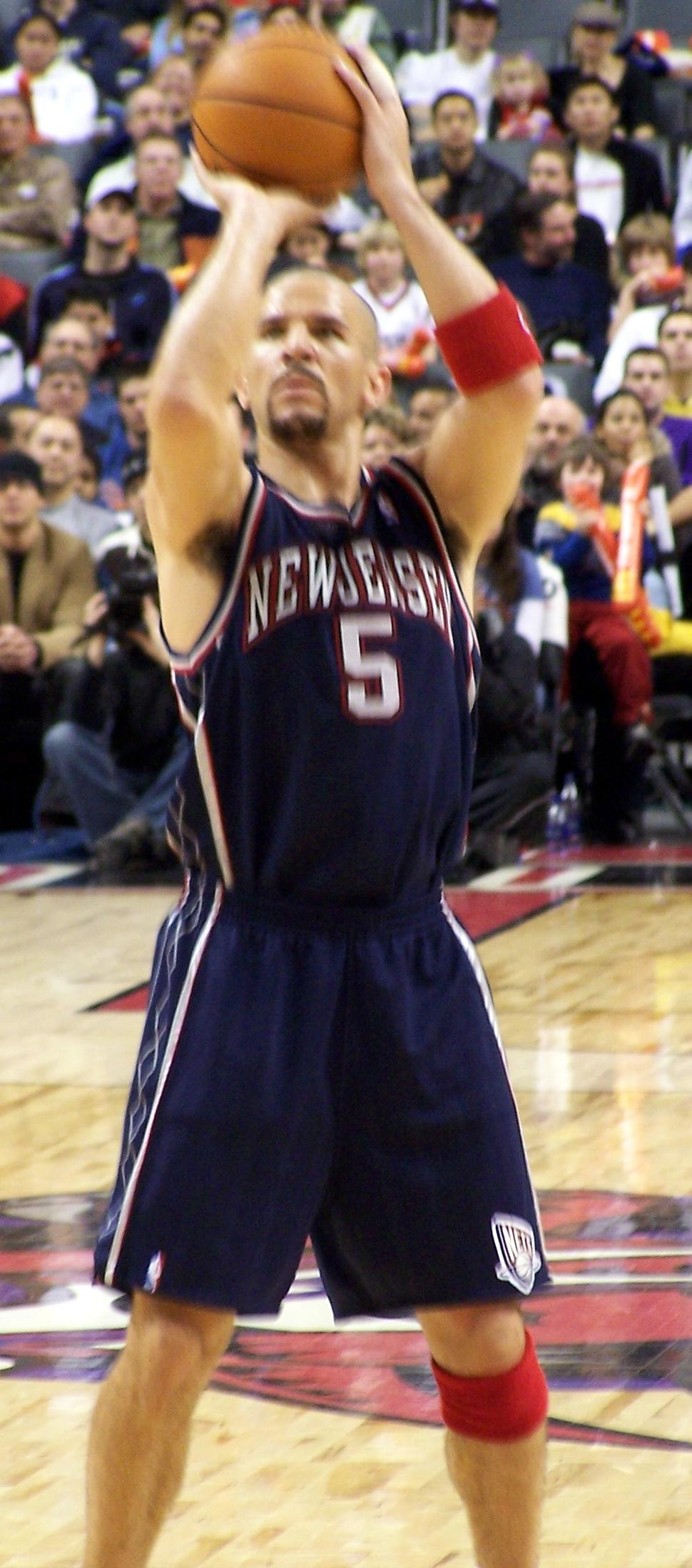
Jason Kidd was acquired by the team in a 2001 trade and led New Jersey to two NBA Finals before departing in a trade in 2008. He would return to the team in 2013 as the new head coach.

One day after the draft, on June 28, 2001, Thorn traded all-star Stephon Marbury and role player Johnny Newman to the Phoenix Suns for all-star/All-NBA point Jason Kidd and Chris Dudley (whom the Nets later released). The move gave the team something it had been lacking for practically its entire NBA existence, a floor leader who made his teammates better. They also signed Todd MacCulloch, who was coming off a solid playoff run with the 76ers in which he shot 63% from the field in 18 games. The 2001–02 season turned out to be the best season in the team's NBA history, and in the process, the Nets became one of the most exciting teams in the league. The team won its first Atlantic Division Title, finishing 52–30 and seeded first in the Eastern Conference and faced Indiana in the first round of the 2002 NBA playoffs.

After losing the first game at home, the Nets then won the next two games, before losing game four. In front of a home sellout crowd, the Nets led by nine points with five minutes left in regulation; however, Reggie Miller made a 35-foot three-pointer at the buzzer to send the game into overtime. After Miller sent the game into double-overtime with a driving dunk, the Nets pulled away for a 120–109 victory. It is the only game in NBA history to end every quarter tied.

In the conference semifinals, they defeated the Charlotte Hornets four games to one to advance to the conference finals for the first time. They faced the Boston Celtics. This series is remembered for Kidd having his left eye swollen shut diving for a loose ball in game; he received 32 stitches. After they won game one, the Nets lost game two at home. In game three, the Nets led by 21 going into the fourth, but a Celtic comeback gave the Celtics a 94–90 victory and a 2–1 series lead. In game four, played on Memorial Day afternoon in Boston, the Nets led most of the way, but the Celtics tied the game with a minute remaining. However, the Nets made enough plays at the end of the game to win—Harris made two free throws with 6.6 seconds left and when Paul Pierce missed two free throws that would have tied the game with 1 second left, the series was tied at two games each. In game five, the Nets went on a 20–1 run early in the fourth quarter to coast to a 103–92 victory and a 3–2 lead in the series. In game 6, Van Horn's three pointer off a Kittles pass with 50 seconds left in the game clinched the Nets their first conference championship, four games to two. In the 2002 NBA Finals, the Nets were swept by Shaquille O'Neal, Kobe Bryant and the Los Angeles Lakers.

Before the 2002–03 season, the Nets traded Van Horn and MacCulloch to obtain Dikembe Mutombo from the 76ers. The move to improve the team did not work, as Mutombo sat out most of the season with a wrist injury, and received little time in the playoffs due to differences with coach Byron Scott. Despite Mutombo's absence, the Nets finished 49–33 and repeated as Atlantic Division Champions. Kidd in the process had his best season ever and contributions from Kenyon Martin, Richard Jefferson, and Sixth Man of The Year runner-up Lucious Harris. In the 2003 NBA playoffs, they won their second consecutive Conference championship. They defeated the Milwaukee Bucks in the first round of the playoffs four games to two, then swept the Celtics and Detroit Pistons in consecutive series to advance to the 2003 NBA Finals, this time facing the Western Conference Champion San Antonio Spurs. They split the first four games in the series. At the same time, the Nets' home court hosted the New Jersey Devils third Stanley Cup celebration in nine years, after their 3–0 win over the Mighty Ducks of Anaheim in game 7 of the Stanley Cup Final. However, the Nets played erratically in a game 5 loss at home to go down in the series three games to two. In game 6, the Nets led the Spurs by 10 points on the road with 10 minutes remaining, but the Spurs went on a 19–0 run to take the title in six games, which denied the state of New Jersey the distinction of having both NBA and NHL titles in the same year.

After the 2003 Finals, Kidd became a free agent and the Spurs pursued him. However, Kidd re-signed with the Nets, stating that he had "unfinished business" in New Jersey. Another factor in Kidd's decision was the signing of free-agent Alonzo Mourning. But Mourning's tenure with the Nets would be disastrous, as he missed most of the 2003–04 season due to a kidney ailment.

During the 2003–04 season, New Jersey performed poorly early, and in late December head coach Byron Scott was fired. Lawrence Frank became the interim head coach in January, after serving as an assistant coach with the team since the 2000–01 season. The Nets rebounded from the early-season lull, and won a record 13 games to start Frank's coaching career, and again won the Atlantic Division title, and swept their crosstown rival Knicks in the first round. However, their run of conference finals was halted in the conference semifinals by the eventual NBA champion Detroit Pistons. After the teams split the first four games, each won a large rout at home, the Nets took game 5 in Detroit in triple-overtime, only to fall short in game 6 in New Jersey. The Pistons won game 7 in a rout and took the series four games to three. Kidd, playing on an injured knee that required surgery after the season, was held scoreless in game 7.

== 2004–2008: Kidd and Carter duo ==
After the season, the Nets revamped. They traded Kerry Kittles and Kenyon Martin to the Clippers and Nuggets respectively and released Rodney Rogers and longtime Net Lucious Harris, because new owner Bruce Ratner was unwilling to pay the remainder of their contracts. They received only draft picks in return for two key players in the team's recent success. Unbeknownst to New Jersey, however, was that Kittles had surgery for the fifth time to correct his knee, and Martin would need microfracture surgery in both knees. The 2004–05 season looked bad at first for the Nets. Kidd was recovering from his a microfracture surgery and Richard Jefferson was handed the reins to the team. They got off to a 2–11 start, and even with Kidd's return, the outlook was bleak. However, the Nets made a major deal and obtained star Vince Carter from the Toronto Raptors in exchange for Mourning, Eric Williams, Aaron Williams and draft picks. Mourning had become disgruntled, saying the Nets "betrayed" him and that New Jersey's progress to that point was not what he "signed up for". The move made the Nets major players again, as they featured one of the top 1–2–3's in the league with Kidd, Carter, and Jefferson respectively. However, it was short-lived, as Jefferson was injured against the Detroit Pistons, and required season-ending surgery.

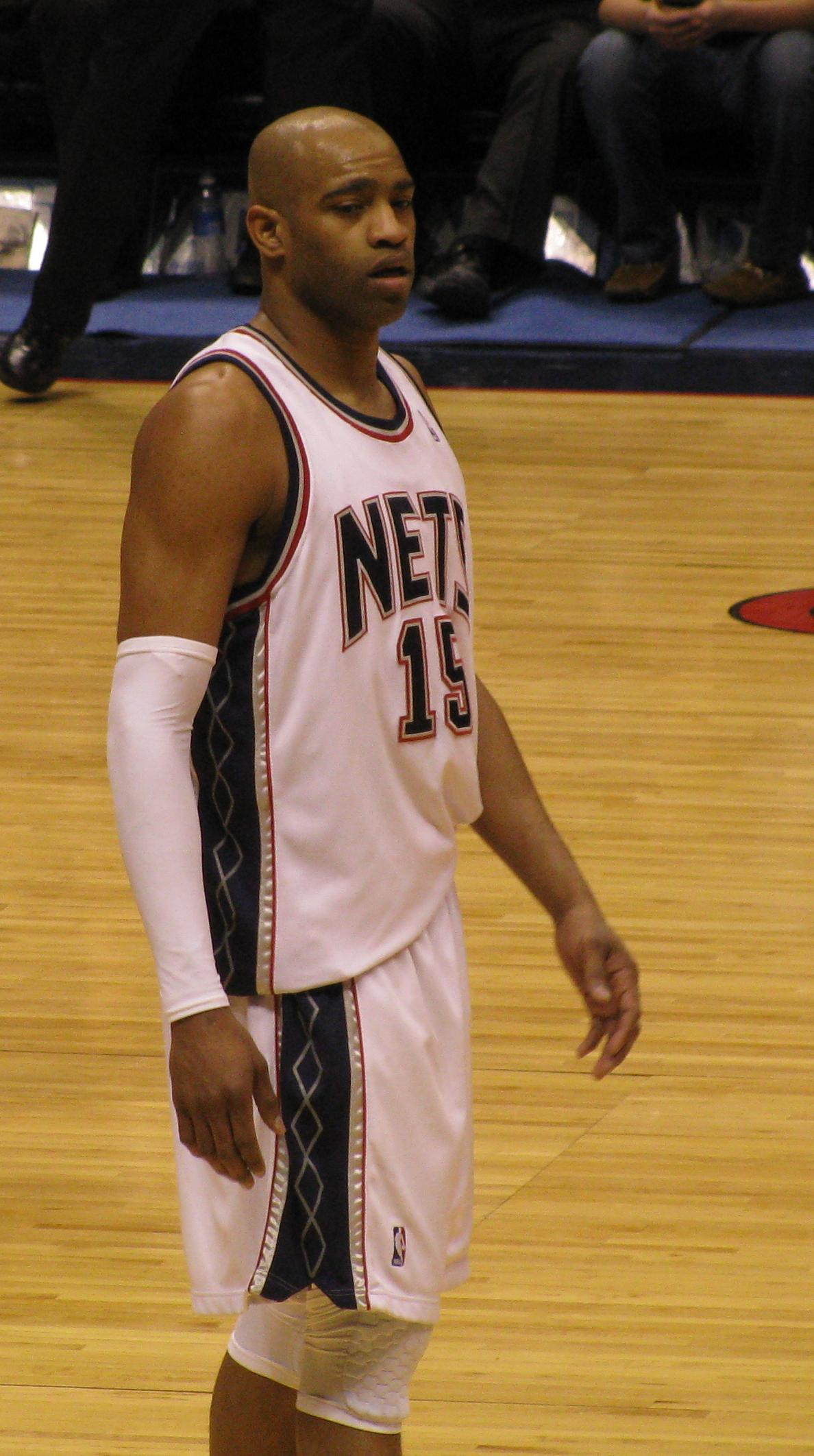
8× all-star Vince Carter arrived in New Jersey in 2004.

However, teamed with Kidd, Carter rallied the team to gain the eighth and final seed in the Eastern Conference, after being more than 10 games out of the playoffs at one point, with a win in the last game of the season. Even with Jefferson back, however, they were swept by the Heat in the first round of the 2005 NBA playoffs.

During the off-season of 2005, the Nets pursued a starting-quality power forward through free agency. They had drafted Antoine Wright, and still needed to fill a void left by Kenyon Martin.

They signed Shareef Abdur-Rahim. To offer him a more lucrative contract, they pursued a sign-and-trade with the Portland Trail Blazers. In return for Abdur-Rahim, the Nets agreed to send Portland a protected first-round pick and use their trade exception acquired from the Kittles trade. However, Thorn decided to void the trade after Abdur-Rahim failed a physical examination because of a pre-existing knee injury. Abdur-Rahim initially denied any injury and said he felt he was treated like "damaged goods". Nonetheless, the knee issue would eventually force him into retirement after the 2008 season. To fill Abdur-Rahim's slot on the roster, the Nets acquired Marc Jackson from the Sixers.

They used part of the remaining mid-level exception to re-sign Clifford Robinson for two years in response to Brian Scalabrine's departure. A back-up to Kidd was also sought and they pursued free agents such as Keyon Dooling before they signed Jeff McInnis. McInnis was a non-factor in the Nets' season due to injury and was traded.

The Nets started the 2005–06 season slowly, struggling to a 9–12 record in their first 21 games. However, behind strong play by Carter, Kidd, and Jefferson, the team won their next 10 games (their final eight games in December and first two games in January) to surge to top of the division. After the winning streak, the Nets returned to their earlier mediocre play (winning 13 of their next 29 games), but starting on March 12 the Nets won their next 14 games in a row—the longest winning streak in the NBA that season and matching the franchise record set in 2004. The streak ended on April 8, 2006, when the Nets lost to the Cavaliers 108–102 at home. However, they also set a team record with 20 road victories that season.

The Nets finished the regular season with a 49–33 record. They clinched their fourth Atlantic Division championship in the last five seasons and the third seed in the conference playoffs, playing the Indiana Pacers in the first round of the 2006 NBA playoffs. They defeated the Pacers and advanced to the second round, where they played the Heat, in a rematch of 2005's first-round Eastern Conference loss. On May 16, 2006, the Nets lost the best-of-seven series 4–1 to the Heat. Nets fans were left to wonder what might have been as Cliff Robinson, one of the team's key defenders against Shaq, was suspended after game 1 of that series for failing a drug test.

Highlights of the season include the naming of Vince Carter to the All-Star Team in 2006. Originally named as a reserve, an injury to Jermaine O'Neal elevated Carter to a starting position. Kidd, meanwhile, was named to the NBA All-Defensive team at the end of the season.

The 2006–07 season initially fared poorly for the Nets, as they suffered a barrage of injuries starting in the preseason to mid-December. Many experts predicted they would win the Atlantic easily (Charles Barkley went as far as to say the Nets would win the Eastern Conference), but the season did not turn out as hoped. The Nets finished the regular season at .500 (41–41) and lost the Atlantic Division title to the surprising Toronto Raptors. The early-season loss of Nenad Krstić to a freak knee injury and the two-month absence of Richard Jefferson caused by an ankle injury caused the Nets to stumble mid-season. However, Jefferson went back into action on March 9 against Houston and helped the Nets regain a winning momentum, allowing them to win 10 of their last 13 games. Among the highlights of the regular season were the naming of Kidd and Carter to the '07 East All-Star team and Kidd's selection to the 2007 All-Defensive 2nd Team. The team finished with the 6th seed in the East and faced the third-seeded Toronto Raptors, feeding their newly developed rivalry. The Nets beat the Raptors in six games thanks in part to the fourth-quarter heroics of Richard Jefferson on both ends of the floor lifting them to a one-point victory. Many sportswriters picked the Nets to beat Cleveland and advance to the conference finals, but their playoff run ended in the following round as they fell to the LeBron James-led Cleveland Cavaliers 4–2 in the best-of-seven series. It turned out to be the final NBA playoff game in the state of New Jersey. During their runs for the NBA title, New Jersey had been eliminated by three of the last four conference champions, two of whom went on to win the title. In the 2007 NBA draft, the Nets used the 17th pick to pick "troubled" Boston College player Sean Williams.

The 2007–08 season started with optimism. With Krstić returning from injury and the additions of All-Star center Jamaal Magloire and first-round pick Sean Williams (who was regarded as the best shot blocker in his draft class), the Nets were anticipated to remain a contender in the East. Early injuries to Carter and Krstić disrupted the Nets season. The situation did not improve much, and the season ended up being filled with negatives: a nine-game losing streak for the Nets, a controversy in regards to Jason Kidd skipping a game due to a migraine, the trading of their franchise player, and not making it to the postseason for the first time in seven years. On February 19, 2008, Jason Kidd, Malik Allen, and Antoine Wright were traded to the Dallas Mavericks for future Nets All-Star Devin Harris, Keith Van Horn, Maurice Ager, DeSagana Diop, Trenton Hassell, $3 million, and 2008 and 2010 first-round draft picks. However, despite young players like Josh Boone and Sean Williams becoming major contributors and Marcus Williams showing progress, there were few bright notes. Other noteworthy feats included Jefferson's rank as number nine in scoring for the season, Carter's emergence as the leader of the Nets, and Carter's average of at least 20 points, 5 rebounds, and 5 assists a game, a season accomplishment unique to him, Kobe Bryant, and LeBron James. After the team failed to make the playoffs, team president Rod Thorn promised changes would be made. Coach Lawrence Frank vowed that "a season like this will never happen again" under his tenure. But it would, under Frank and the coaches that followed him, during the team’s last 5 years in New Jersey.

== 2008–2012: Final seasons in New Jersey ==
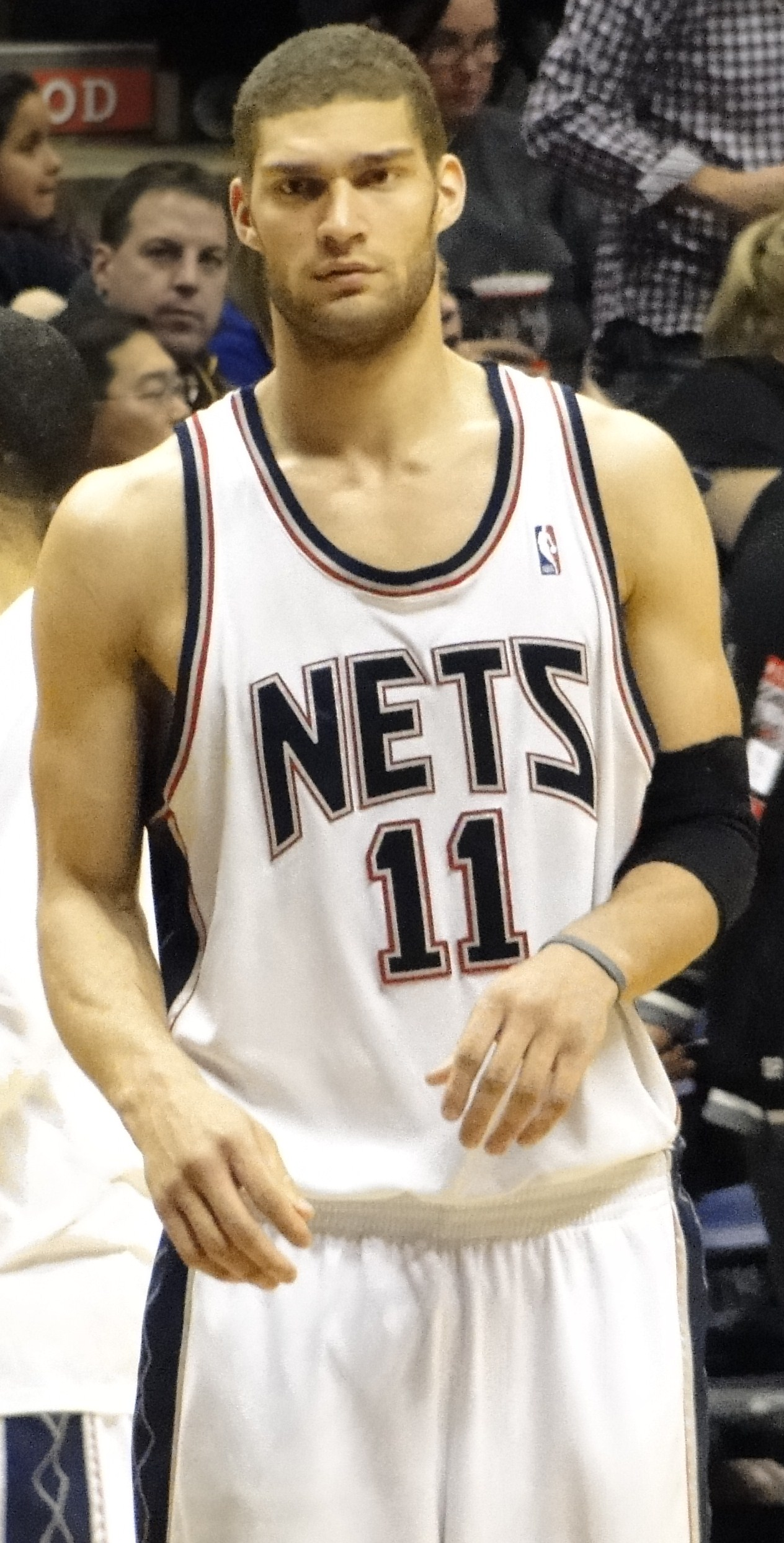
Brook Lopez in 2010

The off-season was busy for the Nets. On June 26, 2008, Richard Jefferson was traded to the Milwaukee Bucks for Yi Jianlian and Bobby Simmons. Jefferson's departure, along with that of Jason Kidd earlier that year, marked the beginning of a new era in the Garden State. The Nets signed draftees Brook Lopez and Ryan Anderson, along with Chris Douglas-Roberts. The Nets filled out their youthful roster by signing veterans Eduardo Nájera and Jarvis Hayes, and trading for Orlando point guard Keyon Dooling. The Nets finished the season with their second straight 34–48 record, tied for 11th in the Eastern Conference with the Milwaukee Bucks. Devin Harris made his first All-Star team and narrowly missed winning the NBA Most Improved Player award, and Brook Lopez finished third in Rookie of the Year voting.

On June 26, 2009, the Nets traded Vince Carter and Ryan Anderson to the Orlando Magic for Rafer Alston, Courtney Lee and Tony Battie.

After a 16th straight loss (against the Sacramento Kings) to start the 2009–10 season, the Nets fired head coach Lawrence Frank. Assistant coach Tom Barrise stepped in as a temporary replacement. He lost his first two games heading the team, an away game against the Los Angeles Lakers and then to the Dallas Mavericks at home, to set the mark for worst start to a season in NBA history at 0–18 (one more than the previous record holder, the 1988–89 Miami Heat). Kiki Vandeweghe replaced him as head coach on December 4, with Del Harris hired as his new assistant. The duo won their first game at home against the Charlotte Bobcats, 97–91, to break the Nets 19-game losing streak stretching from the final game of the 2008–09 season, and to keep the record for worst start to a season at 18 straight.

On March 29, 2010, the Nets defeated the San Antonio Spurs for the first time since the 2003 NBA Finals. The win was their 10th of the season, keeping them out of the record books for the worst season of all time, a distinction held by the 2011–12 Charlotte Bobcats. Still, the Nets finished with a 12–70 record, becoming only the fifth team to lose 70 games in a season, shared by the 1972–73 Philadelphia 76ers (9–73), 1986–87 Los Angeles Clippers (12–70), 1992–93 Dallas Mavericks (11–71) and 1997–98 Denver Nuggets (11–71).

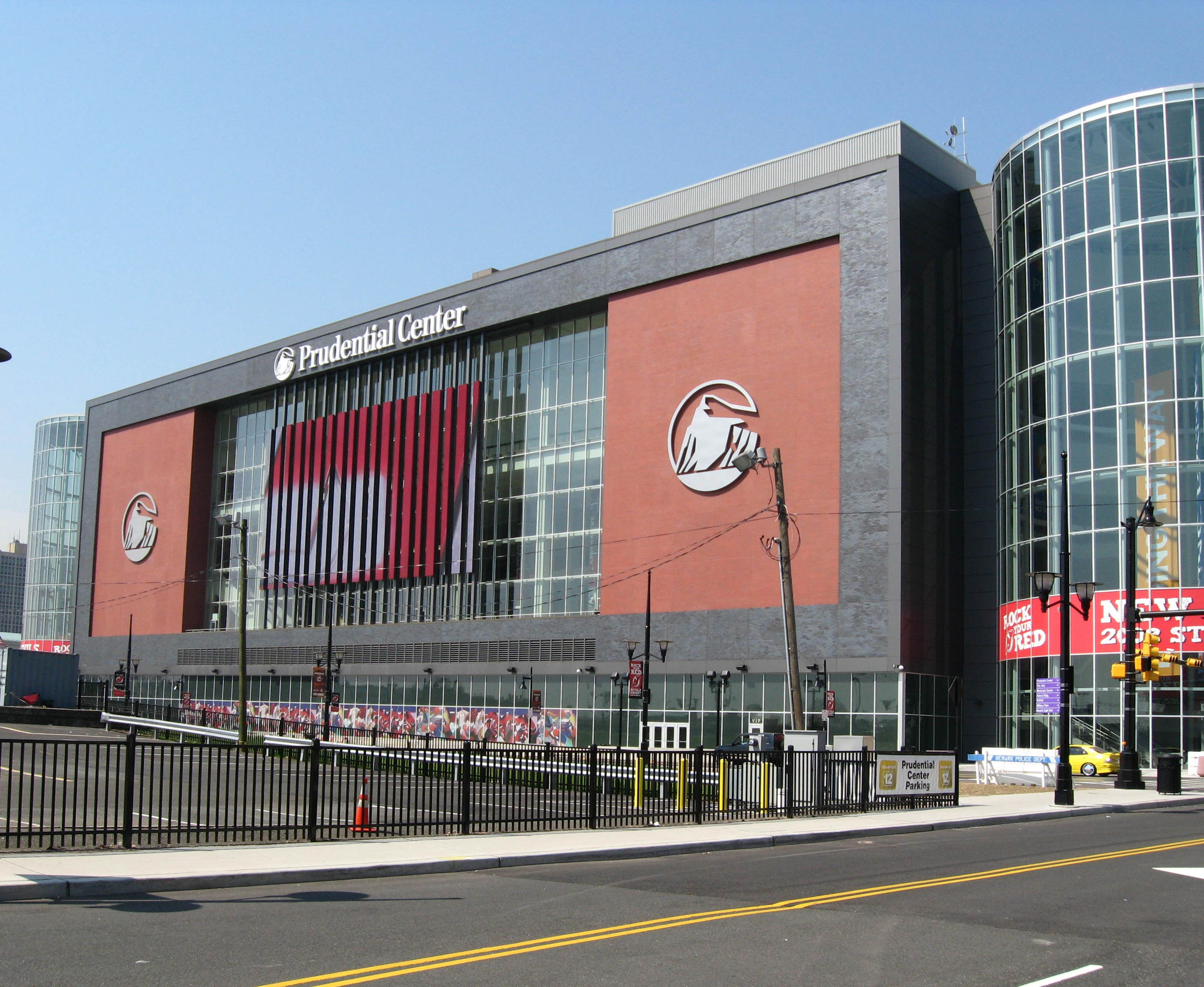
The Nets moved to Prudential Center in Newark in the 2010–11 season. It served as their temporary home until the move to the Barclays Center in Brooklyn in 2012.

On February 18, 2010, the Nets finalized a deal that would move them to Prudential Center in Newark, New Jersey. The Nets would begin playing in Newark in the 2010–11 season and remain there until Barclays Center opened in Brooklyn. There was significant optimism going into the off-season, especially as the Nets began promoting their "It's All New" campaign while looking forward to a new home, new owner, new coach, and new players. They also held the best chance of landing the top pick in the 2010 NBA draft, with which John Wall was eventually drafted. However, luck would once again not be on the Nets' side, as on May 18, 2010, the Nets received the third overall pick in the draft; they selected Derrick Favors, a power forward out of Georgia Tech.

On June 10, 2010, Avery Johnson was named the new head coach. Sam Mitchell was named assistant coach shortly thereafter. With owners Mikhail Prokhorov and Jay-Z, general manager Rod Thorn, and Johnson, who at that point had the best winning percentage of any coach in NBA history, on board, the Nets headed into the free agency period with millions in salary cap space and optimistic that they would be able to attract top free agents. They courted LeBron James, Dwyane Wade, and Chris Bosh to sign with the team and had cap space to sign at least one of them; however, all three signed with the Miami Heat. The Nets' biggest off-season acquisition turned out to be Travis Outlaw, who had a poor year for the team and was waived with the amnesty clause after the season.

Also, Rod Thorn, the team's long-time president who built the successful Nets teams of the early 2000s, resigned on June 25, 2010. In July, Billy King was named as his replacement.

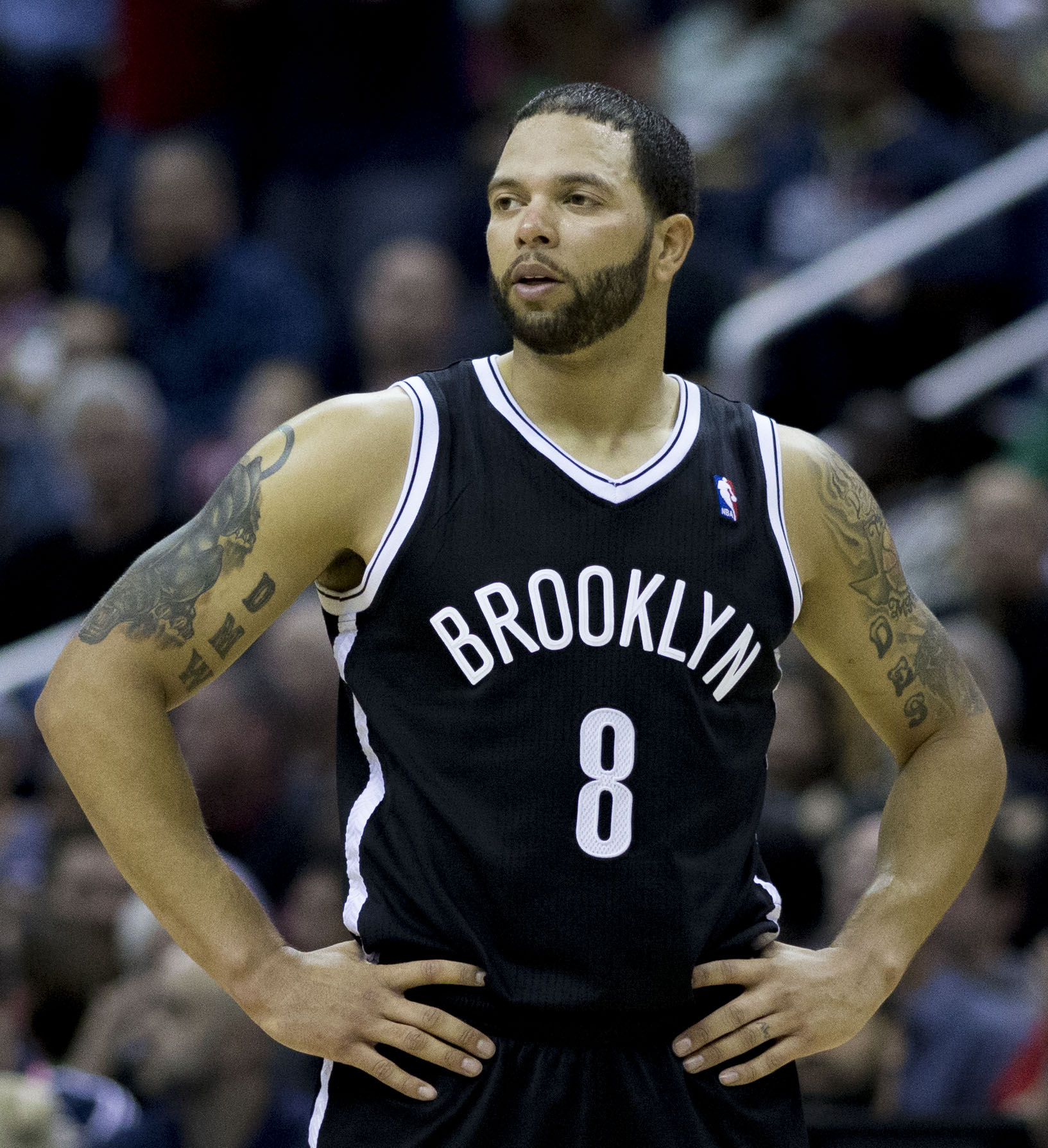
All-star point guard Deron Williams

The Nets started their first season in Newark poorly. Part of the reason was the distractions created by trade rumors regarding Carmelo Anthony, who many presumed wanted to leave the Denver Nuggets. With the entire team except Brook Lopez, Sasha Vujacic and Jordan Farmar rumored to be part of a proposed trade for Anthony at some point, the team struggled to a 17–40 record at the All-Star Break, when Anthony was finally traded to the cross-river rival New York Knicks. However, a week later, on February 23, 2011, the Nets made a surprising trade for All-Star point guard Deron Williams. The trade sent Devin Harris and rookie Derrick Favors to the Utah Jazz along with draft picks from the Golden State Warriors and cash considerations. The team went on to lose the first three games with Williams in the lineup, and then win five straight. However, Williams was hampered by a wrist injury that forced him to sit for most of the last games of the season; they won two more games, and finished with a 24–58 record.

Hoping to make the playoffs in the lockout-shortened 2011–12 season in order to convince Deron Williams to stay with the team, the Nets nonetheless suffered a major blow to their aspirations when center Brook Lopez suffered a stress fracture in his right foot in the team's second preseason game and missed all but five games in the season. That injury was the first of many, and Nets players ended up leading the NBA with 248 games missed due to injury and illness for the season. The team lost six players to season-ending injuries and fielded 25 different starting lineups over the course of the season.

The Nets never recovered from their injury issues, and the team floundered, opening with nine losses in their first 11 games and ending their season with a record of 22–44 and out of the playoffs for a fifth straight season. Furthermore, the team was again distracted by trade rumors, this time concerning Dwight Howard. The bright spots for the season included the resurgence of former D-Leaguer Gerald Green, whom the Nets acquired on February 27, 2012. At the trade deadline, the team also acquired Gerald Wallace from the Portland Trail Blazers, who provided energy and defense from the forward positions down the stretch.

On April 23, 2012, the Nets played their last game in New Jersey, losing to the Philadelphia 76ers by a score of 105–87 in front of a sold-out crowd of 18,711 at Prudential Center. They played their last game as the New Jersey Nets in Toronto on April 26, 2012, and lost in a 98–67 blowout to the Toronto Raptors. Johan Petro scored the final points in New Jersey Nets history on a 20-foot, left-side jumper with 24.9 seconds left on the clock.

== 2012: Returning to New York ==
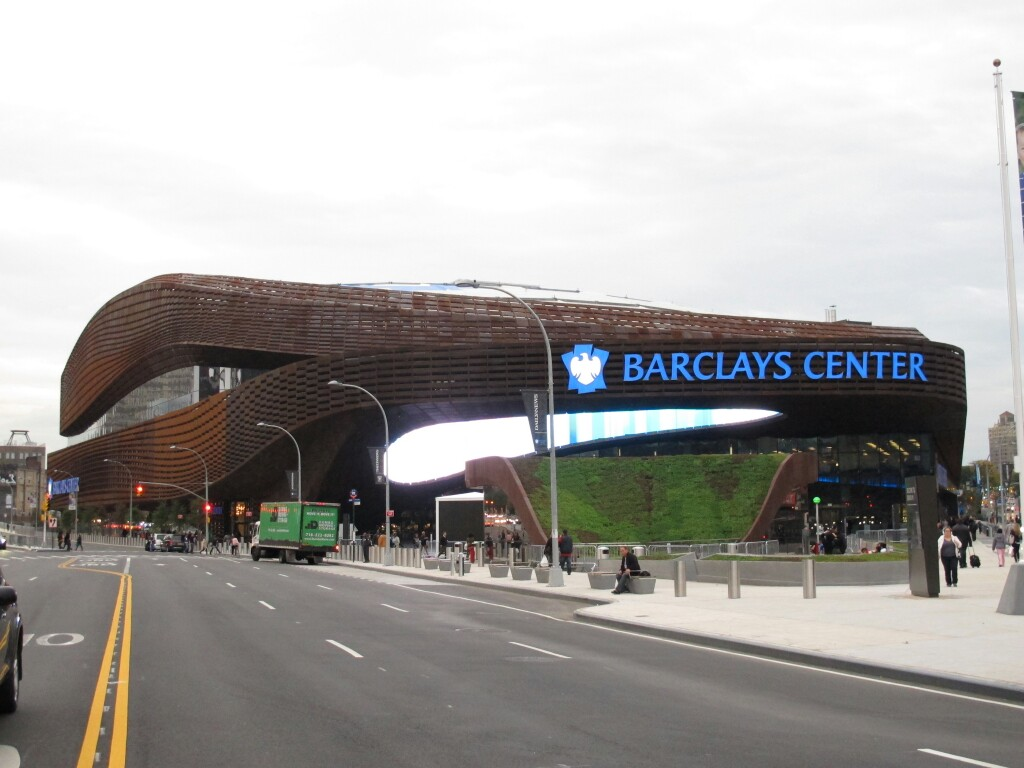
Barclays Center, the home of the Brooklyn Nets

In 2004, after failing to secure a deal for a new arena in Newark, New Jersey (eventually a new arena, the Prudential Center, was built in Newark for the New Jersey Devils), the YankeeNets sold the franchise to a group headed by real estate developer Bruce Ratner for $300 million, beating out a group led by Charles Kushner and Jon Corzine. While Kushner and Corzine wanted to keep the Nets in New Jersey, Ratner planned to move the team back to New York. In 2005, the Nets announced plans to locate the team in the Prospect Heights neighborhood of Brooklyn. The new arena, later named Barclays Center, would be the center of an extensive redevelopment project called the Atlantic Yards being constructed by Ratner's real estate development company. The new arena is located across the street from the site that Walter O'Malley wanted to use for a new stadium for the Brooklyn Dodgers in the early 1950s. That plan was rejected and resulted in the team's move to Los Angeles in 1958. The Nets would not only return to New York for the first time since 1977 but also became the first major professional sports team to play home games in Brooklyn since the departure of the Dodgers. After the dismissal of major pending lawsuits, groundbreaking for Barclays Center occurred on March 11, 2010.

On September 26, 2011, Jay-Z, the Nets' minority owner, announced that the team's new name after the move to Brooklyn would be the Brooklyn Nets. The team officially became the Brooklyn Nets on April 30, 2012. The team's new colors were announced to be black and white, and two official logos designed by Timothy Morris were unveiled. The primary logo is a shield depicting the team name 'Nets', along with a basketball with an overlaid "B". The secondary logo is the same "B-ball" surrounded by a black circle with the text "Brooklyn" and "New York". The new logo's typeface and colors are meant to evoke New York City Subway rollsigns from the 1950s when Brooklyn last had a major league sports team. This rebranding of the team led to a dramatic increase in merchandise sales for the team. On the first two days that the new merchandise was available, total sales from the NBA Store were 10 times that of a typical year when the team was in New Jersey, and in the initial months of the 2012–13 season, the Nets led all NBA teams in apparel sales.

== 2012–2015: New era in Brooklyn and playoff contention ==
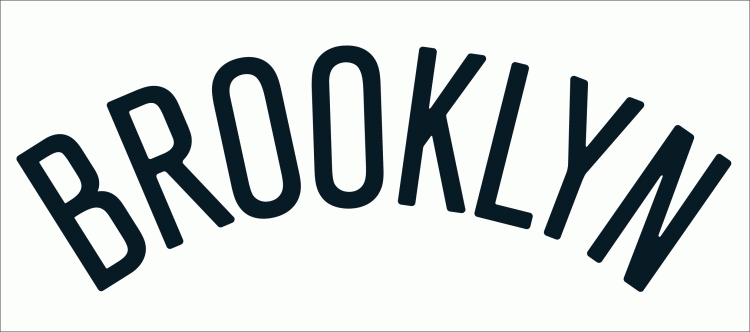
Brooklyn Nets wordmark

In the 2012 NBA draft, Brooklyn selected İlkan Karaman, and traded for the duo of Tyshawn Taylor and Tornike Shengelia for cash. On June 29, 2012, Dwight Howard of the Orlando Magic met with the Magic's new general manager, Rob Hennigan, in Los Angeles and demanded a trade to the Brooklyn Nets. However, once again the trade was not able to materialize, and the Nets reportedly pulled out of trade discussions on July 11, 2012. Instead, the team traded for six-time All-Star Joe Johnson from the Atlanta Hawks. In return, the Nets sent Jordan Farmar, Johan Petro, Anthony Morrow, Jordan Williams, DeShawn Stevenson and a draft pick previously acquired from the Houston Rockets to Atlanta. On the same date, Deron Williams signed a five-year, $98.7 million deal to remain with the Nets. In addition, the Nets re-signed Brook Lopez and Gerald Wallace to four-year deals.

The Brooklyn Nets played their first game on November 3, 2012, in a 107–100 home victory over the Toronto Raptors. The first game was originally scheduled to be against the crosstown New York Knicks; however, that game was postponed to November 26 due to effects of Hurricane Sandy, and the rescheduled game was won by the Nets in a 96–89 overtime victory in front of a sold-out crowd at Barclays Center. The Nets started the season strong, going 11–4 in the month of November, and as a result, Avery Johnson won Coach of the Month for the Eastern Conference. However, in an abrupt turn of fortunes, a rough stretch in December in which Brooklyn went 3–10 led to Johnson being fired as head coach, with assistant coach P. J. Carlesimo being named interim head coach until a replacement was hired. Johnson's firing proved to be a spark for the team as Brooklyn caught fire once more, going 11–4 in January, and heading into the All-Star break with a record of 31–22. Center Brook Lopez was selected to his first All-Star Game as the Nets' lone representation at the game.

Riding a strong second half of the season from Deron Williams, the Nets clinched their first playoff berth since the 2006–07 season on March 21, 2013. On April 3, 2013, Brooklyn ended an eight-game road trip by beating the Cleveland Cavaliers 113–95 for the team's 21st road win, clinching the first winning season on the road in the franchise's NBA history. Brooklyn played its first ever playoff series in the borough versus the Chicago Bulls. After defeating the undermanned Bulls in a blowout in game 1, the Nets then proceeded to lose Games 2 and 3 before giving up a 17-point lead in the final minutes of the fourth quarter in game 4 and losing in overtime. The Nets won the next two games, only to lose game 7 in Brooklyn. With the season over, the Nets announced that Carlesimo would not return as head coach.

To replace Carlesimo, the Nets hired Jason Kidd, who was one week removed from retiring as a player, to become their new head coach on June 12, 2013. To aid in Kidd's transition from player to coach, former Nets head coach Lawrence Frank was brought back to be his lead assistant coach, along with a staff of Roy Rogers, Eric Hughes, John Welch, Joe Prunty and Charles Klask.

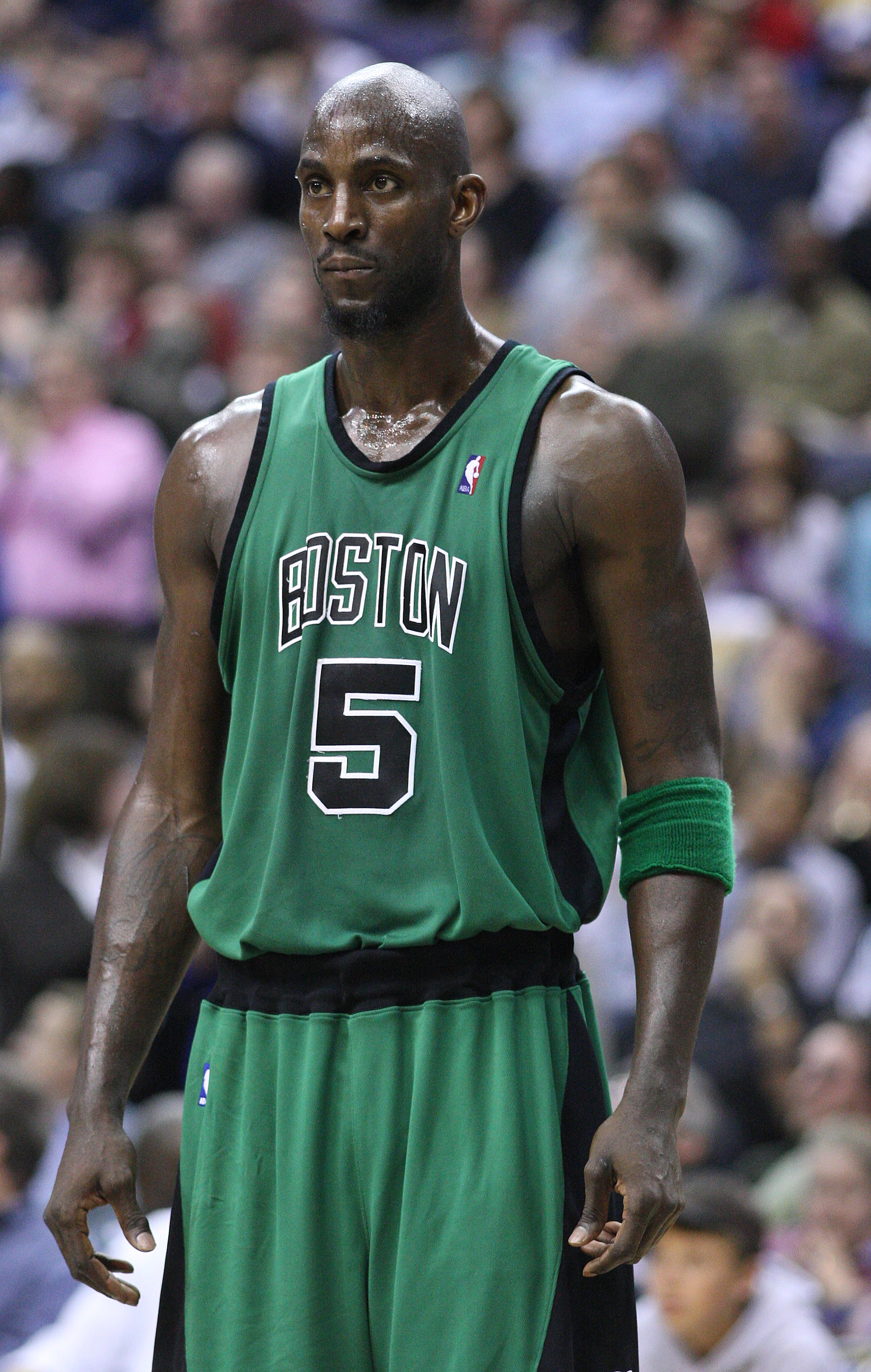
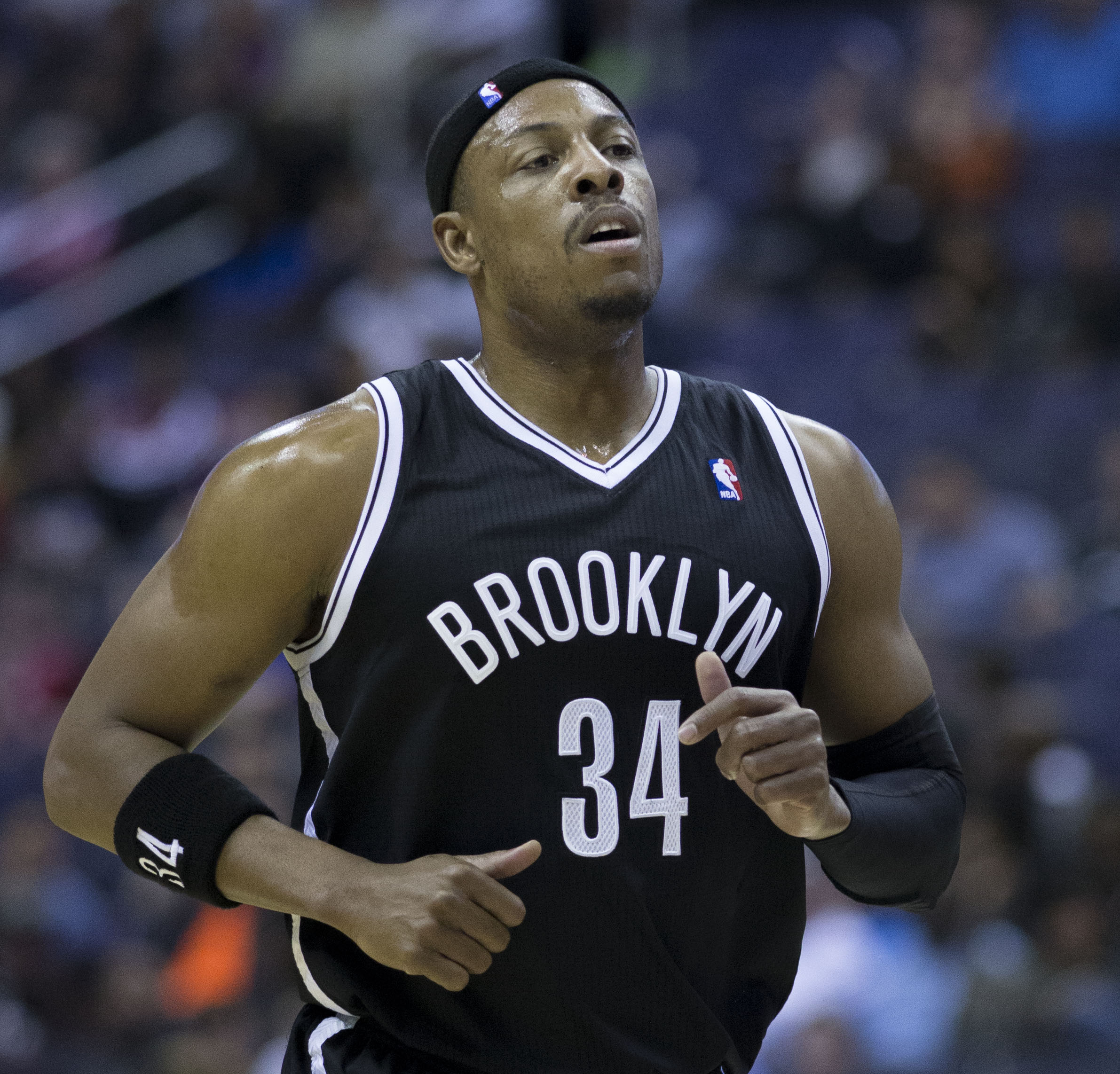
The acquiring of Kevin Garnett (left) and Paul Pierce (right) led to great expectations for the Nets in the 2013–14 season.

On June 27, 2013, the Nets and the Boston Celtics agreed in principle on a blockbuster trade (finalized July 12), dealing Kris Humphries, Gerald Wallace, MarShon Brooks, Keith Bogans (in a sign-and-trade), and Kris Joseph, along with three first-round draft picks (2014, 2016, 2018) and an option to swap the 2017 first-round pick, for Paul Pierce, Kevin Garnett, Jason Terry, and DJ White. This created a starting lineup that had a combined 35 All-Star appearances, with Deron Williams, Joe Johnson, Pierce, Garnett, and Brook Lopez together forming a new NBA "superteam". The Nets also signed Alan Anderson, Shaun Livingston, All-Star Andrei Kirilenko, and first-round draft pick Mason Plumlee to add further depth to the bench. With all of its off-season moves, Brooklyn ended up with a league-high payroll of $102 million, in addition to having projected luxury tax payments totaling $86 million.

The 2013–14 season started poorly for the Nets, with rookie coach Jason Kidd facing difficulties adjusting to his new job, and with injuries affecting the team's ability to field a consistent lineup. The team struggled to a disappointing 10–21 through December, and lead assistant coach Lawrence Frank was demoted to writing daily reports due to a fallout between him and Kidd. The season bottomed out on December 21 when Brook Lopez was announced to require season-ending foot surgery for the second time in three years. Lopez's injury forced Kidd to change his starting lineup, with the coach choosing to start Paul Pierce at power forward and Joe Johnson at small forward, and play two point guards simultaneously. This move would turn the Nets' season around. The team started winning, going 10–3 in January 2014 as Kidd won his first Coach of the Month award.

Kidd was awarded a second Coach of the Month award on April 1 after the team amassed a 12–4 record in March. On the same day the Nets would go on to defeat the Houston Rockets 105–96 to extend a franchise record home winning streak to 14, and clinching a playoff berth in the process. On April 8, the Nets became the first team during the Miami Big 3 (Chris Bosh, LeBron James, and Dwyane Wade) era to sweep the Heat in a 4-game season series.

On May 4, 2014, the Nets defeated the Toronto Raptors in the first round of the 2014 playoffs with a 104–103 victory in game 7. With the win, Jason Kidd became the first rookie coach to win a game 7 in NBA history. It also marked the first game 7 win in Nets' franchise history. The Nets' season ended with a 96–94 loss in game 5 of the conference semifinals against the Heat, the team they swept in the regular season. On May 22, Plumlee was named to the NBA All-Rookie First Team.

On July 1, 2014, the Milwaukee Bucks secured Kidd's coaching rights from the Nets in exchange for two second-round draft picks in 2015 and 2019. On July 2, 2014, Lionel Hollins and the Nets reached an agreement on a four-year, $18 million contract for him to serve as the team's next head coach. On July 7, 2014, he was officially introduced by the Nets at a press conference.

The Nets barely squeezed into the playoffs in Hollins' first season, nosing out the Pacers for the last playoff spot on the last day of the season. However, they pushed the top-seeded Hawks to six games in the first round.

== 2016–2018: Struggles and rebuilding ==
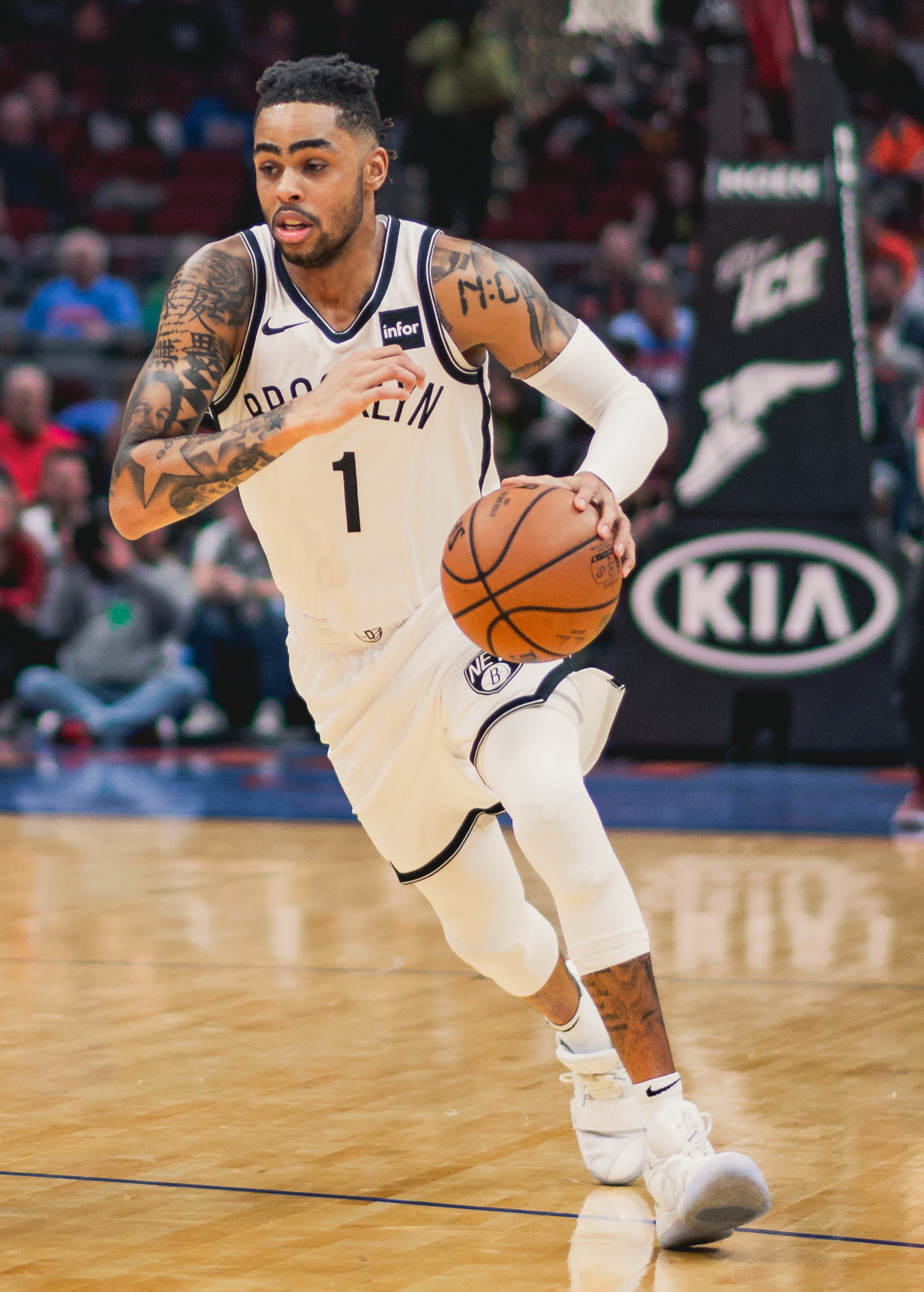
D'Angelo Russell was named an All-Star in 2019

The bottom quickly fell out for the Nets a year later. They did not get their first win until the eighth game of the season. By the start of 2016, they were 9–23. After waiving Joe Johnson and Deron Williams, on January 10, 2016, the Nets announced that they had parted ways with head coach Lionel Hollins and general manager Billy King. Tony Brown became interim head coach, while former Spurs assistant general manager Sean Marks became general manager. Marks made clear that his vision included a rebuilding process that would take years to execute, something that Prokhorov acknowledged. In an open letter he wrote on Yahoo! Sports in February 2016, Prokhorov apologized for his previous free-spending approach, saying that he now realized it was not the best way to build a champion.

In April 2016, the Nets hired former Knicks and Hawks assistant Kenny Atkinson as the new head coach. In the summer of 2016, the team sought to rebuild by acquiring Randy Foye, Anthony Bennett, Trevor Booker, and Jeremy Lin. However, the Nets fell below even the lowest of expectations when they secured a league-worst 8–33 record at the midway point of the season, and an 11-game losing streak with a 119–109 loss to the Raptors. The streak was the longest since their 0–18 start in the 2009–2010 season. This was partly because starting point guard Jeremy Lin had missed 29 of the 41 games played up until that point with a hamstring injury. On January 9, 2017, the Nets waived Anthony Bennett and was replaced by Quincy Acy who was given a 10-day contract. They ultimately finished 20–62, the worst record in the league. Additionally, as part of the deal that brought them Pierce and Garnett four years earlier, they had to swap their 2017 first-round pick with the Celtics.

On June 20, 2017, the Nets traded Lopez and a 2017 first-round pick to the Lakers in exchange for D'Angelo Russell and Timofey Mozgov. The Nets finished the 2017–18 season with a 28–54 record, missing the playoffs for the third consecutive season.

During this time, the four picks Brooklyn traded to Boston for Garnett and Pierce would turn into Marcus Smart, Jaylen Brown, Jayson Tatum and Collin Sexton. Brown and Tatum have been named All-Stars for the Celtics, while Marcus Smart has won the NBA Defensive Player of the Year Award.

== 2018–2023: Return to success, the Durant and Irving era ==
On June 20, 2018, the Nets traded Mozgov, the 45th pick in the 2018 NBA draft and a 2019 second-round pick for Dwight Howard, who was later waived. The trade cleared salary cap room for the summer of 2019.

In February 2019, Russell became the first Nets' player since Joe Johnson in 2014 to make an NBA All-Star team. With a team led by Russell, recent draft picks Jarrett Allen and Caris LeVert, and NBA G League pickups Spencer Dinwiddie and Joe Harris, the Nets exceeded expectations in the 2018–19 season, and made the 2019 NBA playoffs, with a 42–40 record as the sixth seed. They went on to lose to the 76ers in five games in the first round.

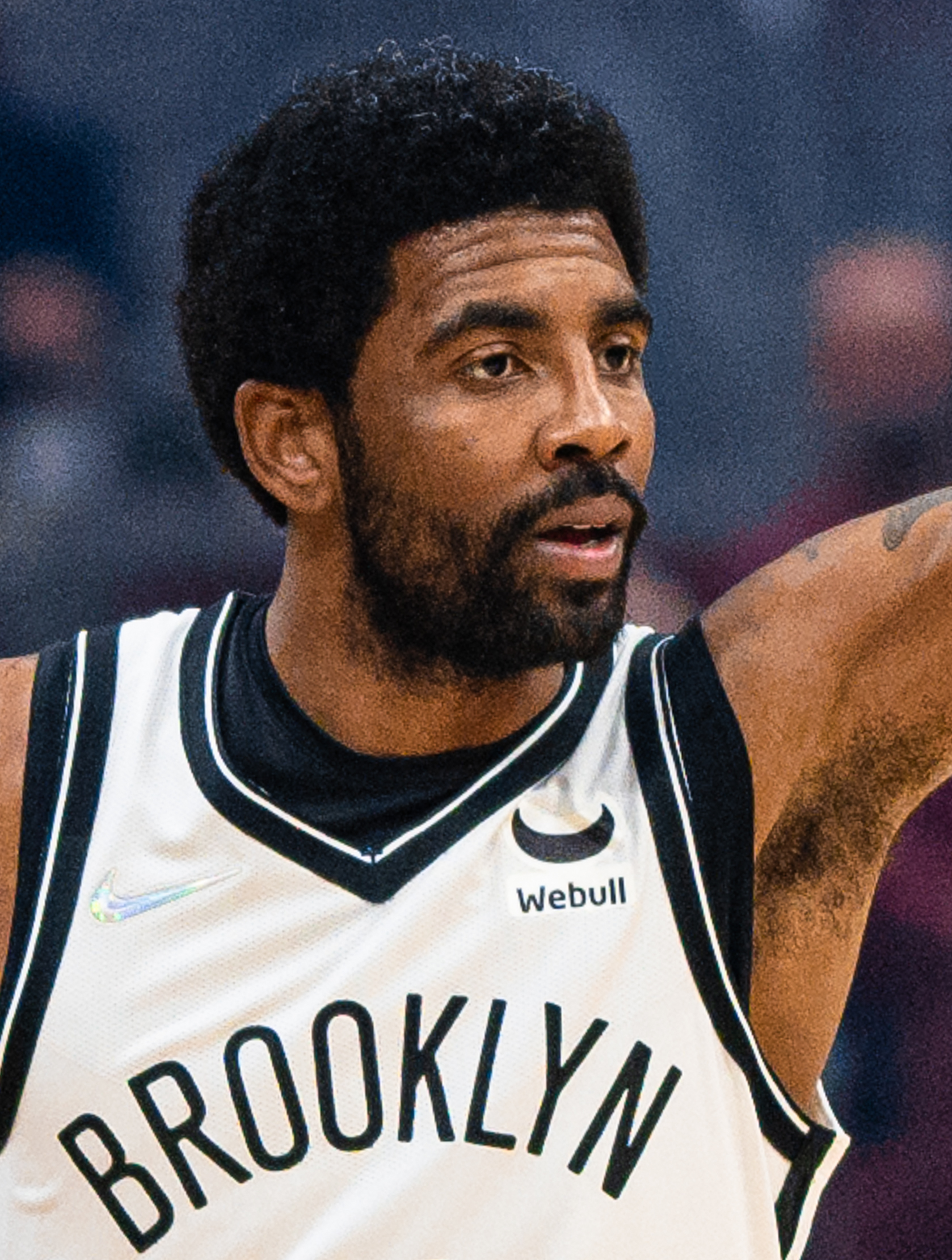
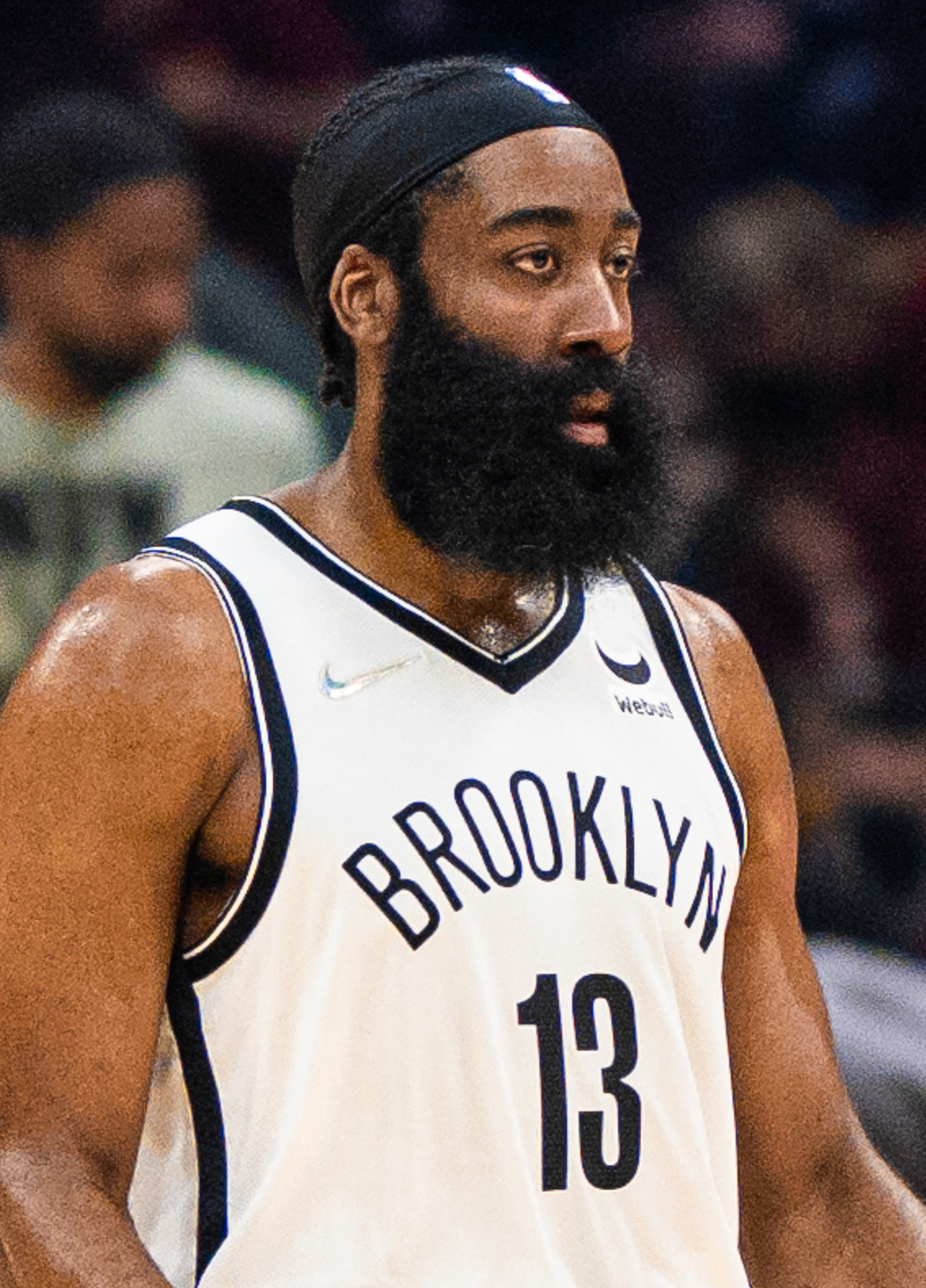
The trio of superstars Kevin Durant (left), Kyrie Irving (center), and James Harden (right) positioned the Nets as a top NBA contender.

On June 30, 2019, former MVP Kevin Durant announced his intentions to sign with the Nets after the July moratorium ended on July 6. Durant signed with Brooklyn on July 7, 2019, in a sign-and-trade deal. However, Durant spent the entire 2019-20 NBA season on injured reserve and did not suit up for the Nets. With the addition of Durant, the Nets also signed six-time All-Star and two-time All-NBA point guard Kyrie Irving, who would play in 20 games and miss 26 games before a season-ending surgery on his shoulder. After the suspension of the 2019–20 NBA season, the Nets were one of the 22 teams invited to the NBA Bubble to participate in the final eight games of the regular season. Facing a challenging task of playing without seven players on the roster, including leading scorers Irving and Dinwiddie, the Nets surprisingly played well and clinched their second straight playoff berth after going 5–3 in the NBA Bubble. The shorthanded Nets lost 4–0 in the first round to the Toronto Raptors in the 2020 NBA playoffs.

The Nets hired retired Hall of Fame point guard Steve Nash to be their head coach in the 2020 off-season to replace Kenny Atkinson who resigned midway through the previous season. After the 14 games into the 2020–21 season, the Nets acquired former MVP James Harden from the Houston Rockets, while trading away Jarrett Allen, Caris LeVert and others in a four-team trade, creating a "Big Three" superstars lineup with Harden, Durant and Irving. In his debut for the Nets, Harden became the first player in franchise history, and just the seventh player in NBA history, to record a triple-double in their team debut. In February, both Durant, who was also named captain for one of the teams, and Irving were named as starters for the 2021 NBA All-Star Game, while Harden was announced as a reserve, the first time the Nets had three players named to the All-Star game in a single season. In March, the Nets signed former six-time All-Star Blake Griffin and seven-time All-Star LaMarcus Aldridge for the rest of the season after buyouts from the Detroit Pistons and San Antonio Spurs, respectively. However, Aldridge was forced to retire after appearing in five games with the Nets due to health concerns. The Nets clinched a playoff berth for the third straight year with their April 27 victory over the Toronto Raptors, becoming the first Eastern Conference team, and second overall to do so. The Nets faced the Boston Celtics in the first round of the 2021 NBA playoffs, defeating them in five games. The Nets then faced the Milwaukee Bucks in the conference semifinals and lost the series in seven games, a matchup defined by injuries and razor-thin margins: Irving sprained his right ankle in game 4 after landing on Giannis Antetokounmpo's foot and missed the remainder of the series; Harden strained his right hamstring 43 seconds into game 1 and, though he returned in game 5, played limited by the injury; and in game 7, Durant's last-second jumper was ruled a two because his toe was on the line—tying the game instead of winning it—before Brooklyn fell in overtime. Several outlets later characterized the series as a major “what if” for Brooklyn, noting Irving’s ankle injury, Harden’s hamstring strain, and Durant’s toe-on-the-line shot in game 7; some argued the Nets might have been favorites against Atlanta Hawks in the conference finals had they advanced.

On October 12, 2021, the Nets' general manager Sean Marks announced that Irving would be ineligible to play or practice with the team, due to the New York City COVID-19 vaccine mandate, until Irving was vaccinated. Irving refused, and on December 17—after the Nets lost players to injuries and health-and-safety protocols, and an inordinate minutes load on Kevin Durant and James Harden—the Nets announced that Irving would return to the team as a part-time player for games outside of the New York area and Toronto. On January 5, 2022, Irving made his season debut. On February 2, Harden played his final game as a Net in a 112–101 loss to the Sacramento Kings. Harden recorded four points, 12 assists, and six turnovers, and his play was widely criticized. Before the 2021–22 NBA trade deadline, Harden requested a trade from the Nets. Harden's contentious relationship with Durant and the Nets' lack of organizational structure were cited as reasons for his request. Harden did not play in five of his last seven games on the Nets' roster. On February 10, the Nets traded Harden and Paul Millsap to the Philadelphia 76ers in exchange for All-Star Ben Simmons, Seth Curry, Andre Drummond, and two first-round picks. Simmons would not suit-up for the Nets during the 2021–22 season due to a return to competitive reconditioning and back problems. On March 15, Irving scored a franchise-record 60 points in a 150–108 win over the Orlando Magic. On March 27, after New York City lifted the private-sector vaccine mandate, Irving played his first home game of the season. In the 2022 NBA play-in tournament, the Nets defeated the Cleveland Cavaliers 115–108 to claim the Eastern Conference's seventh seed in the 2022 NBA playoffs. They were subsequently swept by the Boston Celtics, whom they had beaten in the first round the previous year.

On June 27, 2022, Irving filed paperwork picking up his player option for the 2022–23 NBA season. Irving's opt-in was preceded by widespread speculation that he would enter free agency amid strained relations with Nets management. On June 30, 2022, Durant requested a trade from the Nets. The Nets would acquire Royce O'Neale in a trade with the Utah Jazz the same day. On August 23, 2022, Durant rescinded his trade request after meeting with Nets management.

The 2022–23 season started poorly for the Nets. On November 1, 2022, Jacque Vaughn was named interim head coach after the Nets and Nash parted ways. At the time of Nash's departure, the Nets had a 2–5 record and were 13th place in the Eastern Conference. On November 3, the Nets suspended Irving for at least five NBA games due to his failure to "unequivocally say he has no antisemitic beliefs" and said that he is "currently unfit to be associated with the Brooklyn Nets." On November 9, Vaughn was announced as permanent head coach. On November 20, Irving would return to play after serving an eight-game suspension. On December 17, Irving would make the first game-winning buzzer beater of his career in a 119–116 win over the Toronto Raptors. On December 21, the Nets would lead the shorthanded Golden State Warriors 91–51 at halftime. To date, the Nets' 91-point performance was the third-highest number of points scored by a team in a first half in NBA history. From November 27, 2022, to January 8, 2023, the Nets would have an 18–2 record, their winningest record in a 20-game stretch in franchise history. On February 3, 2023, Irving requested a trade after failure to agree on a contract extension with the Nets organization. He was subsequently traded to the Dallas Mavericks for Spencer Dinwiddie, Dorian Finney-Smith, a first-round pick, and two second-round picks. In the aftermath, Durant again requested a trade, and was sent to the Phoenix Suns for Mikal Bridges, Cameron Johnson, four first-round picks, and one pick swap. On February 8, Cam Thomas became the youngest player in NBA history to score 40 or more points in three consecutive games. On March 3, the Nets overcame a 28-point deficit to defeat the Celtics 115–105. It was the largest comeback of the 2022–23 season and the first time the Nets beat the Celtics in 10 head-to-head matchups. The Nets were swept in the first round of the playoffs by the Philadelphia 76ers.

== 2023–present: Post-superteam reset ==
The Nets pivoted to a developmental path after the mid-2023 star exits. The team fired head coach Jacque Vaughn on February 19, 2024, naming Kevin Ollie interim head coach for the final stretch, and ultimately missed the playoffs at 32–50 (11th in the East). Veteran wings Spencer Dinwiddie and Royce O’Neale were moved at the trade deadline as the club leaned harder into picks and flexibility; Ben Simmons was shut down in March due to a back issue. In April, Brooklyn hired Jordi Fernández as head coach to steer the rebuild.

The Nets doubled down on draft capital and youth during the 2024-25. The headline move being trading Mikal Bridges to the Knicks for a large haul of first-round picks (and Bojan Bogdanović among other assets), signaling a long-term reset. On the court, Brooklyn finished 26–56 (12th East) under Fernández as minutes shifted to developing scorers like Cam Thomas and a rotating young core.

For the 2025-26 Brooklyn used cap space to take swings on upside and add more picks, bringing in Michael Porter Jr. and Terance Mann via trades and signing multiple rookies from a pick-rich draft class—consistent with an “assets + development” strategy.
