= Law and Disorder (radio program) =

Radio program

- Running time: 1 hour
- Country of origin: United States
- Language(s): English
- Home station: WBAI
- Syndicates: Pacifica Network
- Starring: Michael Smith and Heidi Boghosian
- Recording studio: New York City
- Original release: 2004
- Website: lawanddisorder.org
- Podcast: feeds.feedburner.com/lawanddisorder

Law and Disorder is an hour-long United States radio program that broadcasts weekly from WBAI, part of the Pacifica Radio Network. The program focuses on legal issues. It was long hosted by Michael Ratner, President of the Center for Constitutional Rights, who died in May 2016; Heidi Boghosian, executive director of the A.J. Muste Memorial Institute; and Michael Steven Smith, a civil rights attorney and member of the National Lawyers Guild. Law and Disorder Radio is also syndicated on 24 terrestrial radio stations across the country. Law and Disorder began airing weekly shows in 2004.
