= Max Ratner =

American real estate developer and philanthropist

- Born: Meyer Ratowczer; December 26, 1907; Białystok, Congress Poland
- Died: May 31, 1995 (aged 87); Shaker Heights, Ohio, U.S.
- Occupation: Real estate developer
- Known for: Co-founder of Forest City Enterprises
- Spouse: Betty Wohlvert
- Children: Charles Ratner; Mark A. Ratner; James Ratner; Ronald Ratner
- Parent(s): Pesha Koppelman Ratowczer; Moishe Ratowczer
- Family: Bruce Ratner (nephew); Michael Ratner (nephew); Ellen Ratner (niece)

Max Ratner (December 26, 1907 - May 31, 1995) was an American real estate developer and philanthropist who co-founded Forest City Enterprises.

== Biography ==
Ratner was born Meyer Ratowczer to a Jewish family on December 26, 1907, in Białystok, Poland, the son of Pesha (née Koppelman) and Moishe Ratowczer. In 1921, he immigrated to Cleveland following the lead of his brother Charles and his family adopted the Ratner surname. He graduated from Glenville High School on the east side of Cleveland. In 1929, he graduated with a J.D. from the Cleveland-Marshall College of Law and then worked as an attorney. In the same year, he founded Forest City Materials with his brothers Charles and Leonard, his brother-in-law, Nate Shafran, and his sister, Fannye Ratner Shafran. He served as the company's president from 1929 until 1975 and then as chairman of the board from 1975 until his death in 1995.

In 1986, Forest City and his nephew, Bruce Ratner, formed a joint venture, the Forest City Ratner Companies, which is known for developing Brooklyn. Its projects there included One Pierrepont Plaza in Brooklyn Heights and Metrotech Center, a large office, commercial and academic complex in downtown Brooklyn.

Ratner was the founder and chairman of the America-Israel Chamber of Commerce. He was a supporter of Israel, the Jewish Museum in New York, and was active in the State of Israel Bonds organization. Ratner was a trustee of the Cleveland Museum of Art, a board member of the Greater Cleveland Growth Association, and served as president of the Park Synagogue in Cleveland.

== Personal life ==
In 1939, Ratner married Betty Wohlvert; they had four sons: Charles "Chuck" Ratner, Mark Ratner, James Ratner, and Ronald Ratner. He died in Shaker Heights, Ohio, on May 31, 1995, and was buried in the Park Synagogue Cemetery in Beachwood, Ohio.

His nephew is Michael Ratner and his niece is Ellen Ratner, a news analyst for Fox News.
