= Bruce Ratner =

American real estate developer & philanthropist (born 1945)

- Ratner in 1980
- Born: January 23, 1945 (age 81); Cleveland, Ohio, US
- Occupations: Real estate developer and philanthropist
- Spouse(s): Julie Ratner; Pamela Lipkin (2008–2017); Linda E. Johnson (2020–present)
- Children: 2

Bruce Ratner (born January 23, 1945, in Cleveland, Ohio) is an American real estate developer, philanthropist, and former minority owner of the NBA's Brooklyn Nets.

== Family and education ==
Ratner was born into a Jewish family in the Cleveland metropolitan area. Four of his paternal uncles, Leonard Ratner, Charles Ratner, Max Ratner, and Nate Shafran along with his aunt, Fannye Ratner Shafran founded Forest City Enterprises in 1920. originally a construction materials company it eventually evolved into construction and then into real estate development. Ratner's older brother was the late civil liberties attorney and activist Michael Ratner and his sister is Ellen Ratner, a former news analyst for Fox News. Ratner graduated from Harvard College in 1967, and earned a Juris Doctor from Columbia University in 1970.

== Early career ==
After graduating law school in 1970, Ratner was the director of the Model Cites program until 1973. Simultaneously, Ratner served as the head of the Consumer Protection Division in the administration of New York City mayor John Lindsay. From 1974 to 1978, Ratner taught at NYU's law school. Following his teaching career, Ratner returned to work for the City of New York. Under Mayor Ed Koch he became consumer affairs commissioner where he went after corrupt merchants, repairmen and alarm companies. Ratner served as Consumer of Public Affairs for 4 years beginning in 1978. He then turned to developing real estate.

== Forest City Ratner ==
In 1985, he co-founded Forest City Ratner, with the family's parent company (Forest City Enterprises which funded 70 percent of the capital. He developed the $1 billion complex of nine buildings in downtown Brooklyn called MetroTech. He supervised the building of a 393,000 square-foot shopping mall at the intersection of Atlantic and Flatbush Avenues in the 1990s.

== Metrotech Center ==
Ratner's firm, Forest City Ratner, began construction of Metrotech Center in June 1989. Brooklyn journalist Dennis Holt labeled June 26, 1989, as the start of a "new Brooklyn." The complex totals over 5.8 million square feet of office space. The creation of this office space brought at least 22,000 jobs to the borough.

== New York Times Building ==
In 2007, Ratner's company, Forest City Realty Trust completed construction and opened the New York Times Building. The skyscraper, located at 620 Eighth Avenue, is the eleventh-tallest building in the city, tied with the Chrysler Building.

== New York By Gehry ==
In 2011, Ratner's company, Forest City Realty Trust completed construction and opened New York By Gehry. Designed by Frank Gehry, the building stands 76 stories and 870 ft tall. In his review of the building, New York Times architecture critic Nicolai Ouroussoff proclaimed it "the finest skyscraper to rise in New York since Eero Saarinen's CBS Building went up 46 years ago."

== Nets ownership and the Pacific Park Brooklyn (formerly Atlantic Yards) development ==
Ratner first became owner of the Nets when he headed an ownership group that purchased the franchise from YankeeNets for $300 million. Ratner's group beat out an ownership group led by Charles Kushner and former New Jersey governor Jon Corzine. Ratner relocated the Nets to New York City, specifically to build an arena in the Prospect Heights neighborhood of Brooklyn even though there was desire to keep them in New Jersey and strong neighborhood protests to keep them out of Brooklyn.

Barclays Center is the centerpiece and the only completed piece of a $3.5 billion sports arena, business and residential complex in development called Pacific Park Brooklyn. This project is being built by Ratner's company, Forest City Ratner. The site of the arena is adjacent to the site that Walter O'Malley wanted to use for a new stadium for the Brooklyn Dodgers in the early 1950s. (O'Malley's plan was rejected by the city, resulting in the Dodgers relocating to Los Angeles in 1958.) On September 23, 2009, Russian tycoon Mikhail Prokhorov reached a deal with Ratner to purchase an 80% stake of the Nets for $200 million, subject to Ratner acquiring financing for the arena project and control of the land by the end of the year in addition to the approval of three-fourths of the NBA board of governors. According to Ratner, accepting Prokhorov as majority owner "gives us a partner who adds to the financial strength of the venture. Mikhail will have primary responsibility for the basketball part and we will have primary responsibility for the arena and the real estate." On May 11, 2010, the sale of the Nets was approved by the NBA.

Ratner originally planned to move the Nets across the Hudson River for the beginning of the 2009–10 NBA season. However, he had to revise his goal and moved the franchise to Brooklyn for the start of the 2012–13 season. Although the arena was scheduled to open in 2011, along with the rest of the complex, controversies involving the project's use of eminent domain and local residents, coupled with the lack of continued funding in a struggling economy, caused the project to be altered and delayed. On May 16, 2009, the New York Supreme Court, Appellate Division struck down an opponent's lawsuit that sought to prevent the state of New York from using eminent domain to seize the property where the 22-acre (89,000 m^{2}) Pacific Park Brooklyn project is being built. The opponents appealed the New York Supreme Court's ruling, but lost when the Court of Appeals, New York's highest court, upheld the right of the state to use eminent domain for this project. A groundbreaking ceremony was held on the site on March 11, 2010, but ringed with protests. The Nets began playing in Brooklyn in time for the 2012–13 NBA season.

== Board memberships ==
Ratner serves on a number of boards of directors, including the Weill Cornell Medical College, Memorial Sloan-Kettering Cancer Center, Cold Spring Harbor Laboratory, and the Lang Lang International Music Foundation. He is also chairman of the board of trustees for the Museum of Jewish Heritage.

Ratner also used to serve as the Brooklyn Academy of Music's chair of the board of trustees, but now he has the designation of chairman emeritus.

== Center For Early Detection of Cancer ==
In 2016, Ratner established the Center for Early Detection of Cancer in memory of his brother, Michael Ratner.

== Honorary degrees ==
Ratner holds honorary degrees from Brooklyn College, Medgar Evers College, Pratt Institute, and Long Island University.

== Personal life ==
Ratner has two daughters: Elizabeth ("Lizzy") Ratner, a senior editor at The Nation magazine, and Rebecca ("Rebbie") Ratner, a filmmaker. Following his first marriage, he was married to plastic surgeon Pamela Lipkin from 2008 to 2017. As of 2020, he is married to Linda E. Johnson, President and CEO of the Brooklyn Public Library.

Sporting positions
| Preceded by George Steinbrenner | New Jersey Nets owner 2004–2010 | Succeeded by Mikhail Prokhorov |
