= Michael Ratner =

American lawyer (1943–2016)

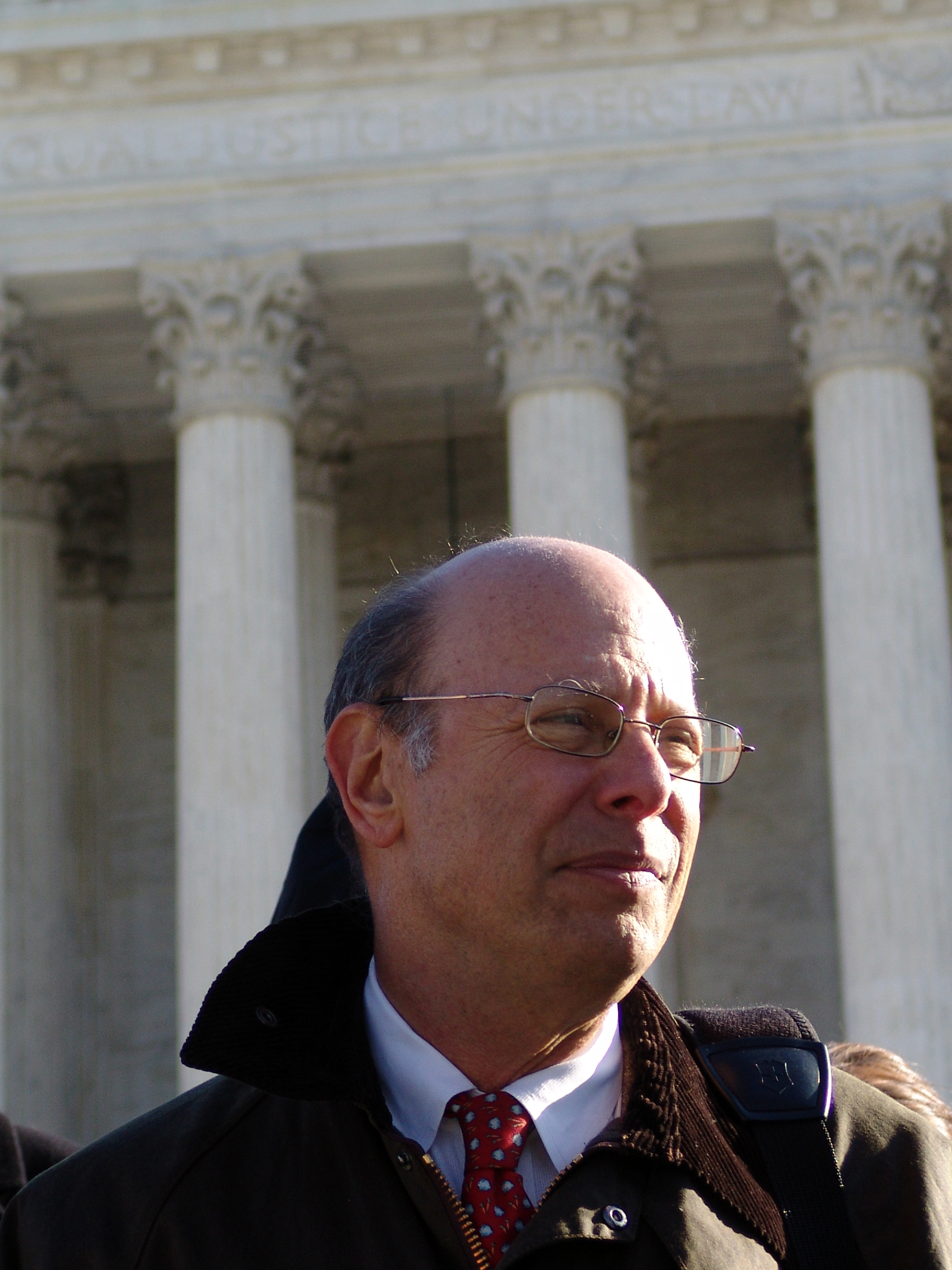
- Born: June 13, 1943; Cleveland, Ohio, U.S.
- Died: May 11, 2016 (aged 72); New York City, New York, U.S.
- Education: Brandeis University (BA); Columbia University (JD)
- Relatives: Ellen Ratner (sister); Bruce Ratner (brother); Max Ratner (uncle)

Michael Ratner (June 13, 1943 – May 11, 2016) was an American attorney. For much of his career, he was president of the Center for Constitutional Rights (CCR), a non-profit human rights litigation organization based in New York City, and president of the European Center for Constitutional and Human Rights (ECCHR) based in Berlin.

Ratner is best known for filing Rasul v. Bush, challenging President wartime detentions under George W. Bush. He was co-counsel in representing the Guantanamo Bay detainees in the United States Supreme Court, which ruled for the detainees' right to test the legality of their detentions in US courts, saying that the Guantanamo base was effectively an extension of US territory and covered by US law.

Ratner was a president of the National Lawyers Guild (NLG) and the author of numerous books and articles, including the books The Trial of Donald Rumsfeld: A Prosecution by Book, Against War with Iraq, and Guantanamo: What the World Should Know, as well as a textbook on international human rights. Ratner was the co-host of the radio program, Law and Disorder. He and three other attorneys hosted a Pacifica Radio show that reported legal developments related to civil liberties, civil rights, and human rights.

Ratner was the brother of Ellen Ratner, a radio talk show host and Fox News contributor, and Bruce Ratner, a real estate developer and former New Jersey Nets majority owner. He graduated from Brandeis University on 1966. He received his Juris Doctor degree from Columbia Law School, where he graduated first in his class.

== Career ==
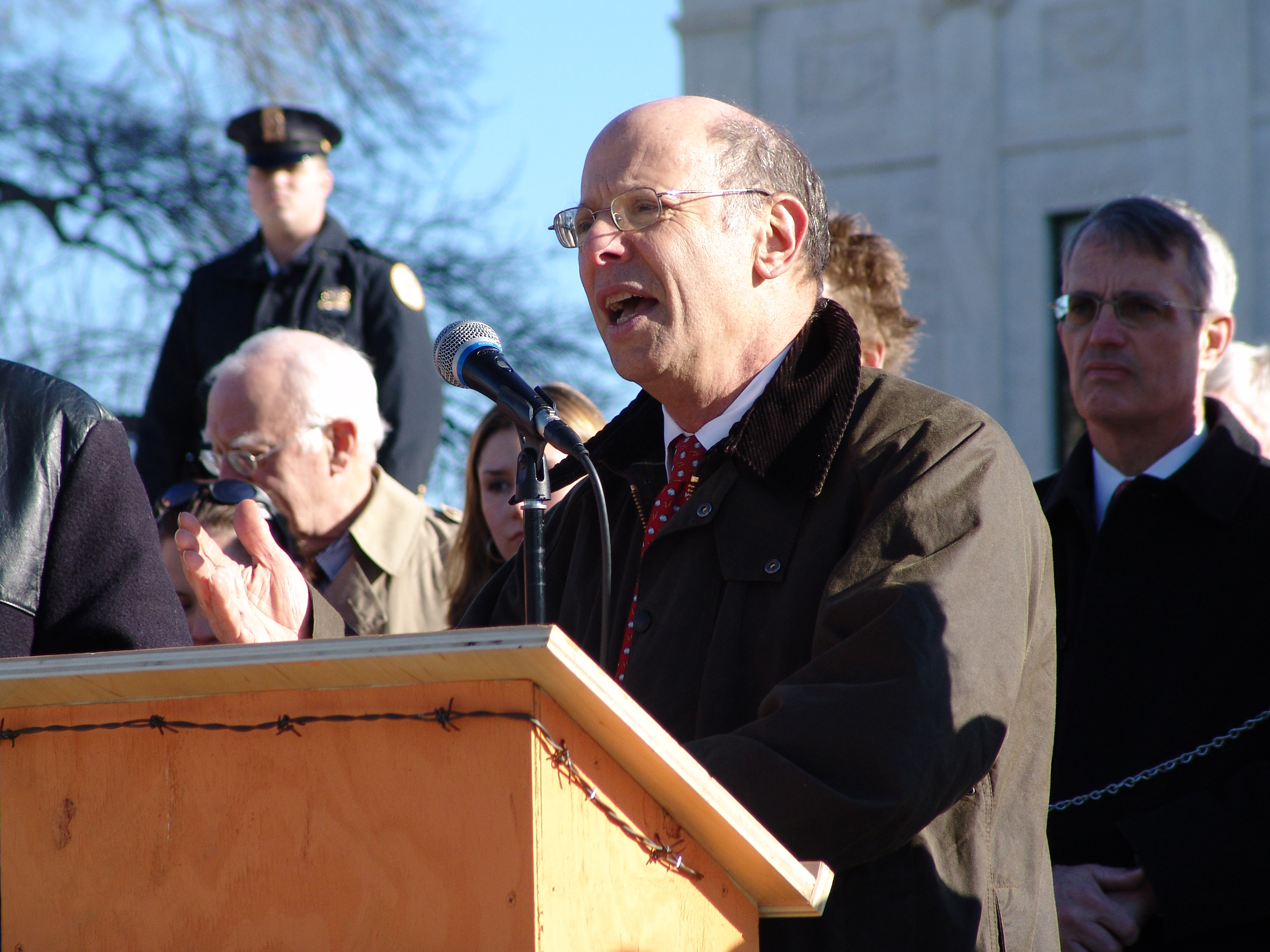
Press conference with Amnesty International and CCR in front of the US Supreme Court, 2006

Ratner taught law in the early 1970s at Columbia Law School and at Yale Law School.

=== Activism ===
Ratner opposed Abu Ghraib torture and prisoner abuse and the Iraq War. In January 2006, he served as an expert witness at a mock tribunal staged by the Bush Crimes Commission at Columbia University.

At the end of his life, Ratner was active defending Julian Assange and WikiLeaks, as well as speaking out on behalf of Jeremy Hammond and Chelsea Manning, alleged WikiLeaks sources.

In June 2013, Ratner and numerous other celebrities appeared in a video supporting Chelsea Manning, who was facing court-martial for disclosing files to WikiLeaks that included evidence of war crimes in Iraq.

In May 2014, Michael Ratner submitted his resignation from the advisory board of the International Center for Ethics, Justice and Public Life at Brandeis, due to the university's president cutting ties with Al Quds, a Palestinian University, after a student demonstration there. Ratner declared his support for Al Quds' President, Dr Nusseibeh, and his promotion of "mutual respect, peaceful coexistence and the exchange of ideas" with Israelis.

=== Civil liberties and human rights counsel ===
Shortly after the US government began to detain prisoners at the Guantanamo Bay Naval Base in Cuba in 2002 during the so-called war on terror, claiming they were beyond the reach of United States law as being "offshore" and military prisoners, Ratner was co-counsel with other attorneys and the CCR in a landmark case challenging the Bush position in court. They filed habeas corpus petitions on behalf of British men Shafiq Rasul and Asif Iqbal, and Australians David Hicks and Mamdouh Habib, saying it was unlawful to hold the men indefinitely without determining their status. They lost in the lower courts, but in November 2003, the US Supreme Court agreed to hear the case. These men were being held with no charges being brought against them. The administration had said US courts had no jurisdiction over them, but the Supreme Court disagreed, ruling in Rasul v. Bush (2004) that the detainees had habeas corpus rights as Guantanamo base was effectively an extension of US territory.

This meant the detainees could be represented by counsel, and the CCR was among the groups that worked to obtain legal representation for each of the men. This led to hundreds of men being released after court challenges.

In 2007, Ratner filed a complaint in the courts of France requesting the criminal prosecution of US Secretary of Defense Donald Rumsfeld and other US officials for the abuse and torture of prisoners at Abu Ghraib prison in Iraq.

Ratner served as a special counsel to Haitian President Jean-Bertrand Aristide, assisting in the prosecution of human rights crimes.

==== The Center for Constitutional Rights ====
The Center for Constitutional Rights, which Ratner led, states that its mission is to defend civil liberties in the US. The group's efforts have included a legal challenge to the USA PATRIOT Act and a lawsuit on behalf of post-9/11 immigration detainees in the US. The center also represented Maher Arar, a Canadian citizen who was "rendered", to Syria, where he was tortured. . Ratner and his office have also sued two private military companies working as part of the occupation of Iraq, alleging their employees were involved in the Abu Ghraib torture and prisoner abuse.

== Posthumous criticism ==
In September 2021, The New York Review of Books published an essay by Yale Law School professor and historian Samuel Moyn adapted by the author from his book Humane: How the United States Abandoned Peace and Reinvented War (2021). Tragically, writes Moyn, Ratner's career is a case history of how U.S. humanitarians ended up sanitizing the war on terror instead of opposing it. "By legalizing the manner of the conflict," Moyn asserts, "Ratner paradoxically laundered the inhumanity from what began as a brutal enterprise by helping to recodify a war that thus became endless, legal, and humane."

One week later, The New York Review of Books published a rebuttal by Kenneth Roth, executive director of Human Rights Watch, who objected that "Reducing Ratner's lifework to an effort to sanitize war and therefore unwittingly enable its continuation is not only a betrayal of his memory; it is also a misplaced attack on the decades of efforts of the human rights movement to curb the barbarity of war and protect civilians caught in its midst.". Another essay, by Ratner's colleagues Joseph Margulies and Baher Azmy, terms Moyn's essay "fantastically wrong", charging it with fundamentally misrepresenting Ratner's activities and views, as well as the broader consequences of his litigation.

== Personal life and death ==
Ratner was born into a large Jewish family of immigrants which had fled antisemitism in Poland. Both of his parents, Harry Ratner and Ann Spott, spoke Yiddish at home and were religiously observant, while Ratner was not.

Ratner was married to Karen Ranucci. He died on May 11, 2016. According to The New York Times, citing his brother, Bruce Ratner, the cause of death was complications from cancer. Ratner was ex-husband of lawyer Margaret Ratner Kunstler.

== Recognition and board appointments ==
- 2009, Courage of Conviction Award on behalf of the University of Iowa Center for Human Rights
- 2008, William J. Butler Human Rights Medal from the Urban Morgan Institute for Human Rights at the University of Cincinnati College of Law for leadership on behalf of the Center for Constitutional Rights for the defense of prisoners on Guantanamo.
- 2007, Puffin/Nation Prize for Creative Citizenship
- 2006, The National Law Journal named Ratner as one of the 100 most influential lawyers in the United States.
- 2006, Honored as the Trial Lawyer of the Year by the Trial Lawyers for Public Justice.
- 2006, Brandeis University Alumni achievement award;
- 2006, Lennon Ono Peace Grant from Yoko Ono on behalf of the Center for Constitutional Rights
- 2006, Winner of the Letelier-Moffit award from the Institute for Policy Studies on behalf of the Center for Constitutional Rights and the NYC Jobs with Justice award.
- 2006, Hans Litten Prize, named after a famous anti-fascist lawyer who was tortured to death by the Nazis. Awarded in Berlin
- 2005, The Columbia Law School Public Interest Law Foundation Award, and the Columbia Law School Medal of Honor
- 2005, given the North Star Community Frederick Douglass Award, and made an Honorary Fellow University of Pennsylvania Law School
- 2005, Marshall T. Meyer Risk-Taker Award

Ratner was the President of the European Center for Constitutional and Human Rights in Berlin. His service on the boards of non-profits included The Culture Project, The Brandeis Center for Ethics, Justice and Public Life, and The Real News (TRNN).

== Documentary ==
- Sex, Lies and Julian Assange, by Andrew Fowler and Wayne Harley. Four Corners – Australian Broadcasting Corporation, 23 July 2012.

== Works ==
=== Books ===
- 1996, International Human Rights Litigation in U.S. Courts (with Beth Stephens), Transnational Publishers, ISBN 0-941320-95-2
- 1997, Che Guevara and the FBI: U.S. Political Police Dossier on the Latin American Revolutionary, Ocean Press, ISBN 1-875284-76-1
- 2000, The Pinochet Papers: The Case of Augusto Pinochet in Spain and Britain (with Brody), Kluwer Law International, ISBN 9041114041
- 2003, Against War with Iraq: An Anti-War Primer (with Jennie Green and Barbara Olshansky), Open Media, ISBN 1-58322-591-9
- 2004, Guantanamo: What the World Should Know (with Ellen Ray), Chelsea Green Publishing Company, ISBN 1-931498-64-4
- 2008, International Human Rights Litigation in U.S. Courts with Beth Stephens, Judith Chomsky, Jennifer Green, Paul Hoffman, ISBN 978-1-57105-353-4
- 2008, The Prosecution of Donald Rumsfeld: A Prosecution by Book ISBN 1-59558-341-6
- 2011, Hell No: Your Right to Dissent in 21st-Century America (with Margaret Ratner Kunstler), The New Press, ISBN 1-595585-40-0
- 2021, Moving the Bar: My Life as a Radical Lawyer, OR Books, ISBN 978-1-68219-309-9

=== Book chapters ===
- 2004, America's Disappeared: Secret Imprisonment, Detainees, and the "War on Terror" (with Barbara Olshansky and Rachel Meeropol), ISBN 1-58322-645-1
- 2006 "Civil Remedies for Gross Human Rights Violations" Human Rights in the World Community: Issues And Action (edited by Richard Pierre Claude & Burns H. Weston) University of Pennsylvania Press, ISBN 0812281632
- 2003 "The War on Terrorism: Guantanamo Prisoners, Military Commissions and Torture" in Lost Liberties: Ashcroft and the Assault on Personal Freedom (edited by Cynthia Brown), The New Press, ISBN 1565848292
- "International Law" (with Jules Lobel) Power Trip: U.S. Unilateralism and Global Strategy After September 11 (edited by John Feffer), Seven Stories Press, 2003, ISBN 158322579X

=== Articles ===
- 1988 "Freedom at Risk; It's a Free Country: Secrecy, Censorship, and Repression in the 1980s" (edited by Richard O. Curry), Temple University Press
- 1998 "How We Closed the Guantanamo HIV Camp: The Intersection of Politics and Litigation"
- 1999 "Bypassing the Security Council: Ambiguous Authorizations to Use Force, Cease Fires, and the Iraqi Inspection Regime", (with Lobel)
- 2003 "Lost Liberties: Ashcroft and the Assault on Personal Freedom" (edited by Cynthia Brown), The New Press
- 2008 "The Lawyer's Story" in The Coroma Textile Recovery Story
- 2007 "Guantanamo: Five Years and Counting" (with Sara Miles) Salon.com
- 2007 "War Criminals "Is Waterboarding Torture? Ask the Prisoners" Salon.com November 6, 2007
- 2007 "Above the Law" (with Sara Miles), Salon.com, March 31, 2007
- 2006 "Keep the Great Writ Alive" (with Sara Miles) Salon.com, September 26, 2006
- 2005 "Wrong About Rights" (with Sara Miles) Salon.com, November 10, 2005
