= Pamela Lipkin =

American surgeon (born 1952)

- Born: 1952 (age 73–74)
- Education: Cornell University (BS); State University of New York Upstate Medical University (MD)
- Scientific career
- Fields: Plastic Surgery
- Website: www.instagram.com/pamelalipkinmd/

Pamela Lipkin (born 1952) is a New York City-based facial plastic surgeon, specializing in nose work. She has appeared on Good Morning America and ABC News, among other media, weighing in on plastic surgery matters.

She was married to New York City mega-developer Bruce Ratner until 2017.

== Background ==
She attended Cornell University and graduated from SUNY Upstate Medical University in Syracuse in 1978 for her medical degree.

She has one son from her first marriage and gave $10,000 to Republican Jeanine Pirro's gubernatorial campaign.

== Career ==
Lipkin is a noted nose specialist. An article appearing in 1991 called "The Miracle Worker" exposed her expertise in repairing bad rhinoplasties. She is adept at both primary and revision rhinoplasties. She has been an advocate of Botox-use since the 1990s, before its approval by the US Food and Drug Administration in April 2002. In 2003, she weighed in on Michael Jackson's nose job supporting the view that it was not as the star had described in the media, and that it was actually beyond repair.

She has also been forthright about taking in patients in their 30s although experts have opined such an age is too young for facial procedures due to the risk of scarring spreading.

On HealthGrades, she rates 4.7 out of 5 stars in patient satisfaction.

== Legal issues ==
In 1999, a Manhattan jury awarded a 62-year-old patient of Lipkin's $600,000 for what they believed was an overzealous series of cosmetic procedures—face and brow lift operations, a nose job, and cheek implant corrections—on a woman who was already suffering from an addiction to plastic surgery.
