= Forest City Realty Trust =

American real estate management and development company

Forest City Realty Trust, Inc.
- Formerly: Forest City Enterprises
- Traded as: NYSE: FCE.A; NYSE: FCE.B
- Industry: Real estate investment trust
- Founded: 1920; 106 years ago
- Founders: Charles, Leonard, Max, and Fannye Ratner
- Defunct: December 7, 2018; 7 years ago
- Fate: Acquired by Brookfield Asset Management
- Headquarters: Cleveland, Ohio, United States
- Key people: James A. Ratner (Chairman); David J. LaRue (CEO); Robert G. O’Brien (CFO)
- Products: Office buildings; Shopping centers; Apartments
- Website: www.forestcity.net

Forest City Realty Trust, Inc., formerly Forest City Enterprises, was an American real estate investment trust that invested in office buildings, shopping centers and apartments in the United States. The company was organized in Maryland with its headquarters in Cleveland, Ohio. As of December 31, 2017, the company owned 29 office buildings, 29 shopping centers, and 78 apartment complexes. In December 2018, the company was acquired by Brookfield Asset Management.

== History ==
In 1920, Forest City was founded as a family-owned lumber and household hardware business by siblings Charles, Leonard, Max and Fannye Ratner, immigrants from Poland. Beginning in the 1930s, the company invested in residential garages, apartments, retail strip centers. During World War II, the company manufactured and prefabricated governmental housing.

In 1960, Forest City became a publicly traded company and rebranded itself as Forest City Enterprises.

In 1987, the company sold its retail lumber business to Handy Andy Home Improvement Center.

In 2011, the company sold a 49% stake in a retail portfolio in New York for $172.3 million. In 2013, the company acquired a 100% interest in The Mall at Robinson near Pittsburgh.

In January 2016, for tax purposes, the company converted into a real estate investment trust and was renamed Forest City Realty Trust. In February 2016, the company sold its stake in the Brooklyn Nets and the Barclays Center to Mikhail Prokhorov. It also sold its military housing division to Hunt Companies for $208.8 million,

In June 2017, Forest City shareholders voted to eliminate the dual share structure that had enabled the founding Ratner family to control the company.

That month, the City of New York filed a lawsuit against the company in conjunction with the rent due pursuant to a ground lease.

In October 2017, the company sold its interests in 10 malls to Queensland Investment Corporation for $1.55 billion.

In December 2018, the company was acquired by Brookfield Asset Management.

== Notable investments ==
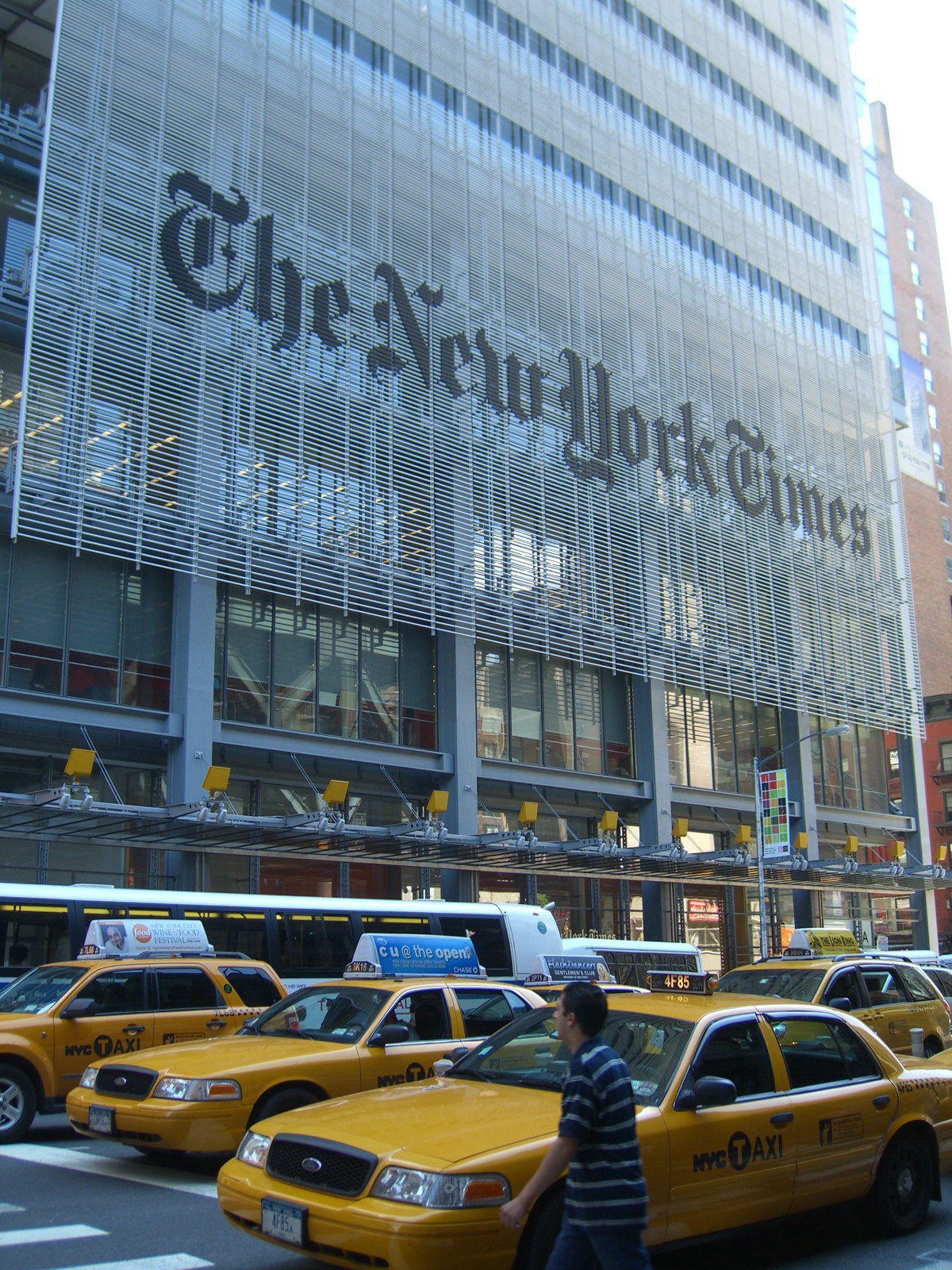
Forest City developed The New York Times Building in New York City in 2008.

Notable projects that were owned by the company are:

- 8 Spruce Street, also known as "New York by Gehry", for its designer, Frank Gehry.
- Pacific Park, Brooklyn, a mixed-use development in Brooklyn that includes the Barclays Center.
- Central Station, a primarily residential development on the site of a former railroad terminal in Chicago.
- Mercantile National Bank Building, a mixed-use urban redevelopment project of a historical office complex in Dallas.
- Mesa del Sol, planned for 100,000 inhabitants in Albuquerque, is the company's largest mixed-use development, co-owned by Covington Capital Partners.
- New York Times Building, a 52-story building in Midtown Manhattan designed by architect Renzo Piano.
- Northfield Stapleton is an open-air, 1,200,000-square-foot (110,000 m^{2}) retail town center at the company's mixed-use redevelopment project at Stapleton International Airport in Denver.
- Public Health Service Hospital District in San Francisco's Presidio.
- Radian, a 26-story, curved residential tower in the Financial District of Boston.
- Showcase Mall, a shopping center on the Las Vegas Strip.
- Short Pump Town Center, an outdoor mall in Richmond, Virginia.
- Station Square, a 52-acre (210,000 m^{2}) indoor and outdoor shopping, dining and entertainment complex in Pittsburgh.
- University Park at MIT, a mixed-use urban redevelopment project on an abandoned industrial site near the Massachusetts Institute of Technology in Cambridge, Massachusetts.
- Victoria Gardens, a mixed-use shopping center development in Rancho Cucamonga, California.
- Westchester's Ridge Hill, an upscale, urban open-air shopping center in Yonkers, New York anchored by Lord & Taylor until the store closed in 2020.
