= Ellen Ratner =

American news analyst

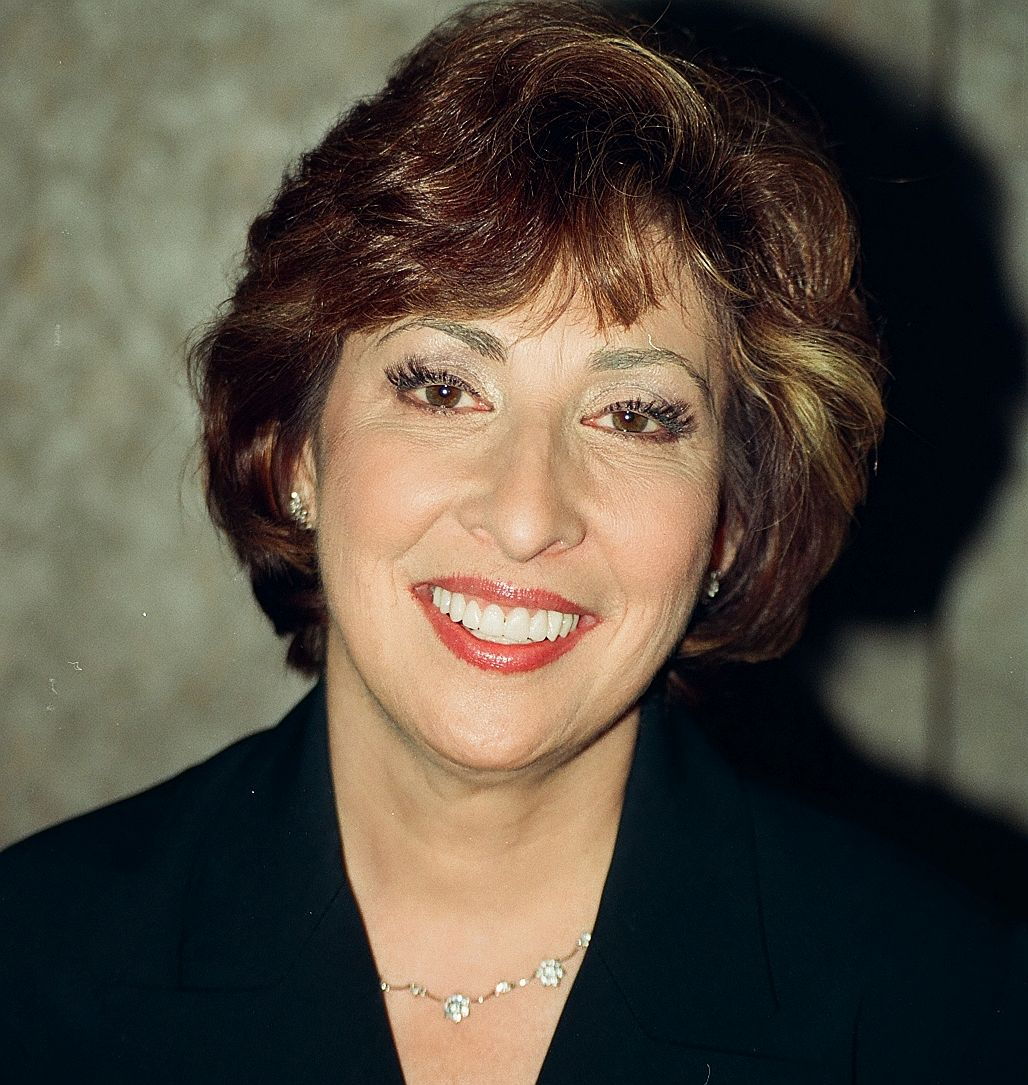
- Ratner in 1996
- Born: Cleveland, Ohio, US
- Occupation: Journalist
- Spouse: Cholene Espinoza
- Family: Bruce Ratner (brother); Michael Ratner (brother); Max Ratner (uncle)

Ellen Ratner (born in Cleveland, Ohio) is an American news analyst who formerly appeared on the Fox News Channel and appeared on The Strategy Room and The Long and Short of It. She is a retired White House correspondent and former bureau chief for Talk Media News, which she also managed, covering the White House and was heard on more than 400 radio stations across the US. Her brothers are New York City-based developer Bruce Ratner and the late human rights attorney Michael Ratner.

She is the author of Ready, Set, Talk! A Guide to Getting Your Message Heard by Millions on Talk Radio, Talk Television, and Talk Internet (2006), 101 Ways to Get Your Progressive Ideas on Talk Radio (1997), and The Other Side of the Family: A Book for Recovery from Abuse, Incest and Neglect (1990). In 2011 she co-authored, Self Empowerment: Nine Things the 19th Century Can Teach Us About Living in the 21st with Anne Gehman.

She is also co-founder of self-help publishing company Changing Lives Press. Among other books it has come out with is a satire of her brother's Atlantic Yards saga. It also came out with her 2011 book.

Ratner attended Goddard College and, for a Masters in Education, Harvard University. She is married to Cleveland resident Cholene Espinoza. She has two brothers: New York attorney Michael Ratner and real estate developer Bruce Ratner.
