= The Shops at Northfield =

Coordinates: 39°46′57″N 104°53′31″W

- Location: Denver, Colorado, United States
- Opened: 2005
- Owner: QIC
- Num. of stores: ~50
- Num. of anchor tenants: 4 (2 open, 1 closing, 1 vacant)
- Floor area: 1,200,000 square feet (110,000 m^{2})
- Floors: 1 (2 in Bass Pro Shops and former Macy's)

The Shops at Northfield is an open-air, 1,200,000-square-foot (110,000 m^{2}) retail town center located at the Stapleton International Airport redevelopment in Denver, Colorado, United States. It is owned and operated by QIC.

The Shops at Northfield is anchored by Target, Bass Pro Shops Outdoor World, and an 18-screen Harkins Theatres. The center also includes approximately 50 specialty shops, restaurants and retailers.

On January 9, 2025, it was announced that the Macy's anchor store would be closing as part of a plan to close 66 stores nationwide. The store closed on March 23, 2025.

On February 11, 2025, it was announced that the JCPenney is on a national closure list. The store closed in May 2025.

== Anchors ==
- Super Target (Opened 2005)
- Bass Pro Shops Outdoor World (Opened 2005)

== Junior anchors ==
- Northfield 18 (Opened 2006)
- H&M (Opened 2018)

== Former anchors ==
- Borders (Opened 2005, Closed 2011) (Replaced by Macy's Home)
- Circuit City (Opened 2005, Closed 2009) (Replaced by GameWorks)
- Macy's (Opened 2006, Closed 2025)
- JCPenney (Opened 2005, Closed 2025)

== Sustainability ==
Northfield Stapleton was named a Bronze Achiever in the Environmental Leadership Program by Colorado's Department of Public Health and Environment. It was registered as a Leadership in Energy and Environmental Design (LEED) Core and Shell Pilot Project with the United States Green Building Council (USGBC) and recently named the first main street retail center in the U.S. to receive LEED-CS Silver certification.
