= Stuckey (surname) =

- Allie Beth Stuckey (born 1992), American political commentator
- Andy Stuckey, of Stuckey and Murray, US comedy music duo, performing 2001–8
- Bruce Stuckey (born 1947), English footballer
- Chansi Stuckey (born 1983), a US American football player for the Arizona Cardinals
- Darrell Stuckey (born 1987), US American football player
- Elizabeth Stuckey-French (born 1958), US author
- Elma Stuckey (1907–1988), US African American poet
- George Stuckey (1871–1932), Australian rules footballer
- Henry Stuckey (born 1950), US American football player
- Henry Stuckey (architect) (1821 – 31 May 1851), early colonial architect in South Australia
- Hugh Stuckey (1928–2018), Australian entertainment writer
- James Stuckey, US real estate developer, active 2007 to 2011
- Jann Stuckey (born 1955), Australian politician
- Jim Stuckey (born 1958), US American football player
- Lyn Stuckey (born 1978), US performer, works with Australian children's performing group The Wiggles
- Maurice Stuckey (born 1990), German basketball player
- Melissa Stuckey, American politician
- Nat Stuckey (1933–1988), US country singer.
- Peter Stuckey (born 1940), English cricketer
- Rodney Stuckey (born 1986), US basketball player
- Scott Stuckey (born 1964), US filmmaker
- Shawn Stuckey (born 1975), US American football player
- Sophie Stuckey (born 1991), English actress
- Sterling Stuckey (1932–2018), US historian
- Will Stuckey (1873–1928), Australian rules footballer
- W.S. Stuckey, Jr. (born 1935), US businessperson & politician
- W. S. Stuckey, Sr. (1909–1977), US businessperson

== See also ==
- Steven Stucky (1949–2016), US composer
- Stucki
- Stuckley
- Stukeley
