= Wolfermann =

Wolfermann, Wolferman, or Wolffermann are German-language surnames. Notable people with the surname include:

- Ana Wolfermann
- Ilan Wolfferman, birth name of Ilan Ramon
- Klaus Wolfermann (1946–2024), West German javelin thrower
- Stuart Wolferman, member of Imaginary Johnny, American indie-rock band
