= Dolly Williams =

Trinidadian-American contracting executive

Dolly Williams is the co-founder and CFO of A. Williams Construction, a Brooklyn, NY, general contracting company. She has been a member of the New York City Planning Commission from July 2002.

== Personal life ==
Williams, born in Trinidad and Tobago, has lived in Brooklyn, NY, since 1971. She and her husband, Adonijah "Carl" Williams, have two children and reside in Park Slope, Brooklyn, NY.

A graduate of St. Francis College with a BS in Accounting, in 1979 Williams and her husband founded A. Williams Trucking & Backhoe Trenching Company (also known as A. Williams Construction), which has grown into a multimillion-dollar business with 25 employees. A. Williams Construction received the U.S. Small Business Administration's Contractor of the Year Award in 1995, Crain's Small Business Award in 1999 for Contractor of the Year, and Contractor Firm of the Year in 2001 by the U.S. Department of Commerce.

Williams received the U.S. Small Business Administration Minority Small Business Person of the Year Award for the New York District in 1998 and was honored as the 1999 Woman of the Year by the Brooklyn Boys & Girls Club. In 2003, she was presented with a Woman of Great Esteem Award, presented by Qkingdom Ministries.

== Politics ==
Williams has served on the boards of the Red Hook/Gowanus Chamber of Commerce, the South Brooklyn Empire Zone and the NYS Association of Minority Contractors. She was chairperson of the Caribbean American Center for New York, and has served as a member of Brooklyn Community Board Six.

=== New York City Planning Commission ===
In 2002, Williams was appointed to the New York City Planning Commission by Brooklyn Borough President Marty Markowitz. As a member of the Commission (and the only appointee from Brooklyn), she was involved with reviewing and voting on development and land use in New York City, including the controversial Atlantic Yards proposal for downtown Brooklyn, a project which would include a new arena for the New Jersey Nets.

In 2004, it was revealed that Williams had invested a million dollars in real estate developer Bruce Ratner's purchase of the New Jersey Nets. Williams subsequently announced that she would recuse herself from any further decisions about the Atlantic Yards project.

In 2007, Williams was fined $4,000 by the New York City Conflicts of Interest Board for voting in support of Atlantic Yards while at the same time investing in the project. Borough President Marty Markowitz declined to reappoint Williams to the Planning Commission and named Shirley McRae as her successor.
