= Brooklyn Times-Union =

Newspaper in New York City (1848–1937)

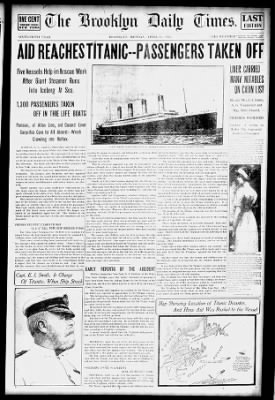
Front page of the April 15, 1912, edition of the then-Brooklyn Daily Times

The Brooklyn Times-Union was an American newspaper published from 1848 to 1937. Launched in 1848 as the Williamsburgh Daily Times by George C. Bennett, the publication became the Brooklyn Daily Times when the cities of Brooklyn and Williamsburg were unified in 1855. The newspaper supported the then-progressive Republican Party, and the Abolition movement. Walt Whitman was one of their reporters and managing editors in the late 1850s. A significant selection of his writings for the paper were identified and republished on the Walt Whitman Archive in 2024.

The paper was published both daily and on Sunday, and had a peak circulation that included all of Kings County, and large segments of Nassau and Suffolk Counties. As the Brooklyn Daily Times, the paper was published in various editions, including the Long Island, Wall Street, and Noon editions.

The Daily Times was renamed the Brooklyn Times-Union after it bought out the Brooklyn Standard Union in 1932, and was itself bought out by the Brooklyn Eagle, which Whitman had edited in the 1840s, in 1937.

Brooklyn's Times Plaza at the intersections of Flatbush Avenue; Atlantic Avenue, Fourth Avenue, Ashland Place, State Street, and Hanson Place was named for this newspaper.
