= James Stuckey =

American businessman

- Born: James Phillip Stuckey
- Occupation: Real estate developer

James Phillip Stuckey is a New York City real estate developer. He is responsible for the creation of many New York public and private large-scale projects, and was responsible for the Atlantic Yards project in Brooklyn, as president, chief executive officer, and founder of Forest City Ratner Companies' Atlantic Yards Development Group.

From September 2007 to October 2011, he was the Divisional Dean, Clinical Professor, and Klara and Larry Silverstein Chair of the NYU Schack Institute of Real Estate, where he oversaw creation of a their Master of Science program in Real Estate Development and their Center for the Sustainable Built Environment. He resigned in October 2011.

In public service, he is President of the New York City Public Design Commission, and past chair of the Center Against Domestic Violence.
