= Times Plaza =

Intersection in Brooklyn, New York

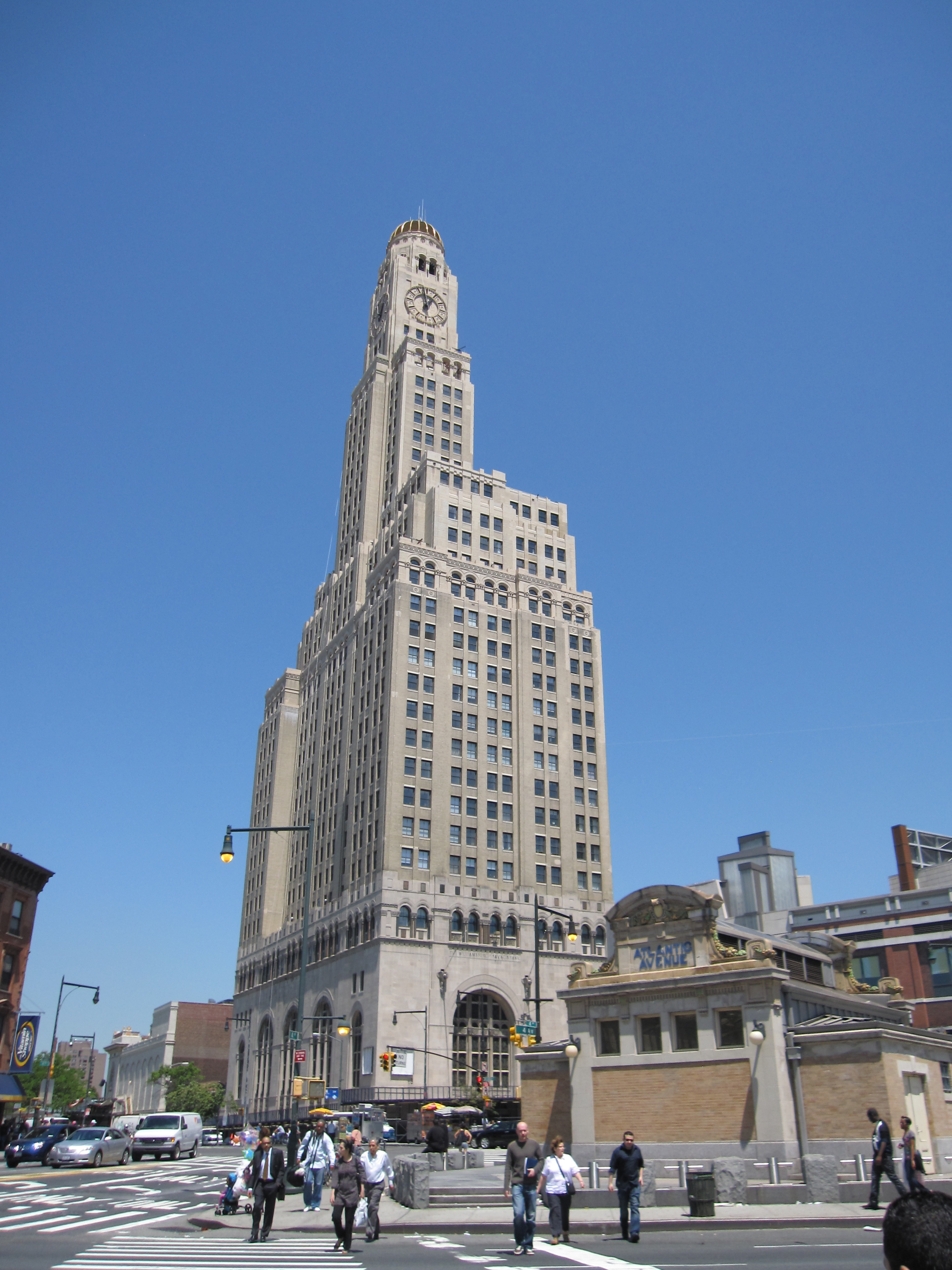
The Williamsburgh Savings Bank Tower, now 1 Hanson Place apartments. In the right foreground is the disused headhouse of Atlantic Avenue – Barclays Center subway station

Map

Times Plaza is the historical name for the intersection of Flatbush Avenue, Fourth Avenue, and Atlantic Avenue in the New York City borough of Brooklyn. The area came to be called Times Plaza for the nearby offices of the Brooklyn Daily Times. The United States Postal Service office located at 539 Atlantic Avenue is still called the Times Plaza Station.

Times Plaza is in Downtown Brooklyn and sits on the borders of the Park Slope, Fort Greene, and Boerum Hill neighborhoods. It is a short distance down Flatbush Avenue from the Grand Army Plaza.

== Points of interest ==
- The Times Plaza Control House, or headhouse was the original entrance to the Atlantic Avenue–Barclays Center station of the New York City Subway (now served by the 2, 3, 4, 5, B, D, N, Q, R and W trains) when it was built in 1908 by Heins & LaFarge. Its location on the triangular island at the center of the intersection proved inconvenient as traffic increased on the three major streets that surround it, so other entrances were created. It now serves as a skylight for the station.
- The Williamsburgh Savings Bank Tower at 1 Hanson Place is a New York City designated landmark on the north side of Times Plaza.
- The Atlantic Terminal of the Long Island Rail Road
- The Atlantic Terminal Mall
- The site of the Pacific Park (formerly Atlantic Yards) development project
