= Stucki =

Stucki is a Swiss surname. Notable people with the surname include:

- Daniel Stucki (born 1981), Swiss football player
- Lorna Stucki, British singer
- Marie Laeng-Stucki, (1905–1974) Swiss entrepreneur, co-founder of Lenco Turntables

It may also be an alternative spelling of Stuckey (surname)
