= Marty Markowitz =

American politician (born 1945)

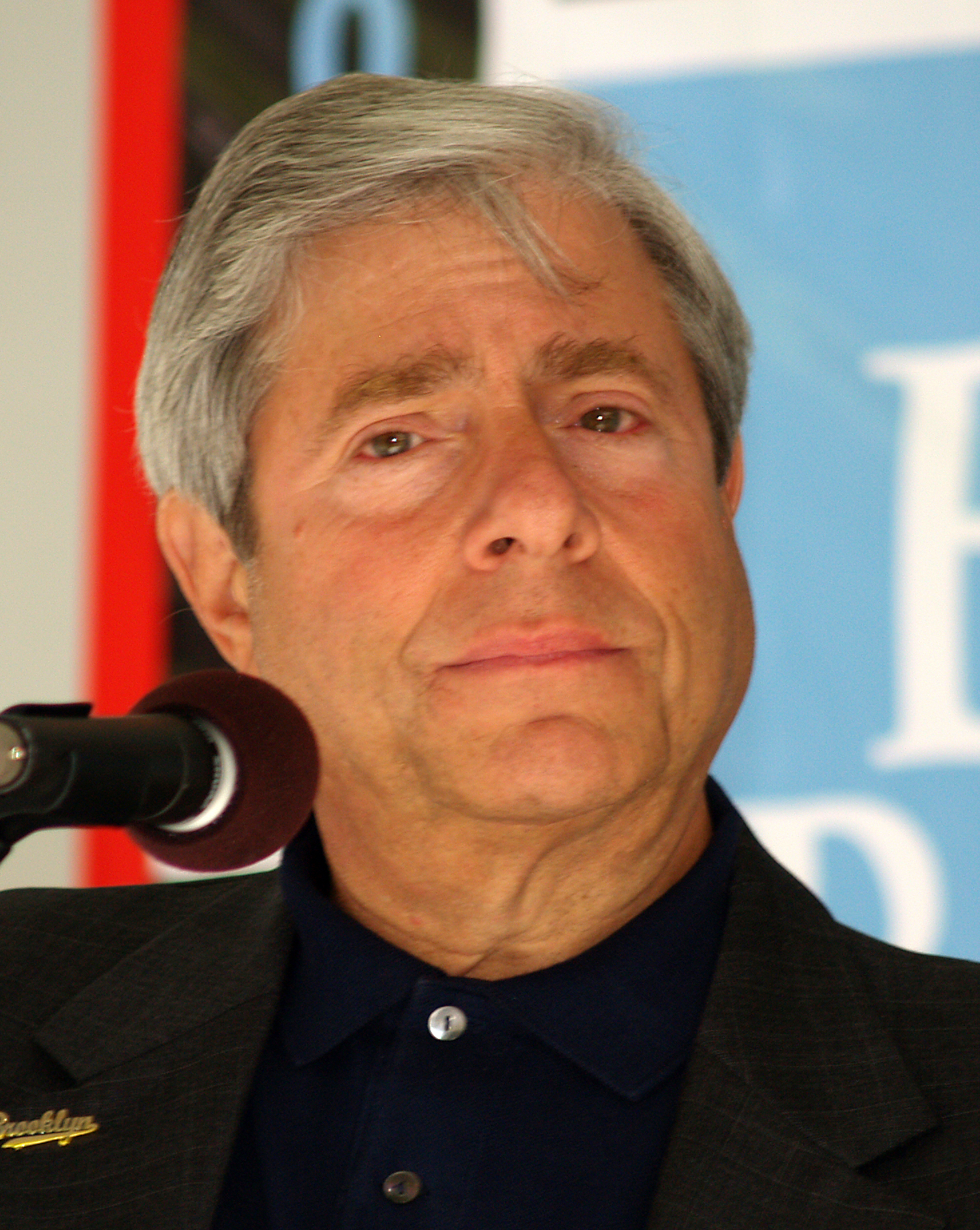
- Markowitz in 2007

17th Borough President of Brooklyn
- In office January 1, 2002 – December 31, 2013
- Preceded by: Howard Golden
- Succeeded by: Eric Adams

Member of the New York State Senate
- In office January 1, 1979 – December 31, 2001
- Preceded by: Jeremiah B. Bloom
- Succeeded by: Carl Andrews
- Constituency: 19th district (1979–1982); 21st district (1983–1992); 20th district (1993–2001)

Personal details
- Born: February 14, 1945 (age 81) Brooklyn, New York, U.S.
- Party: Democratic
- Spouse: Jamie Snow
- Education: Brooklyn College (BA)

Martin Markowitz (born February 14, 1945) is an American politician who served as the borough president of Brooklyn, New York City. He was first elected in 2001 after serving 23 years as a New York State Senator. His third and final term ended in December 2013.

== Early life and education ==
Martin Markowitz was born on February 14, 1945 in Crown Heights, Brooklyn to a Jewish family. His father, Robert, was a waiter at George & Sid's, a kosher delicatessen, but died when Marty was nine years old; his mother, Dorothy, moved the family to public housing in Sheepshead Bay. Markowitz graduated from Wingate High School in Brooklyn's Prospect Lefferts Gardens section in 1962.

He took night classes at Brooklyn College for nine years, and received his bachelor's degree in political science in 1970.

== Political career ==
Markowitz began his public service career in 1971, at the age of 26, by forming the Flatbush Tenants Council in the Brooklyn neighborhood of Flatbush. The organization grew into Brooklyn Housing & Family Services, which is the largest tenants advocacy organization operating in New York State today.

=== State senate ===
He was a member of the New York State Senate from 1979 to 2001, sitting in the 183rd, 184th, 185th, 186th, 187th, 188th, 189th, 190th, 191st, 192nd, 193rd and 194th New York State Legislatures. He was known for creating a series of oceanfront concerts and other festivals rather than drafting legislation. At one such concert, in 1990, soul legend Curtis Mayfield was left paralyzed from the neck down after a lighting fixture that had been knocked loose by wind fell on him, crushing several of his vertebrae. Markowitz had insisted on continuing the show, despite the hurricane-force winds buffeting the stage.

=== Campaigns for borough presidency ===
Markowitz first ran for borough president in 1985, but failed to unseat the incumbent Howard Golden. Markowitz subsequently pleaded guilty to a misdemeanor for failing to disclose a campaign contribution; he was fined and performed community service.

He was elected to the borough presidency in 2001 as the Democratic candidate, and was re-elected on November 8, 2005, with 79% of the vote, compared to 13% for Republican challenger Theodore Alatsas, and 7% for Green Party candidate Gloria Mattera.

=== Borough presidency ===
As borough presidents have little real power within city government, Markowitz used the office to be an aggressive advocate for Brooklyn, promoting mainstream tourism and events. In the 2005 New York City mayoral election, he also endorsed Republican incumbent Michael Bloomberg, as did many other Democrats including Ed Koch.

During the Blackout of 2003, he stood on the Brooklyn Bridge as throngs of fellow Brooklynites trudged home from work in Manhattan, holding a megaphone and cheering "Welcome home to Brooklyn!" to thunderous applause. He repeated this during the 2005 New York City transit strike, inviting Brooklynites into Borough Hall for warm drinks and a chance to call loved ones. He frequently spoke at public schools in Brooklyn on occasions such as performances and graduations.

Markowitz continued promoting affordable housing, as he had in the Senate. Through capital funding and use of the borough president's Uniform Land Use Review Procedure (ULURP) authority, thousands of affordable housing units have been created, including inclusionary zoning in Greenpoint/Willamsburg and the Habitat for Humanity project in Ocean Hill/Brownsville. He agitated to save Starrett City, the nation's largest federally-subsidized housing complex, and keep it "affordable forever". His efforts to expand Brooklyn's economy include gentrifying Coney Island; rezoning Greenpoint, Williamsburg, and downtown Brooklyn; cleaning up Newtown Creek; encouraging development of the Brooklyn Cruise Terminal; and attracting regional corporate headquarters, large manufacturers and retailers, startups and green businesses.

As a longtime advocate for seniors, Markowitz campaigned to keep Brooklyn senior centers open when they were threatened with closures due to budget cuts. His efforts to save Brooklyn's financially troubled medical institutions resulted in the preservation of maternity and pediatric units at Long Island College Hospital as well as the critical services provided by school medical clinics. He also called for increased parental and community engagement in schools and has supported policies that improve graduation rates and prepare Brooklyn students to compete and succeed in the global economy. His office was instrumental in creating two new schools in Brooklyn: the High School for Innovation in Advertising and Media and the Brooklyn Academy of Global Finance on Stuyvesant Avenue.

He founded and hosts the Seaside Summer Concert Series (begun in 1979), New York City's largest free weekly concert series, and the Martin Luther King, Jr. Concert Series (started in 1983), the nation's largest free public concerts for African American and Caribbean audiences. He has supported Brooklyn's cultural community, including the BAM Cultural District and Issue Project Room, and worked to restore the Loew's Kings Theatre in Flatbush. He hosted annual heritage events at Borough Hall celebrating Brooklyn's diversity, including celebrations of the Turkish, Asian, Latino, African-American, Jewish, Caribbean, Italian, Greek, Russian, Polish, Lebanese and LGBT communities. Markowitz has worked to establish Brooklyn's first-ever LGBT Center for Brooklyn. The Brooklyn Community Pride Center board has been formed to determine a location and gather support for the project.

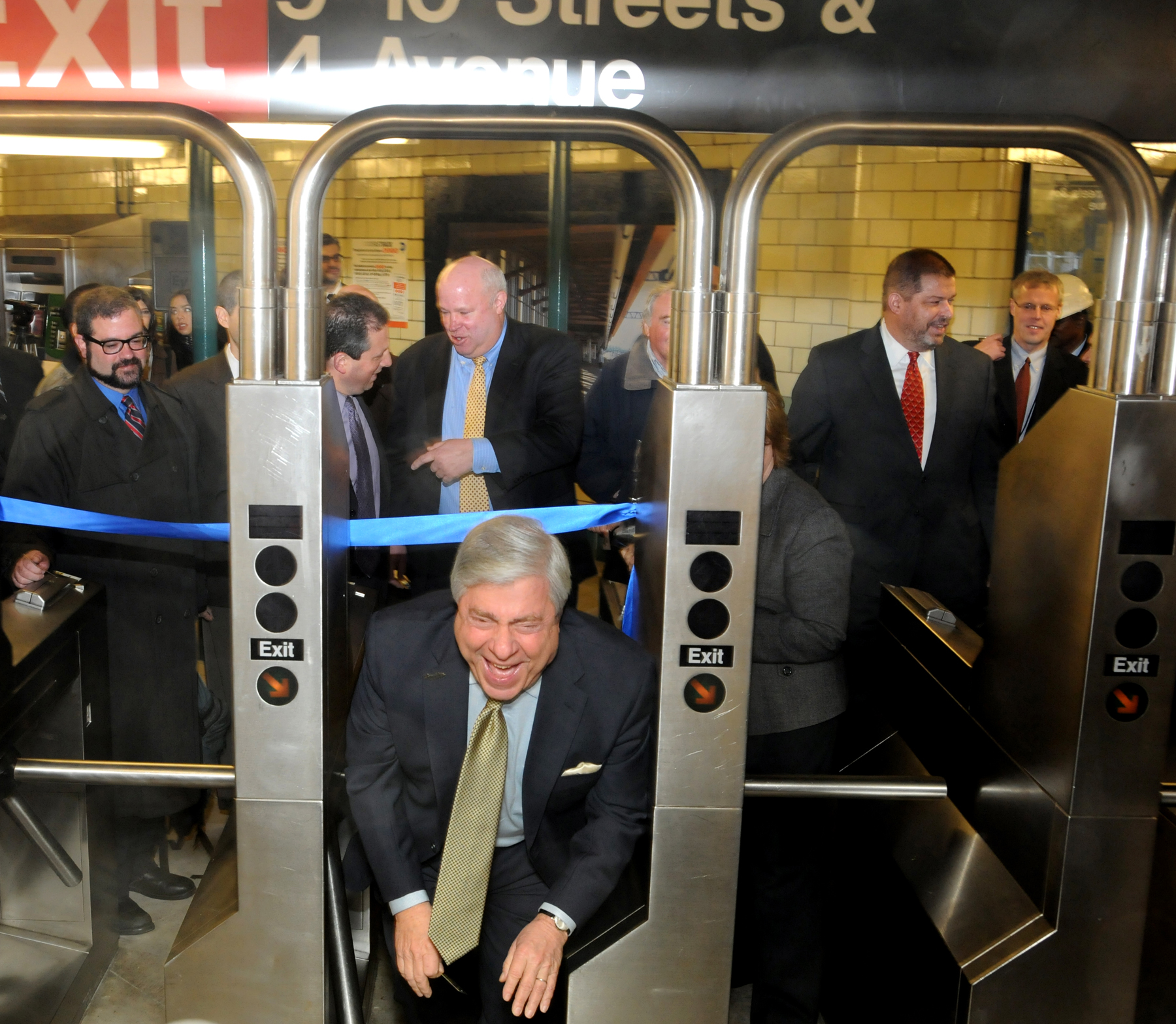
Markowitz at the opening of a New York City Subway entrance

As borough president, he founded initiatives to promote and improve the quality of life in Brooklyn, including Shop Brooklyn; the Lighten Up Brooklyn and Take Your Man to the Doctor campaigns; Camp Brooklyn; the jobs-for-youth Summer HEAT program; Dine in Brooklyn restaurant week; the Brooklyn Book Festival; the smART Brooklyn Gallery Hop; and a tourism organization called Brooklyn Tourism. Former Brooklyn female district leader Renee Collymore worked for him as an executive assistant.

==== Barclays Center ====
Markowitz has been a supporter of the controversial Atlantic Yards complex (renamed Pacific Park since 2014). The arena, now known as the Barclays Center, houses the NBA's Brooklyn Nets and served as a temporary home for the NHL's New York Islanders before they moved to UBS Arena in 2021. His desire to bring an NBA team to Brooklyn had been known since his campaign for borough president, and he was instrumental in persuading Bruce Ratner to purchase the Nets in 2004. Initially uninterested, Ratner said that Markowitz "called every two to three weeks.... I am sure I said to my assistant, 'Oh, my God, it's Marty.'"

In 2002 Markowitz appointed Dolly Williams to the New York City Planning Commission. Two years later, it was revealed that Williams, who is co-founder of a Brooklyn construction company, had invested a million dollars in Bruce Ratner's purchase of the New Jersey Nets. Williams announced that she would recuse herself from any decisions about the Atlantic Yards project, and she is the only Brooklyn appointee to the Planning Commission.

In March 2008, Ratner acknowledged that much of the project was stalled – but that construction on the basketball arena would begin before 2009. This angered many citizens, who have suggested that affordable housing should come before a sports complex for the developer's team, and angers still more of them as none of the affordable housing has yet been built as of 2014.

On April 3, 2008, Markowitz and his wife Jamie Snow attended a controversial gala honoring Ratner at the Brooklyn Museum. The event featured Japanese artist Takashi Murakami and a performance by Kanye West. Markowitz delivered an address to attendees, prompting protesters outside to take a break from shouting "shame" in order to chant pejoratives at the borough president. During this same event, Markowitz's wife Jamie took eight limited edition fiberglass placemats designed by Murakami; this move caused some controversy, since there were only enough produced to provide each guest with one. Markowitz defended his wife, saying the couple would sell them and profits would go to Camp Brooklyn, a program that sends low-income kids to camp. "If they're truly worth a thousand dollars, we will sell them and give every penny," he said. Similar limited edition Murakami placemats have sold for around $1,000 on eBay.

The Barclays Center opened on September 28, 2012, with a concert by Brooklyn-born rapper Jay-Z.

==== Opposition to Prospect Park West bike lane ====
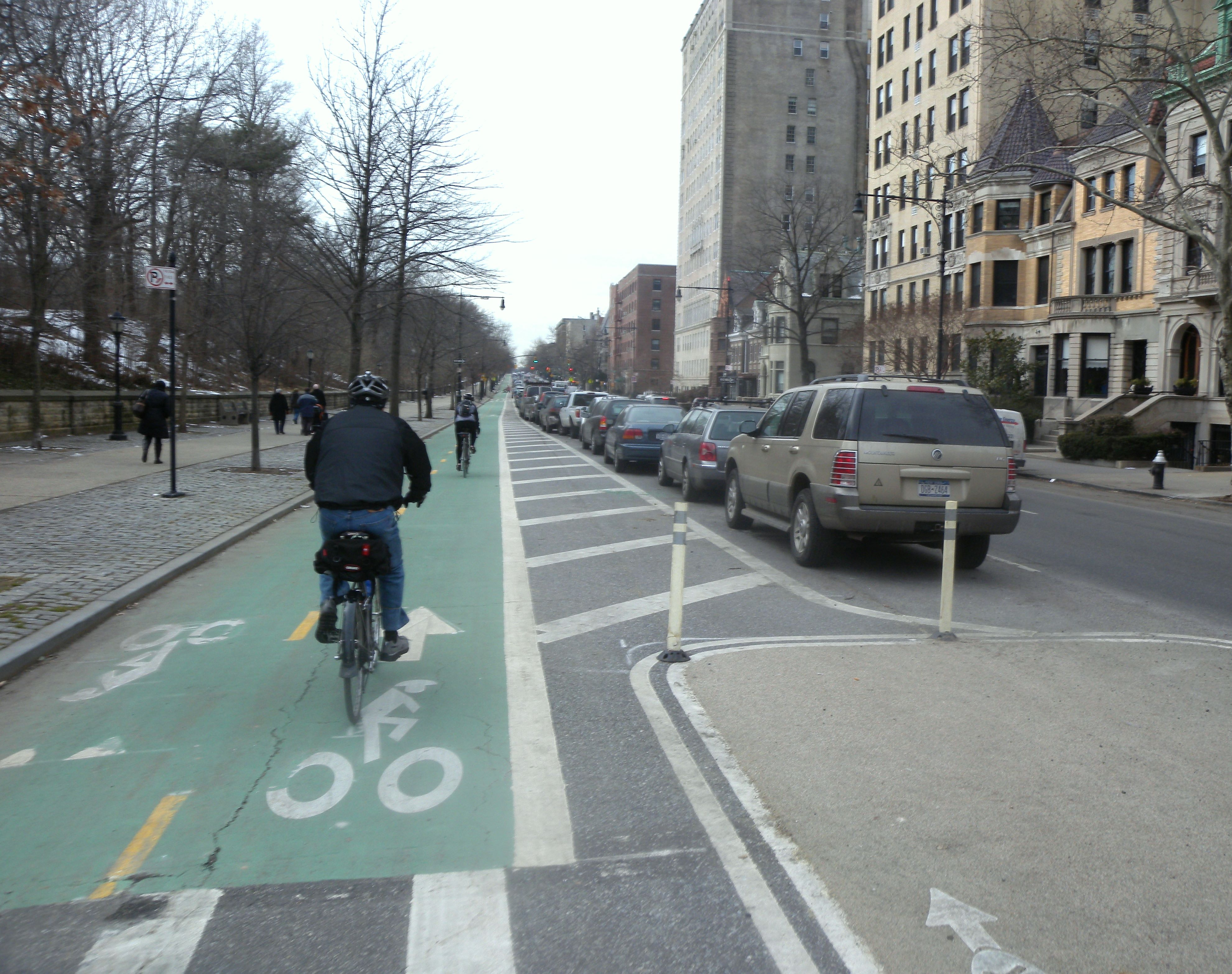
Prospect Park West bike lane looking southwest from Carroll Street

In September 2009, NYC Department of Transportation was scheduled to modify the layout of Prospect Park West, installing a two-way protected bicycle lane. The project was stalled after Markowitz wrote a letter to the city opposing the measure. The traffic calming measures were planned in response to documented pedestrian safety issues and had the support of Community Board 6. A DOT study showed that "more than 70% of vehicles were exceeding the 30 mph limit, and at least 15 percent were traveling at 40 mph or faster. From 2005 to 2007, there were 58 reported crashes on Prospect Park West." The conflict came to a head in April 2010 when DOT announced plans to go ahead with the modifications. Markowitz made disparaging remarks about DOT commissioner Janette Sadik-Khan, calling her a "zealot", though he later clarified his statement. Markowitz claimed he supports other bike lanes in the city, but his opposition stems from the elimination of parking spaces and one lane of traffic. The bike lane was completed in June 2010 despite Markowitz's continued opposition. Markowitz lives in Windsor Terrace, on the southern portion of Prospect Park West.

=== Possible mayoral bid ===
Markowitz considered running for mayor of New York in the 2009 and 2013 elections, but ultimately decided not to run. He supported independent Michael Bloomberg's reelection in 2009, over Democratic nominee Bill Thompson.

=== Conflicts of Interest Board violations and fine ===
In July 2011, New York City's Conflicts of Interest Board fined Markowitz $20,000, an unusually large penalty, for accepting three trips for his wife, Jamie Snow, that were paid for by the governments of Turkey and the Netherlands. The Board found that "by accepting travel expenses for his wife for each trip, [Markowitz] used his position as a public servant for private or personal advantage." The Board found that he had been aware of the rule prohibiting his acceptance of the free trips at the time of the trips.

== Personal life ==
Markowitz and his wife Jamie Snow were married in 1999. They live in Windsor Terrace, on the southern portion of Prospect Park West.

New York State Senate
| Preceded by Jeremiah B. Bloom | Member of the New York State Senate from the 19th district 1979–1982 | Succeeded by Martin M. Solomon |
| Preceded by Christopher J. Mega | Member of the New York State Senate from the 21st district 1983–1992 | Succeeded by Donald Halperin |
| Preceded by Ada Smith | Member of the New York State Senate from the 20th district 1993–2001 | Succeeded by Carl Andrews |
Political offices
| Preceded by Howard Golden | Borough President of Brooklyn; 2002–2013 | Succeeded by Eric L. Adams |
