= Culture of Brooklyn =

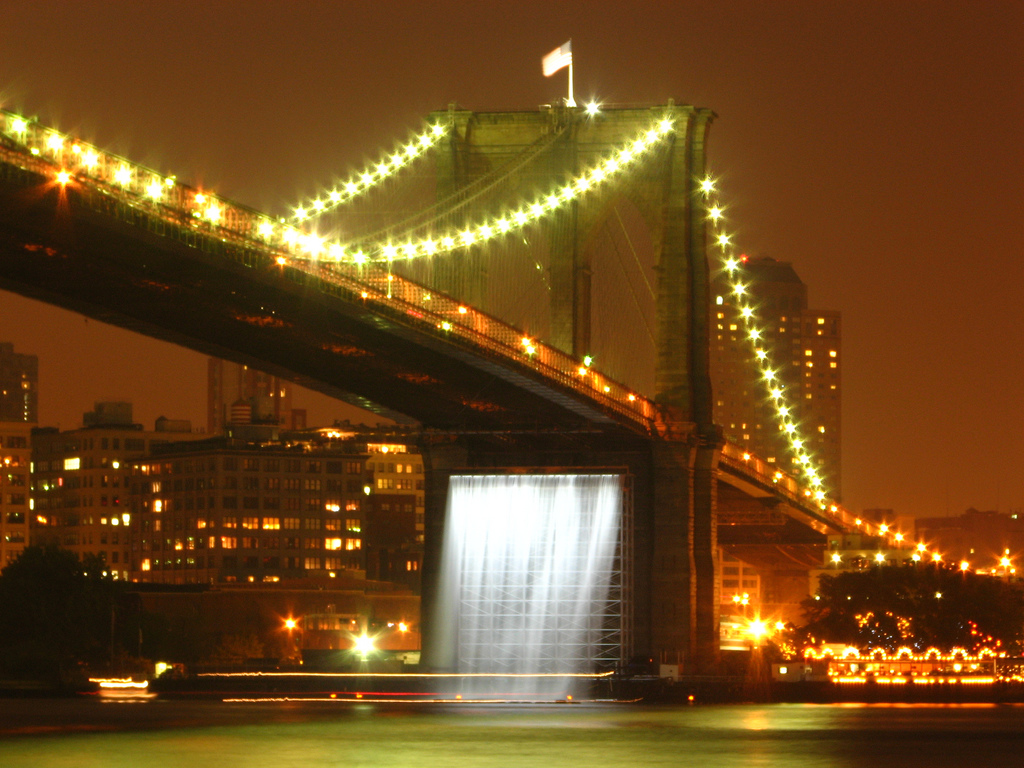
Olafur Eliasson's Waterfalls under the Brooklyn Bridge

Brooklyn has played a major role in various aspects of American culture including literature, cinema and theater as well as being home to the Brooklyn Academy of Music and to the second largest public art collection in the United States which is housed in the Brooklyn Museum.

== Literature ==
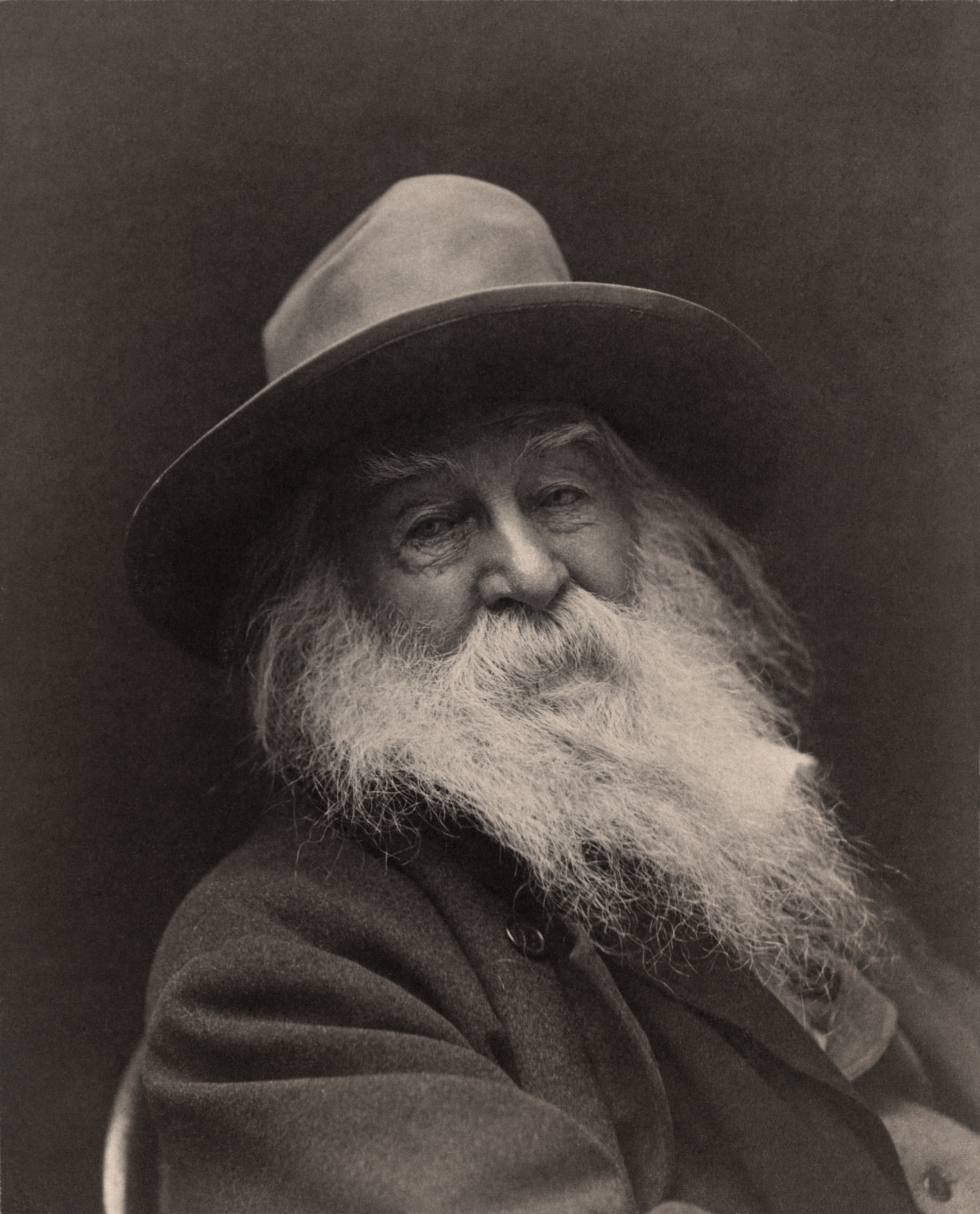
Walt Whitman wrote Crossing Brooklyn Ferry, a classic poem about the Brooklyn Waterfront

Walt Whitman wrote of the Brooklyn waterfront in his classic poem Crossing Brooklyn Ferry. Harlem Renaissance playwright Eulalie Spence taught at Eastern District High School in Brooklyn from 1927 to 1938, a time during which she wrote her critically acclaimed plays Fool's Errand, and Her.

In 1930, poet Hart Crane published the epic poem The Bridge, using the Brooklyn Bridge as central symbol and poetic starting point. The novels of Henry Miller include reflections on several of the ethnic German and Jewish neighborhoods of Brooklyn during the 1890s and early 20th century; his novels Tropic of Capricorn and The Rosy Crucifixion include long tracts describing his childhood and young adulthood spent in the borough.

Betty Smith's 1943 book A Tree Grows in Brooklyn, and the 1945 film based on it, are among the best-known early works about life in Brooklyn. The tree in the title is the Tree of Heaven.

There's a tree that grows in Brooklyn. Some people call it the Tree of Heaven. No matter where its seed falls, it makes a tree which struggles to reach the sky. It grows in boarded up lots and out of neglected rubbish heaps. It grows up out of cellar gratings. It is the only tree that grows out of cement. It grows lushly...survives without sun, water, and seemingly earth. It would be considered beautiful except that there are too many of it.

— A Tree Grows in Brooklyn, Introduction

Chaim Potok, rabbi and Brooklyn resident, wrote The Chosen, a book about two Jewish boys growing up in Brooklyn that was published in 1947. William Styron's novel Sophie's Choice is set in Flatbush, just off Prospect Park, during the summer of 1947. Arthur Miller's 1955 play A View From the Bridge, and Paule Marshall's 1959 novel, Brown Girl, Brownstones, about Barbadian immigrants during the Depression and World War II, are both set in Brooklyn.

More recently, Brooklyn-born author Jonathan Lethem has written several books about growing up in the borough, including Motherless Brooklyn and The Fortress of Solitude. The neighborhood of Park Slope is home to many contemporary writers, including Jonathan Safran Foer, Jhumpa Lahiri, Jonathan Franzen, Rick Moody, Jennifer Egan, Kathryn Harrison, Paul Auster, Franco Ambriz, Nicole Krauss, Colson Whitehead, Darin Strauss, Siri Hustvedt and Suketu Mehta, among others.

== Film ==
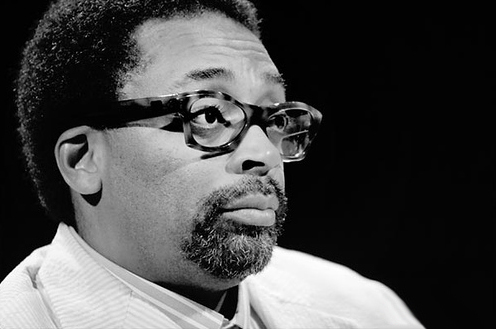
Spike Lee directed She's Gotta Have It and Do The Right Thing, which gave Brooklyn a new cultural prominence

Brooklyn has played a key role in multiple films of various genres, from the 1917 Fatty Arbuckle comedy Coney Island to the 2011 coming-out film Pariah.

One iconic Brooklyn film is 1945's A Tree Grows In Brooklyn, based on Betty Smith's novel of the same name. It was the first film directed by Greek-American director Elia Kazan, starring James Dunn (who won the Academy Award for Best Supporting Actor), Dorothy McGuire, Joan Blondell, and Peggy Ann Garner (who won the Academy Juvenile Award). Around that time other Hollywood films also depicted Brooklyn of that era and milieu, like the dark comedy Arsenic and Old Lace.

Saturday Night Fever starring John Travolta, a 1977 movie which defined the Disco era in the United States, was set in Bay Ridge, an Italian neighborhood in southern Brooklyn. Working class Jewish communities were depicted in films like 1977's Annie Hall and 1986's Brighton Beach Memoirs.

In the late 1980s, African-American communities in Brooklyn achieved a new cultural prominence with the films of Spike Lee, whose She's Gotta Have It and Do The Right Thing were shot in Brooklyn neighborhoods. Other films in this vein include Straight Out of Brooklyn and Just Another Girl on the I.R.T..

The nostalgic 2005 film The Squid and the Whale, by Noah Baumbach, examined the family life of the Park Slope intelligentsia. In the 2000s, queer dramas like Shortbus and provocative documentaries like Battle for Brooklyn and Trembling Before G-d also showed then-new facets of Brooklyn. In the 2010s, some mainstream and independent films like The Intern and Obvious Child reflected a more gentrified North Brooklyn.

Other films set in Brooklyn include Brooklyn Bridge, Brooklyn Castle and Brooklyn Matters.

== Television ==
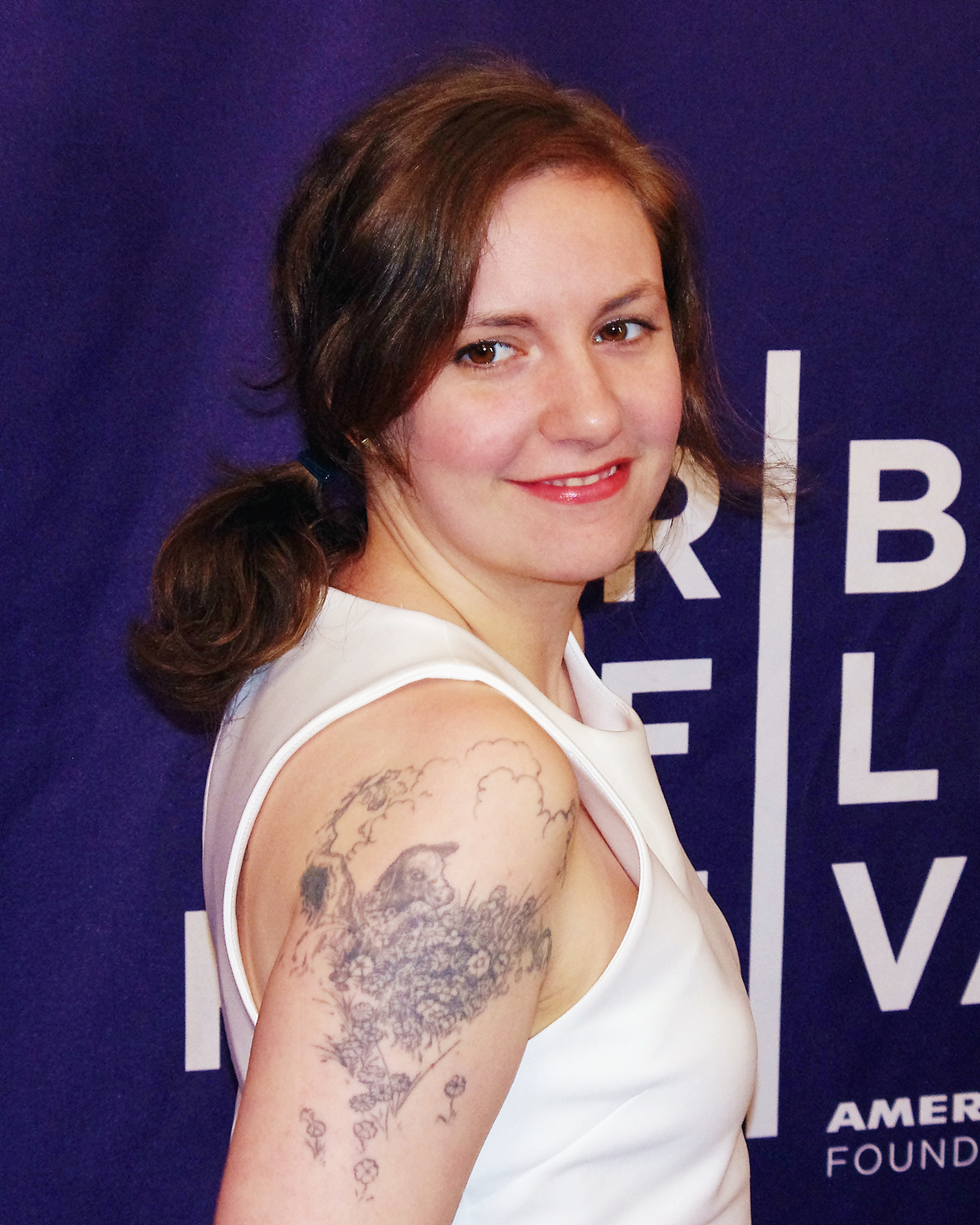
Lena Dunham is the star and creator of Girls, which is set in the "hipster Brooklyn" of Greenpoint and Williamsburg.

Brooklyn has been the setting for a variety of television shows, including the 1950s era Honeymooners starring Jackie Gleason, and the 1970s sitcom, Welcome Back, Kotter, starring Gabe Kaplan. In the 1980s, The Cosby Show was set in a Brooklyn Heights brownstone. In the 1990s, Brooklyn Bridge (about a Jewish American family living in Brooklyn in the middle 1950s) starring Marion Ross aired on CBS.

In the 2010s, a number of shows focused on young, primarily white people in gentrified areas like Williamsburg, including Girls on HBO and 2 Broke Girls on CBS, as well as culturally mixed shows like Brooklyn Nine-Nine on NBC.

Additionally, many shows are filmed in Brooklyn even if they are not set there, such as The Good Wife (set in Chicago) and Boardwalk Empire (set in Atlantic City).

== Theater ==
The Brooklyn Academy of Music (BAM) includes a 2,109-seat opera house, an 874-seat Theater, and the art house BAM Rose Cinemas. Bargemusic and St. Ann's Warehouse are on the other side of Downtown Brooklyn in the DUMBO arts district.

Lynn Nottage's 1995 play Crumbs from the Table of Joy is set in post-World War II Brooklyn and deals with the hopes and frustrations of an African American family recently arrived from Florida. Neil Simon's 1983 play Brighton Beach Memoirs is set in 1937 Brooklyn.

== Music ==
Brooklyn has an active contemporary classical music scene led by the Brooklyn Philharmonic, now over 150 years old.

The Brooklyn Jazz Hall of Fame and Museum is located in Brooklyn.

Many pioneers and icons of hip hop were from Brooklyn, like the Notorious B.I.G., Jay Z, and the Beastie Boys.

Punk rock pioneers like Patti Smith and The Shirts were based in Brooklyn in the 1970s. Around the turn of the millennium, North Brooklyn neighborhoods like Williamsburg, Greenpoint, and Bushwick developed a major rock scene that incubated bands like the Yeah Yeah Yeahs, Grizzly Bear, TV on the Radio and the Dirty Projectors.

In the early 2000s the Williamsburg neighborhood became a center of electroclash with bands like Fischerspooner and promoter Larry Tee making a local breakthrough with the scene via his Berliniamsburg party at the Luxx Club and the Electroclash Festival in 2001.

Brooklyn served as the birthplace of hip hop's Beast Coast movement from the early 2010's and onward, with its key members being associates and long-time friends. They eventually joined forces in an official capacity and the subsequent supergroup consists of artists/acts Joey Bada$$ of Pro Era, hip hop trio Flatbush Zombies, and hip hop duo The Underachievers.

The late 2010s saw a resurgence in the borough’s rap scene with the emergence of Brooklyn drill, a fusion of Chicago and UK drill music. Several of the scene’s pioneers, most notably Pop Smoke, are from the southeastern sections of the Brooklyn. The genre has since spread throughout the city and is especially popular with local born black and Latin youth.

== Art ==
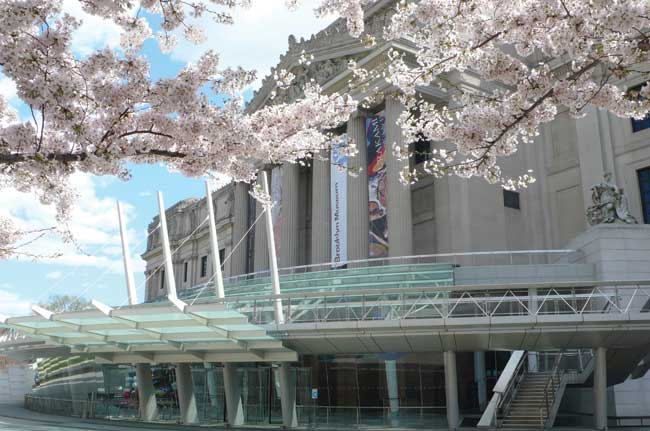
The front facade of the Brooklyn Museum

The Brooklyn Museum, opened in 1897, the nation's second largest public art museum, includes in its permanent collection more than 1.5 million objects, from ancient Egyptian masterpieces to contemporary art. The Brooklyn Children's Museum, the world's first museum dedicated to children, opened in December 1899. The only such New York State institution accredited by the American Association of Museums, it is one of the few globally to have a permanent collection - 30,000+ cultural objects and natural history specimens.

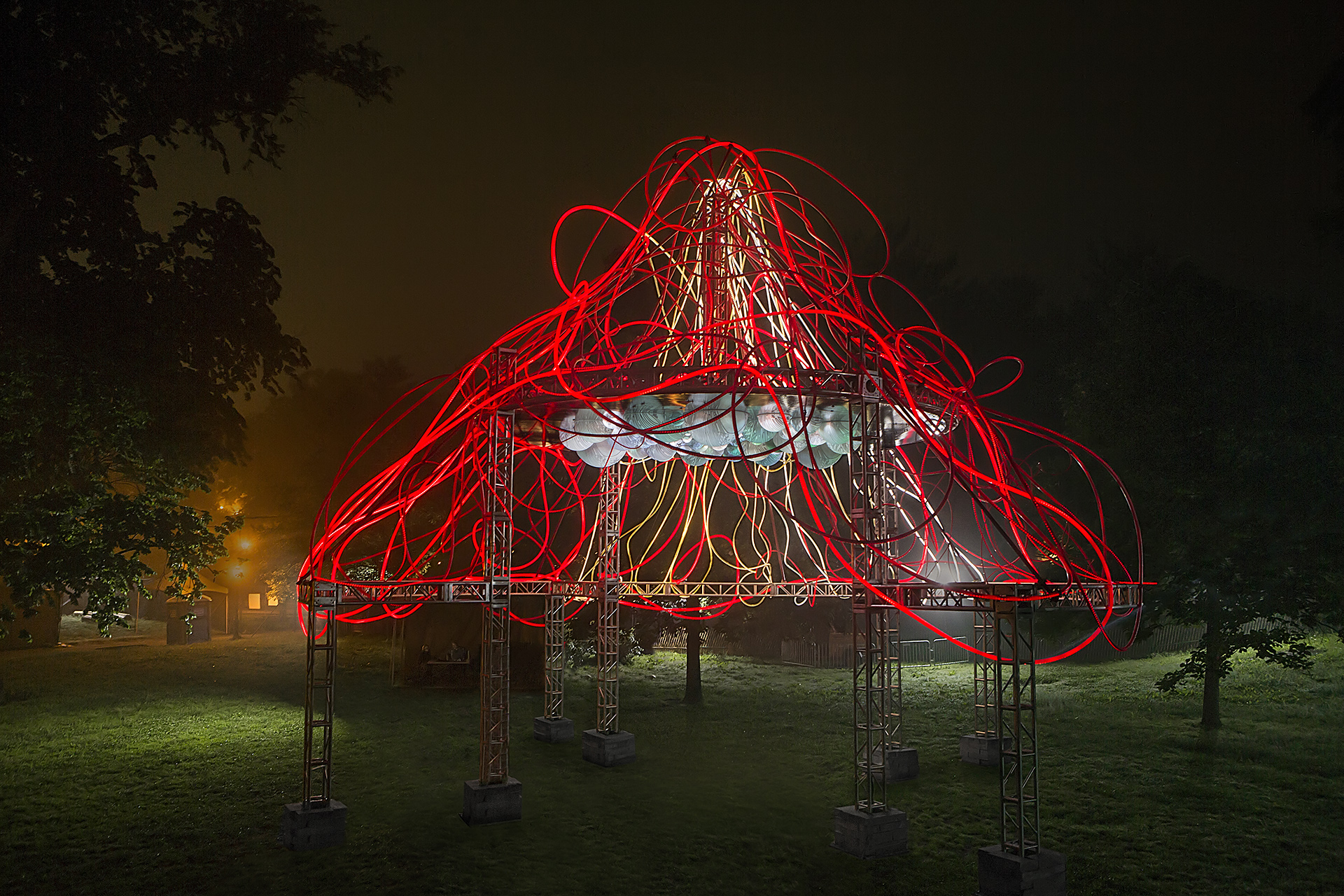
Grimanesa Amorós, Hedera, Prospect Park, Brooklyn, 2018.

BRIC Arts' Rotunda Gallery, founded in 1981, is the oldest not-for-profit gallery dedicated to presenting contemporary art work by artists who are from, live, or work in the borough.

== Architecture ==
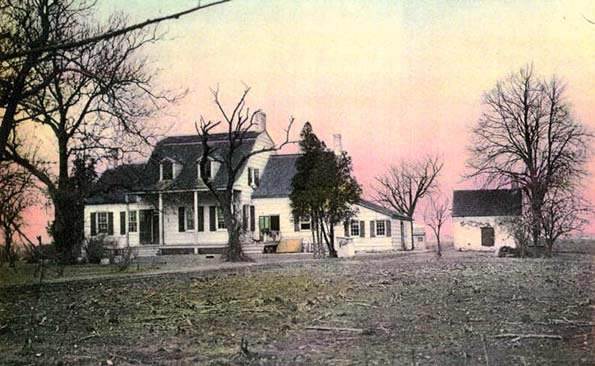
The Hendrick I. Lott House

There are a wide array of architectural styles represented in Brooklyn. The architectural eras and styles range from original Dutch colonial architecture represented by such historic homes as the Hendrick I. Lott House to Dutch Colonial Revival architecture, Art Deco to Post-modern.

== Gallery ==
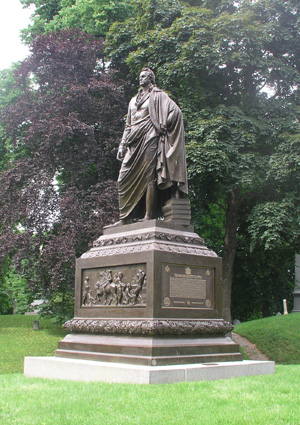
DeWitt Clinton memorial at Green-Wood Cemetery

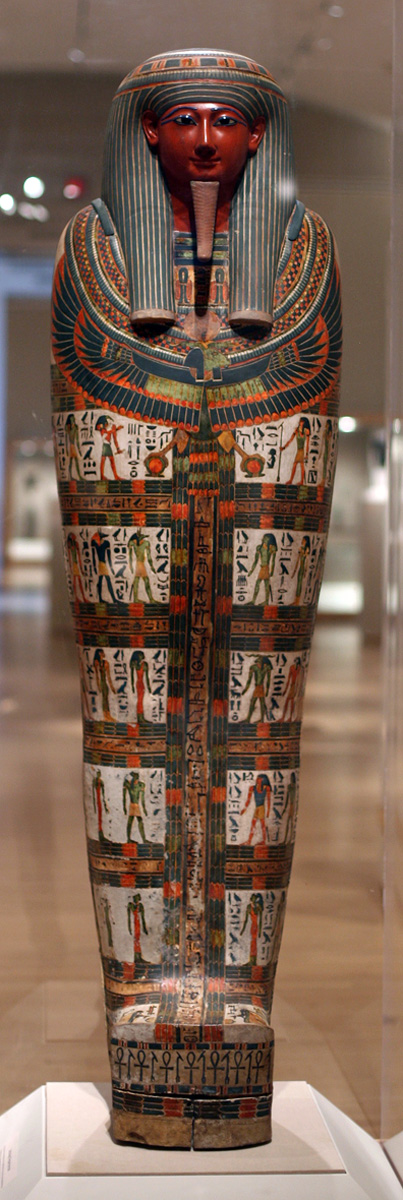
Cartonnage of Nespanetjerenpere at the Brooklyn Museum

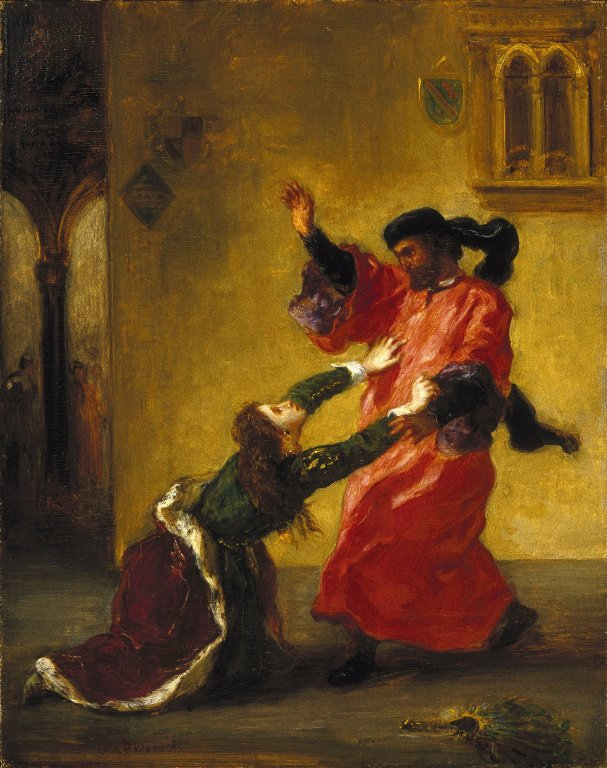
Desdemona Cursed by her Father, Eugène Delacroix
