= Imaginary Johnny =

American rock band

- Origin: Seattle, Washington, United States (formation); Brooklyn, New York, United States
- Genres: Indie rock
- Years active: Since 2003; 22 years ago
- Labels: Unfinished Side Productions
- Members: Stuart Wolferman; Adam Sylvia; Marc Alan Goodman; Andrew Soto
- Past members: Zach Barocas; Ismail Lawal; John C.F. David; Janice Cruz; Maura Di Berardinis
- Website: imaginaryjohnny.com

Imaginary Johnny is an American indie-rock band, formed in 2003 in Seattle, Washington, by singer-songwriter Stuart Wolferman and later based in Brooklyn, New York.

After releasing the extended-play album Upside of the Downside in 2003, Wolferman moved to Brooklyn from Seattle, Washington, and began collaborating with new members, including Adam Sylvia on guitar and Marc Alan Goodman on bass, among a rotating group of performance and studio musicians.

The band has released five albums, including Dig (2011), with PopMatters saying "at its best the band has a light, discreet, dreamy, and vaguely 'psychedelic' charm."

== History ==
=== Upside of the Downside (2003) ===
The band started as the solo bedroom recording project of Wolferman while he was studying audio engineering at the University of Washington in Seattle. Originally from Kansas City, Missouri, Wolferman released the first EP, Upside of the Downside, in 2003.

The EP attracted some attention in independent music outlets, with TrampolineHouse.com writing "Imaginary Johnny crosses genre borders with no passport seamlessly incorporating electronics, acoustics and his crystal-clear voice. Give the man a beat and a keyboard, and he'll spin a yarn, the likes of which you've never heard." Magnet wrote "If the debut from Imaginary Johnny is any indication of what's to come, Belle and Sebastian best be watching its back. Muffled broadcasts and tweaked-out squiggles peg lyrics about instant coffee, tropical rain storms and purple-clad prostitutes."

=== Painting Over the Dirt (2006) ===
Wolferman's first full-length album, Painting Over the Dirt, was mostly written in Seattle, but also included some songs he created after moving to Brooklyn. He mostly tracked the album himself in his bedroom, but later began working with producer and engineer Joel Hamilton in a studio setting to mix the album. Hamilton had previously worked with Lou Reed, Justin Timberlake and RJD2. The album was released on January 24, 2006.

It received a positive review and received 3.5/5 stars from Allmusic, who wrote "[p]itched somewhere between the Postal Service's indie electronica and the bedsit romanticism of Belle & Sebastian or the Clientele, Painting Over the Dirt fuses smart, melodic pop songwriting to a melancholy worldview exemplified by Wolferman's barely there vocals and minor-key tunes." A separate review stated, "[w]hether through words or sounds, it never feels artificial and never overriding. This, in a sense, is indie-pop's equivalent to Willie Nelson's Red Headed Stranger".

=== No Air (2007) ===
While in Brooklyn, Wolferman began to recruit other band-members, making Imaginary Johnny into a full group.

In 2007, the band released the EP No Air, which had been recorded in two days in November 2005. It was tracked and mixed at the Magpie Cage with J. Robbins. It included Sylvia on guitar, Wolferman on keyboards and vocals, Eric Morse on electronic noises, and Zach Barocas, the former drummer of Jawbox, on drums. It was the first of the band's releases to have a sound more akin to rock music.

=== Only Chimneys (2008) ===
The band released the album Only Chimneys in 2008 on Unfinished Side Productions. It was again produced and mixed by Hamilton, and included vocals from Wolferman and Janice Cruz, Sylvia on guitar and bass guitar, John C.F. David on double bass, Wolferman on keyboards, Ismail Lawal on drums, and Maura Di Berardinis on violin. Unlike Wolferman's previously sparse compositions, the album included string arrangements and horns.

A review stated, "[t]echnically a near-perfect recording (produced by Brooklyn's decorated soundman Joel Hamilton), Only Chimneys flows with grace, mostly holding its balances well. Musical jellybeans of every flavour are scattered all over: a banjo's stealthy twang, a sudden surge of splendid, indulgent strings, a breath of ethereal piano, a makeshift choir, even a French horn – each a delight to pick out and savour. The vocals, however, are the true focal point of the record. Wolferman's clear, luminous voice articulates emotion almost uncannily."

Starting in May 2008, the band toured the East Coast in support of the album. In summer of 2008 the album was placed in the top slot on the eMusic "powerchart". In October 2008 the band played a bill at the CMJ Music Marathon, along with Starcode, Lucinda Black Bear, Kaiser Cartel and Sky Cries Mary. The track "Everyone Has a Texas Song" was selected as a 2009 International Songwriting Competition semi-finalist.

In 2010, the band began a one-song-a-month recording project, where at the end of each month they recorded a new song at Strange Weather Brooklyn, after which a video was made a month later. The project started with the track "Midwest Scorpions". A Row Films music video directed by Robert Greene was later created for the track "Soak City", and released on NME's website.

=== Dig (2011) ===
"To Be Excused"
Sample of the track "To Be Excused" off the 2011 album Dig

The band released the album Dig in 2011. It again included Sylvia and Wolferman, and was produced by Goodman, who also contributed bass. Both Lawal and Andrew Soto provided drums to the recordings. It was mixed at Strange Weather Brooklyn.

According to PopMatters about the album, "at its best the band has a light, discreet, dreamy, and vaguely 'psychedelic' charm for people who might want a downshift from the surreal romantic grandeur of Flaming Lips, the ethereal bombast of Mercury Rev, the wooden retro-authenticity of Fleet Foxes, or the anguished chiming sincerity of Iron and Wine."

=== Members ===
- Stuart Wolferman – vocals, keys
- Adam Sylvia – guitar
- Marc Alan Goodman – bass
- Andrew Soto – drums

==== Past members ====
- Zach Barocas – drums
- Ismail Lawal – drums
- Jessie Torrisi
- Kristin Fayne-Mulroy
- Eric Morse

=== Discography ===
==== Studio albums ====
- 2003: Upside of the Downside (extended play)
- 2006: Painting Over the Dirt
- 2007: No Air EP
- 2008: Only Chimneys
- 2011: Dig

== See also ==
- Culture of Brooklyn
- List of indie-rock musicians
- Music of New York City
- Music of Seattle
