= Brooklyn Matters =

- Release date: 2007
- Running time: 82 minutes
- Country: United States
- Language: English

Brooklyn Matters is a 2007 documentary film, produced and directed by Isabel Hill and edited by Marian Sears Hunter.

The film describes the fight against the Atlantic Yards development project in Brooklyn, New York. Atlantic Yards is Bruce Ratner's Forest City Development and the Empire State Development Corporation's plan to build a New York Nets basketball arena and 17 office and apartment buildings along Atlantic Avenue in Brooklyn, New York. The film includes interviews with Paul Goldberger, Bob Law, then-Councilwoman Letitia James and Julia Vitullo-Martin and shows the community input meeting for the project's environmental impact statement.

Chuck Clifton, director of photography, and Michelle Clifton, sound recordist, were also involved in the making of the movie.

A screening of the film in February 2007 at Bishop Loughlin Memorial High School in Fort Greene attracted verbal and physical aggression from people apparently in support of the development.
