= Fourth Avenue (Brooklyn) =

Avenue in Brooklyn, New York

Coordinates: 40°39′00″N 74°00′32″W

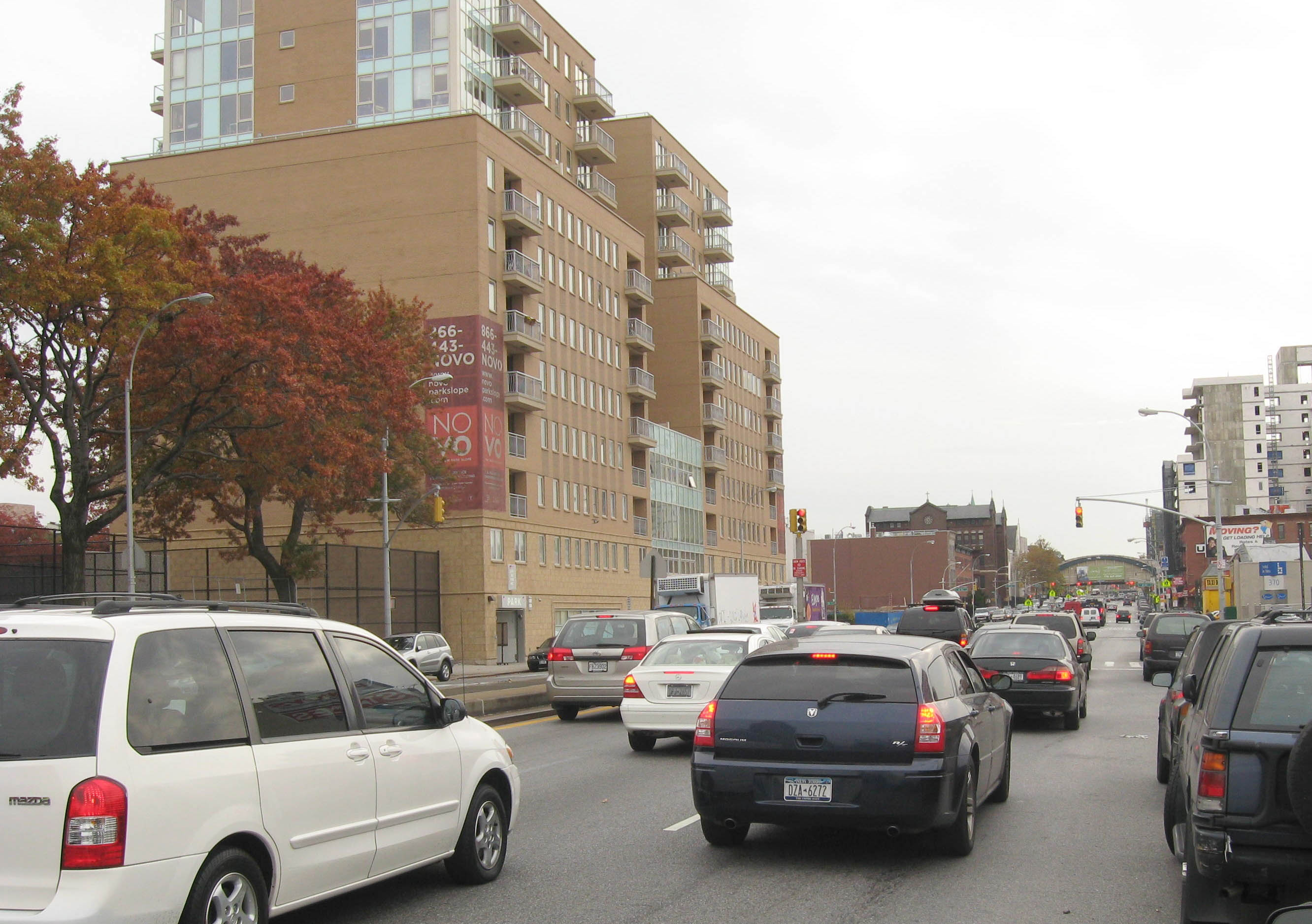
- Looking south at Fourth Street in 2008
- Interactive map of Fourth Avenue
- Owner: City of New York
- Maintained by: NYCDOT
- Length: 5.9 mi (9.5 km)
- Location: Brooklyn, New York City
- South end: Belt Parkway / Shore Road in Bay Ridge
- Major junctions: I-278 in Sunset Park; NY 27 in South Slope
- North end: Flatbush Avenue / Atlantic Avenue in Downtown Brooklyn
- East: Fifth Avenue
- West: Third Avenue

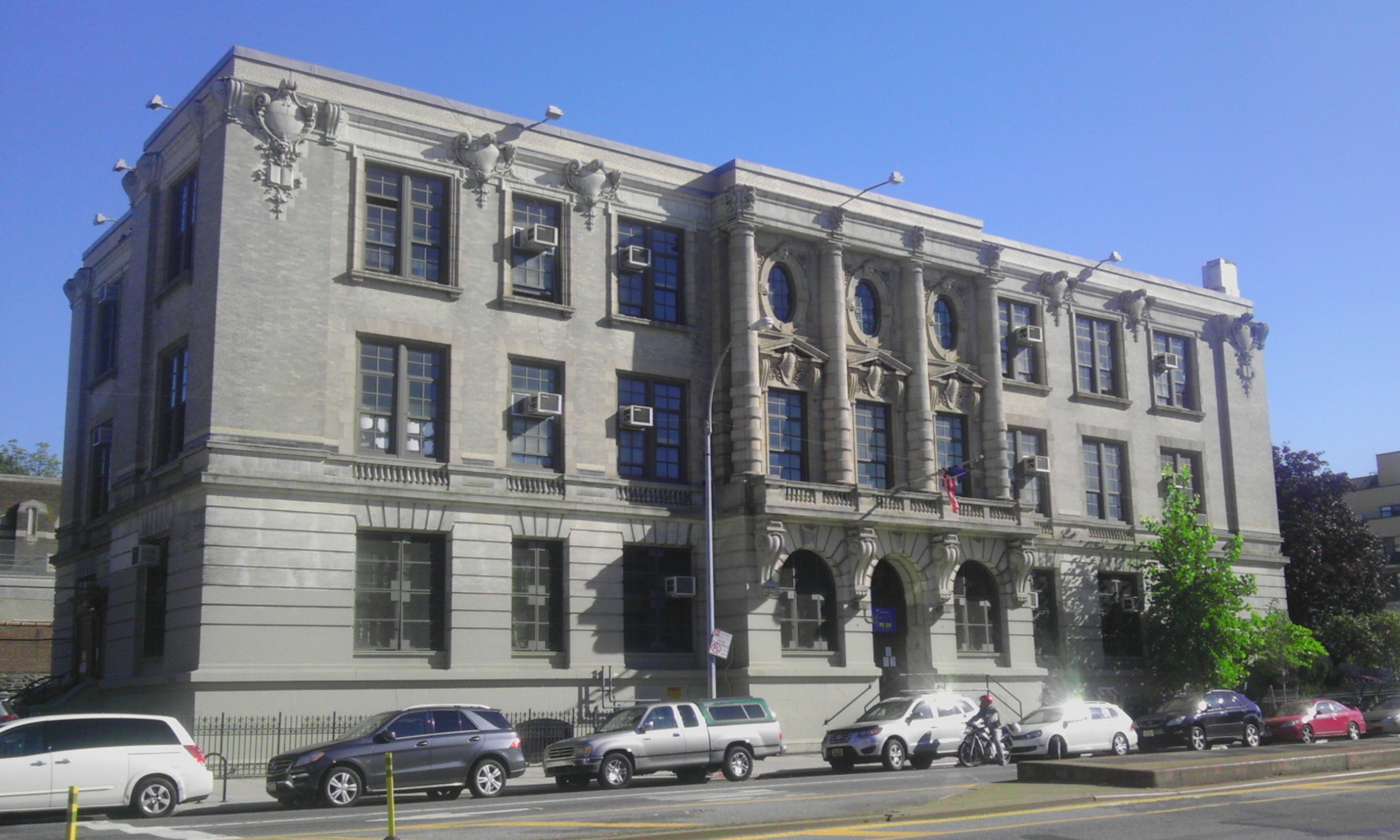
13th Street

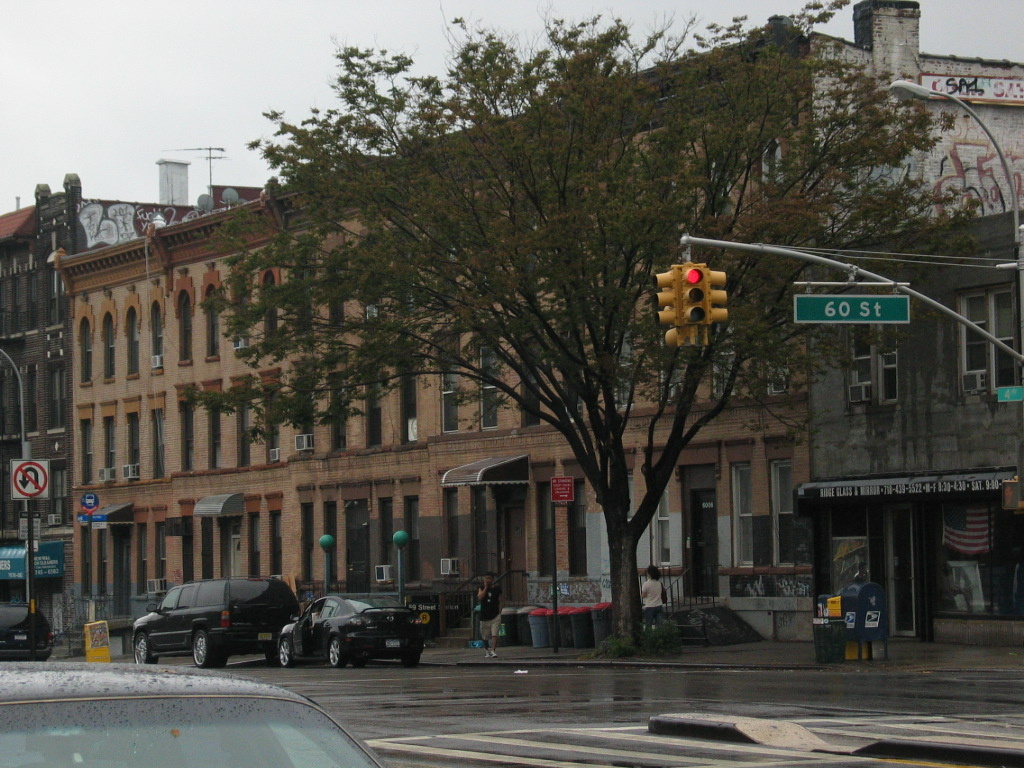
60th Street

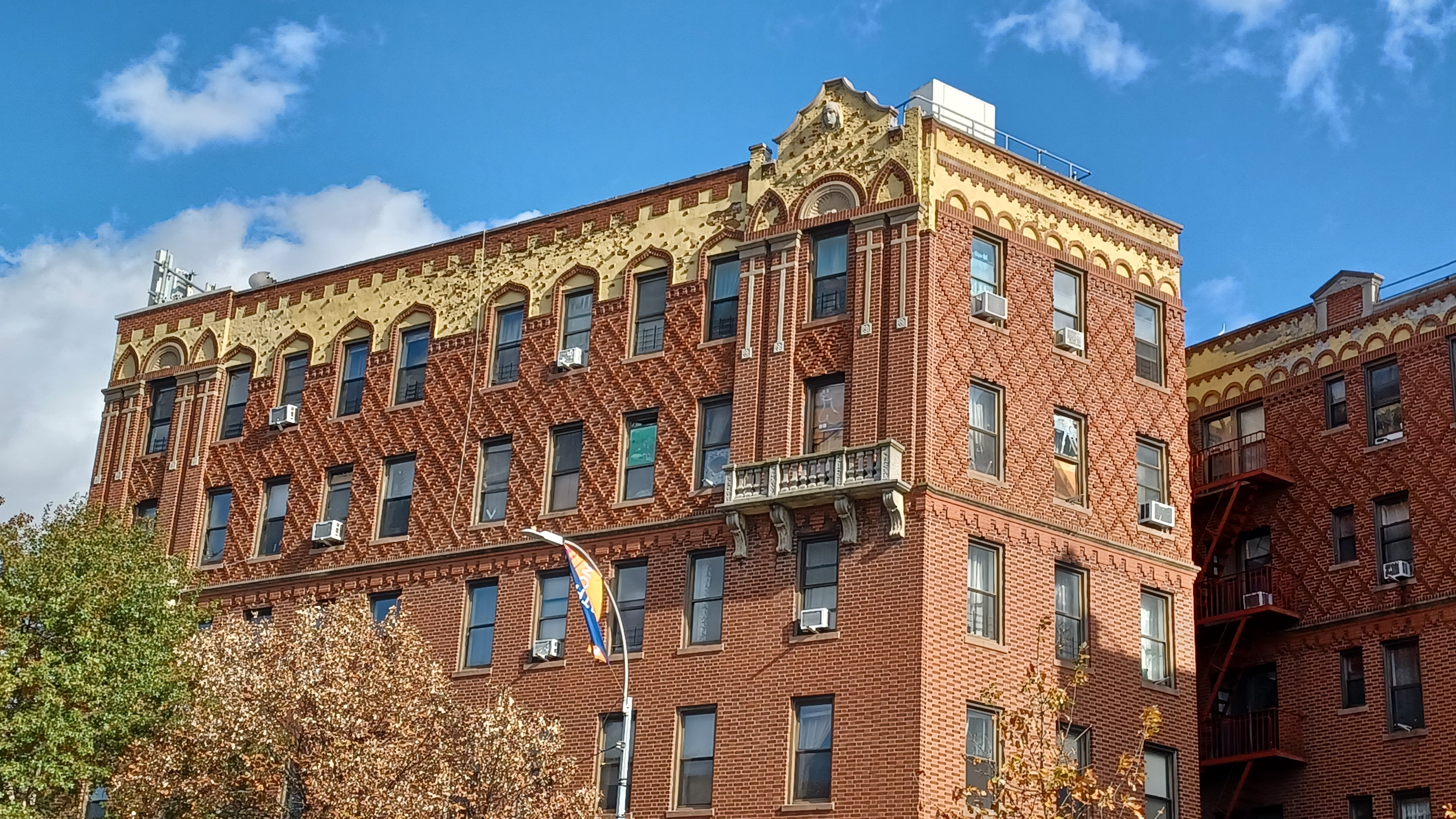
Residential building on 4th avenue & 85th Street, in Brooklyn, NY

Fourth Avenue is a major thoroughfare in the New York City borough of Brooklyn. It stretches for 6 miles (9.7 km) south from Times Plaza, which is the triangle intersection created by Atlantic and Flatbush Avenues in Downtown Brooklyn, to Shore Road and the Belt Parkway in Bay Ridge.

While southwestern Brooklyn is well served by expressways, Fourth Avenue provides an alternate for local traffic as it directly links the neighborhoods of Park Slope, Sunset Park and Bay Ridge with Downtown Brooklyn. Traffic signals along the avenue are coordinated for a green wave in the peak direction.

== Description ==
Fourth Avenue begins at Times Plaza, the triangle intersection it forms with Flatbush and Atlantic Avenues at the foot of the Williamsburgh Savings Bank Tower and Atlantic Terminal in Downtown Brooklyn. The avenue extends south with three traffic lanes in each direction and a one-lane-wide concrete divider that provides a left-turn lane. The concrete divider is actually part of the ventilation system for the BMT Fourth Avenue Line, which lies directly underneath. While six lanes are provided, only four lanes get full use, since the outer two are used by double-parked vehicles and as a right-turn lane.

On its course through Park Slope, Fourth Avenue is home to several condominiums and homes but until recently was dominated by service stations and automotive repair centers, some of which remain in service.

Upon entering Sunset Park, Fourth Avenue passes under the Prospect Expressway (NY 27) and offers indirect access to it through local side streets. The avenue continues to serve the automotive trade as far as the streets numbered in the low 40s, where it becomes flanked by large apartment buildings.

After crossing under the Gowanus Expressway viaduct into Bay Ridge, the arterial boulevard gives way to a four-lane street bordered by four- to five- story apartment buildings until it reaches Shore Road and the Belt Parkway under the Verrazzano–Narrows Bridge.

== History ==
The avenue was paved in the 1890s as a grand parkway resembling Manhattan's Fourth Avenue, which was later rebuilt and renamed to Park Avenue. The Fourth Avenue in Brooklyn was rebuilt after 1910 to accommodate more traffic.

On October 25, 1962, Mayor Robert F. Wagner Jr. requested that the New York City Board of Estimate approve an expenditure of $724,572 for the reconstruction of subway structures and entrances along the Fourth Avenue subway line in order to accommodate the widening of Fourth Avenue between 60th Street and Atlantic Avenue, which was to be accomplished by narrowing the street's sidewalks. At the time of the request, 80% of the work on the project was completed. Work had started on the project, which cost $1 million, several months earlier. The contract that the Mayor had requested approval for would have relocated vault lights, gratings, entrances and exits at 56th Street and 49th Street, and at the 45th Street, 53rd Street and 59th Street stations.

In 2003 under Mayor Michael Bloomberg, a stretch of Fourth Avenue 30 blocks (one and a half miles) long was rezoned to permit twelve story residential development in addition to the commercial uses already permitted. In the ensuing years, more than thirty new buildings have been built along the avenue adding as many as 2,000 new apartment units. Ground floor retail development and the construction of a new NYC public primary school have followed.

Protected bike lanes, separated from vehicular traffic by a lane of parking, were proposed for Fourth Avenue in 2017 in an attempt to improve cycling infrastructure in New York City. The first bike lanes were added between 60th and 64th Streets within Sunset Park in 2018, followed by the section between 1st and 15th Streets in Park Slope in early 2019. Due to ongoing reconstruction work on the Fourth Avenue subway tunnel, the section between 60th and 38th Streets could not receive bike lanes until the reconstruction was completed. In August 2019, following several cyclist deaths citywide, the NYCDOT announced that the remainder of Fourth Avenue between 38th and 60th Streets would receive protected bike lanes by late 2020.

== Churches ==
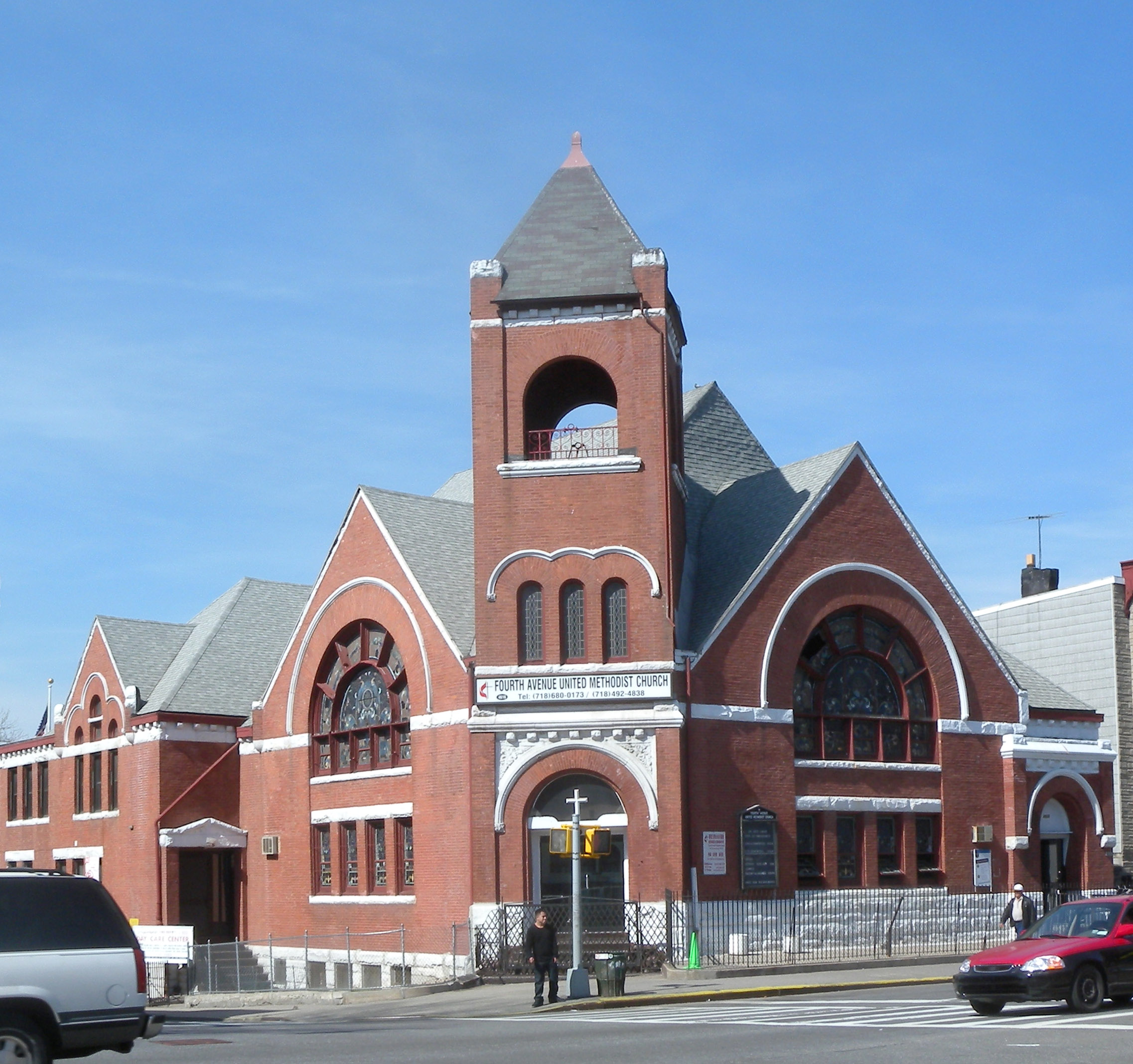
Fourth Avenue United Methodist Church

The borough has a thoroughfare named Church Avenue (named for an 18th-century church), which, contrary to its name, does not rival the large number of later churches located along Fourth Avenue. At Fourth Avenue's intersection with 54th Street in Sunset Park, there are four houses of worship either directly at the corner of the intersection or within a building. Two of the churches stand side by side.

== Public transportation ==
The BMT Fourth Avenue Line (D, N, R, and W trains) of the New York City Subway runs the length of Fourth Avenue. Stations are located at Atlantic Avenue, Union Street, Ninth Street, Prospect Avenue, 25th Street, 36th Street, 45th Street, 53rd Street, 59th Street, Bay Ridge Avenue, 77th Street, 86th Street, and 95th Street, with express stations at Atlantic Avenue, 36th Street, and 59th Street.

MTA Regional Bus Operations operates several routes, none of which serve the avenue significantly:

- The B103 Limited route has the longest stretch, traveling southbound on 4th Avenue from Flatbush Avenue to 17th Street, which it uses to get onto the Prospect Expressway.
- The B70 runs between 39th Street and either 36th Street (Sunset Park) or 37th Street (Dyker Heights).
- The B11 runs from 49th to 55th Streets (Sunset Park), and from 52nd to 50th Streets (Midwood).
- The B9 runs between 60th Street and Bay Ridge Avenue.
- The B4 runs between Bay Ridge Parkway and either 78th Street (Bay Ridge) or 77th Street (Sheepshead Bay).
- The S79 SBS runs from 92nd Street to 86th Street, where it terminates. The S53 and S93 go in the opposite direction on this portion.
- All B8 buses that serve the Bay Ridge-95th Street station run from 92nd to 95th Streets, then change direction to Brownsville and continue to Marine Avenue.
- The Bay Ridge-bound B16, B37, X27 and X37 run from Marine Avenue to Shore Road, where they all terminate.
  - The B37 also runs from Atlantic Avenue to Bergen Street, where at Dean Street changes direction from Barclays Center to Bay Ridge.
- The B63 runs from 94th Street to Marine Avenue (Bay Ridge) and from Shore Road to 5th Avenue (Pier 6).
- The B1 uses the avenue from 87th to 86th Streets to change direction from Bay Ridge to Manhattan Beach.
