= Pacific Park, Brooklyn =

Development in Brooklyn, New York

Coordinates: 40.684226°N 73.977234°W

External images
- Atlantic Yards photo pool
- Photographer Tracy Collins's photos of the footprint/project

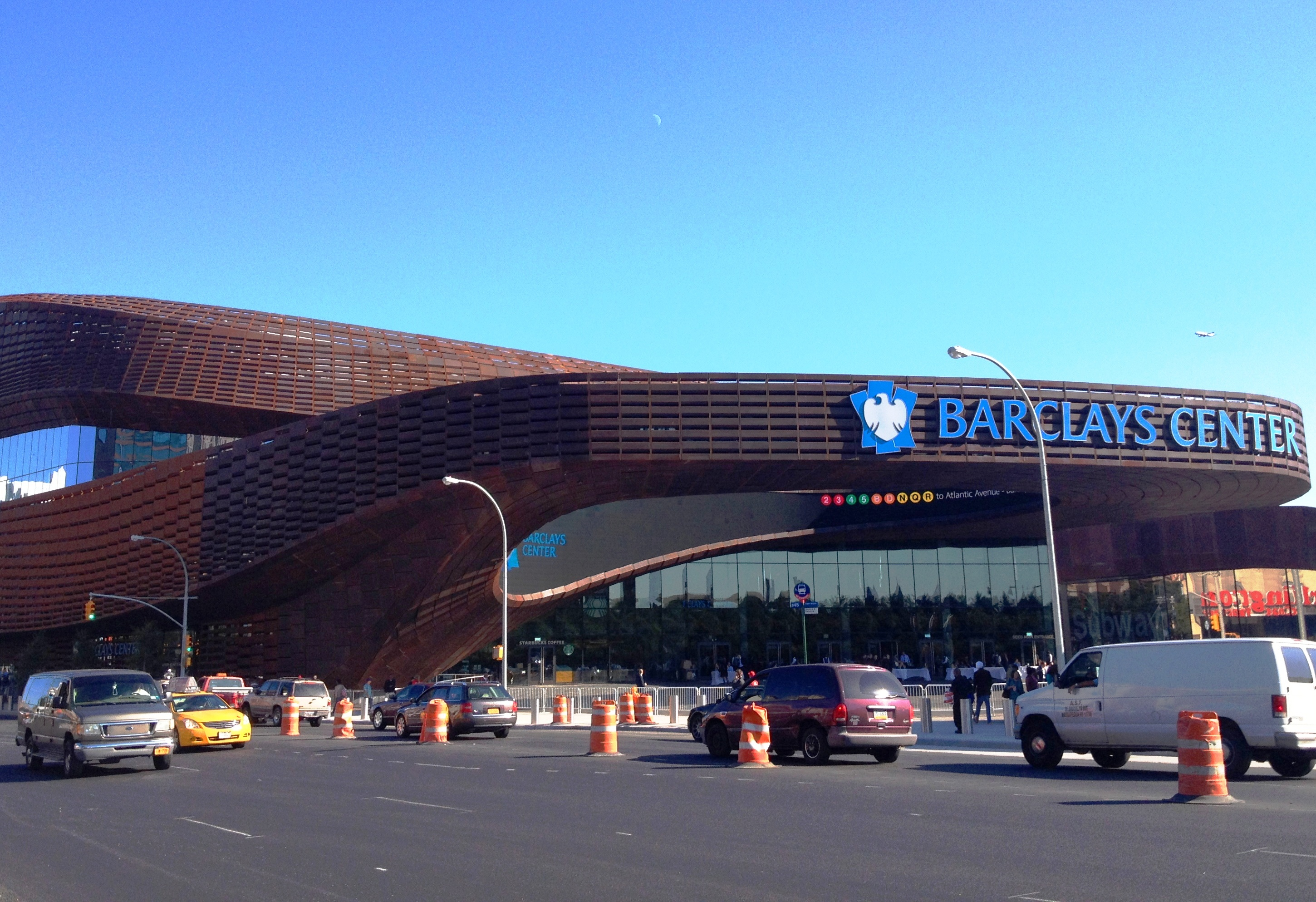
The completed Barclays Center, a large part of Pacific Park/Atlantic Yards, in September 2012

Pacific Park is a mixed-use commercial and residential development project by Forest City Ratner in Brooklyn, New York City. It will consist of 17 high-rise buildings near Brooklyn's Prospect Heights, adjacent to Downtown Brooklyn, Park Slope, and Fort Greene neighborhoods. The project overlaps part of the Atlantic Terminal Urban Renewal Area, but also extends toward the adjacent brownstone neighborhoods. Of the 22-acre (8.9 ha) project, 8.4 acres (3.4 ha) is located over a Long Island Rail Road train yard. A major component of the project is the Barclays Center sports arena, which opened on September 21, 2012. Formerly named Atlantic Yards, the project was renamed by the developer in August 2014 as part of a rebranding.

The development of Pacific Park is overseen by the Empire State Development Corporation. As of 2018, four of fifteen planned buildings had opened, but the deadline was delayed by about 10 years from 2025 to 2035. The residential component includes the world's tallest modular apartment building, 461 Dean, opened in November 2016.

== History ==
=== Context ===
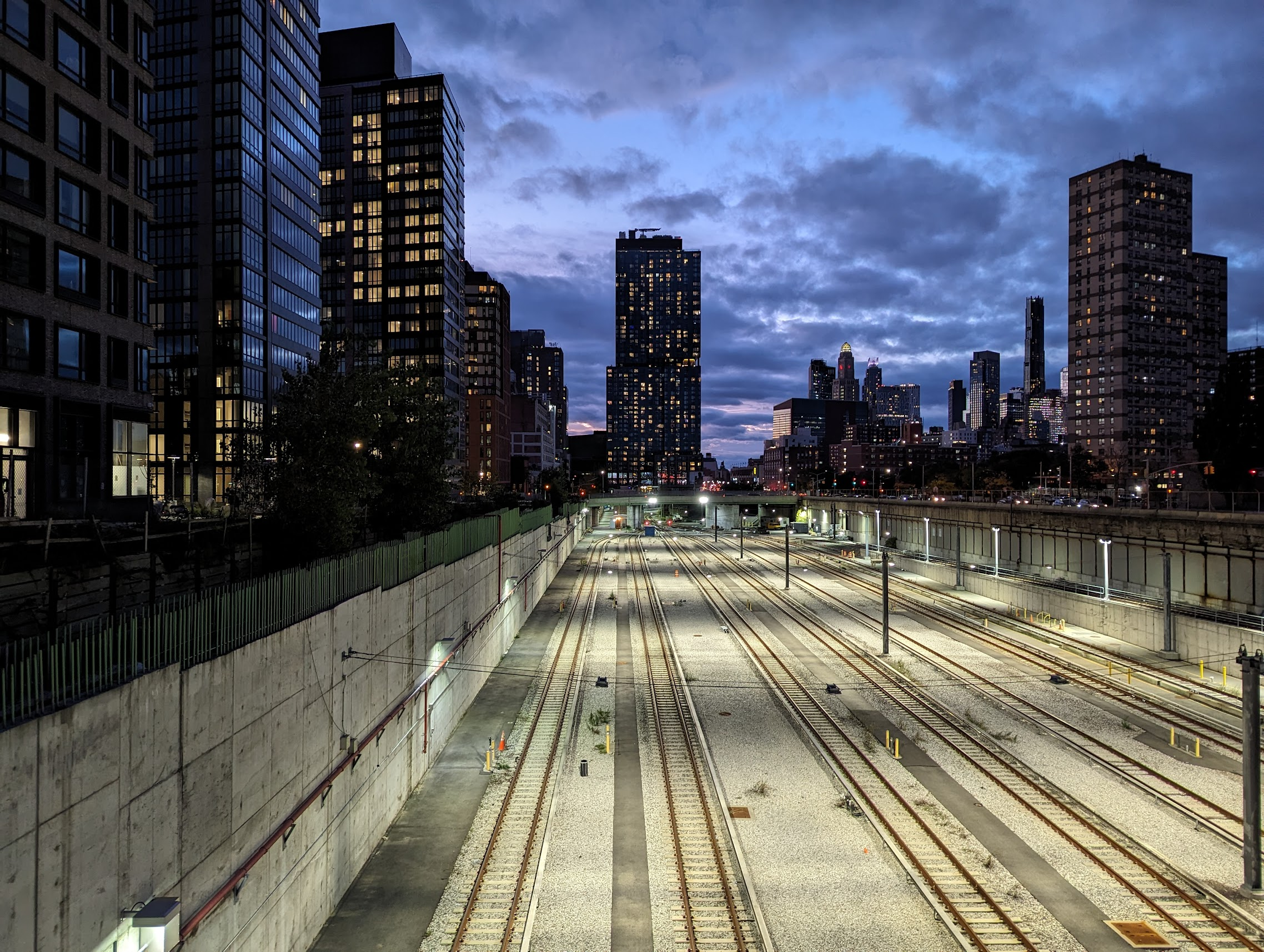
Reconstructed railyard surrounded by apartment buildings in 2023

Since the mid-20th century, there have been many proposals to develop the area around Flatbush and Atlantic Avenues, known as Times Plaza; however, plans for the area emerged only piecemeal. In the mid-1950s, Brooklyn Dodgers owner Walter O'Malley proposed that the city condemn the site, where he could then have built a new stadium for the ball club to replace Ebbets Field. City officials refused to condemn the property for subsequent sale to O'Malley on the grounds that they did not consider a privately financed baseball park to be an appropriate public purpose as defined under Title I of the Federal housing act of 1949. O'Malley's proposal was dismissed by Robert Moses for creating a Great Wall of traffic. In 1958, O'Malley relocated the Dodgers to Los Angeles. In 1968, Long Island University eyed the site, but was opposed by Mayor John V. Lindsay.

A 1968 New York Times article described a $250 million (over $1.4 billion in March 2006 dollars) plan for the Atlantic Terminal Urban Renewal Area, also known as ATURA. According to the Times, the renewal plan "calls for 2,400 new low- and middle-income housing units to replace 800 dilapidated units, removal of the blighting Fort Greene Meat Market, a 14-acre (6 ha) site for the City University's new Baruch College, two new parks, and community facilities such as day-care centers."

The 1970s also saw plans for ambitious projects in the area, and these mostly resulted in the construction of affordable housing on the north side of Atlantic Avenue. Baruch College also considered moving but was stymied by the city's fiscal crisis.

In the 1980s, a Fort Greene block association and other homeowners sued over an environmental impact statement that failed to consider how rerouted traffic would affect their neighborhood, one block away from the project. Then an economic downturn compounded community opposition. The Times reported that the stock market collapse had deterred office construction. "A lot of people are reassessing their expansion plans," James Stuckey, president of the city's Public Development Corporation, told the Times in 1988.

=== 2000s ===
Abandoned plan of 2008

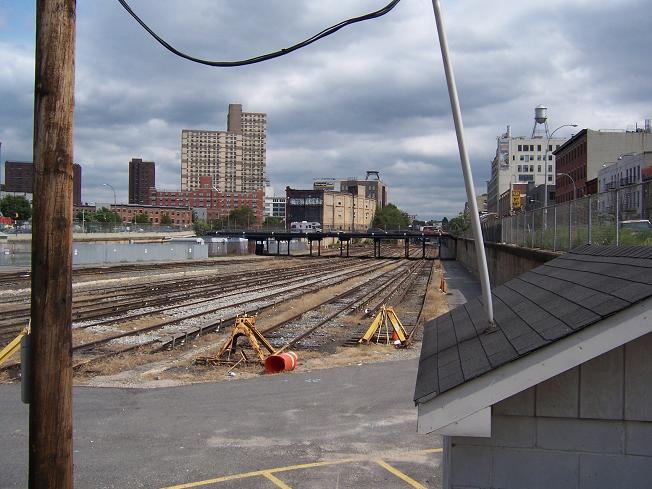
The Vanderbilt Railyards represents 8.4 acres (3.4 ha) of the 22-acre (8.9 ha) site (as seen in September 2006)

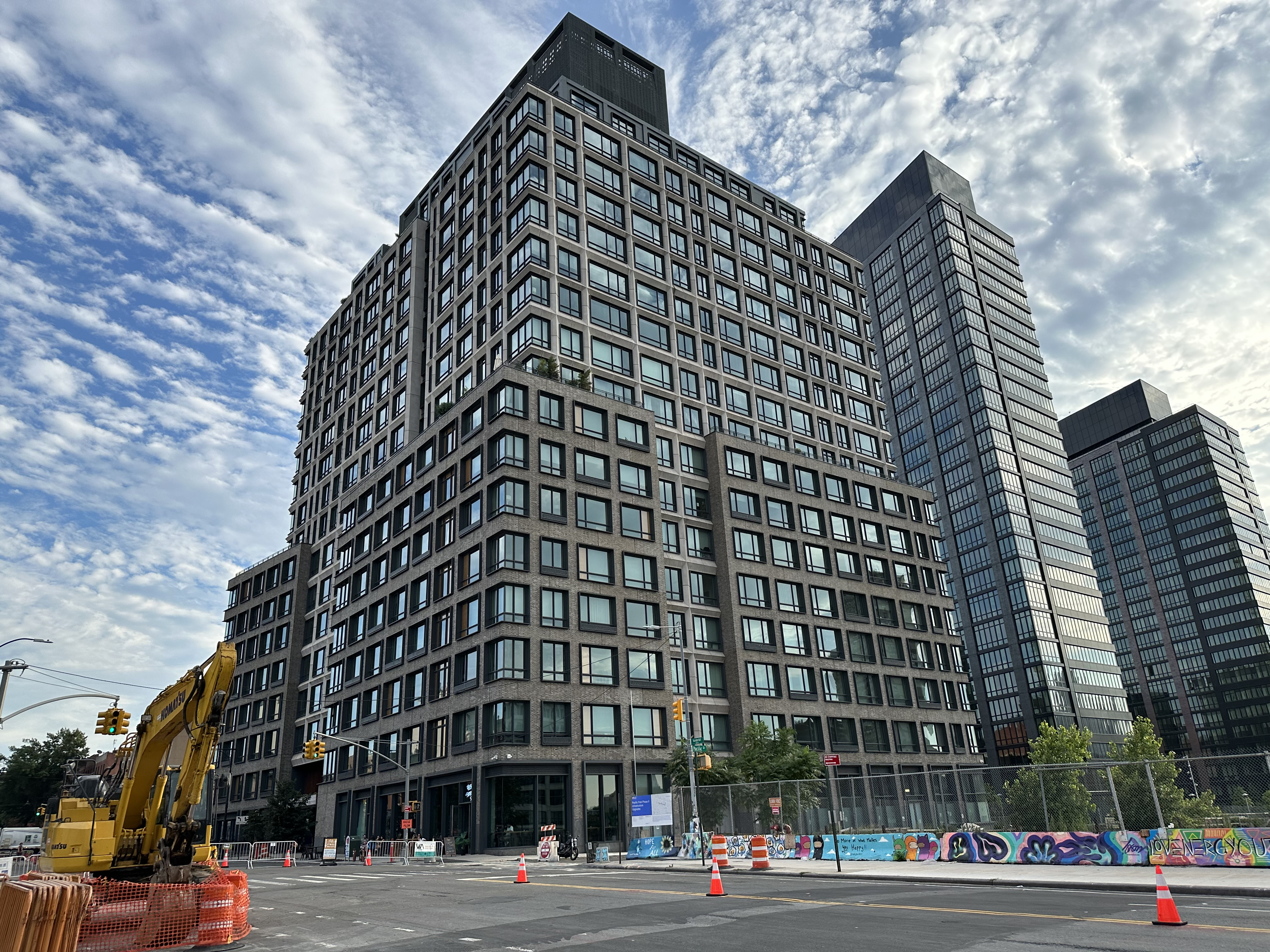
550 Vanderbilt Avenue in 2023

Plans for Atlantic Yards were announced on December 10, 2003. Its name, devised by developer Forest City Ratner, relates to the rail yard located between Atlantic Avenue and Pacific Street. At the time, the development was to include 2,250 residences and some commercial space on Pacific Street from Vanderbilt to Fourth avenues. There were also plans for a 20,000-seat arena for the New Jersey Nets. Officially, the Long Island Rail Road yard is called the "Vanderbilt Yard" by the Metropolitan Transportation Authority (MTA), named for Vanderbilt Avenue, which crosses over on its way to the Brooklyn Navy Yard. The LIRR's nearby Atlantic Terminal station is the westernmost stop of the Atlantic Branch. Easy access by rapid transit and suburban rail, and the desirable brownstone housing stock nearby made it a target for speculative development.

The Pacific Park project was originally developed and overseen by Forest City Ratner, an arm of Forest City Enterprises, of Cleveland, Ohio. The original master plan and some individual buildings were developed by architect Frank Gehry. Gehry was removed from the project in June 2009. After September 2009, the design for what became Barclays Center became a collaboration between Ellerbe Becket and the Manhattan architectural firm SHoP Architects. Pacific Park, overseen by the Empire State Development Corporation (ESDC), is supposed to be a public-private project, Bruce Ratner told Crain's New York Business in November 2009.

In March 2008, principal developer Bruce Ratner acknowledged that the slowing economy may delay construction of both the office and residential components of the project for several years. At this point, its design included the arena being surrounded by Miss Brooklyn, a Frank Gehry-designed office building and three residential buildings in its first phase. Forest City sent a letter signed by Gehry to CEOs of many of New York's biggest corporations inviting them to be tenants. The city and state had provided $58 million of the $300 million promised in public funds for the project.

On June 23, 2008, the U.S. Supreme Court refused to hear an appeal of the federal eminent domain case. The case was refiled in state court, with slightly different arguments, and in November 2009, the project cleared what the New York Times called the "final major obstacle" when the New York Court of Appeals dismissed the final challenge to the legality of eminent domain. Further challenges to the implementation of eminent domain ensued, and were dismissed in March 2010. The most prominent member of the neighborhood opposition, Daniel Goldstein, agreed under pressure to a settlement in April 2010.

=== 2010s ===
The Barclays Center, for which groundbreaking for construction occurred on March 11, 2010, was opened to the public on September 21, 2012, which was also attended by some 200 protesters. It held its first event with a Jay-Z concert on September 28, 2012.

In June 2014, Governor Andrew Cuomo announced that the Atlantic Yards complex would be completed by 2025. That August, the Atlantic Yards complex was renamed Pacific Park. In addition, plans for a new building comprising affordable units, the 298-unit, 18-story building at 535 Carlton Avenue, was unveiled, and a new 8-acre (3.2 ha) public park was also revealed. The China-based developer Greenland Holdings, along with Forest City, took over a 70 percent stake in Pacific Park in 2014. Greenland started selling 278 condos in mid-2015. The units at 550 Vanderbilt Avenue, which cost between $550,000 and $5.5 million, will be sold by Corcoran Sunshine Marketing Group. Most of the project's Phase 1 was complete by August 2016. By 2018, only four of the originally planned fifteen buildings had been completed. The developers stated that it may take until 2035 until the project was completed.

In January 2018, Forest City sold most of its remaining stake to Greenland Holdings' American subsidiary, Greenland USA, although Forest City was to retain a 5% ownership stake in the development. Forest City also sold 461 Dean Street to Principal Global Investors that March for $156 million. Subsequently, Forest City and Greenland signed an agreement to allow TF Cornerstone and the Brodsky Organization to develop three of the Pacific Park sites in August 2018. As part of the deal, Brodsky took over the lease for 664 Pacific Street. TF Cornerstone bought two sites at 615 and 595 Dean Street from Forest City and Greenland in February 2019 for $143 million, and the Brodsky Organization separately bought a fourth site that April. That month, Brodsky and Greenland Forest City began developing a structure with 859 apartments at 18 Sixth Avenue. TF Cornerstone, meanwhile, announced plans in late 2019 for 800 apartments as part of a 26-story, twin-tower complex at 615 and 595 Dean Street.

=== 2020s ===
Greenland USA and the MTA agreed in mid-2023 to construct a deck over part of Vanderbilt Yard, thereby allowing the construction of three apartment buildings above. That year, Greenland USA defaulted on two construction loans worth $349 million. The loans were related to six sites that had been planned as part of the project's second phase. Work had stalled on these six sites, prompting local community groups to protest the lack of progress. At the time, eight of the planned buildings had been completed. By mid-2024, The Related Companies—which had developed Hudson Yards in Manhattan, another project above a rail yard—had expressed interest in taking over the remaining Phase 2 sites. In August 2024, Greenland USA's lenders Fortress Investment Group and the U.S. Immigration Fund agreed to foreclose on the project, and they (along with the Related Companies) agreed to jointly take over the development.

In January 2025, the Related Companies withdrew from the Pacific Park project, and Cirrus Real Estate joined the project, partnering with the U.S. Immigration Fund. LCOR also became involved in the project. The Empire State Development Corporation was supposed to charge Greenland USA a fine of about $2,000 per month per unbuilt apartment starting in June 2025, but the ESDC postponed the fines, contingent on a new developer being selected by August 1. Even though no developer had been found by August, the state again waived the fines, due to concerns that Greenland USA would file a lawsuit over the fines. Cirrus and LCOR took over as the developers at a foreclosure auction in October, and they proposed revised plans the next month, which included increasing the project's density. Under the revised plan, the number of apartments would be increased to 2,600, with a total of 9,000 units. New York's 2026–27 state budget allocated another $175 million for Pacific Park. In June 2026, Cirrus and LCOR announced plans to spend $5 billion to complete Pacific Park, constructing six buildings with a combined 5,600 apartments. This amount included $700 million from the state government to pay for a platform over the yards.

== Elements ==
=== Land use ===
The development is sited in Prospect Heights, a gentrifying area where the median price of a residential unit exceeded $1 million in 2019. The bulk of the 22-acre (9 ha) project site was a mixture of public streets, private homes and small businesses. Forest City Ratner controls much of this private property and has benefited from the state's use of eminent domain to acquire and close the streets. The land is owned by New York State, and the developer has a 99-year lease.

The Public Authorities Control Board, which effectively ended the West Side Stadium plan, approved the state financing of the Atlantic Yards plan in December 2006.

=== Barclays Center ===
The Barclays Center is the home arena of the National Basketball Association's Brooklyn Nets which was purchased by a group led by principal developer Bruce Ratner with the intention of making it and the arena the centerpiece of the whole project. This brought major league professional sports to Brooklyn for the first time since the Brooklyn Dodgers moved to Los Angeles, California after the 1957 season. The arena's design once included an ice skating rink and a green roof. The Nets, by that time owned primarily by Russia's second richest man Mikhail Prokhorov, began playing at the Barclays Center arena in 2012. Formerly the New Jersey Nets, the Nets re-branded themselves when they moved to the Barclays Center. Prokhorov, with 80 percent ownership in the Nets at that time, became the first Russian owner of a major U.S. professional sports franchise. At the time, Ratner risked losing tax-exempt financing and the Barclays naming-rights deal if he did not break ground within three months. On September 18, 2019, Joseph Tsai, the executive vice chairman of the Alibaba Group, completed the acquisition of full ownership of the Brooklyn Nets and Barclays Center. With the closing of the transaction, Tsai became NBA Governor of the Nets and its affiliates.

=== Zoning ===
Ground was broken on the first residential building at Pacific Park—B2—on December 18, 2012. The building will have 363 units, 50% of those units will be "affordable." In March 2011, The New York Times revealed that Forest City Ratner was considering building a 34-story apartment building out of prefabricated units, making it the largest prefabricated structure in the world. The move is likely to save considerable building costs, because construction in a factory is cheaper than at a field site. While satisfying affordable housing advocates, it is likely to anger construction unions, who have been major supporters of the project. At 32 storeys tall, B2 will be the tallest building in the world constructed using modular technology. The housing component of the project has been criticized for its urban density. The construction of a 34-story prefabricated building, while not the first prefab high-rise in the city, would be the largest. However, B2 will be completed in late 2015 — more than ten years after Atlantic Yard's commencement — instead of 2014, the original expected completion date. It was only 13% complete as of April 2014.

One or two buildings in the Pacific Park project would be used for office space, though as of 2010 the office market is poor. Retail space would be built at the ground level of buildings.

== Transportation ==
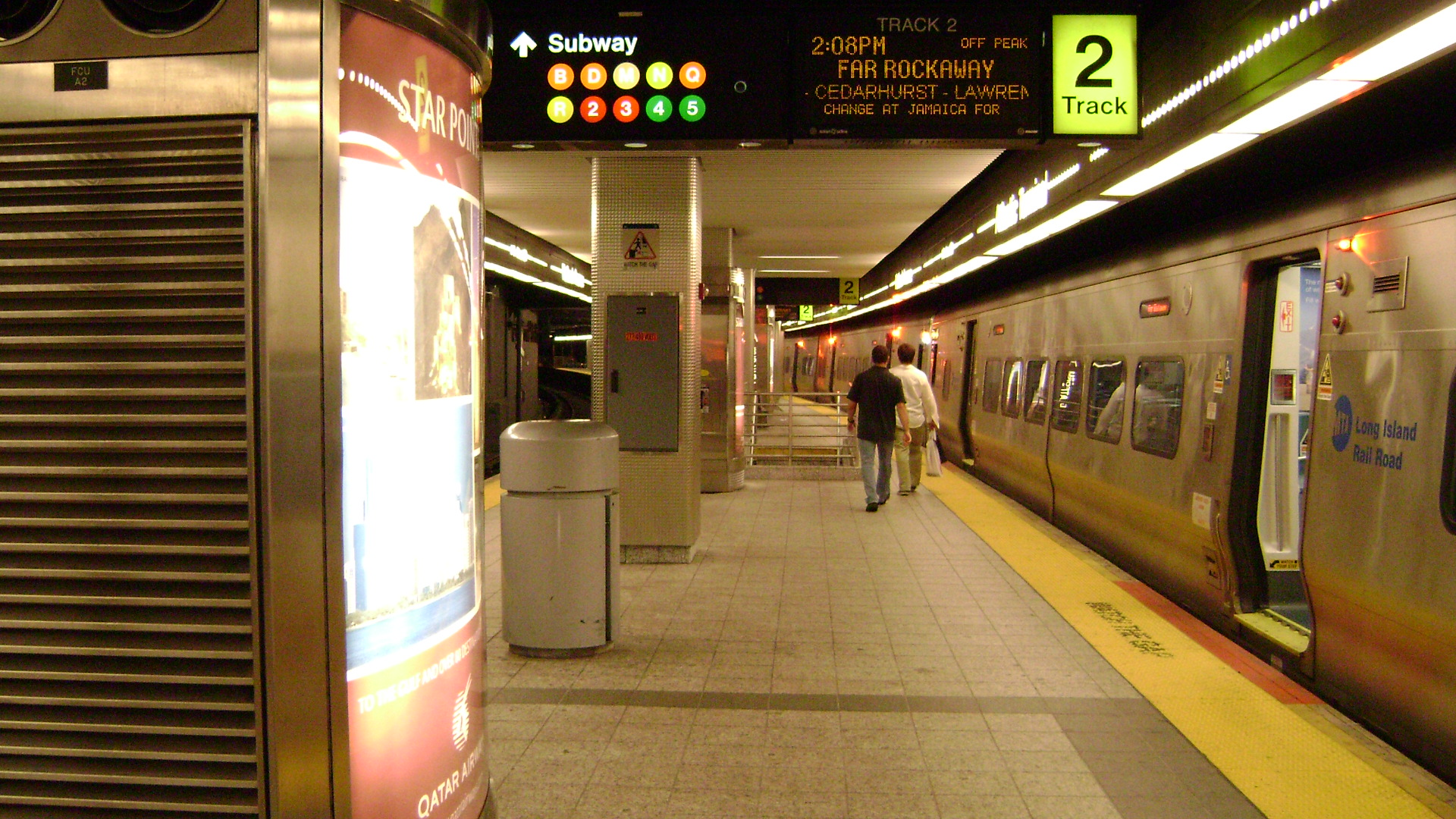
Looking down Platform B of Atlantic Terminal. LIRR train is on the right.

The project is sited above the Vanderbilt train yards belonging to the adjacent Atlantic Terminal station, after which the Atlantic Yards development was first named; this is the westernmost stop on the Long Island Rail Road (LIRR)'s Atlantic Branch. It is the primary terminal for the Far Rockaway, Hempstead, and, on weekdays, West Hempstead Branches. The location is also served by a number of bus lines.

The development sits near the intersection of Atlantic Avenue and Flatbush Avenue, one of the biggest, and the most congested, intersections in Brooklyn. The increase of car traffic to the area caused by extra housing and the construction of an arena has been frequently cited by critics as a major reason for their opposition to the project. According to the Environmental Impact Statement, the addition of more than 15,000 new residents would not significantly impact vehicular traffic, a claim contested by the Council of Brooklyn Neighborhoods. While traffic was a concern to some it has been noted that there has not been an increase in traffic associated with the arena opening while there has been a large increase in subway and Long Island Railroad use.

The Pacific Park project, at its western end, is adjacent to the Atlantic Avenue–Barclays Center station—the largest New York City Subway station in Brooklyn and among the largest transit hubs in New York City—serving the 2, 3, 4, 5, B, D, N, Q, R and W trains. The project features a new $76 million subway entrance near the front of Barclays Center. The Lafayette Avenue (A and C trains) and Fulton Street (G train) subway stations are also nearby.

== Public opinion ==
=== The Community Benefits Agreement ===
In 2005, The Brooklyn Paper revealed that Forest City had paid large sums of money to organizations, offering what they had presented as grassroots neighborhood support for the proposed Pacific Park development. Back on December 20, 2004, six months before the so-called "community benefits agreement" (CBA) was drafted, a non-governmental pact between the developer and community groups, the 501(c)(3) filings of Brooklyn United for Innovative Local Development (BUILD) stated it would receive $5 million from Bruce Ratner's company in exchange for support. A Community Benefit Agreement, that claimed to be modeled on the first of its kind for the Staples Center in Los Angeles, was signed in June 2005 between Forest City Ratner and a consortium of community groups.

=== Controversy ===
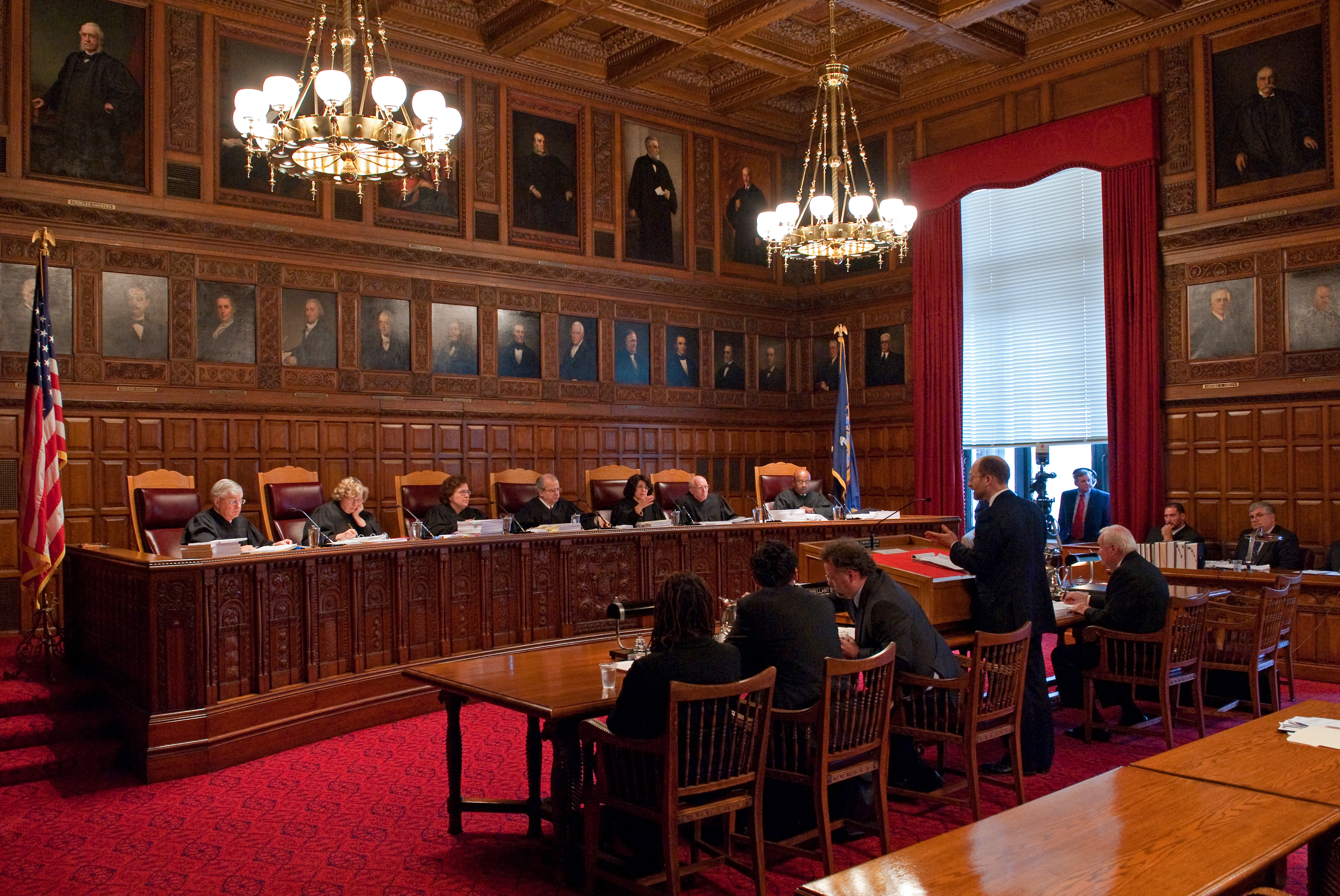
The New York Court of Appeals hearing oral arguments in Goldstein's case in 2009.

In a Huffington Post blog, Daniel Goldstein called Pacific Park, then named Atlantic Yards, "a corrupt land grab," "a taxpayer ripoff", "a bait and switch of epic proportions", and "a complete failure of democracy." Goldstein, who co-founded Develop Don't Destroy Brooklyn and was the last remaining homeowner (the condominium apartment he owned is where the arena's center court is now located) had his home taken by eminent domain by New York State on March 1, 2010, after nearly 8 years of court battles. At that time the state took sole ownership of his home and moved to evict him, his wife and toddler daughter. At his eviction hearing on April 21, 2010, Brooklyn judge Abraham Gerges forced the Empire State Development Corporation and Mr. Goldstein to settle on an imminent eviction date (May 7) and the constitutionally required just compensation for the home they had seized. The compensation was for $3 million, $760,000 of which went to Mr. Goldstein's attorney Mike Rikon.

Forest City Ratner eventually increased its bid for the site to $100 million. Forest City Ratner offered the condo owners in 636 Pacific St. $850/sq. foot, the condo owners at 24 Sixth Ave (Spalding Buildings) $650/sq. foot and undisclosed amounts to renters. Sellers of condos signed a nondisclosure agreement, termed a "gag order" by opponents.

=== Further opposition ===
The most vocal opposition group was a nonprofit named Develop Don't Destroy Brooklyn, though other organizations are opposed to or seek to scale back the project. These organizations include: 100 Blacks in Law Enforcement, Boerum Hill Association (BHA), Central Brooklyn Independent Democrats (CBID), Committee For Environmentally Sound Development, Creative Industries Coalition (80 local businesses, galleries and collectives), Democracy for New York City (DFNYC). Other neighborhood organizations that are critical of the project are gathered under the banner of 'BrooklynSpeaks', which initially eschewed a litigation strategy but in 2009 finally went to court, in a case combined with one filed by Develop Don't Destroy Brooklyn charging that the Empire State Development Corporation (ESDC) failed to consider the impact of an additional fifteen years of construction on the surrounding neighborhood when it approved a renegotiated project plan in September 2009. In November 2010, New York State Supreme Court Judge Marcy Friedman ruled in favor of the petitioners, ordering the ESDC to either provide a justification for its continued use of the original ten-year construction schedule, or otherwise conduct a supplemental environmental impact study. BrooklynSpeaks and DDDB subsequently sought a stay of construction in advance of ESDC's response to the Court order.

In addition to these and a variety of well-established community groups in the area, the development has been opposed by now-New York Attorney General Letitia James, formerly the New York City Council member for the district. Critics point to the lack of transparency of the project, the lack of democratic review of the process, mixed successes of Ratner's previous projects, the use of eminent domain to remove residents for a commercial interest. Under the project, 68 residential or business properties were to be seized and razed; it would also cause increased traffic congestion, light pollution, gentrification, and crowding.

Cory Booker, then mayor of Newark, campaigned for the New Jersey Nets to abandon plans to play at Pacific Park, and instead relocate permanently to the Prudential Center in downtown Newark, already home to the New Jersey Devils and Seton Hall Pirates; however, he later embraced the team's interim move to Newark, from fall 2010 to 2012.

On February 14, 2006, New York State Supreme Court Justice Carol Edmead ruled in favor of the dismissal of attorney David Paget as the ESDC's outside counsel. Paget, who has been advising the ESDC in its environmental review of the Atlantic Yards project, had previously also worked for FCR companies until October 2005. Justice Edmead concluded that the appointment of Paget to the ESDC represented a conflict of interest, calling it "a severe, crippling appearance of impropriety." Furthermore, Justice Edmead gave the ESDC 45 days to find a new attorney to meet the standard of "objective public interest." On May 30, 2006, the Appellate Division, First Department, reversed Justice Edmead's the decision. "The motion court misapprehended material facts and misapplied the applicable law in granting the petition to the extent of disqualifying Paget and his law firm from representing ESDC," Justice Milton Williams wrote for a unanimous panel.

The 2007 documentary film Brooklyn Matters was one of several which took a critical look at the development project.

==== Environmental impact ====
An issue concerning wastewater management was brought up during a preliminary environmental impact assessment of the project, catching the attention of Carroll Gardens residents. According to The Brooklyn Paper, the sewage generated by the development would flow into the city's antiquated combined sewer, which overloads during large rain storms. Allegedly 27 billion US gallons (100,000,000 m^{3}) of untreated sewage would drain into waterways around the city each year, including 13 outfalls on the Gowanus Canal.

==== Lawsuit by community groups ====
In late October 2006 the above-mentioned community groups filed a lawsuit in federal court against Bloomberg, Governor George Pataki, and Ratner of Forest City Ratner to stop the project. The plaintiffs are charging that the project would not serve public use, and that this is required by legal precedent. The suit, Goldstein v. Pataki, is being led by Matthew Brinkerhoff.

The lawsuit was prompted by an open letter to the Village Voice, which appeared on the nolandgrab.org website. This letter stated that Justice Kennedy's Kelo concurring opinion could be used to attack eminent domain as a violation of minimum scrutiny, which says that government policy (including an eminent domain use) must be rationally related to a legitimate government purpose.

=== Support ===
The project was endorsed by then-mayor Michael Bloomberg, as well as then-Brooklyn Borough President Marty Markowitz. The project has received the approval of the Empire State Development Corporation. The most fervent public support had come from Markowitz, who saw the project as the opportunity to bring professional sports back to Brooklyn. U.S. Senator Charles Schumer, Congressman Gregory W. Meeks, former Congressmen Edolphus Towns and Anthony Weiner, former State Senator Carl Kruger, and former Comptroller William C. Thompson, Jr. have also supported the project.

At least 30% of the project's units are reserved for low-, moderate- or middle-income tenants, so some people advocating affordable housing also supported the project. One of the more prominent members of this group was ACORN, which signed the Affordable Housing Memorandum of Understanding with Forest City Ratner in 2005.

Construction workers have been another group of strong supporters for the project. Anchor of Fox's Good Day New York, Rosanna Scotto, a native of the Dyker Heights section of Brooklyn, is also a supporter.

== See also ==
- Atlantic Terminal Mall
- Forest City Enterprises
- Hudson Yards (development), a redevelopment project in Manhattan also over a LIRR yard
- MetroTech Center
- Ward Baking Company Building
