= Stukeley =

Stukeley is a surname. Notable people with the surname include:

- William Stukeley
- Thomas Stukley (alternate spelling)
