= Center Against Domestic Violence =

The Center Against Domestic Violence is an American not-for-profit organization dedicated to preventing violence in the family and promoting the well-being and economic independence of women and children. It provides safe shelters, a network of supportive services, advocacy, education and resource information, and coalition building.

The Center is based in Brooklyn, New York and provides services in the New York City Metro area. It was formerly known as the Center for the Elimination of Violence in the Family, Inc.

== History ==
The Center Against Domestic Violence opened the first publicly funded domestic violence shelter in New York State in 1977. The New York City-based effort was spearheaded by lawyers, civil servants, and activists who understood domestic abuse as a crime and violation of human rights, not merely a private family matter.

The Center's Women's Survival Space, a place where abused women and their children could find safety, was the first of its kind in the State and is now the longest operating domestic violence shelter in New York State. Today, the Center houses up to 1,000 women and children each year in three emergency domestic violence shelters. In the 1990s, the Center saw an opportunity to prevent domestic abuse by reaching out to high school students and developed the PEER curriculum (Pride Education Equality Respect). The Center built programs to offer lifesaving teen relationship prevention programs to high school and middle school students in New York City, as well as opportunities to reach out to elementary school students with tools for building healthy relationships.

== Emergency shelters ==
The Center operates three shelters: Women's Survival Space, Women's Safe Start, and Women's Second Start. The shelters provide a safe place for survivors and their children, and offer services to assist them as they work through the trauma of domestic violence. The Center provides housing, support and a chance to build a life free of abuse for more than 1,000 women and children each year. Some services include:

- Counseling
- Case Management
- Workshops and Support Groups
- Housing Search Assistance
- Daycare
- Recreation, Educational, and After School Activities

== School-based date violence prevention ==
In 1998, the Center became the first and largest provider of teen dating violence prevention services in New York City. Combined, they reach more than 30,000 students and 5,000 school staff each year through extensive teen dating violence prevention workshops, training and support for school personnel and students.

The Relationship Abuse Prevention Program (RAPP) places Center Against Domestic Violence social workers in twelve New York City public high schools and intermediate schools. Each participating high school has a dedicated social worker who coordinates the program. Social workers provide counseling to students on a wide variety of subjects related to teen abuse, including:

- leaving abusive relationships
- helping friends who are in abusive relationships
- dealing with trauma from having witnessed violence in the family
- reporting crimes
- obtaining orders of protection
- building confidence and self esteem
- preventing domestic violence in the community.

The Center has also partnered with the Bank Street College of Education’s Center for Emotionally Responsive Practice to develop a preventive healthy relationship curriculum for elementary school students.

== Crime victims services ==
New York State's Crime Victims Board provides compensation to innocent victims for losses they incurred as a result of a crime. All domestic violence victims are, by definition, crime victims, and many need financial help to recover health or property destroyed by abusers.

=== Support and Education ===
Bilingual (English and Spanish) case managers coordinate services, educate the community about crime victim benefits and provide counseling to survivors of domestic violence. Services include:

- English and Spanish support groups
- Children's support groups
- Criminal justice support and advocacy
- Emergency assistance
- Personal advocacy
- Home or hospital visits

== Events ==
The Center's annual Standing Up Against Domestic Violence Gala is its primary fundraising event. The Center is a recipient of the Elly Grant, awarded by the New York Women's Agenda at their annual breakfast.
