= Ebbets Field =

Former stadium in Brooklyn, New York

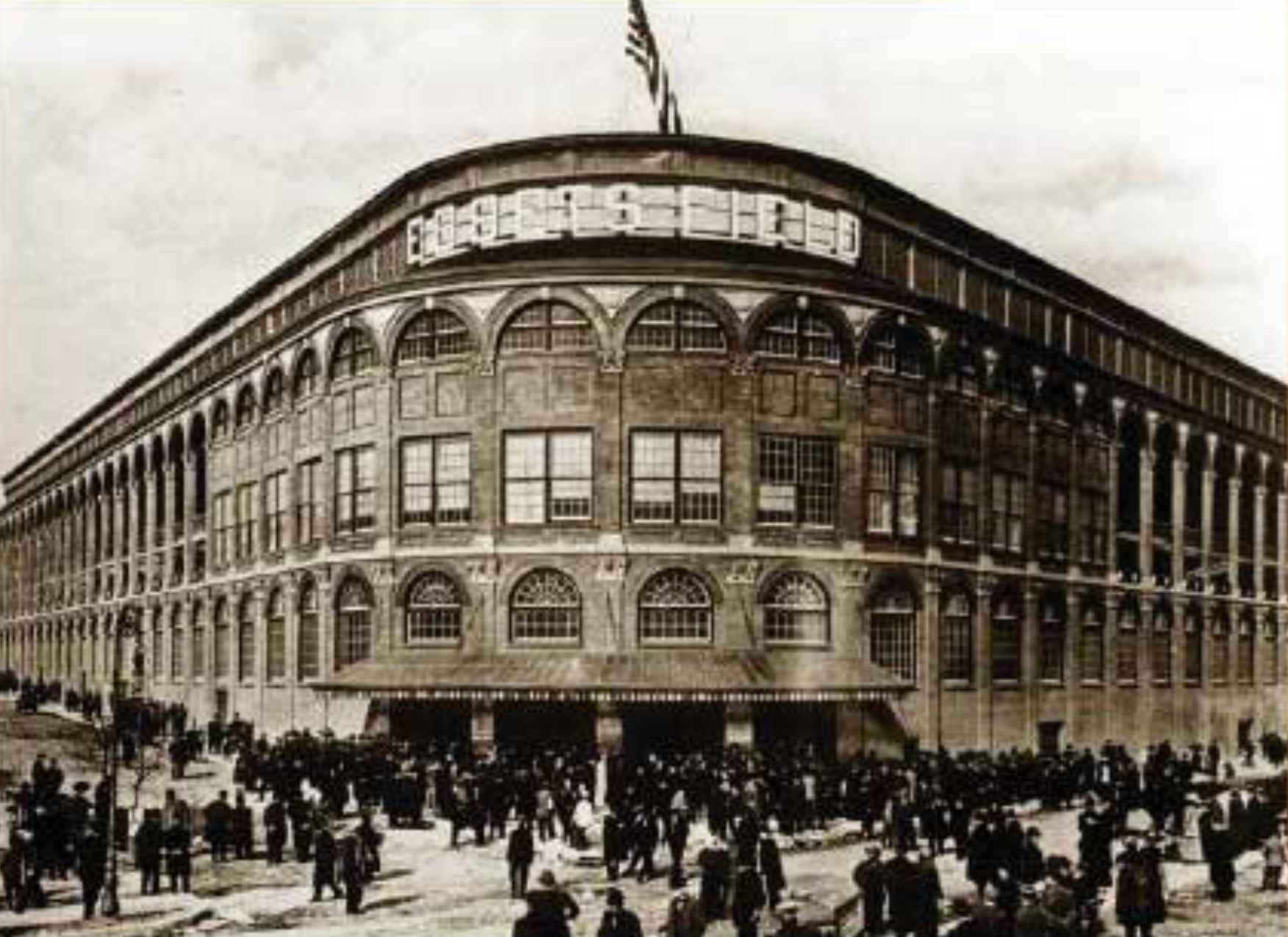

- Location within New York City Location within New York
- Location: 55 Sullivan Place; Brooklyn, New York
- Coordinates: 40°39′54″N 73°57′29″W
- Owner: Brooklyn Dodgers (1913–1956); Marvin Kratter (1956–1957)
- Operator: Brooklyn Dodgers
- Capacity: 18,000 (1913); 30,000 (1914–1923); 26,000 (1924–1925); 28,000 (1926–1931); 32,000 (1932–1936); 35,000 (1937–1945); 34,219 (1946–1949); 32,111 (1949–1954); 31,902 (1955–1957)
- Surface: Natural grass
- Field size: Left field: 348 ft Left-center: 351 ft Center field: 399 ft Right-center: 344 ft Right field: 297 ft

Construction
- Groundbreaking: March 4, 1912
- Opened: April 9, 1913
- Closed: January 1958
- Demolished: February 23, 1960
- Cost: US$750,000 ($24.4 million in 2025 dollars)
- Architect: Clarence Randall Van Buskirk
- General contractors: Castle Brothers, Inc.

Tenants
- Brooklyn Dodgers (MLB) 1913–1957; New York Brickley Giants (NFL) 1921; Brooklyn Lions (NFL) 1926; Brooklyn Dodgers / Tigers (NFL) 1930–1944; Brooklyn Tigers (AFL) 1936; LIU Football (NCAA) 1939-1940; Brooklyn Dodgers (AAFC) 1946–1948; Brooklyn Eagles (NLB) 1935

Ebbets Field was a Major League Baseball stadium in the Flatbush section of Brooklyn, New York City. It is mainly known for having been the home of the Brooklyn Dodgers baseball team of the National League (1913–1957). It was also home to Negro league baseball's Brooklyn Eagles of the Negro National League II and to six gridiron football teams, five of which were professional and one collegiate. The professional football teams were three National Football League (NFL) teams (1921–1948), one American Football League team, and one All-America Football Conference team (1946–1948); Long Island University's football team (whose nickname was the "Blackbirds" at the time) used Ebbets Field in 1939 and 1940. The stadium was demolished in 1960 and replaced by the Ebbets Field Apartments, the site's current occupant. It was located east of the Brooklyn Botanic Garden and Washington Avenue, north of Empire Boulevard, west of Bedford Avenue.

== History ==
=== Construction ===
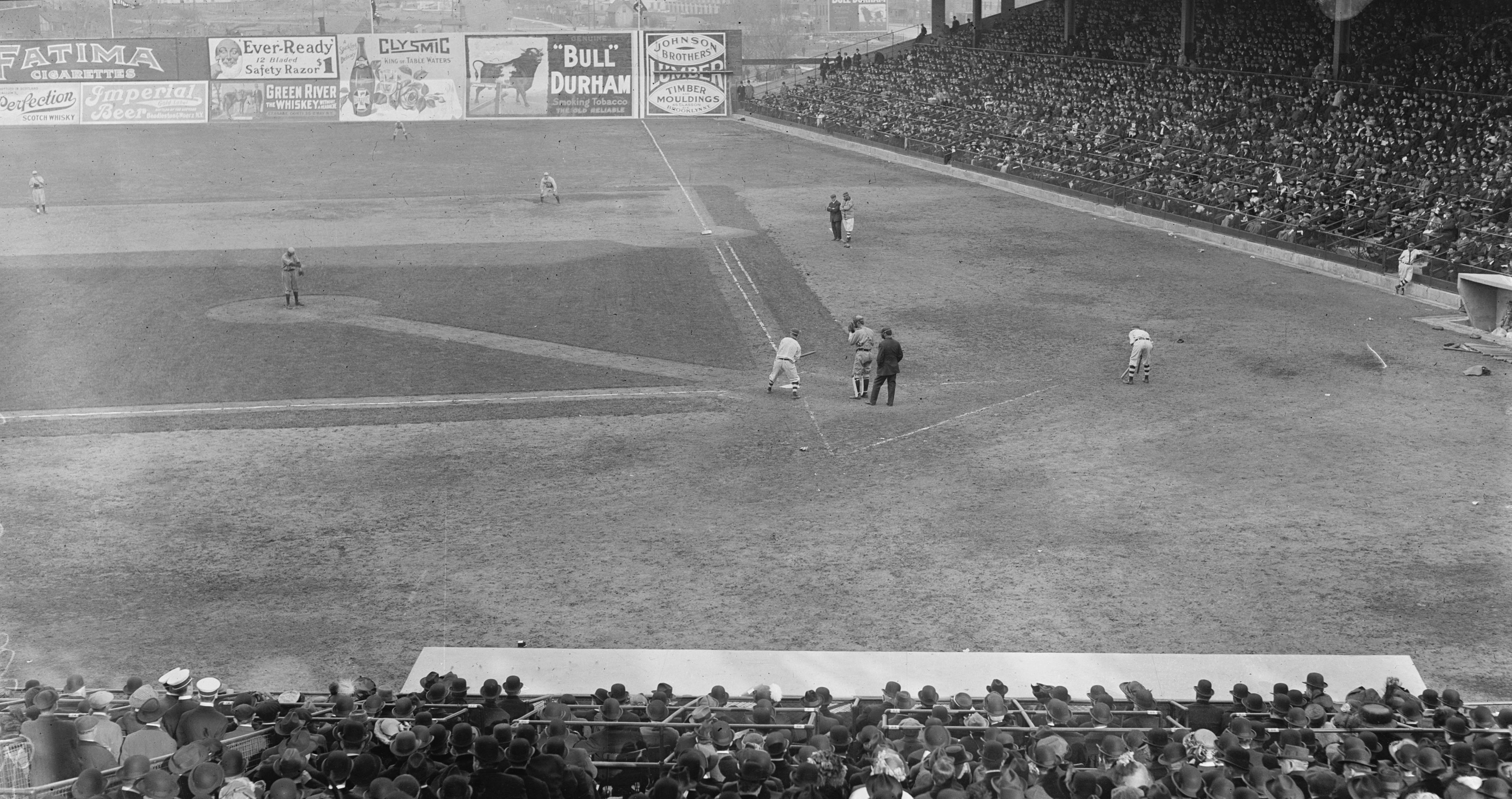
Ray Caldwell pitching in the first exhibition game at Ebbets Field, April 5, 1913: The dirt walkway visible between the mound and the plate disappeared after the 1910s.

After locating the prospective new site to build a permanent stadium to replace the old wooden Washington Park, Dodgers' owner Charles Ebbets acquired the property over several years, starting in 1908, by buying lots until he owned the entire block. Ebbets Field was bounded by Bedford Avenue to the east, Sullivan Place to the south, Cedar Street (renamed McKeever Place in 1932) to the west, and Montgomery Street to the north.

The land included the site of a garbage dump called Pigtown, so named because of the pigs that once ate their fill there and the stench that filled the air. At the groundbreaking, the site was described as containing several old houses, shanties, goats, and tomato cans, and although the streets bordering the field were mapped, two of them had not been built yet.

Construction began on March 4, 1912. The cornerstone, a piece of Connecticut granite that held newspapers, pictures of baseball players, cards, telegrams, and almanacs, was laid on July 6, 1912. At the laying ceremony, Ebbets said that the ballpark was going to be ready for play on September 1, and that Brooklyn was going to win the National League pennant in 1913.

Neither of Ebbets' predictions was correct; on August 29, 1912, as the deadline drew near and due to an ironworker's strike, the ballpark obviously was not even close to being finished, Ebbets announced that he had sold a 50% interest in the team to brothers Stephen W. and Edward J. McKeever, who had built their fortune in contracting and were able to speed along the construction. Though the sale led to management troubles years later, by early 1913, Ebbets Field was ready, and would become the home of some of baseball's greatest dramas.

Newspaper coverage in the spring of 1913 was filled with glowing praise about the new park, calling it "A Monument to the National Game" and predicting it could last 200 years: in the end, it only lasted 47 years, failing to survive the exit of the Dodgers for Los Angeles in 1958.

=== Opening ===
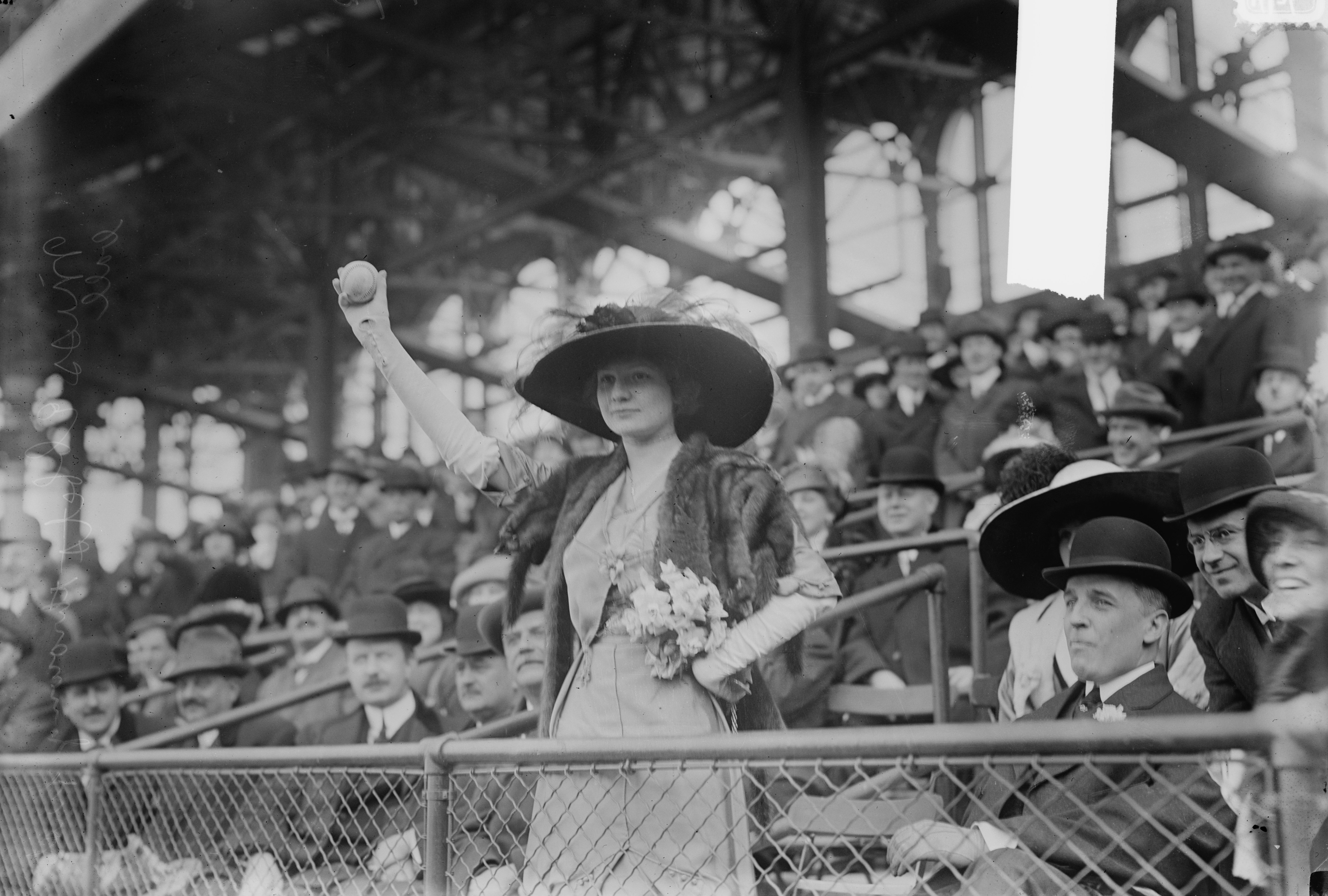
Charles Ebbets' daughter throws out the first pitch, at an exhibition game on April 5, 1913.

The first game played was an interleague exhibition game against the New York Yankees on April 5, 1913, played before an overcapacity of 30,000 fans, with 5,000 more who had arrived but were not able to get in. After a loss against the Yankees in another exhibition game on April 7 in front of about 1,000 fans on a very cold day, the first regular-season game was played on April 9 against the Philadelphia Phillies, with Brooklyn losing, 1–0.

When the park was opened, an American flag, keys to the bleachers, and a press box had all been forgotten. The press box level was not added until 1929. The original double-decked seating covered all of right field, rounded home plate, and extended past third base, with an open concrete bleacher stand continuing to the left-field wall.

The ballpark was built on a sloping piece of ground, raised above street level in right field, which resulted in short foul line there of just 301 feet (92 m)). When it opened, the field was very large for its time in both left field (419 feet (128 m)) and center (508 feet (155 m)); with additional seating, the playing field shrunk to 356 feet (109 m) in left, 406 feet (124 m) in center, and 297 feet (91 m) to right, which gained a screen above its fence and a scoreboard. At its peak, it had a capacity around 32,000.

As with Boston's Fenway Park and Detroit's Tiger Stadium, two ballparks that had opened one year earlier than Ebbets Field, the intimate configuration of some of each park's dimensions prompted some baseball writers to also refer to Ebbets Field as a "cigar box" or a "bandbox".

=== Use ===
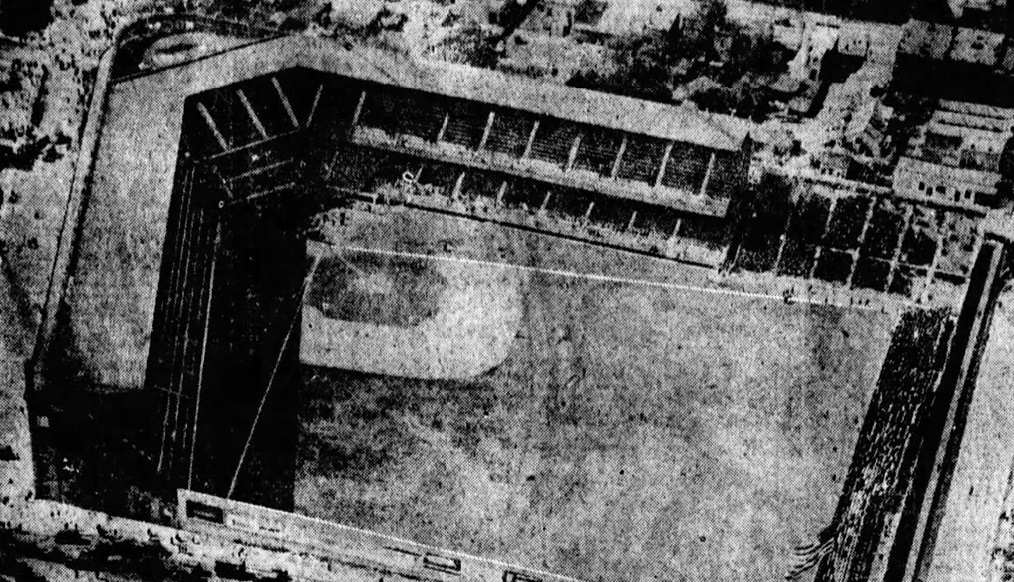
Game 1, 1920 World Series

Ebbets Field was the scene of some early successes, as the Dodgers, also called the "Robins" after long-time manager Wilbert Robinson, won National League championships in 1916 and 1920. The seating area was expanded in the 1920s, a boom time for baseball when many ballparks were expanded. The double deck was extended from third base around the left field corner, across left field, and into center field, allowing right-hand hitters to garner many more home runs. By the 1940s, a big scoreboard had been installed in right field, as well as a screen atop the high wall, which made home runs to right field a tougher accomplishment. Additional rows of seating across left field reduced that area by about 15 feet, aiding right-handed hitters.

The park's first night game was played on June 15, 1938, drawing a crowd of 38,748. Johnny Vander Meer of the visiting Cincinnati Reds pitched his second consecutive no-hitter, a feat that has never been duplicated in Major League Baseball (MLB). Also in 1938, Hilda Chester, one of the earlier sports "superfans", became a regular attendee when promotional wizard Larry MacPhail brought Ladies' Days to Ebbets Field, welcoming women for only 10 cents.

After the Dodgers early successes, the team slid into hard times. It remained there for two decades, until new ownership first brought in MacPhail in 1938, and then, after MacPhail's wartime deployment, Branch Rickey in 1943. In addition to his well-known breaking of the color line by signing Jackie Robinson in late 1945, Rickey's savvy with farm systems (which he had honed with the rival St. Louis Cardinals) produced results that made the Brooklyn Dodger "Bums" a perennial contender through their exit to California after the 1957 season.

The Dodgers won pennants in 1941 (under MacPhail), 1947, 1949, 1952, 1953, 1955, and 1956. They won the 1955 World Series, their only world title, and were within two games (in 1950) and a playoff heartbreak (in 1951) of winning five National League pennants in a row (1949–53), challenging the five-time World Champion cross-town Yankees during that stretch. Ebbets Field also hosted the 1949 MLB All-Star game.

=== Demise ===
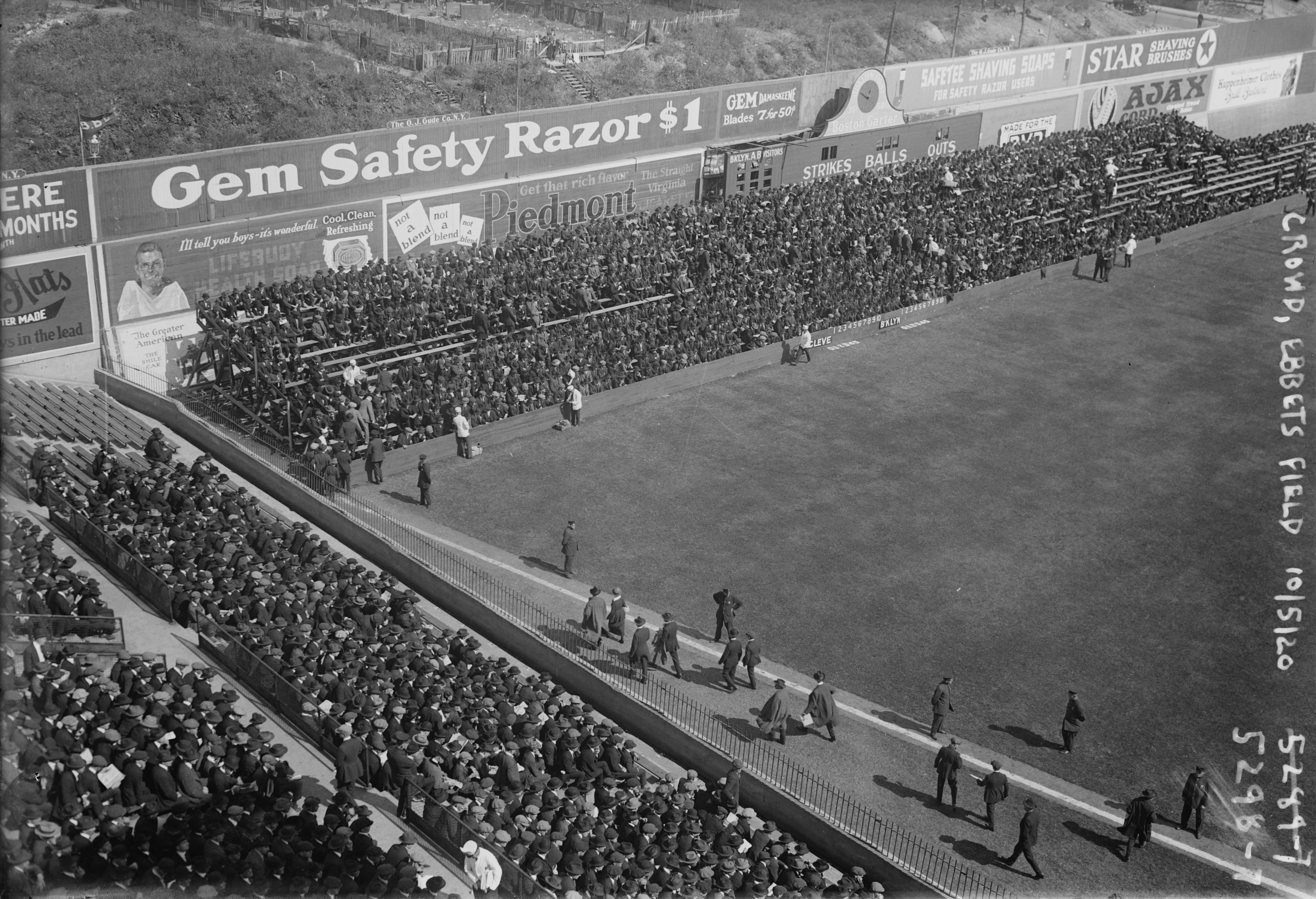
Ebbets left-field corner in the 1920 World Series, with temporary bleachers

The Dodgers found themselves victims of their own success soon thereafter, as Ebbets Field never seated more than 35,000 people, and the constraints of the neighborhood made its expansion impossible. It also had almost no automobile parking for Dodger fans who had moved east to suburban Long Island, though it was near a subway station. Walter O'Malley, who obtained majority ownership of the Dodgers in 1950, announced plans for a privately owned domed stadium at the Atlantic Yards in Brooklyn (currently the site of the Atlantic Terminal Mall), where a large market was being torn down.

New York City Building Commissioner Robert Moses refused to help O'Malley secure the land, instead wanting the Dodgers to move to a city-owned stadium in Flushing Meadows in the borough of Queens (the future site of Shea Stadium and Citi Field). O'Malley refused to consider Moses' proposal, famously telling him, "We are the Brooklyn Dodgers, not the Queens Dodgers!"

As a result, O'Malley began to flirt publicly with Los Angeles, using a relocation threat as political leverage to win favor for a Brooklyn stadium. Ultimately, O'Malley and Moses could not come to agreement on a new location for the stadium, and the club moved west to Los Angeles after the 1957 season. During their last two years in Brooklyn, the Dodgers played several games each year in Jersey City, New Jersey's Roosevelt Stadium, which was a tactic by O'Malley to force Moses to acquiesce and allow a new stadium to be built.

Ebbets Field was sold by O'Malley to real estate developer Marvin Kratter for about $2,000,000 on October 31, 1956. The deal included a five-year lease that allowed the Dodgers to move out as soon as a proposed Downtown Brooklyn stadium was ready for business and Kratter to raze the ballpark and redevelop the land for a $25 million housing project beginning in 1961. When stadium plans fell through the team left for Los Angeles after the 1957 season.

To avoid being the only team west of St. Louis, O'Malley urged Horace Stoneham, owner of the Dodgers' long-time crosstown rivals, the New York Giants, to also move west. Stoneham, who was having stadium and financial difficulties of his own, agreed, and moved the Giants to San Francisco after the 1957 season.

The departure of the Dodgers was followed by a "twilight" phase in which the park sporadically hosted soccer, as well as high school, college, and a handful of Negro league baseball games featuring a team formed by ex-Dodger star Roy Campanella. In one of those games, pitcher Satchel Paige made a special guest appearance.

The demolition of Ebbets Field began on February 23, 1960. More than 35 years after the Dodgers had left Brooklyn, a federal judge in the Southern District of New York presiding over a case deciding the use of the Brooklyn Dodgers' trademark called O'Malley's relocation of the franchise from its historic home to Los Angeles "one of the most notorious abandonments in the history of sports".

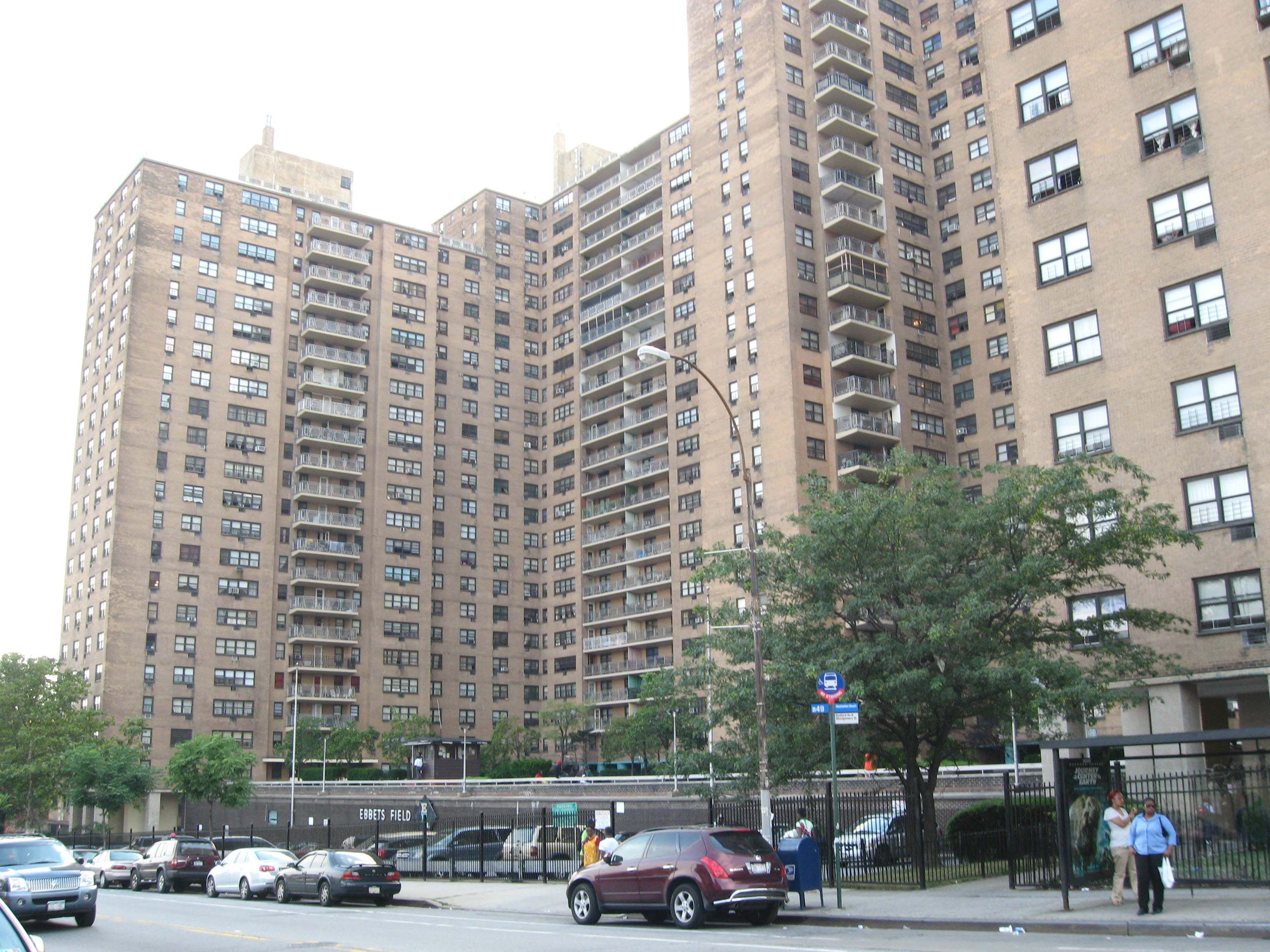
Ebbets Field Apartments in 2008

An auction of Ebbets Field's structure and contents was held on April 20, 1960. An estimated 500 people bid on locker-room stools, benches, team banners, seats, bricks, bats, caps, team photos, balls, and a brownstone cornerstone of the stadium.

=== In subsequent years ===
The Ebbets Field Apartments were built on the former ballpark site, opening in 1962, and remaining under private ownership. Middle School 320, across McKeever Place, was renamed Jackie Robinson Intermediate School. In January 2014, the street sign that once stood at the corner of McKeever Place and Montgomery Street was sold at auction for $58,852.08.

== Legacy ==
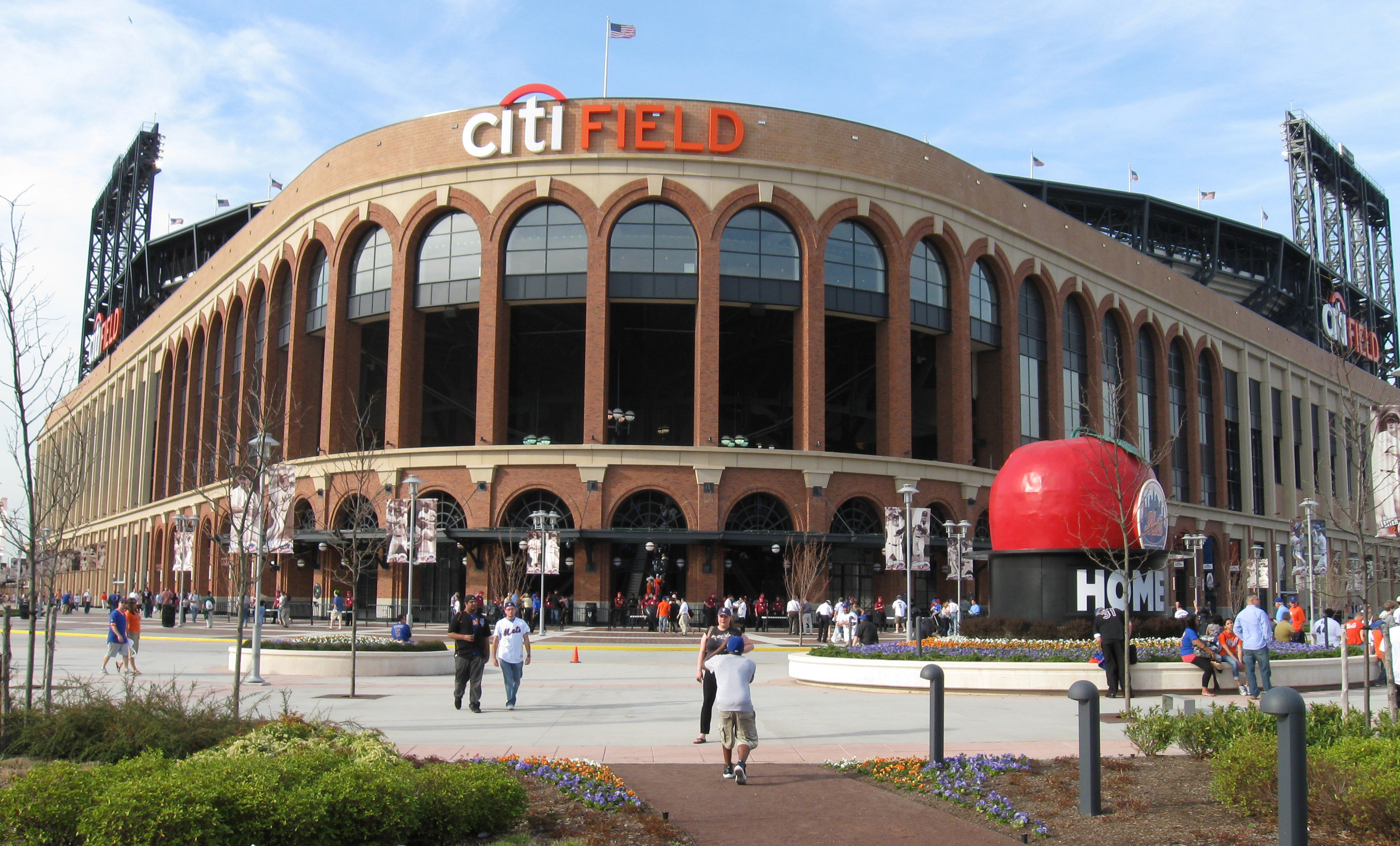
Citi Field's exterior facade is influenced by Ebbets Field

Ebbets Field was one of several historic MLB ballparks demolished in the 1960s. Of the many teams that uprooted in the 1950s and 1960s, the Dodgers' legacy perhaps has lingered the longest. Roger Kahn's acclaimed book The Boys of Summer and Frank Sinatra's song "There Used to Be a Ballpark" mourned the loss of places such as Ebbets Field and their time.

The story of Ebbets Field and the Brooklyn Dodgers' move to Los Angeles were further chronicled by historian Doris Kearns Goodwin, figured into the plot of the film Field of Dreams, were featured in an entire episode of Ken Burns' acclaimed public-television documentary Baseball, as well as a 2007 HBO documentary called Brooklyn Dodgers: Ghosts of Flatbush.

By 2006, the Dodgers had played as many years in Dodger Stadium as they had at Ebbets Field, matched by the New York Mets' duration in Shea Stadium from 1964 to 2008.

When the New Jersey Nets of the National Basketball Association moved to Brooklyn in 2012, marking a return of major-league professional sports to the borough after a 55-year absence, they installed the Ebbets Field flagpole in front of their home arena, Barclays Center.

=== Other sports at Ebbets Field ===
Ebbets Field was frequently used for collegiate football match-ups and was home base for Manhattan College's team in the 1930s. It also hosted three professional football teams – the New York Brickley Giants for one game in 1921, the Brooklyn Lions/Horsemen in 1926, and the Brooklyn Dodgers/Tigers from 1930 to 1944.

In 1927, the soccer Club Nacional de Football in its North American tour played two games against Brooklyn Wanderers, winning both. The Nacionales fielded Olympic medal winners such as José Andrade and Héctor Scarone.

The stadium also hosted numerous soccer games, including the U.S. National Challenge Cup soccer tournament, now known as the Lamar Hunt U.S. Open Cup. Bethlehem Steel F.C. from Pennsylvania of the American Soccer League won its sixth and final National Challenge Cup title, on April 11, 1926, scoring a convincing 7–2 victory over Ben Miller F.C. of St. Louis in the final before more than 18,000 fans.

On June 7, 1931, over 10,000 fans came out to Ebbets Field to watch Celtic of Scotland defeat the Brooklyn Wanderers 5–0.

On June 17, 1947, the first known televised soccer game in the US took place when Hapoel Tel Aviv lost to the American League Stars 2–0. On June 18, 1948, Liverpool of England beat Djurgården of Sweden 3–2 in front of 20,000 fans. On October 17 of that year, the U.S. national team beat the Israel national team in front of 25,000 fans. On May 8, 1955, Sunderland of England beat the American League Stars 7–2. On May 17, Sunderland drew 1-1 with 1. FC Nürnberg of Germany.

On May 25, 1958, Manchester City of England lost to Hearts of Scotland 6–5 in front of more than 20,000 patrons. The winners received the Empire State Cup, which can be seen in the Heart of Midlothian FC Museum. On June 28, 1959, Napoli of Italy lost to Rapid Vienna of Austria 1–0 in front of 18,512, and game officials were attacked afterwards. At the rematch three days later in front of 13,000 people, Napoli tied Rapid Vienna 1–1, in one of the last events held there.

Gaelic football was also played at Ebbets Field. On June 24, 1931, the All-Ireland champion County Kerry team defeated Kildare by a score of 18–3 with an attendance of 2,500 fans under floodlights in a night game.

Ebbets Field also hosted nearly 90 fight cards between 1915 and 1947.

== Dimensions ==
A detailed plan of the new ballpark was published in the Brooklyn Daily Eagle for January 3, 1912. The right field line was to be 298 feet (91 m) from home plate, the left-field line 401 feet (122 m), and to the front of the intended triangle-shaped center-field bleachers the plan said 407 feet (124 m) "+ or −".

When the ballpark opened in 1913, the outfield was bounded by bare concrete walls all around, which soon were covered with advertising. The triangular center field was used for the flagpole, with just a short fence in front of it, no bleachers. A large door was in deep right-center field, at the one place where the outfield and the sloping Bedford Avenue were at the same elevation. By 1920, several rows of wooden bleachers had been constructed inside the left-field wall, which the newspapers called "circus seats".

In the spring of 1931, the Dodgers began expanding Ebbets Field. They demolished the old concrete bleachers beyond third base, as well as the "circus seats". They built an extension of the main double-deck stands, which stretched across left and center fields, leaving a notch for the big door in deep right-center field. Once this work was done, the general layout was fairly well set. The left-field corner had a unique arrangement, with the foul line actually running atop the box-seat railing to the foul pole. A new door in left-center field once had a sign reading 364 1/2 feet (111.1 m). Above the street-exit door in the deep center-field notch was a sign reading 399 feet (122 m).

The last changes came in 1948, when several rows of seats were installed in front of the outfield stands, reducing the left and center dimensions to their final distances. The 399 marker above the deep center-field door was painted over, while a 376 marker was added to the right corner of the seating-area wall.

An interactive model of Ebbets Field was designed to scale by Ideum and Gensler for the Jackie Robinson Museum in 2022.

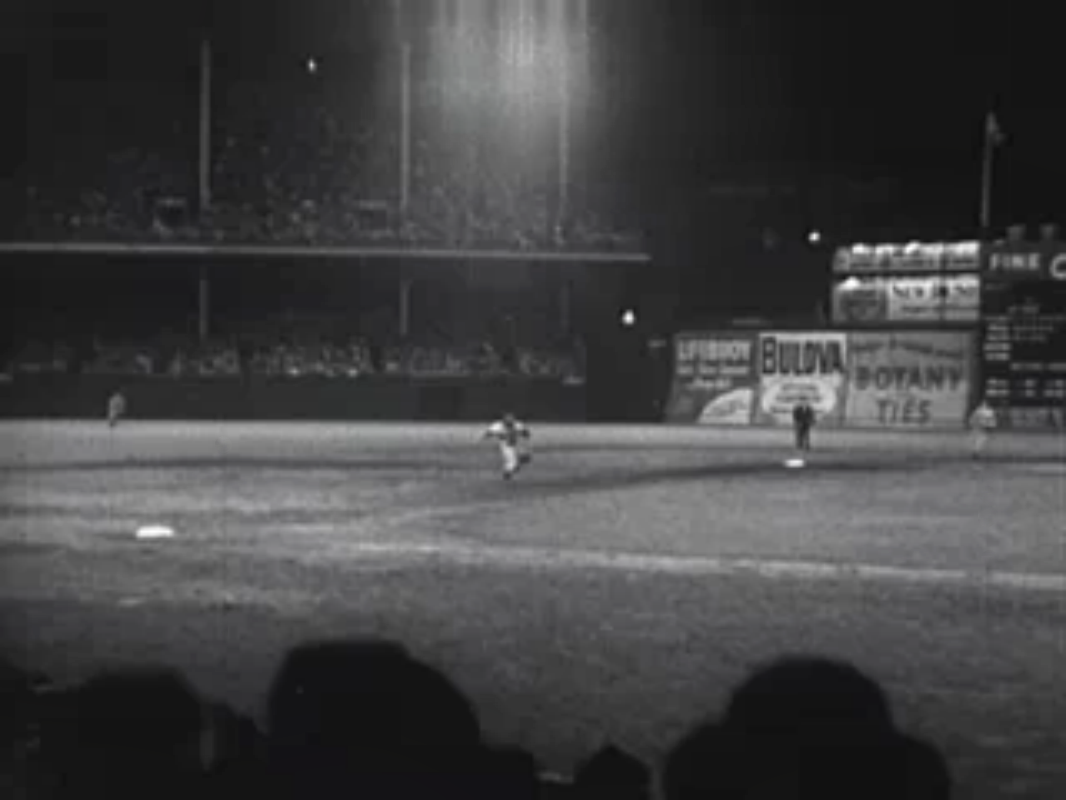
A night game at Ebbets Field between the Philadelphia Phillies and the Brooklyn Dodgers, September 24, 1949

Original (estimates)
Dimension	Distance
Left field pole	419 ft (128 m)
Center field deep	477 ft (145 m)
Right field pole	301 ft (92 m)

1931–1947
Dimension	Distance	Notes
Left field pole	348 ft (106 m)	unposted
Left field corner	357 ft (109 m)	
Left-center field	365 ft (111 m)	
Deep left-center	407 ft (124 m)	
Deep right-center bleacher corner	389 ft (119 m)	unposted
Deep right-center notch	399 ft (122 m)	
Right-center, scoreboard edges	344 ft (105 m) and 318 ft (97 m)	
Right field pole	297 ft (91 m)	

1948–1957
Dimension	Distance	
Left field pole	348 ft (106 m)	
Left-center field	351 ft (107 m)	
Deep left-center	393 ft (120 m)	
Deep right-center bleacher corner	376 ft (115 m)	
Deep right-center notch	399 ft (122 m)	unposted
Right-center, scoreboard edges	344 ft (105 m) and 318 ft (97 m)	
Right field pole	297 ft (91 m)	
Backstop	71 ft (22 m)	

Events and tenants
Preceded by Washington Park	Home of the Brooklyn Dodgers; 1913–1957	Succeeded by Los Angeles Memorial Coliseum
Preceded by Sportsman's Park	Host of the All-Star Game; 1949	Succeeded by Comiskey Park
