= Paul Pfeiffer (artist) =

American sculptor

- Born: 1966 (age 59–60); Honolulu, Hawaiʻi, U.S.
- Education: San Francisco Art Institute; Hunter College
- Known for: Sculpture photography video art
- Notable work: The Four Horsemen of the Apocalypse; The Long Count (The Rumble in the Jungle); Live From Neverland
- Awards: National Endowment for the Arts Travel Grant Pilot; Art Matters Project Grant; Fulbright-Hays Fellowship; World Trade Center Residency, Bucksbaum Award; Alpert Award in the Arts

Paul Pfeiffer (born 1966 in Honolulu, Hawaiʻi) is an American sculptor, photographer and video artist. Described by peer artist Gregory Volk as a clever manipulator of popular media, images and video technology, Pfeiffer is stated (by Volk) as one 'who excels at recasting well-known athletic and entertainment events with surprising open-ended nuances.'

== Life ==
Pfeiffer was born in Honolulu, Hawaiʻi in 1966. At the age of ten, he moved to Philippines with his parents who were classically trained musicians. He later moved out of the country at the age of fifteen. Pfeiffer earned his Bachelor of Fine Arts in printmaking from San Francisco Art Institute in 1987 and later earned his Master of Fine Arts degree from Hunter College, New York in 1994. Pfeiffer has lived and worked in New York City since 1990. Between the year of 1997 and 1998, Pfeiffer had also participated in the Whitney Museum of American Art's Independent Study Program. He is currently represented by Paula Cooper Gallery in New York City; carlier | gebauer in Berlin, Germany, Galerie Perrotin in Paris and Thomas Dane Gallery in London, UK.

== Exhibition history ==
Pfeiffer has had museum solo shows and projects at Duke University Museum of Art, Raleigh-Durham, NC (2000), the Whitney Museum of American Art, New York, NY (2001), UCLA Hammer Museum, Los Angeles, CA (2001), the Barbican Arts Centre, London, United Kingdom (2001), Kunsthaus Glarus, Glarus, Switzerland (2001), the Museum of Contemporary Art, Chicago, IL (2003), The Contemporary Museum, Honolulu, HI (2003), K 21 Kunstsammlung, Nordrhein-Westfalen, Düsseldorf, Germany (2004), Middlebury College Museum of Art, Middlebury, VT (2005), National Gallery of Victoria, Melbourne, Australia (2005), University of Iowa Museum of Art, Iowa City, IA (2007), Nationalgalerie im Hamburger Bahnhof – Museum für Gegenwart, Berlin, Germany (2009), Sammlung Goetz, Munich, Germany (2011), Blanton Museum of Art, Austin, TX (2012), Museum of Contemporary Art and Design, Malate Manila, Philippines (2015), and Performa 19, New York (2019).

Pfeiffer’s Red Green Blue was displayed at the Paula Cooper Gallery, New York City (November 12, 2022 – January 12, 2023) and Joslyn Art Museum, Omaha, Nebraska (October 11, 2025 – April 26, 2026).

Pfeiffer’s Prologue to the Story of the Birth of Freedom was displayed at The Geffen Contemporary at MOCA (November 12, 2023 – June 16, 2024), Guggenheim Bilbao (November 30, 2024 – March 16, 2025) and Museum of Contemporary Art Chicago (May 3, 2025 – August 31, 2025). Catalog ISBN 978-1-915-74333-6.

On April 2, 2026, Pfeiffer was named the inaugural artist-in-residence at the Barclays Center Arena in Brooklyn, New York. The residency will begin in May 2026 and end in spring 2027 and is part of the Arena’s “Brooklyn Art Encounters;” Pfeiffer will work with Shaun Leonardo and the Social Justice Fund “on a year-long project titled Exodus to lead media workshops with youth and adults who have been affected by the criminal-justice system."

== Awards and scholarships ==
In 1993, Pfeiffer was awarded as a Travel Grant Pilot by the National Endowment for the Arts and Arts International. In 1994, he was given the Project Grant by the Art Matters foundation. In 1994, Pfeiffer won a Fulbright-Hays Fellowship to the Philippines where he spent one year. In 1999, Pfeiffer participated in the World Trade Center Residency and was awarded the Public Art Fund. Pfeiffer was awarded the inaugural $100,000 Bucksbaum Award at the Whitney Biennial in 2000. In 2001, he was included in the 49th Venice Biennale; that same year, Pfeiffer participated in the MIT List Visual Arts Center Residency, which was jointly organized by the MIT List Visual Arts Center and the Museum of Contemporary Art, Chicago. Pfeiffer then participated in the Artpace Residency in San Antonio, TX in 2003. He was awarded The Alpert Award in the Arts, Visual Arts in 2009. In Fall 2011, Pfeiffer was a Fellow at the American Academy in Berlin. Pfeiffer was honored at the LMCC 2020 virtual celebration.

== Selected works ==
Pfeiffer's work is time-consuming and meticulous. "Pfeiffer makes a show of removing his subjectivity while investing himself intensely in his work: It can take him four months to produce a scant two minutes of video."

- The Four Horsemen of the Apocalypse (2000 - ): a series of photographic images of basketball games, from which all players except one have been edited out.
- The Long Count (The Rumble in the Jungle) (2001): a video of Muhammad Ali and George Foreman fighting, from which the fighters have been digitally removed.
- Live From Neverland (2007): a video installation, divided into two separate videos, depicting Michael Jackson's 2003 press conference, in which the icon addresses child-molestation allegations, but with the sound removed and replaced on a separate screen by 80 children reciting the King of Pop's words in the manner of a Greek chorus. Pfeiffer's deft editing alternately speeds up and slows down Jackson's tape to sync perfectly with the children's recitation.
