= Shaun Leonardo =

American artist and performer

Shaun El C. Leonardo
- Born: Queens, New York

Shaun El C. Leonardo is an American artist and performer best known for his work exploring the relationships between masculinity, sports, race, and culture.

== Early life and education ==
Shaun Leonardo was born and raised in Queens, New York. His mother is from the Dominican Republic and his father is from Guatemala. "Growing up in Queens with immigrant parents Leonardo looked to pop culture for his role-models." Leonardo attended an all boys Jesuit Highschool. He earned his BA in Visual Arts, painting from Bowdoin College in Brunswick, Maine. Leonardo played American football while at Bowdoin. He went on to receive his Masters in Fine Art in Painting from the San Francisco Art Institute in 2005.

== Art ==
Shaun Leonardo works in drawing, painting, and performance. Through his artistic practice he interrogates "hyper-masculine figures" ranging from athletes to superheroes and explores the influence they have on shaping ideas of manhood.

Leonardo's work often focuses on childhood role models, popular icons and cultural stereotypes and how they influence our perception of what it means to be a man. Leonardo often performs as hyper-masculine heroes, seeking to expose and explore vulnerability. In his paintings, on cutout plywood, he isolates the figures in an effort to amplify feelings of exclusion, isolation, and invisibility. Whether Leonardo is working in drawing, painting, sculpture or performance, his work examines the "confusion, desperation and, often times, failure we experience when attempting to either locate ourselves within our popular cultures or aspire to their unattainable ideals."

On April 2, 2026, the Barclays Center announced Leonardo would be collaborating with Paul Pfeiffer and the Social Justice Fund “on a year-long project titled Exodus to lead media workshops with youth and adults who have been affected by the criminal-justice system.”

== Performance work ==
In a series of performances from 2004 to 2007, Leonardo performed as El Conquistador or interchangeably El C., a Luchador, an alter ego, who is fighting a recurring battle with a fictional unseen opponent, The Invisible Man. His opponent's name, a reference to the title of Ralph Ellison's award-winning novel from 1952, exploring race and identity. Performed in front of live audiences, El Conquistador vs The Invisible Man explored the "struggle against physical and metaphorical invisibility in society, and with the complexities of hyper-masculine identity in Latino culture."

Shaun Leonardo's series "I Can't Breathe" began in 2015. The work came out of Leonardo's response to the death of Eric Garner and the non-indictment of the New York City Police Department officer responsible for his death. These performances are part self-defense class and part public-participatory performance. During the performance, Leonardo takes the audience through four moves: 1) How to break an arm hold; 2) how to reestablish distance if someone grabs your shirt; 3) how to block a punch; "The final maneuver is the chokehold. "The same chokehold that took Eric Garner’s life.”

In Leonardo's 2008 installation and performance piece, Bull in the Ring, he and 10 semi-pro football players performed the Bull in the Ring training routine. A training routine that was banned from American football on the high school and collegiate levels. In the routine, the team forms a revolving circle around one player, the matador, would waits in the center of the ring. In its original form, the coach randomly choose players to play the part of the bull who then charge at the player in the center, possibly catching him off-guard, to deliver a blow. Leonardo had been practicing this training routing from 12 years old. Through the Bull in the Ring performance Leonardo explores the pressures young men have to face, to conform, and to prove their toughness.

At the Brooklyn Museum, Leonardo staged a dance hall event that toyed with traditional gender roles, Taxi Dance inspired by popular nightclub events in the 1920s, where men would pay women to dance. Leonardo instead had participants pay men to dance with them.

== Recognition and honors ==
Shaun Leonardo has received grants, residencies and fellowships from the New York Foundations for the Arts, Skowhegan School of Painting and Sculpture, The New York Studio School, Lower Manhattan Cultural Council, Art Matters, McColl Center for Visual Art, and Creative Capital. Leonardo's work has been exhibited nationally and internationally. His work has been exhibited at the Brooklyn Museum of Art, LACMA, Yerba Buena Center for the Arts, The Walker Art Center, Studio Museum in Harlem, Contemporary Arts Museum Houston, and Museo de la Ciudad de Mexico. Shaun Leonardo's work has been featured in The New York Times, The Boston Globe, ArtForum, The New Yorker, Interview, The Village Voice, MoMA Ps1, and PAPERMAG

An exhibition of Leonardo's drawings of police killings of black and Latino boys and men at the Museum of Contemporary Art Cleveland was cancelled after what the museum referred to as a "troubling community response". Two weeks after issuing an apology, the director of the museum resigned.
