= Proposed domed Brooklyn Dodgers stadium =

Unbuilt stadium in New York City

- Walter O'Malley and Buckminster Fuller examine the model for the stadium in November 1955
- Interactive map of Proposed domed Brooklyn Dodgers stadium
- Coordinates: 40°41′00″N 73°58′36″W
- Owner: Brooklyn Dodgers
- Operator: Brooklyn Dodgers
- Capacity: 52,000
- Surface: grass

Construction
- Built: Never built
- Opened: Would have been opened in 1960
- Architect: Buckminster Fuller

Tenant
- Brooklyn Dodgers

The Brooklyn Sports Center, in retrospect known as the Dodger Dome, was a proposed domed stadium for the Brooklyn Dodgers, designed by Buckminster Fuller to replace Ebbets Field. Meant to keep the Dodgers in New York City, it was first announced in the early 1950s. The envisioned structure would have seated 52,000 people and would have been the first domed stadium in the world, opening roughly a decade before Houston's Astrodome. The Dodgers instead moved to Chavez Ravine in Los Angeles.

The unbuilt stadium, in Fort Greene, Brooklyn, would have been located at the northeast corner of Flatbush Avenue and Atlantic Avenue, on the site of the Atlantic Terminal. It would have cost $6 million to build and been privately financed. The general area eventually did become a sports venue, because Barclays Center was built across the street to the south from the Atlantic Terminal, in neighboring Pacific Park.

== Background ==
The Dodgers were playing at the 32,000-seat Ebbets Field. Feeling that the stadium was too small for their needs, they wanted to move to a newer, more modern facility. Dodgers owner Walter O'Malley wanted to exploit new revenue streams to capitalize on the rabid fans of the Dodgers. O'Malley commissioned Norman Bel Geddes about renovating Ebbets Field and first proposed a dome. He also talked to Buckminster Fuller to design a domed stadium.

New York City Construction Coordinator Robert Moses wanted to utilize open space in Flushing Meadows, Queens and build a city-owned stadium there for the Dodgers. This plot of land was eventually occupied by Shea Stadium and later, Citi Field, the home of the New York Mets. Moses also opposed the location of the domed stadium since it would have caused significant changes to the New York City Subway system.

The proposed stadium's failure is a source of debate today, and proved to be an important factor in the Dodgers' move from Brooklyn to Los Angeles in 1957. Some think O'Malley purposely proposed a stadium that had little chance of being built and that he privately negotiated with the city while publicly touting the merits of the domed stadium. Others suggest that the domed stadium failed because of Moses' uncompromising personality.

The Atlantic Terminal Mall now stands on the land where the stadium would have been built. Adjacent to the Atlantic Terminal, in the new Pacific Park development, is Barclays Center, where the Brooklyn Nets began play in 2012–13; they were joined by the New York Islanders from 2015 until 2020 and the New York Liberty in 2020.

The outfield wall would have been the same distance from home plate to center field as down the foul lines (380 feet to all parts of the outfield); in effect, the wall would have formed one-fourth of a true circle. (This symmetry is found in South Williamsport, Pennsylvania, on the fields where the Little League World Series is played each August.)
