= Barclays Center =

Multi-purpose indoor arena in New York City

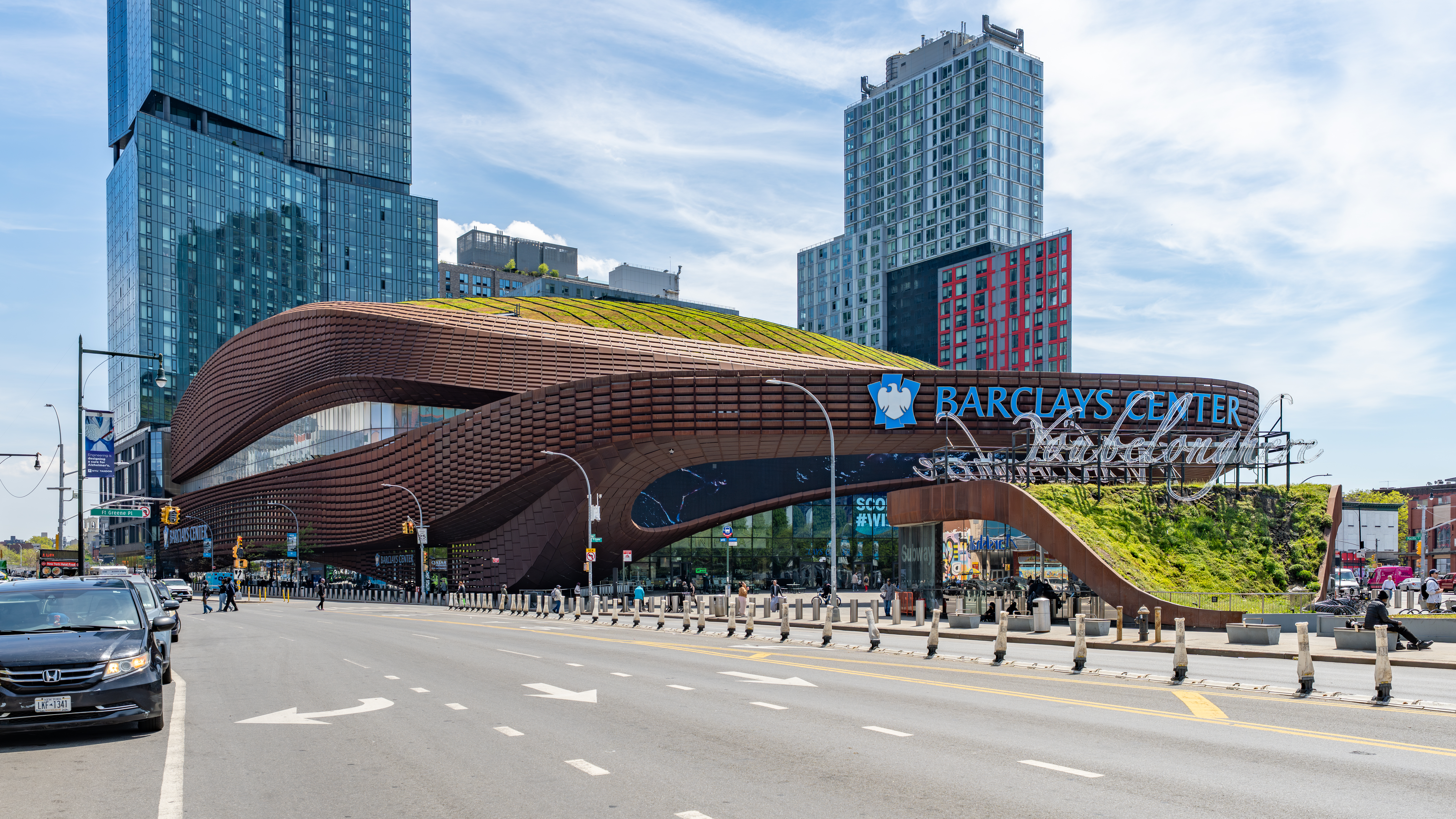
- Barclays Center in 2026

- Location in New York City Location in New York State Location in the United States
- Address: 620 Atlantic Avenue
- Location: Brooklyn, New York City, U.S.
- Coordinates: 40°40′57.58″N 73°58′30.81″W
- Owner: Empire State Development (State of New York) via Brooklyn Arena Local Development Corporation
- Operator: BSE Global / ASM Global
- Capacity: Basketball: 17,732; Ice hockey: 15,795; Concerts: 20,000; Boxing/Wrestling/MMA: 16,000; Tidal Theater: Approx. 6,000
- Public transit: Long Island Rail Road: Atlantic Terminal Atlantic Branch; New York City Subway: Atlantic Avenue–Barclays Center; MTA Regional Bus Operations: B37, B41, B45, B63, B65, B67, B103

Construction
- Groundbreaking: March 11, 2010
- Opened: September 21, 2012
- Cost: US$1 billion ($1.4 billion in 2025 dollars)
- Architects: AECOM (Ellerbe Becket); SHoP Architects
- Project manager: Forest City Realty Trust
- Structural engineer: Thornton Tomasetti
- Services engineer: WSP Flack + Kurtz
- General contractor: Hunt Construction Group

Tenants
- Brooklyn Nets (NBA) 2012–present New York Liberty (WNBA) 2021–present New York Islanders (NHL) 2015–2020; Long Island Nets (NBA D-League) 2016–2017; New York Mavericks (PBR) 2024; New York Empire (WTT) 2026–present

Website
- barclayscenter.com

Barclays Center (/ˈbɑːrkliz/ BAR-kleez) is a multi-purpose indoor arena in Brooklyn, New York City, US. The arena is home to the Brooklyn Nets of the National Basketball Association (NBA) and the New York Liberty of the Women's National Basketball Association (WNBA). The arena also hosts concerts, conventions and other sporting and entertainment events. It is part of the Pacific Park complex at Atlantic Avenue, next to the Atlantic Avenue–Barclays Center subway station and directly above the LIRR's Atlantic Terminal.

The arena opened on September 28, 2012 and its naming rights are held by Barclays. It is owned by the State of New York's Empire State Development authority through a public entity named the Brooklyn Arena Local Development Corporation. It is leased and managed by entities controlled by Brooklyn Nets owner Joseph Tsai.

The arena, proposed in 2004 when real estate developer Bruce Ratner purchased the Nets for $300 million as the first step of the process to build a new home for the team, experienced significant hurdles during its development. Its use of eminent domain and its potential environmental impact brought massive community resistance, especially as residential buildings and businesses such as the Ward Bakery and Freddy's bar were to be demolished and large amounts of public subsidies were used, which led to multiple lawsuits. The Great Recession also caused financing for the project to dry up. As a result, construction was delayed until 2010, with no secure funding for the project having been allotted. Groundbreaking for construction occurred on March 11, 2010, and the arena opened on September 21, 2012, which some 200 protesters also attended. The first event held at the Barclays Center was a sold-out Jay-Z concert on September 28, 2012.

== History ==
The arena was conceived by Bruce Ratner via his company, Forest City Realty Trust. He acquired the New Jersey Nets basketball team in 2004 for $300 million (he has since sold most of his shares to continue funding the project) for the purpose of moving them to the Pacific Park development on Brooklyn's Prospect Heights play in the arena that would be the centerpiece of the Pacific Park commercial and residential redevelopment project. The move had marked the return of major league sports to Brooklyn, which had been absent since the departure of the Dodgers to Los Angeles in 1957. Coincidentally, the original proposal for a domed stadium for the Brooklyn Dodgers was just north of the Pacific Park Brooklyn site, where the Atlantic Terminal Mall, also owned by Forest City, is located.

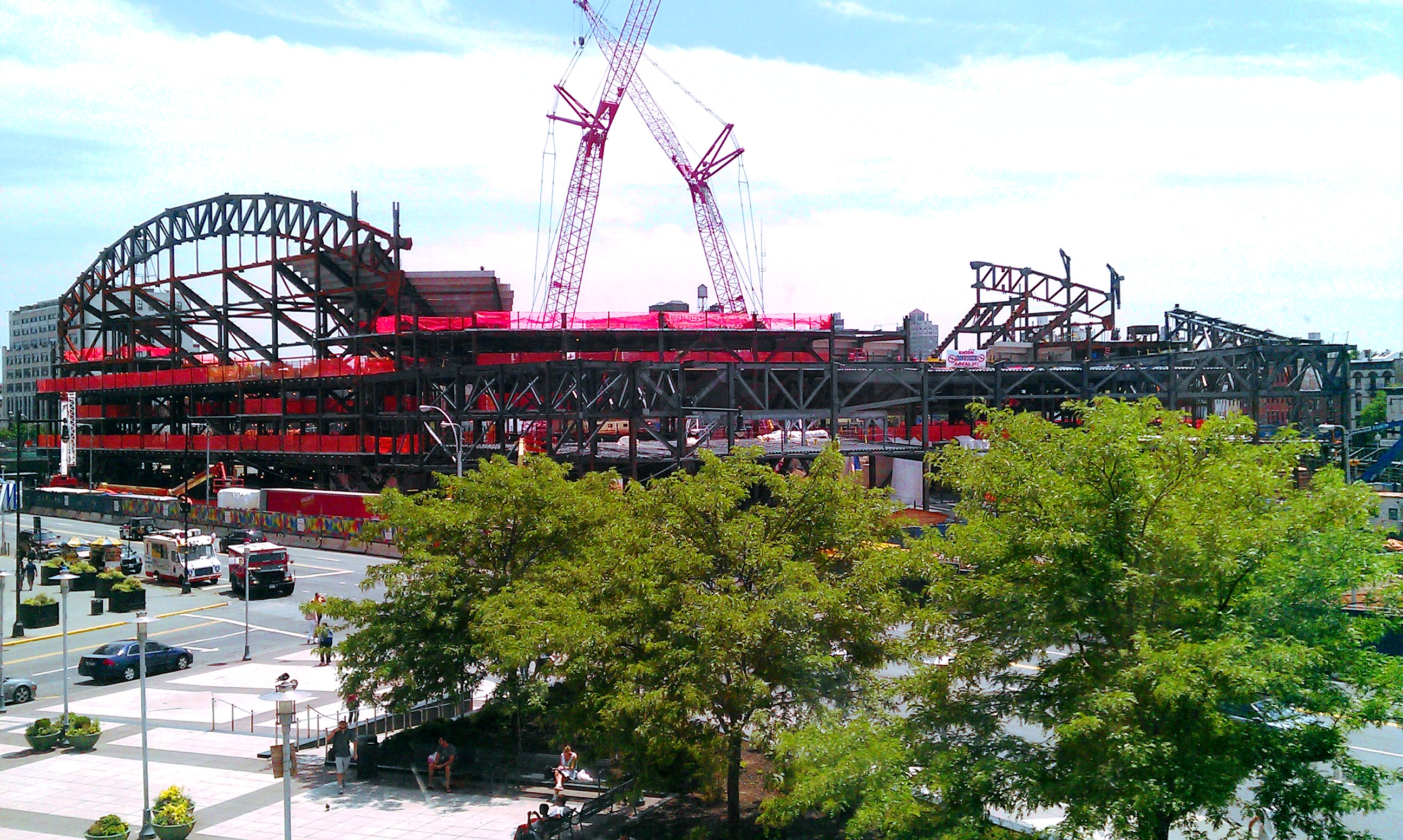
Barclays Center during construction June 19, 2011.

The arena was initially projected to open in 2006, with the rest of the Pacific Park Brooklyn complex to follow. However, controversies involving local residents, the use of eminent domain, potential environmental impact, lack of continued public financing, as well as a major economic downturn delayed the project. Due to these legal and financial troubles, the development deal seemed headed towards failure or collapse. Frank Gehry, an architect involved in the project's initial designs said, in March 2009, "I don't think it is going to happen," and Ratner at one point explored selling the team. On May 12, 2009, the New York State Supreme Court Appellate Division ruled unanimously in favor Bruce Ratner's firm in Matter of Goldstein v. New York State Urban Development Corp., upholding the use of eminent domain for the project. Opponents appealed the court decision but the decision was affirmed.

Russian businessman Mikhail Prokhorov agreed to a $200 million deal on September 23, 2009, to become a principal owner of the Nets and a key investor in the Brooklyn arena.

The Nets played two preseason games at Prudential Center in October 2009. The two preseason games were successful, and a deal that would have the Nets play at the Prudential Center for the 2010–11 and 2011–12 NBA seasons became more likely. Negotiations nearly fell apart, when the New Jersey Sports and Exhibition Authority refused to release the Nets from their lease at Izod. Negotiations resumed, and on February 18, 2010, the Nets finalized a deal that would move them to the Prudential Center in Newark, New Jersey until Barclays Center opened.

Another potential roadblock to this development resulted from the Appellate Court's negative decision regarding a similar eminent domain case, brought against Columbia University; opponents unsuccessfully tried to use Columbia's temporary victory to overturn their own eminent domain rulings regarding the Barclays Center.

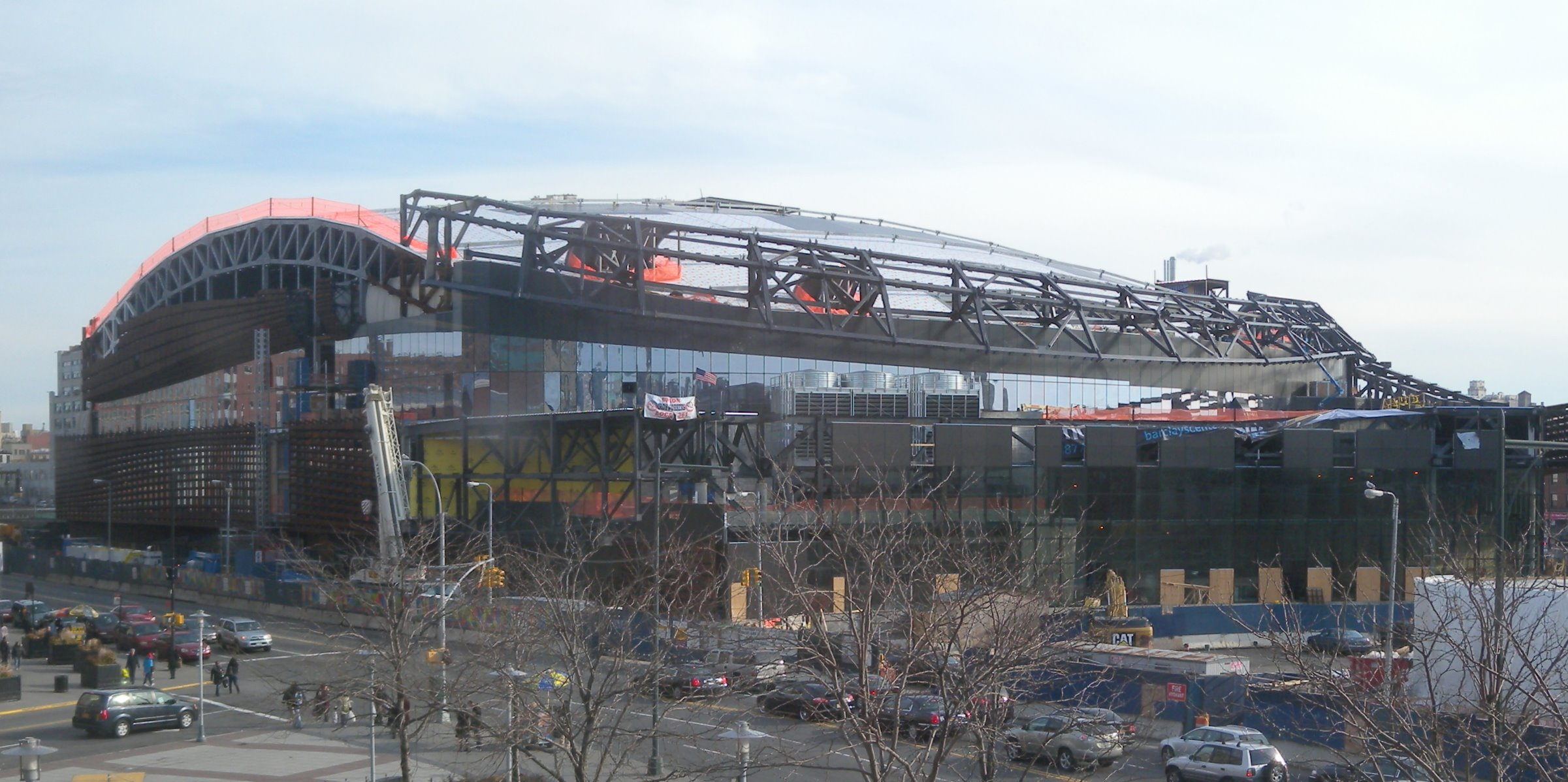
February 2012, just seven months before construction was finished

However, on March 1, 2010, Brooklyn Supreme Court Justice Abraham Gerges struck down a challenge by property owners, regarding the state's use of eminent domain, which allowed the private property to be condemned. Groundbreaking for the project occurred on March 11, 2010.

The first concrete was poured into Barclays Center's foundation in June 2010. Vertical construction began on November 23, 2010, with the erection of the first steel piece. The arena topped out on January 12, 2012, and was opened to the public on September 21, 2012.

Barclays Bank agreed to a 20-year naming rights agreement for $400 million in 2007. However, two years later, due to the slump in the economy the deal was renegotiated to $200 million.

The New York Islanders of the National Hockey League (NHL) announced on October 24, 2012, that the franchise would move to Barclays Center in 2015 after the expiration of their lease at the Nassau Veterans Memorial Coliseum, which the team had called home since its inception in 1972. The deal did not require the involvement of the New York Rangers, as the Islanders' agreement with the Rangers to share the New York area allows them to play their home games anywhere on Long Island, including the two city boroughs on the island, Brooklyn and Queens.

While Barclays Center was conceived as a multipurpose arena that could accommodate the Nets and an NHL team, it was built mainly for basketball. While it can accommodate an NHL-size rink, the scoreboard was off-centered above the blue line that is closer to the arena's southeast end. Capacity for hockey is 15,795, the second-smallest in the league (behind Winnipeg's Canada Life Centre). The seating arrangement for hockey is asymmetrical. There are only three rows of permanent seating on the northwest end of the arena, and at least 416 seats were not sold at all due to poor sight lines. As a result of the signing of the lease, the two KHL games scheduled to be played in the arena on January 20 and 21, 2013 between Dynamo Moscow and SKA St. Petersburg were moved back to their teams' home venues. As part of the deal, the management of the Barclays Center took over the business operations of the Islanders when the team moved to Brooklyn, though Charles Wang remained principal owner and continued to oversee hockey operations. This arrangement continued after Wang sold controlling interest in the Islanders to Jon Ledecky and Scott D. Malkin. Business operations were returned to the Islanders following the 2018–19 season.

According to Billboard magazine, Barclays Center passed Madison Square Garden as the highest-grossing venue in the US for concerts and family shows, not counting sports events. That statistic was based on ticket sales between November 1, 2012, and May 31, 2013. On February 24, 2015, an ironworker was killed when four joists fell on him as he was helping to install the arena's green roof.

Poor reception of the arena's quality as a hockey venue affected the Islanders' average attendance in comparison to Nassau Coliseum, which fell to an NHL low of 12,059 (the arena itself is also the second-smallest in the league). The team began to seek an exit from Barclays, although NHL officials judged that the Coliseum (even with its recent renovations) would not be suitable as a full-time venue, as it lacked amenities common in new facilities. On June 21, 2018, the Islanders announced that they would begin to play a portion of their home schedule at Nassau Coliseum until the completion of UBS Arena.

On September 18, 2019, Joe Tsai completed the acquisition of full ownership of the Brooklyn Nets and Barclays Center. With the closing of the transaction, Tsai became NBA Governor of the Nets and its affiliates and Chairman of Barclays Center. Media and sports executive David Levy was named Chief Executive Officer of the Brooklyn Nets and Barclays Center by Joe Tsai. Tsai also purchased the WNBA's New York Liberty in 2019 and relocated the team to the Barclays Center in 2020. For Liberty games, ticket sales will initially be capped at about 8,000.

In July 2021, it was announced that as part of a deal with the Nets and BSE Global, SeatGeek would take over ticketing duties for Barclays Center events beginning with the 2021–22 Brooklyn Nets season, ending the arena's relationship with Ticketmaster and breaking Ticketmaster's monopoly over ticketing for New York's major arenas. In January 2023, it was announced that the deal would end earlier than expected and that Ticketmaster would return to handle ticketing for Barclays Center events starting with the 2023 New York Liberty season, as well for events whose tickets went on sale on or after January 14, 2023.

BSE Global ended the deal with SeatGeek after encountering multiple technical issues, which led to lower than expected ticket sales for concerts at the arena. SeatGeek's time as the ticketing provider for events at the arena was met with multiple technical issues, as well as lower than expected ticket sales for concerts that were partly caused by these issues. A 2021 New Year's Eve show by The Strokes (which was later delayed to April 2022 due to concerns over the SARS-CoV-2 Omicron variant) experienced technical issues during a presale that cost the band hundreds of thousands of dollars according to their booking agents (the show ended up only selling 13,548 tickets and grossing $1,570,000 in total, which was 2,000 tickets and $400,000 less than the group's 2019 New Year's Eve show at the arena, which their booking agents blamed on SeatGeek's user interface and not the popularity of the band). In addition, a show by Genesis as part of their The Last Domino? Tour that was booked for the arena due to high demand for the tour's other shows in New York also experienced technical issues after tickets went on sale and saw lower than expected ticket sales, which led to the show later being canceled.

A renovation of Barclays Center was announced in 2024, and Populous and Shawmut Design & Construction were hired to design the project. The renovation was estimated to cost $150 million by 2026. The project included replacing 30 suites with club spaces called the Row and the Key, along with new art, a new atrium, and a separate entrance for American Express cardholders.

== Financing ==
The arena is owned by the Brooklyn Arena Local Development Corporation, a public entity and is leased to affiliates of Joe Tsai. Being publicly owned, the financing of the stadium was eligible for tax-exempt bonds, which were issued in 2009 for a total of $510,999,996.50.

== Design ==
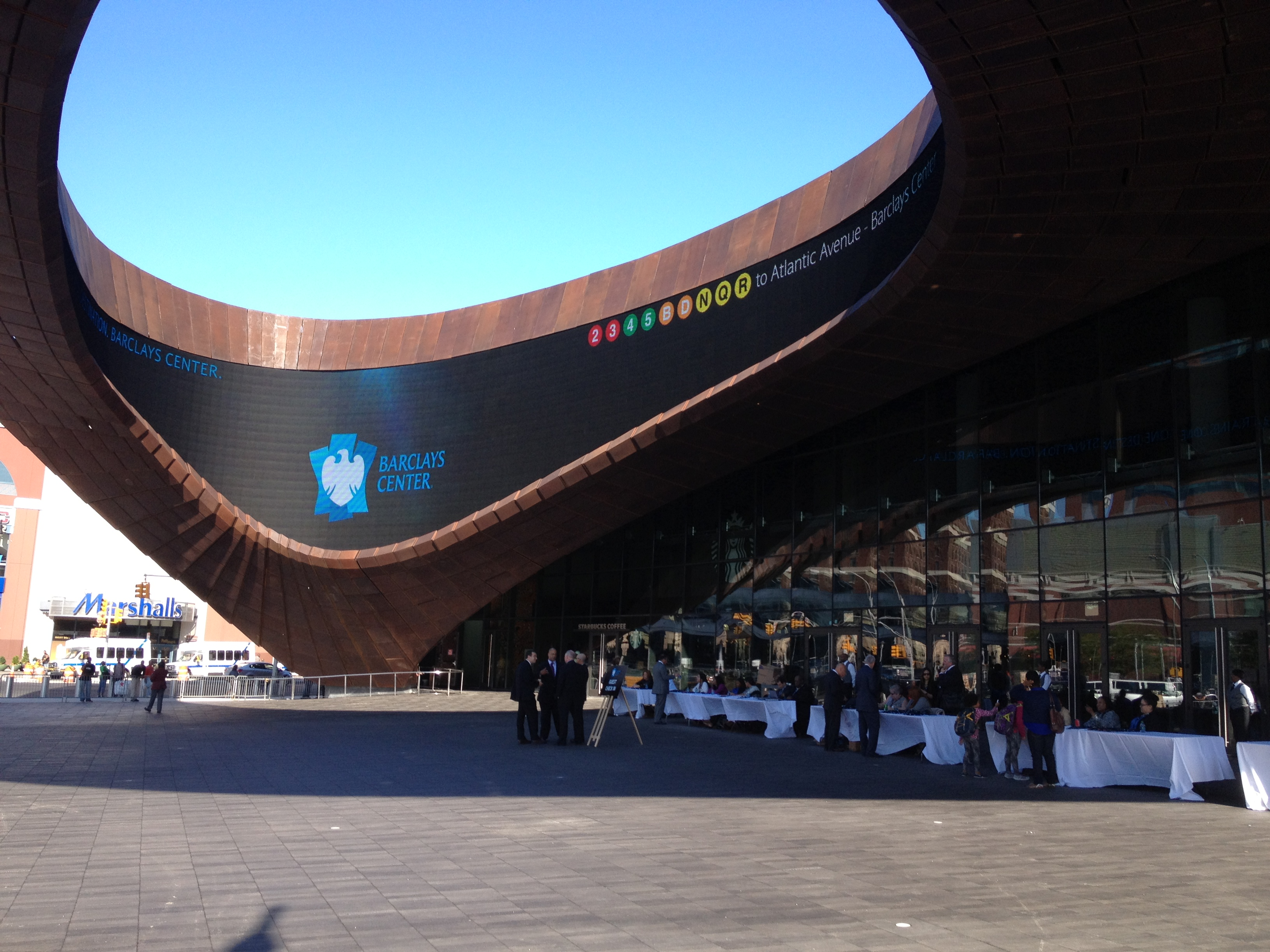
The Barclays Center oculus, with a view of the LCD screen inside the structure

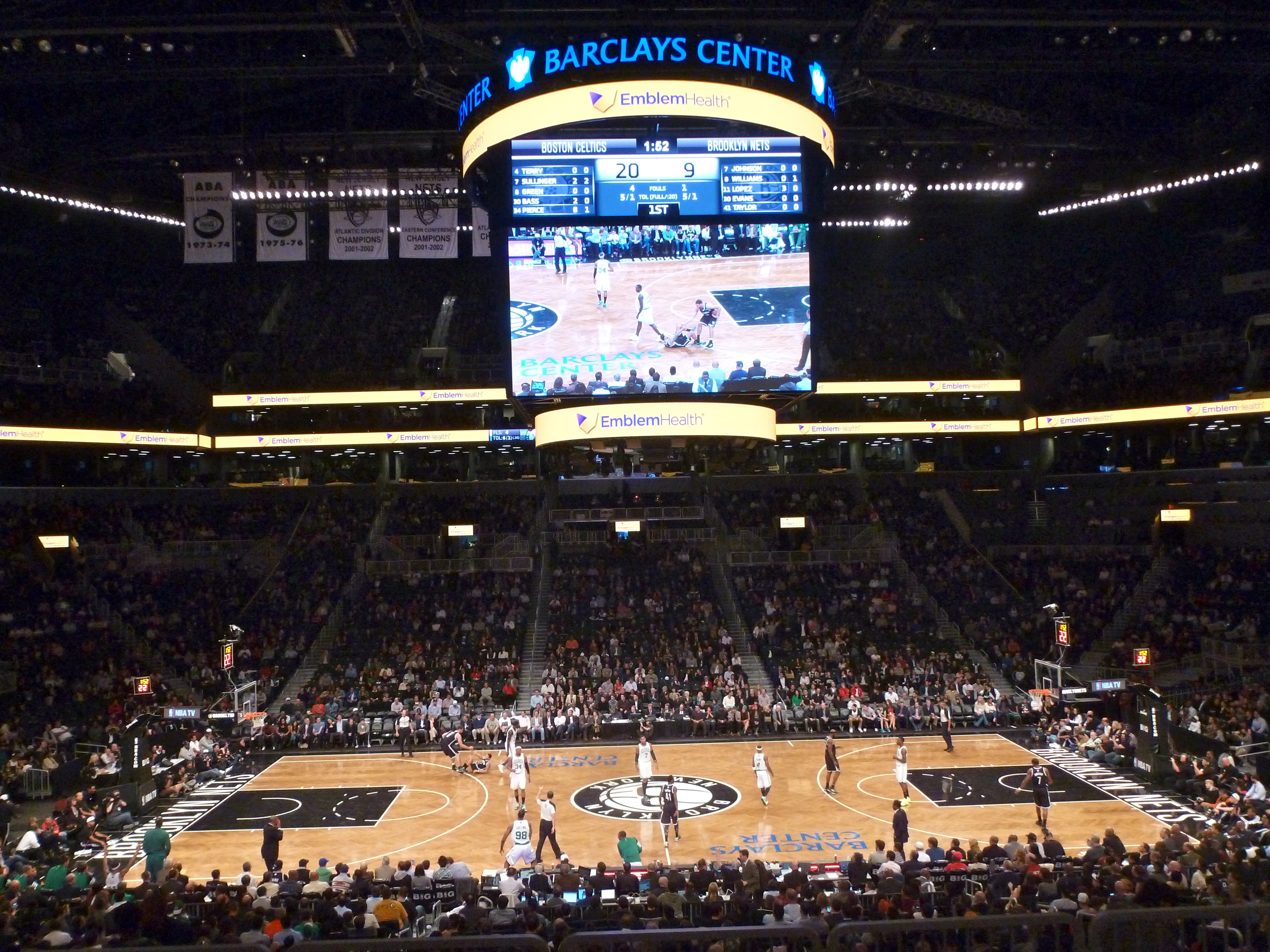
Interior view of the Barclays Center during an NBA game

Barclays Center was designed by the architect firm SHoP Architects. Ellerbe Becket/AECOM served as the project Architect of record.

Initial concepts for the area were designed by Frank Gehry, whose design proposed a rooftop park (open only to residents of the Atlantic Yards complex) ringed by an open-air running track and capable of doubling as an ice skating rink in winter with panoramic, year-round views of Manhattan. The famed architect's tallest tower, called Miss Brooklyn at 620 feet, was also part of this plan. Gehry's plans carried a projected cost of $1 billion. Forest City unveiled a scaled-back version of the project in February 2008 reducing Miss Brooklyn's size 40%, and making it 109 feet (33 m) shorter. Another redesign unveiled just over two months later scrapped Miss Brooklyn entirely, and in January 2009, the developer started "value engineering" the arena design, cutting its budget even more. In September 2009 the Becket/SHoP proposal with a projected cost (initially) of $800 million (ultimately itself revised to $1 billion) was unveiled.

Externally, the arena's shape features three articulated bands, with a glass curtain wall covered by a "latticework" composed of 12,000 preweathered steel panels engineered and constructed by ASI Limited/SHoP Construction meant to evoke the image of Brooklyn's brownstones. A 117-by-56-foot (36 by 17 m) oculus extends over a 5,660-square-foot (526 m^{2}) section of the plaza outside of the main arena entrance with an irregularly shaped display screen looping the interior face of the oculus. The arena floor's location below grade allows people in the plaza to view the scoreboard.

There are two sports lighting systems inside the arena bowl: one for the Nets and one for everyone else. The Nets lighting creates a theater-like effect where the court pops like a stage while the rest of the arena goes dark. Additionally, the Nets basketball court has featured a herringbone pattern since the arena opened in 2012. The basketball courts used for other events at the arena generally do not feature this pattern.

Unlike most other urban venues in the US, Barclays Center has no dedicated parking lot; however, it is easily accessible by subway, bus, and railroad. To accommodate entry to the facility, the arena's 38,885-square-foot (3,613 m^{2}) entrance plaza features a $76 million transit connection hub that serves as the plaza's focal point. The transit structure connects with the refurbished Atlantic Avenue–Barclays Center subway station, whose renovation was designed by New York City firm Stantec.

The original plan promised indoor room for bicycles, but the plan was changed before the arena's opening with outdoor racks for 400 bicycles, which were eventually taken away due to lack of use. The number of parking spaces was also reduced.

Because of the constrained site, there are only two truck and bus entrances into the building. They consist of two side-by-side 80,000 pounds (36,000 kg) capacity elevators which lower vehicles 34 feet (10 m) below street grade into a loading dock area. Vehicles roll out onto an enormous turntable which rotates them into position opposite one of four loading docks arrayed around the turntable.

=== Artwork ===
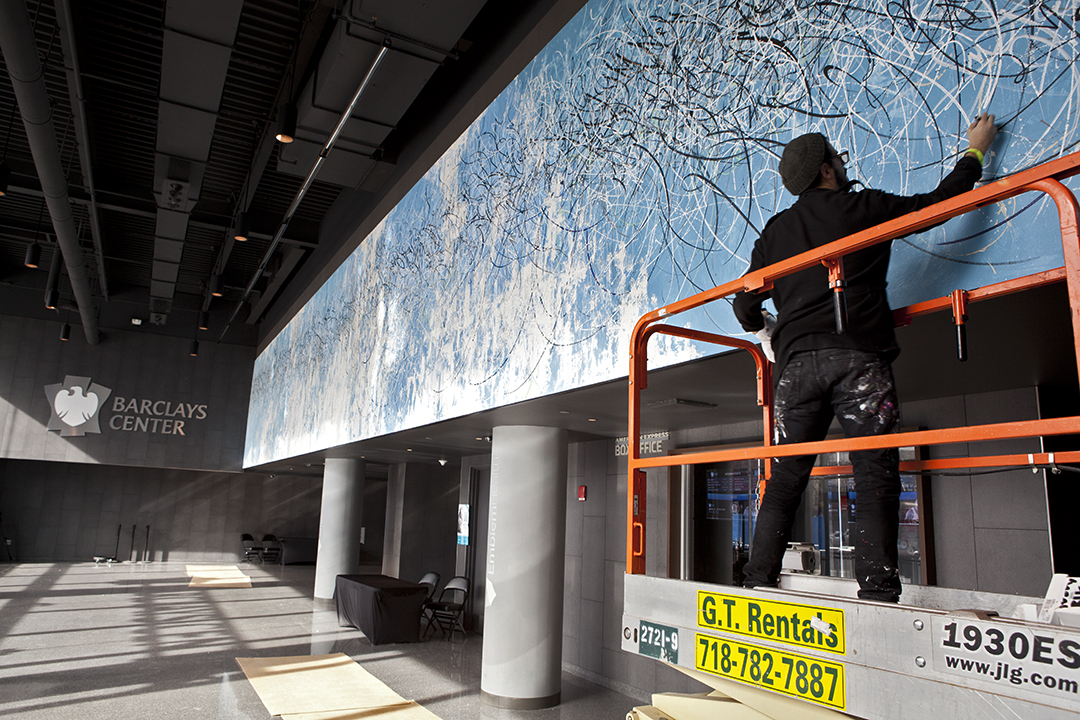
Artist José Parla working on the mural Diary of Brooklyn in the Barclays Center

The building features the mural Diary of Brooklyn by painter José Parlá, which measures 10 feet (3.0 m) wide and 70 feet (21 m) tall. According to Parlá, the painting is all about language; the painting contains words and phrases such as "immigration," "Brooklyn is" and "Big Daddy Kane." The piece was commissioned in 2012 and took six months to complete.

On April 2, 2026, Paul Pfeiffer was announced to be the inaugural artist-in-residence for the arena, working with Shaun Leonardo and the Social Justice Fund “on a year-long project titled Exodus to lead media workshops with youth and adults who have been affected by the criminal-justice system.”

Sarah Sze was commissioned to create Wave to be displayed in the center’s atrium; the work "will consist of more than 250 screens capturing animated projections and images." The Center will also open a new entrance on Flatbush Avenue and display Mark Bradford’s Tina (from 2006) and Rashid Johnson’s Untitled Anxious Audience (from 2019). In May 2027, the Center will unveil a large-scale sculpture We Always Have Room for One More by Kambui Olujimi featuring "a group of larger-than-life bronze figures playing the Brooklyn street game Skelly." This art initiative is part of the Center’s Brooklyn Art Encounters “a new multi-year initiative to continue public art presentations on the building’s high-profile plaza but also move into other realms.”

== Naming rights ==
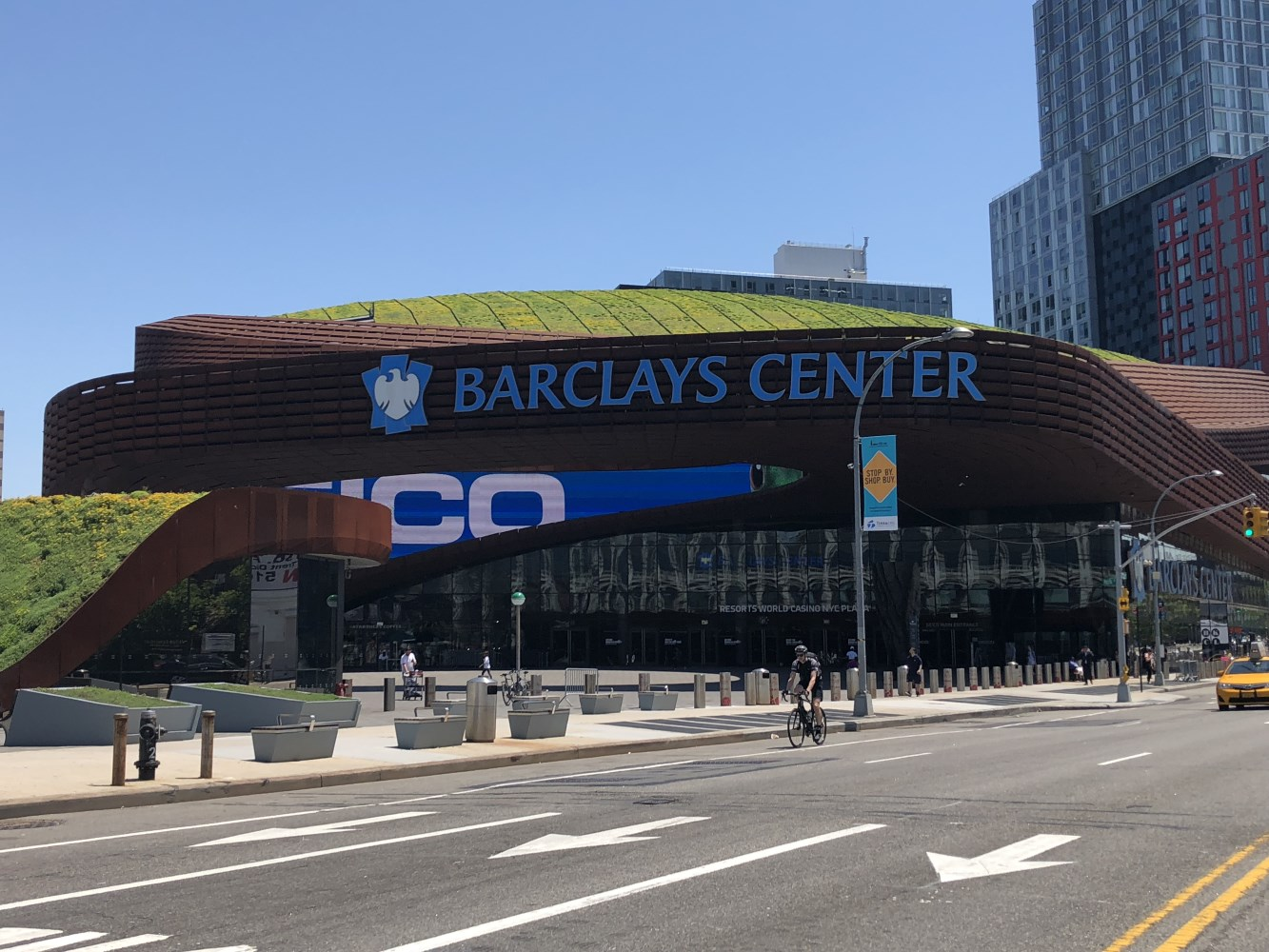
Seen in 2018

On January 18, 2007, it was announced that the arena would be called Barclays Center, after Barclays agreed to pay $400 million over the next 20 years for the naming rights, a record high price for naming rights. Barclays does not have any retail banks in the US nor does it have its own ATMs in the arena.

== Accessibility and transportation ==
Barclays Center is located next to Atlantic Terminal, which services the Long Island Rail Road's Atlantic Branch. Barclays Center is also accessible via the New York City Subway, via the 2, 3, 4, 5, B, D, N, Q, R and W trains, which stop at Atlantic Avenue–Barclays Center.

MTA Regional Bus Operations service is provided by B37, B41, B45, B63, B65, B67, and B103 buses.

== Notable events ==
=== Basketball ===
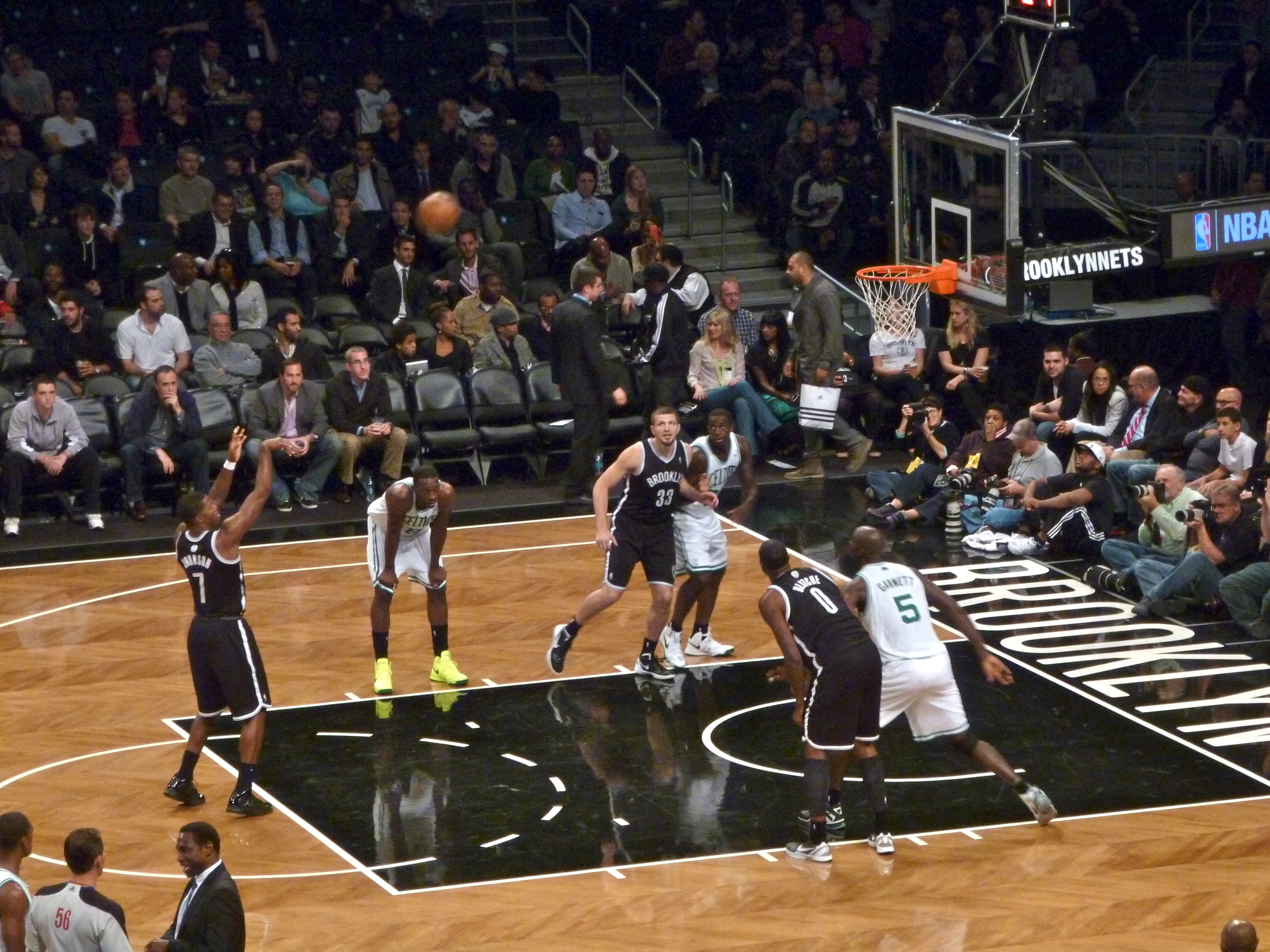
The Brooklyn Nets playing against the Boston Celtics in 2012

The first NBA basketball game played at the new arena was an NBA preseason game between the Nets and the Washington Wizards on October 15, 2012.

The first regular-season NBA game at the Barclays Center took place on November 3, 2012, when the Nets beat the visiting Toronto Raptors 107–100. The originally scheduled season opener home game was supposed to take place on November 1 against now-cross town rivals the New York Knicks, in what was planned to be a historic event; however, the game was canceled by NYC Mayor Michael Bloomberg due to mass transportation outages and a shortage of available police caused by Hurricane Sandy.

The venue hosted the NBA draft starting with the 2013 event on June 27, 2013 and it has been ever since, except the 2020 event was held via videoconferencing. In addition to that, they have also hosted the NBA All-Star Weekend festivities in 2015.

Barclays Center was also the home for the Long Island Nets of the NBA Development League, now the NBA G League, during the 2016–17 season while the Nassau Veterans Memorial Coliseum was being renovated for the 2017–18 season.

The first WNBA game held at Barclays Center came on May 14, 2021, when the host New York Liberty defeated the Indiana Fever 90–87. The arena hosted three games of the 2024 WNBA Finals, in which the Liberty won its first WNBA championship at home following a 67–62 win in Game 5 against the Minnesota Lynx.

Due to the 2024 NBA draft, the Liberty's Commissioner's Cup championship game against the Lynx was moved from Barclays Center to UBS Arena.

==== College basketball ====
Since its opening, the center has hosted a number of college basketball events. Kentucky and Maryland signed multi-year agreements to play games at the arena after competing head-to-head in 2012. The arena hosts three early-season basketball tournaments: Barclays Center Classic, Coaches vs. Cancer Classic, and Legends Classic. The arena has also been an alternate home arena for the LIU Brooklyn Blackbirds men's basketball (now LIU Sharks men's basketball) team since 2012.

The Atlantic 10 Conference announced Barclays Center as the new home of the conference's men's basketball tournament beginning in 2013. The Atlantic Coast Conference announced the 2017 and 2018 ACC men's basketball tournament to be hosted at the Barclays Center. This is a break of tradition from being hosted at the "unofficial" home of the tournament at the Greensboro Coliseum in Greensboro, North Carolina where it is usually held. As part of a three-way agreement with Barclays and the ACC, the A-10 returned its men's basketball championship to the Barclays Center in 2019, 2020 (which was cancelled after the first round due to the COVID-19 pandemic and 2021 (which was moved to campus sites due the ongoing pandemic). The arena and the A-10 agreed to extend the partnership for the 2023 and 2024 championships.

In 2016, Barclays Center hosted games in the NCAA Division I men's basketball tournament for the first time. Notable moments at the Brooklyn site include a tip-in at the buzzer by Adam Woodbury to lift the Iowa Hawkeyes past Temple in overtime, 14th-seeded Stephen F. Austin's upset win over 3rd-seeded West Virginia, and Rex Plfueger's last-second tip-in to help Notre Dame avert an upset bid by Stephen F. Austin in the second round. The arena was scheduled to host an NCAA Regional in 2021; however, the NCAA moved all games of the 2021 championship to the Indianapolis area. The arena and the Atlantic 10 will serve as a First and Second Round site for the 2024 NCAA tournament.

=== Hockey ===
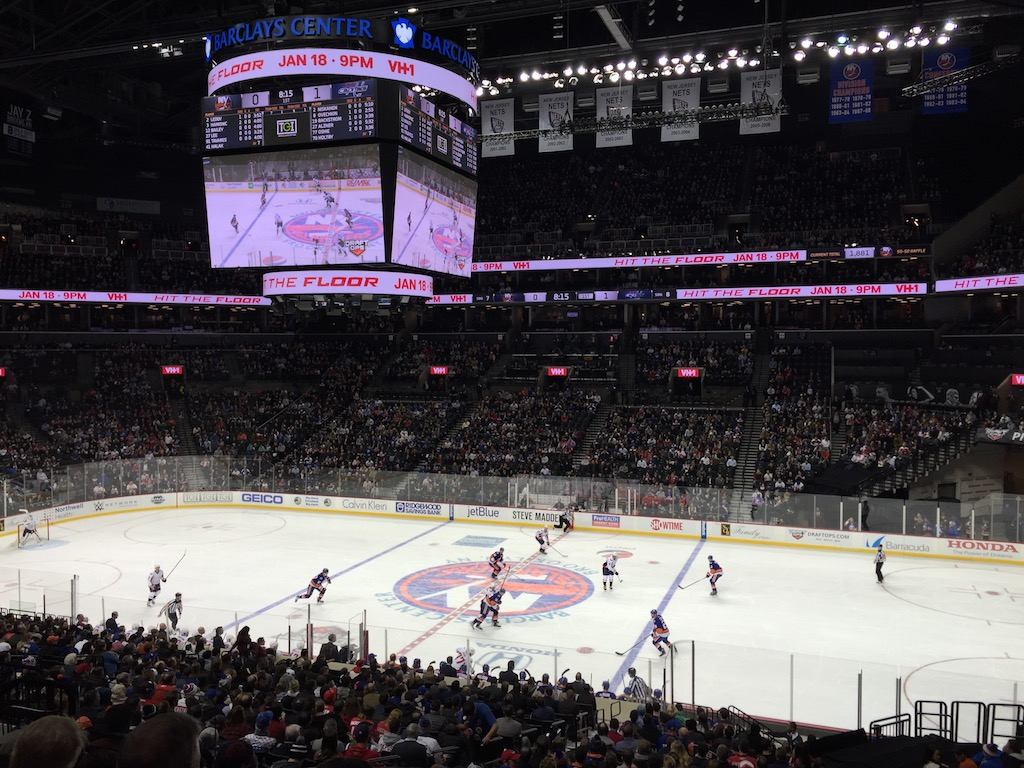
The New York Islanders playing against the Washington Capitals in 2016

The New York Islanders moved from Nassau Coliseum to Barclays Center before the 2015–16 NHL season.

The Islanders played the first NHL hockey game at Barclays Center in a preseason game on September 21, 2013, losing to the New Jersey Devils 3–0 in front of a crowd of 14,689. The first goal in the arena's history was scored by Jacob Josefson of the New Jersey Devils. An Islanders game was scheduled for the previous preseason but was canceled due to the 2012–13 NHL lockout. The Islanders and Devils played again on September 26, 2014. This time, the Islanders defeated New Jersey 3–2 in a shootout. The first goal in Islanders Brooklyn history was scored in the first period on a power play (and a delayed penalty call) by defenseman Ryan Pulock.

The first regular-season game was played on October 9, 2015, against the 2015 Stanley Cup champions the Chicago Blackhawks, who won the game 3–2 in overtime. This was the sixth NHL game at Barclays Center, following five total preseason contests (three in 2015), and one Islanders rookie scrimmage. The first NHL regular-season goal scored in the Barclays Center was a shorthanded goal by Artem Anisimov for the Blackhawks in the first period, while John Tavares scored in the second period and was the first Islander to do so.

The first Stanley Cup playoffs game at Barclays Center was held on April 17, 2016, when the Islanders defeated the Florida Panthers 4–3 in game three of the first-round series between the two teams. Seven nights later, the arena hosted game 6 of the series, which turned out to be the longest home game in Islanders history. In that game, the Islanders were trailing 1–0 when Tavares scored the game-tying goal with 53.2 seconds left in regulation; he would then score the series-clinching goal in double overtime to give the Islanders their first playoff series win since 1993.

The Islanders moved to the newly constructed UBS Arena in 2021–22 season. New York State governor Andrew Cuomo announced on February 29, 2020, that the Islanders would play all home games in the 2020–21 season at Nassau Coliseum, their former home. It was also announced that the Islanders would play all of their home playoff games during the 2020 Stanley Cup playoffs at Nassau Coliseum, meaning that their final game played at the Barclays Center was scheduled to be on March 22, 2020, against the Carolina Hurricanes. However, all NHL games were postponed on March 12 due to the COVID-19 pandemic in North America. At that point in time, the Islanders had six home games left in the regular season, two in Brooklyn and four in Nassau County, as well as six road games, and were one point shy of the eighth and final playoff spot in the Eastern Conference. While the Nassau Coliseum was closed indefinitely in June 2020, and the Islanders were reported to return to Barclays Center for the 2020–21 season if the Coliseum remained unavailable, a new leaseholder allowed the Islanders to play their 2020–21 home games there, meaning the final game at Barclays Center was March 3, 2020, a 6–2 loss against the Montreal Canadiens.

=== Boxing ===
Several boxing matches have taken place in the arena, including Danny Garcia vs. Zab Judah and Paulie Malignaggi vs. Adrien Broner in 2013, Ruslan Provodnikov vs. Chris Algieri in 2014, Deontay Wilder vs. Robert Helenius in 2022, and Devin Haney vs. Ryan Garcia in 2024.

=== Mixed martial arts ===
The venue hosted UFC 208: Holm vs. de Randamie on February 11, 2017, and it hosted UFC 223: Khabib vs. Iaquinta on April 7, 2018, and UFC Fight Night: Cejudo vs. Dillashaw on January 19, 2019.

=== Gymnastics ===
In November 2016, Barclays Center hosted the Kellogg's Tour of Gymnastics Champions.

=== Music ===
In addition to many concerts from various musical acts, Barclays Center hosted the 2013 MTV Video Music Awards on August 25, 2013, the first major award show to take place in Brooklyn.

The 2020 ceremony was supposed to take place in Barclays Center but due to COVID-19 lockdowns, the ceremony took place in various outdoor locations instead.

The 2021 ceremony was held at Barclays.

=== Professional wrestling ===
The arena has also hosted many WWE wrestling events. The first show held at the venue was the Tables, Ladders, and Chairs PPV event which famously held the first match for The Shield (Roman Reigns, Seth Rollins, and Dean Ambrose). They would continue to hold several WWE Raw episodes including its 25th anniversary episode in January 2018.

In August 2015, Barclays Center hosted SummerSlam along with NXT TakeOver: Brooklyn the night before and a post-SummerSlam Raw the next day, resulting in three consecutive nights of sellouts. Annual weekends of SummerSlam events were held in 2016, 2017, and 2018 with the inclusion of a post-SummerSlam SmackDown Live broadcast to the events.

In April 2019, the arena held some events related to WrestleMania 35, which was mainly held at MetLife Stadium. Barclays Center hosted NXT TakeOver: New York, the 2019 WWE Hall of Fame induction ceremony, along with post-WrestleMania editions of Raw and SmackDown Live.

The arena hosted Survivor Series on November 21, 2021, followed by Raw the next day.

=== Esports ===
The arena has hosted ESL One New York in October 2016, September 2017, September 2018, and September 2019.

In May 2018, Blizzard Entertainment announced the Grand Finals for the inaugural season of the Overwatch League would be held at Barclays Center. The event was held on July 27–28, 2018.

The arena will host the 2026 League of Legends World Championship final on 14 November.

=== Bull riding ===
In 2024, Barclays Center became the home venue of the New York Mavericks; one of ten bull riding teams of the Professional Bull Riders (PBR) Team Series held in the summer and autumn. Each team has their own hometown event. There are also two "neutral site" events during the season, which culminates at T-Mobile Arena in Las Vegas, Nevada, in October to determine the PBR Team Series Champion.

In 2025, the New York Mavericks changed their home venue to UBS Arena.

=== Commencement ceremonies ===
Barclays Center became the location of Brooklyn College's annual commencement venue ever since 2017 when U.S. Senator Bernie Sanders returned to his hometown and delivered the address, except 2020 and 2021 due to COVID-19 pandemic and had to be held virtually.

In May 2025, the 100th annual commencement of Brooklyn College was held at Barclays Center.

== Issues ==
=== Racism allegations ===
Barclays Center was accused of mistreating luxury box holders who are African-American. Three employees of Ludwig's Pharmacy in Prospect Heights claimed in a lawsuit filed in October 2013 that they were singled out for bad treatment at the arena because they are black. In 2016, the lawsuit was summarily dismissed.

=== Labor issues ===
In February 2013, a group of 120 part-time construction workers who work to convert the arena from a concert hall to a sports venue unsuccessfully tried to switch unions. The pay for part-time work is structured differently than that of the same work at Madison Square Garden, and workers have complained about not being able to make a living on one-day-a-month work at $14/hour, and being barred from collecting unemployment.

=== Quality as a hockey venue ===
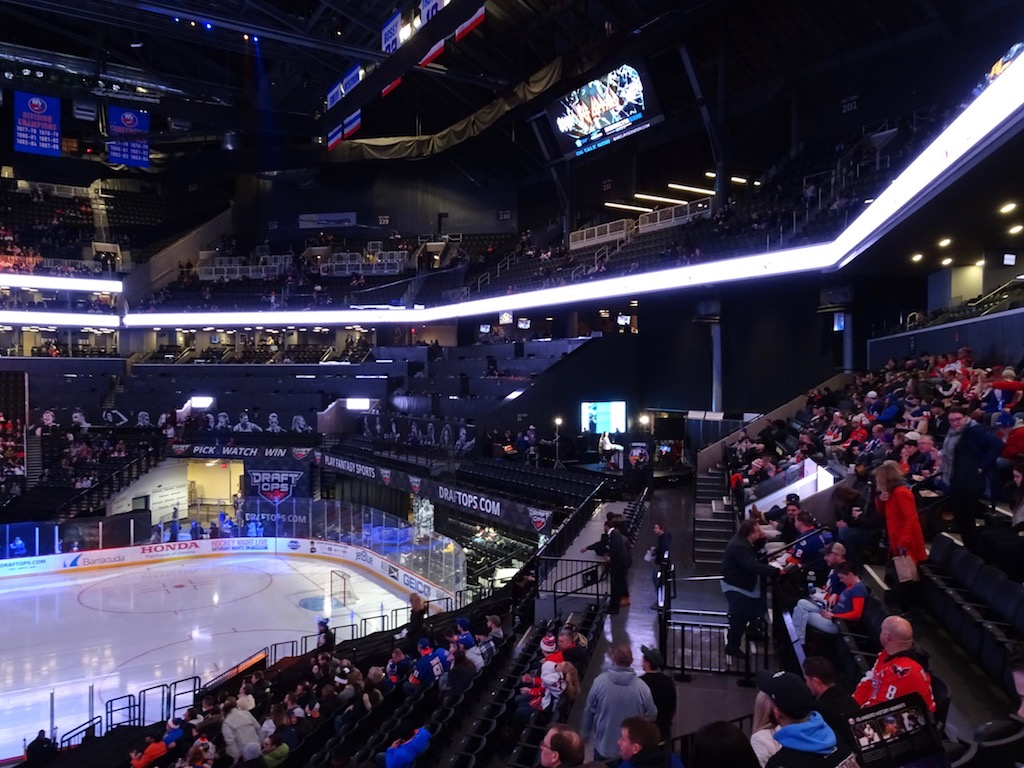
Seats with obstructed view

As the arena was not originally designed with hockey in mind, the New York Islanders' move to Barclays Center resulted in complaints about seats with obstructed views and the arena's ice quality.

Some seats were singled out for having poor and obstructed sightlines during hockey games. Business Insider has called sections 201 to 204 and 228 to 231, "the worst seat in American professional sports". Barclays Center CEO Brett Yormark acknowledged the issue, but insisted nothing can be done: "There's really nothing we're going to do from a capital improvement standpoint. You can watch the game on your mobile device. The game is on the scoreboard." There have also been complaints over the quality of the ice during hockey games. The arena uses PVC piping instead of steel piping under the ice surface, making it much harder to maintain ice consistent with NHL standards for quality and temperature.

== Gallery ==
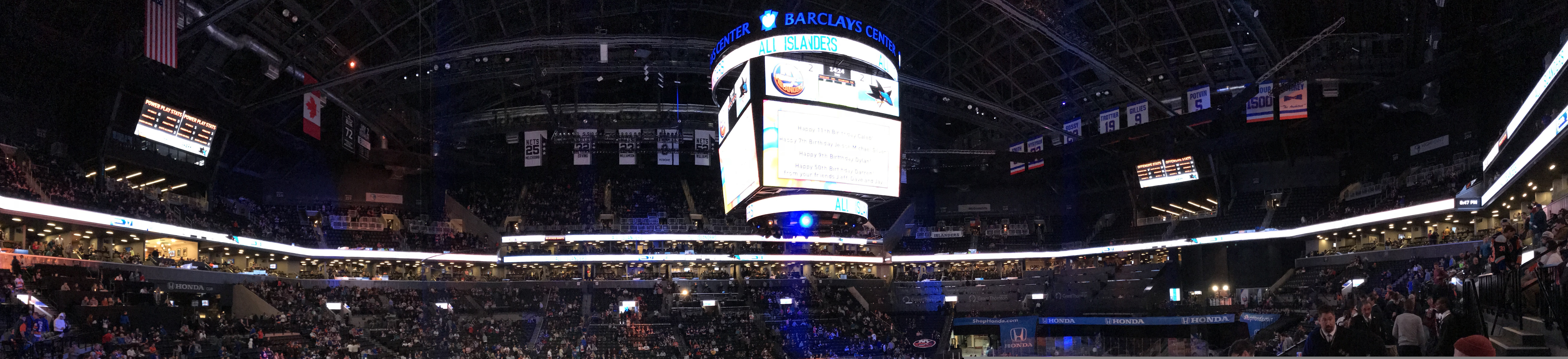
Panorama of Barclays Center

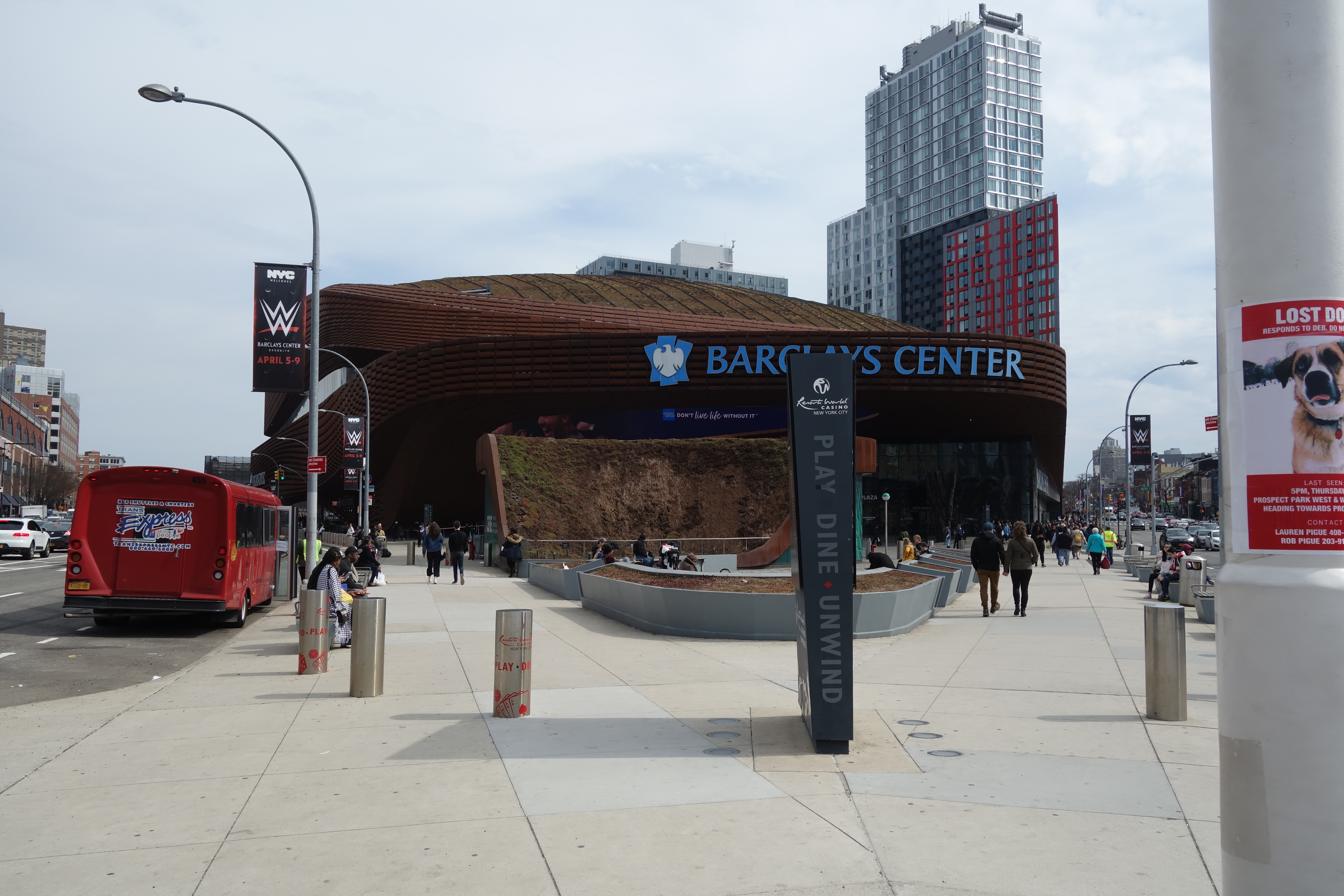
Barclays Center

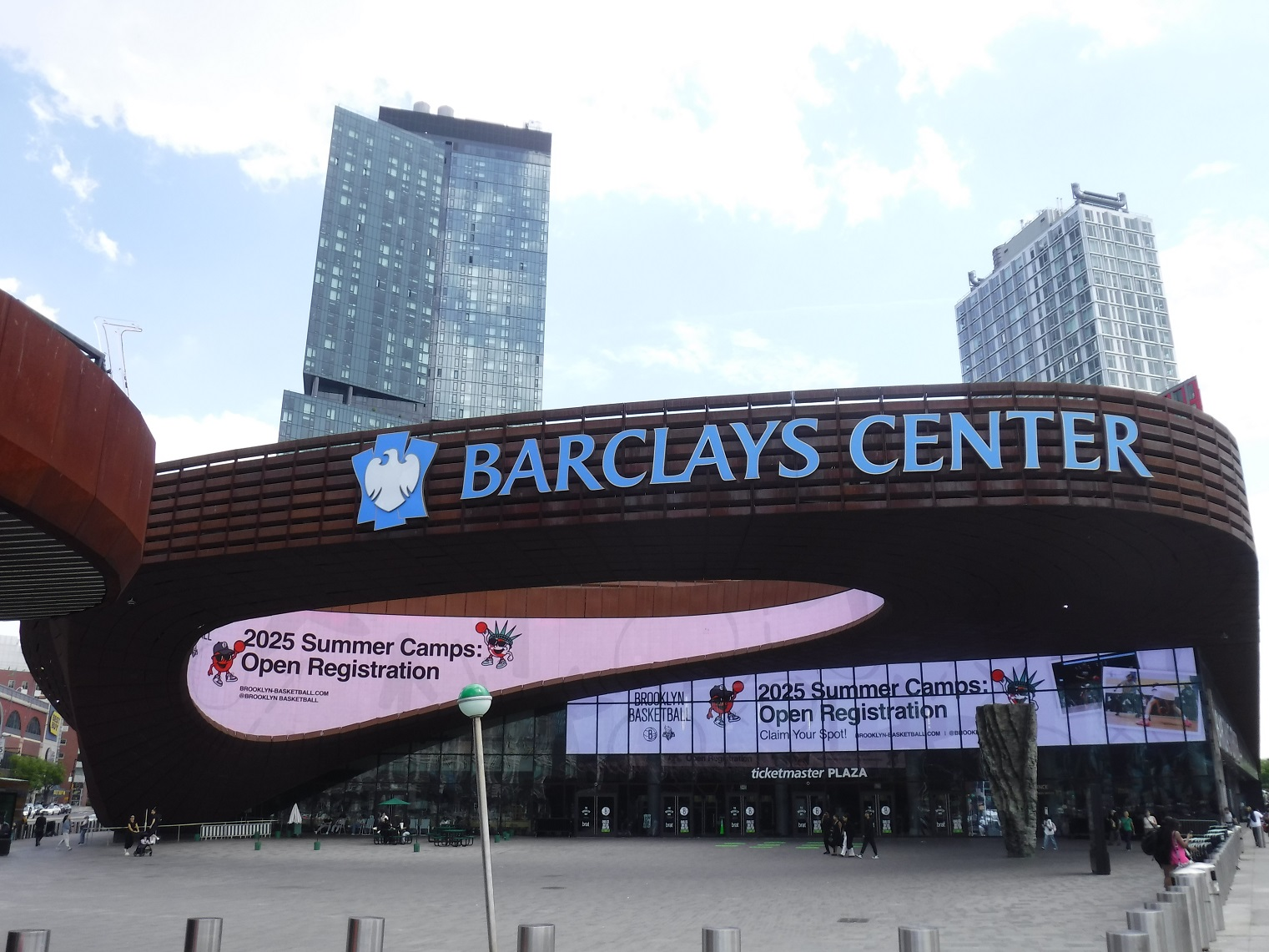
Barclays Center as seen on 2 May 2025 near subway station entrance

== See also ==
- List of indoor arenas by capacity
- List of indoor arenas in the United States

Preceded by Prudential Center	Home of the Brooklyn Nets; 2012–present	Succeeded by Current
Preceded by Nassau Veterans Memorial Coliseum	Home of the New York Islanders; 2015–2020	Succeeded by Nassau Veterans Memorial Coliseum
Preceded by Westchester County Center	Home of the New York Liberty; 2020–present	Succeeded by Current
Preceded by Staples Center	MTV Video Music Awards; 2013	Succeeded by The Forum
Preceded by Dong'an Lake Sports Park Multifunctional Gymnasium	League of Legends World Championship; Final Venue; 2026	Succeeded by Seoul Arena
