= Atlantic Terminal (shopping mall) =

Atlantic Terminal Atlantic Center
- Exterior of Atlantic Terminal, showing the mall entrance at Atlantic Avenue and the Target guest purchase unloading area
- Location: Brooklyn, New York
- Coordinates: 40.684533°N 73.976781°W
- Address: 139 Flatbush Avenue and 625 Atlantic Avenue,
- Opened: November 1996; 30 years ago
- Developer: Madison International Realty
- Manager: Madison International Realty
- Owner: Madison International Realty
- Num. of stores: 35
- Num. of anchor tenants: 4
- Floor area: 370,000 sq ft (34,000 m^{2}) in Atlantic Terminal; 393,713 sq ft (36,577.1 m^{2}) in Atlantic Center
- Floors: 5 in Atlantic Terminal
- Public transit: Long Island Rail Road: Atlantic Terminal (Atlantic Branch); New York City Subway: Atlantic Avenue–Barclays Center
- Website: Atlantic Terminal Webpage

Atlantic Terminal and Atlantic Center are two shopping malls located on Atlantic Avenue that are surrounded by Hanson Place, Fort Greene Place and Flatbush Avenue in the Fort Greene section of Brooklyn, New York City, near Downtown Brooklyn. The malls are both located directly across Atlantic Avenue from Barclays Center arena, in the neighborhood of Pacific Park, which is being developed by Forest City Ratner.

Atlantic Terminal is located across the street from the Atlantic Center Mall, connected via a small enclosed bridge from Target, and both are under the same management of Madison International Realty. Atlantic Terminal is also an office building and part of the ticket office of the Long Island Rail Road's Atlantic Terminal. Parts of Atlantic Center Mall were also renovated to complement the new mall.

== History ==
In the 1950s, the land was to be the site of a domed baseball stadium proposed by then Brooklyn Dodgers owner Walter O'Malley. However, the plan fell through, and the Dodgers moved to Los Angeles in 1958.

On December 22, 2017, Atlantic Terminal and Atlantic Center was acquired by Madison International Realty from Forest City Realty Trust. The real estate private equity firm had previously acquired a 49% stake in the Forest City portfolio in 2011 and purchased the remaining 51% in 2017 to make Madison International Realty one of the largest retail landlords in New York.

== Floors ==
Atlantic Terminal has five floors. The lower levels consist of the LIRR and New York City Subway stations (technically in the basement). Upper floors feature anchor stores like Bath & Body Works, Chuck E. Cheese, DSW, Sephora, Uniqlo, and most notably Target. The store uses the urban Target layout and has two floors within the mall. It utilizes escalators, elevators and a shopping cart conveyor, design elements that are replicated at other urban locations in New York City and elsewhere. Target, along with the Chuck E Cheese and Buffalo Wild Wings in the mall are described as being the busiest locations for each company in the United States. Two Starbucks locations are sited on the property, one located inside Target while the other is in the ticket office area of the LIRR Atlantic Terminal.

Atlantic Center has 3 retail levels and 2 underground parking levels, with Stop and Shop and Old Navy on the first floor; Best Buy, Marshalls, and the New York State Department of Motor Vehicles on the second floor in addition to a few smaller retail outlets; and a Burlington Coat Factory and Dave & Busters on the third floor.

== See also ==
- Urban renewal
