= Ron Kuby =

American lawyer (born 1956)

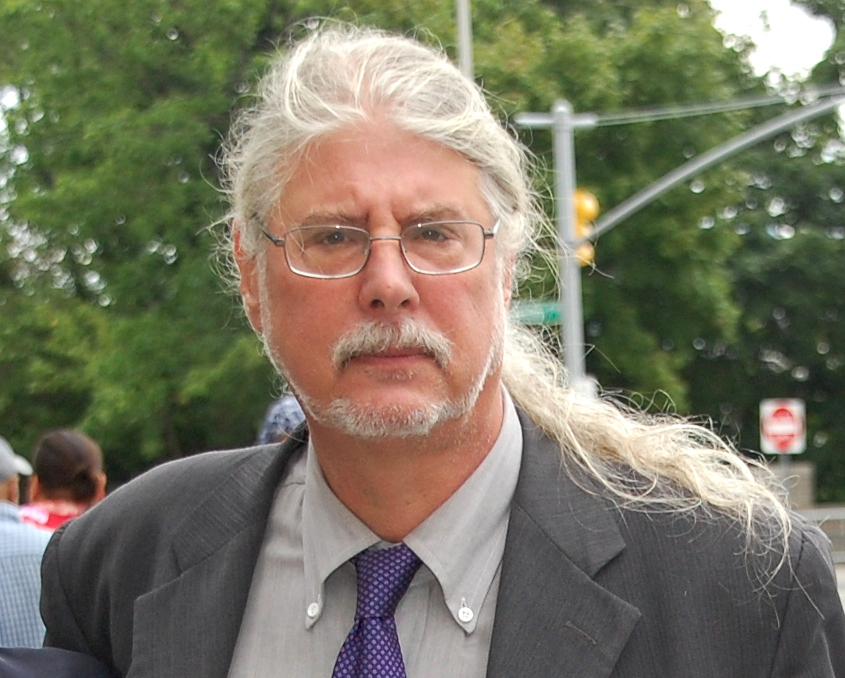
- Kuby in 2014
- Born: July 31, 1956 (age 70); Cleveland, Ohio, U.S.
- Education: University of Kansas (BA); Cornell University (JD)
- Occupations: Trial attorney, radio talk show host, television commentator
- Spouse: Marilyn Vasta (m. 2006)

Ronald L. Kuby (born July 31, 1956) is an American criminal defense and civil rights attorney. Kuby is also a radio talk show host, and television commentator. He has hosted radio programs on WABC (AM) in New York City and Air America radio.

Kuby has defended many high-profile criminal cases, ever since his early career as a colleague of the activist attorney William Kunstler. Kuby leads the Law Office of Ronald L. Kuby in Manhattan.

== Early life and education ==
Kuby was born in Cleveland, Ohio, the son of Ruth Miller, a secretary, and Donald Kuby, a salesman. His mother was from a Jewish family and his father, who died in 1990, was a Franciscan friar who converted to Judaism and became a militant Zionist before becoming Christian again. Kuby's parents divorced when he was five years old, after which he lived with his mother and grandparents. At 13, he joined the Jewish Defense League under the influence of his father, who was a follower of Meir David Kahane. As a teenager, Kuby emigrated to Israel, but returned to the U.S. after being disillusioned by what he describes as "anti-Arab racism".

He returned to Cleveland and lived in a commune for the next several years. In 1973, he briefly attended an accredited alternative high school. After graduating, he attended Cleveland State University for one year.

Kuby dropped out of college in 1974 and moved to St. Croix, in the U.S. Virgin Islands, where he worked on a tugboat and developed an interest in West Indian ethnobotany and medicinal plants. He moved briefly to Maine, then to Kansas in 1975, where he completed his degrees in cultural anthropology and history at the University of Kansas. Kuby was a free-speech and anti-apartheid activist while at KU, where he graduated with highest distinction, had a 4.0 average, and conducted and published original fieldwork, including the 1979 "Folk medicine on St. Croix: an ethnobotanical study", after returning to St. Croix several times. Kuby alleged the University of Kansas police intentionally broke his arm when they responded to an anti-apartheid protest during a commencement ceremony. Protesters were urging the KU Endowment Association to divest itself of investments in companies doing business in South Africa.

Kuby earned his Juris Doctor from Cornell Law School in 1983. Kuby said his grades entitled him to a position on the prestigious Cornell Law Review, but he declined the invitation. He also said to have graduated as one of the top students in his class.

== Personal life ==
On January 23, 2006, Kuby married Marilyn Vasta, a psychotherapist and climate activist, on the 20th anniversary of their first date. They have one daughter, Emma Vasta-Kuby, who is a lawyer with the D.C.-based Second Look Project, working on de-incarceration.

== Partnership with William Kunstler ==
While in college, Kuby interned with William Kunstler, a senior lawyer with 20 years' experience, notable for many high-profile cases, including the defense of the Chicago Eight in their 1969-70 trial. From 1983 until Kunstler's death in 1995, Kuby worked as an unofficial partner in Kunstler's law firm, with both men taking up "the fight for the poor, the oppressed and the downtrodden". The two men declared they were not only colleagues, but best friends as well.

Kunstler and Kuby never formalized a partnership with a contract or tax filings. Despite a letterhead that read "Kunstler and Kuby", Kuby was paid as an employee and never shared in the firm's profits and losses. On this basis, Kuby was denied ownership rights to the firm's case files, accounts, and name after Kunstler died, and Kunstler's widow, Margaret Ratner, put her late husband's archives under lock and key. Kuby filed a complaint against her with the attorney disciplinary committee; the committee dismissed the complaint in August 1996. In December 1996, a court case brought by Ratner to restrain Kuby from using the name "Kunstler & Kuby" resulted in Kuby's being denied any rights in the Kunstler firm.

== Notable cases ==
[Kuby] was, nonetheless, every prosecutor's worst nightmare; a defense attorney who could charm and incite a jury, and bully most any witness. Not to mention his gift for making cops look like liars and fools. It was Kuby who had fought to keep the courtroom open, a guerilla tactic ...

— David Kocieniewski

=== With Kunstler ===
Kuby, with Kunstler, represented many high-profile defendants:

Tom Manning and Richard Williams, who would be convicted for killing New Jersey State Trooper Philip J. Lamonaco on December 21, 1981.

Gregory Lee Johnson, a protester who burned a U.S. Flag at the 1984 Republican National Convention.

Sheikh Omar Abdel-Rahman, the blind cleric who headed the Egyptian-based militant group Al-Gama'a al-Islamiyya, accused of planning and encouraging terrorist attacks against Americans.

Colin Ferguson, the man responsible for the 1993 Long Island Rail Road shooting (who chose to represent himself at trial).

Nico Minardos, the Hollywood TV and movie actor, accused in an FBI sting operation of conspiracy to ship arms to Iran.

Qubilah Shabazz, the daughter of Malcolm X, accused of plotting to murder Louis Farrakhan of the Nation of Islam.

Glenn Harris, a New York City public school teacher who absconded with a 15-year-old girl for two months.

Yu Kikumura, a member of the Japanese Red Army, and associate of the Gambino Crime Family.

During the Gulf War, Kunstler and Kuby represented American soldiers claiming conscientious objector status. They also represented El Sayyid Nosair, assassin of the rabbi Meir Kahane whom Kuby's father had admired, and the leftist radical turned health-care activist Dr. Alan Berkman.

=== After Kunstler's death ===
After Kunstler's death, Kuby continued the work of his late mentor. In 1996, he won a judgment of $43 million for Darrell Cabey, a severely injured victim of "Subway Vigilante" Bernhard Goetz's 1984 shooting of four Black teenagers in New York City. Kuby also won nearly a million dollars for members of the Hells Angels motorcycle club who were wrongfully arrested by the New York City Police Department. He secured a reversal of a murder conviction for a mentally ill homeless man whose candle accidentally caused the death of a firefighter. Kuby represented the appeal of Yusef Salaam, whose conviction in the 1989 Central Park jogger case was overturned in 2002, and who went on to be elected to the New York City Council. In 2005, Kuby won close to a million dollars for another wrongfully convicted man who spent eight years in prison.

In 2006, Kuby was subpoenaed by the defense to testify at the second trial of John A. Gotti, the son of Gambino crime family leader John Gotti, which included charges for the kidnapping and attempted murder of Curtis Sliwa, Kuby's talk radio co-host at the time. Kuby testified that in a 1998 conversation, Gotti said he had wanted to leave organized crime. "He told me he was sick of this life", Kuby told the court. "He wanted to rejoin his family and be done with this." Sliwa reacted angrily to his longtime co-host's testimony for the defense, calling him a "Judas", though Kuby was following the law by answering a subpoena to testify.

In April 2009, Kuby spoke about the capture of Abduwali Muse, a Somali teenager apprehended during the rescue of Richard Phillips, the Captain of the MV Maersk Alabama, a freighter briefly captured by Somali pirates. Kuby said he was discussing organizing a team to defend Muse, suggesting he was invalidly captured while immunized by a flag of truce. In September 2009, Kuby appeared on behalf of Ahmad Wais Afzali, an imam facing multiple charges in a terrorism-related case. Afzali had told Najibullah Zazi that authorities were asking questions about him. Kuby won Afzali's release on bail and negotiated a plea bargain to a reduced charge of lying to agents, with deportation in lieu of imprisonment.

In 2010, Kuby defended Raphael Golb, the son of a biblical scholar. Golb had sent emails wherein he impersonated critics of his father and falsely admitted committing various defamatory acts, including academic fraud; he was arrested in 2009. Charged with multiple felonies and misdemeanors, Golb was convicted at trial and appealed to New York's Supreme Court, which affirmed the charges. Golb then appealed to the New York Court of Appeals, the highest court in New York State. They dismissed some of Golb's convictions, such as identify theft and aggravated harassment (striking down the latter as unconstitutionally vague and overbroad), but they upheld others, including criminal impersonation and forgery.

Starting in 2000, Kuby began working to exonerate innocent prisoners in non-DNA cases. He won the 2001 release (followed by a combined $3.3 million judgment) for Anthony Faison and Charles Shepherd, who served close to 14 years for a murder they did not commit. The actual killer was subsequently caught and plead guilty. In 2008, Kuby exonerated Michael Clancy, an elevator mechanic wrongfully convicted of murder in the Bronx. Clancy served 13 years. The actual killer was subsequently indicted, having been named by a federal informant, but was not prosecuted successfully due to the Bronx DA's wrongful conviction of Clancy.

In 2013, Kuby won the exoneration of Thomas Green, serving 35 years for child sexual assault and rape. All of the prosecution's evidence was proved to be false, and Green was released after five years. His time in the prison system left him with undiagnosed and untreated cancer; he died two weeks after his release. Also in 2013, Kuby took on the case of Johnny Hincapie, wrongfully convicted in the infamous Brian Watkins subway murder case. After 25 years in prison, Hincapie was exonerated.

In 2015, Kuby secured the exoneration of Shabaka Shakur, who served 27 years of a 40 to life sentence for two murders that he did not commit. Shakur began his case pro se in 2012, and Kuby agreed to represent him pro bono later that year. The evidence against Shakur consisted largely of an uncorroborated confession allegedly given to NYPD Detective Louis Scarcella. Kuby had faced Scarcella in 1996 in the high-profile "Money Train" case. Scarcella's testimony in that case led Kuby to believe that the much-decorated detective perjured himself and suborned perjury through witness manipulation. The judge who exonerated Shakur found there was a reasonable likelihood that Scarcella had fabricated the confession.

Exonerations in two other Scarcella cases quickly followed, based upon Scarcella's misconduct. Jabbar Washington was freed in July 2017 after 20 years in prison, as a result of a joint investigation with Kuby and the Brooklyn DA's Conviction Review Unit. Sundhe Moses, who spent almost 20 years in prison for another high-profile murder, was exonerated after extensive hearings concluded in January 2018. On July 15, 2022, one of Scarcella's biggest cases, the "Money Train" murder, was overturned and charges dismissed against three men, Thomas Malik, Vincent Ellerbe, and James Irons, all of whom served over two decades in prison. The exonerations were the culmination of almost ten years of re-investigation by Kuby and the Brooklyn District Attorney's Conviction Review Unit (CRU).

In October 2020, Kuby and the CRU exonerated another innocent man, Gerard Domond, who spent 27 years behind bars due to the prosecution's withholding of crucial exculpatory evidence. In January 2023, a Brooklyn judge vacated a murder conviction against Kareem Mayo, who had served 23 years of a 25 to life sentence, along with his cousin, Donnell Perkins (represented by Joel Rudin). The decision followed six months of hearings on newly discovered evidence.

In keeping with Kunstler's tradition of representing political defendants, often subjected to show trials, Kuby and associate Rhiya Trivedi represented Patricia Okoumou, who famously climbed the Statue of Liberty on July 4, 2018, protesting the family separation policy of the Trump Administration. Kuby and Trivedi also represented the environmental lawyer Steven Donziger in his 2021 trial for criminal contempt for failing to turn over sensitive materials to the Chevron Corporation.

== Radio and television personality ==
From 1999 to 2007, Kuby and Curtis Sliwa co-hosted a daily radio show titled Curtis and Kuby in the Morning on WABC (AM), in New York City. After an eight-year run, WABC replaced the show with Don Imus and retained Sliwa. Kuby and Sliwa then shared a short-lived midday television program on MSNBC. Kuby began broadcasting on Air America Radio in 2008, at first as a replacement for Randi Rhodes, then later with a regular show, Doing Time with Ron Kuby. In May 2009 Air America moved Kuby's show to a new time slot, which took him off of the schedule for many affiliates. By June, his show was removed from Air America's schedule.

On January 2, 2014, Curtis and Kuby returned to WABC in the 12–3pm (Eastern) timeslot. He was released from WABC in late May 2017 for budgetary reasons.

Kuby is a frequent pundit and substitute anchor on Court TV and has appeared several times on the Discovery Channel program Oddities, offering legal advice.

On May 16, 2008, Kuby was interviewed on the WBGO program Conversations with Allan Wolper. He discussed how the news media sometimes convict criminal suspects in the court of public opinion.

Unlike defense lawyers who usually suppress specifics about their residence, family, and habits, Kuby agreed in 2012 to be featured in the weekly New York Times "Sunday Routine" photo report on prominent or colorful New Yorkers.

Kuby was featured in the 2019 podcast The Ballad of Billy Balls, which dealt with the murder of William Heitzman at the hands of the NYPD in June 1982.

== Pop culture references ==
- In the film The Big Lebowski (1998), Jeff "The Dude" Lebowski (played by Jeff Bridges) demands representation either by Kuby or Bill Kunstler during the Malibu Police Station scene.
