= Louis Scarcella =

American homicide detective with many overturned cases

Louis N. Scarcella
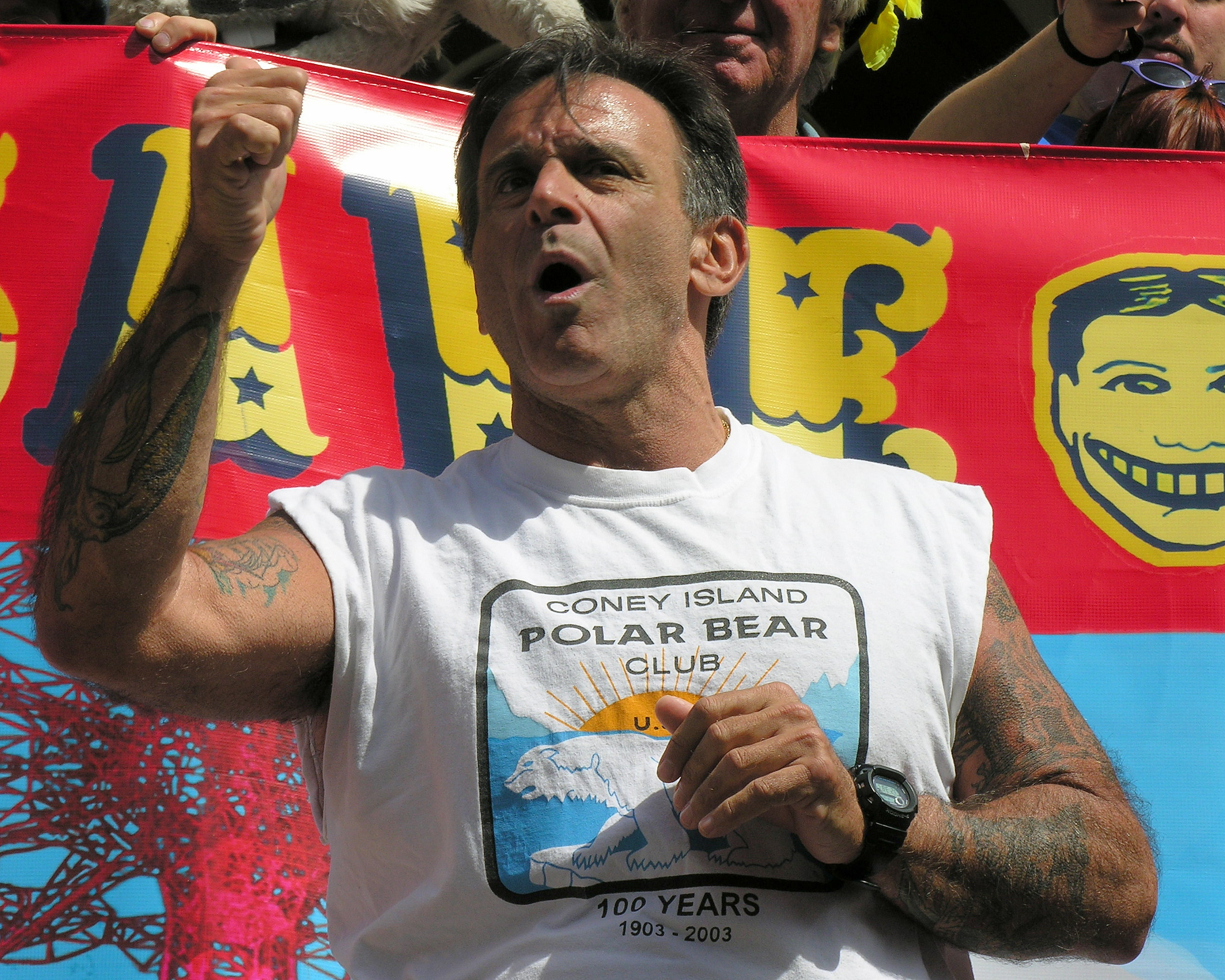
- Scarcella in retirement (2007)
- Born: 1951 (age 75)
- Occupation: Detective
- Years active: 1973–1999
- Employer: New York City Police Department
- Known for: 21 overturned convictions in homicide cases
- Awards: 4 Chief of Detectives' Awards for Outstanding Investigation

Louis N. Scarcella (skar-SELL-uh, born 1951) (Note: The New York Times reporter who won a Polk Award for her Scarcella investigations published his age as 61 in May 2013, and 72 in November 2023. This is only possible if Scarcella was born between May and November 1951.) is a retired detective from the New York City Police Department (NYPD) who earned frequent commendations during the "crack epidemic" of the 1980s and 1990s, before many convictions resulting from his investigations were overturned during his retirement. As a member of the Brooklyn North Homicide Squad, he and his longtime partner Stephen Chmil built a reputation for obtaining convictions in difficult cases. Since 2013, Scarcella has received extensive and sustained publicity for multiple allegations of investigative misconduct that resulted in false testimony against crime suspects, leading to innocent parties serving long prison terms and guilty individuals going free.

As of June 2025, at least 21 people have had their convictions vacated in Scarcella's homicide cases, after more than 420 combined years of imprisonment, (Note: At least 424 years of imprisonment (for at least 21 vacated convictions): 5 years (Pondexter) + 23 (Ranta) + 13 (Austin) + 20 (Jennette) + 27 (Hill) + 17 (Logan) + 20 (Hamilton) + 9 (Davis) + 27 (Shakur) + 24 (Hargrave) + 16 (Bunn) + 10 (Gathers) + 21 (Washington) + 18 (Moses) + 24 (Williams) + 24 (DeLeon, later reconvicted) + 33 (Edmonson, partially reconvicted) + 25 (Ellerbe) + 27 (Irons) + 27 (Malik) + 14 (Ruffin).) as the Kings County District Attorney's Office (Brooklyn DA) continued to review many of the detective's estimated 200 homicide investigations. Prosecutors or judges have explicitly cited evidence of his improper conduct, in criminal cases involving at least 12 wrongfully convicted defendants, (Note: At least 12 cases citing Scarcella's misconduct: Jenkins, Ranta, Shakur, Hargrave, Bunn, Washington, Moses, DeLeon, Edmonson, Ellerbe, Irons, Malik.) and legal settlements to 17 defendants have reached approximately $150 million of taxpayer funds. (Note: Approximately $148.1 million in settlements (to 17 defendants): 8.4 (Ranta) + 5.5 (Austin) + 8.7 (Jennette) + 11.0 (Hill) + 6.73 (Logan) + 10.75 (Hamilton) + 0.75 (Davis) + 8.3 (Shakur) + 11.2 (Hargrave) + 5.9 (Bunn) + 3.9 (Gathers) + 7.4 (Washington) + 7.2 (Moses) + 10.5 (Williams) + 9.25 (Ellerbe) + 16.3 (Irons) + 16.3 (Malik)) Of the 21 defendants with overturned convictions, only two have been reconvicted. Nevertheless, Scarcella has consistently denied wrongdoing, while qualified immunity and the statute of limitations have protected him from possible legal consequences.

== Biography and family ==
Louis Scarcella grew up in an Italian-American family living in the Bensonhurst neighborhood of Brooklyn, New York. His father, Domenick, was an NYPD homicide detective in Manhattan. Scarcella studied at Midwood High School, then served for three years in the US Navy during the Vietnam War. Upon returning to New York City, he entered the police academy, graduating in 1973. His younger brother, Michael, also joined the NYPD, serving until his death by suicide in 2014. Louis transferred into the newly created Brooklyn North Homicide Squad in 1987, and retired in 1999. His daughter, Jacqueline Scarcella, became a prosecutor in the Brooklyn District Attorney's Office. His uncle, Nicholas "Nicky Black" Grancio, was the victim of a Brooklyn homicide that police attributed to a leadership struggle within the Colombo crime family, after he previously avoided arrest for a murder that Scarcella was questionably assigned to investigate. Scarcella is a longtime resident of Great Kills, Staten Island, and a former president of the Coney Island Polar Bear Club for winter swimming.

== Allegations of investigative misconduct ==
Under the spotlight of a high-profile New York Times investigation that went on to win a George Polk Award for Justice Reporting, Brooklyn District Attorney Charles J. Hynes in 2013 reopened the cases of 56 people arrested by Scarcella. At least another five cases of his partner Chmil were deemed "probably wrongful" by the nonprofit Exoneration Initiative of the Innocence Network, citing "the same pattern of cajoled and inconsistent witnesses". The New York Daily News later described the "swaggering" Scarcella's "shady investigations involving tainted evidence, misleading testimony or forced confessions". The Times found that at least six murder cases relied on the same crack-addicted witness, at least five disputed confessions started with the same wording frequently used in Scarcella's own storytelling, and at least six disputed confessions lacked the standard recordings or interview notes for supporting documentation. In one of several front-page articles that year, the Times warned how Scarcella's flawed work "raises the prospect that innocent people may be serving life sentences for crimes they did not commit, or that guilty people whose cases were compromised could go free."

As of June 2025, itemized in a section below, at least 21 Scarcella-related convictions have been vacated after more than 420 years of imprisonment and family separation. The resulting monetary settlements have reached approximately $150 million to 17 defendants. (The settlement totals have been confirmed by New York government officials.) Three of the overturned convictions were featured in the documentary series Brooklyn North: Guilty Until Proven Innocent, a best-selling podcast in 2020.

=== James Jenkins (identification disallowed 1987) ===
Courts have faulted Scarcella's professional conduct since at least 1983, when he answered "I don't remember" so often that a judge declared him less credible than an accused rapist. In 1987, the first year of the Brooklyn North Homicide Squad, a different judge actually disallowed the identification of murder suspect James Jenkins at trial because of Scarcella's misleading photo presentation. The detective showed a single photograph to a group of multiple witnesses in conversation together, telling them: "We have the guy who committed the murder." Justice Francis X. Egitto called this identification procedure "a classic illustration of what not to do."

=== Jeffrey Campbell (charge dropped 1985) and Valance Cole (judged "probably innocent" 2003) ===
According to attorney Michael Baum, drug addict Jeffrey Campbell was pressured by detectives to testify against a murder suspect in 1985, or else they would set up Campbell on a phony charge. A few months later, Campbell was arrested for robbing a shoe salesman, who told Baum that the police had coerced him into falsely identifying Campbell. The salesman later refused to testify, and the robbery charge against Campbell was dropped.

Valance Cole's conviction for a later 1985 homicide was based partly on the testimony of Campbell, after the addict was arrested again. "In 1994, Mr. Campbell, dying of AIDS, suddenly recanted. He said prosecutors had promised to drop charges if he falsely blamed Mr. Cole for the murder. Detective Chmil, he said in a sworn statement, gave him a script." Campbell's recantation was not judged sufficiently credible and Cole stayed in prison. A decade later in 2003, a different judge declared that Cole was "probably innocent", but refused to overturn his conviction because Cole failed to meet the legal standard of "clear and convincing evidence". A different suspect was later implicated by his own confessions and multiple eyewitnesses, but under Hynes the Brooklyn DA's Office rejected them as insufficiently reliable to exonerate Cole.

=== Theresa Capra, Lennel George, and Kathy Pelles (school investigation overturned 2007) ===
After Scarcella's retirement from the NYPD in 1999, he led a city investigation of public-school officials accused of inflating student scores on state-wide Regents exams in 2002 and 2003. At Brooklyn's Cobble Hill School of American Studies, Scarcella's investigation triggered the resignation of assistant principal Theresa Capra, the removal of principal Lennel George, and the reprimand of superintendent Kathy Pelles. Then in 2007, an extensive review by the special commissioner of investigation for New York City schools concluded that Scarcella's work was deeply flawed, biased, and overly influenced by one disgruntled teacher who falsely accused Capra of directing a cheating scheme with "no credible evidence". Capra's employment was re-authorized, George was appointed principal of another high school, Pelles's reprimand was rescinded, and the accusing teacher Philip Nobile was removed. Scarcella resigned as a school investigator, and his supervisor was demoted.

=== Teresa Gomez (witness in six murder cases, judged "extremely problematic" in 2014) ===
Teresa Gomez served as Scarcella's "key witness" in six separate murder cases during the 1980s and 1990s. Describing Gomez as "a junkie prostitute", GQ reported that Scarcella first met Gomez plying her trade in an apartment that he had been canvassing, subsequently taking her to the stationhouse and debriefing her on several cases. Scarcella would later testify that he did not recall how he first met Gomez. Even so, the detective found her credible after she gave "good information" on two homicides in the 1980s, given how "her living in a crackhouse in Crown Heights put her in close proximity to scores of murders each year." Scarcella later praised Gomez as "a very intelligent girl who spoke three languages." He would ultimately use her court testimony to land five murder convictions. Joe Ponzi, former chief of investigations for the Brooklyn DA, worked with Gomez in 1987 for the second murder trial of Robert Hill. Of the case, he stated, "I interviewed her and might have even polygraphed her... I found her to be credible, and that case resulted in a conviction."

Neil Ross, a New York judge and former prosecutor, wrote in 2000 that Gomez "was ravaged from head to toe by the scourge of crack cocaine... It was near folly to even think that anyone would believe Gomez about anything, let alone the fact that she witnessed the same guy kill two different people." According to the award-winning investigation by The New York Times in 2013, she "seemed to have a knack for witnessing homicides Mr. Scarcella was assigned to", until her own death in a hit-and-run accident. Finally in 2014, a prosecutor from the Kings County Conviction Review Unit described her in court as "hopelessly addicted to drugs, criminal in her conduct for the most part, increasingly erratic in terms of her accounts", and an "extremely problematic" witness. Nonetheless, Gomez's testimony was originally presented to juries by prosecutors and deemed credible on numerous occasions, before most of the resulting convictions were overturned years later.

== District Attorney review panels (2011 to date) ==
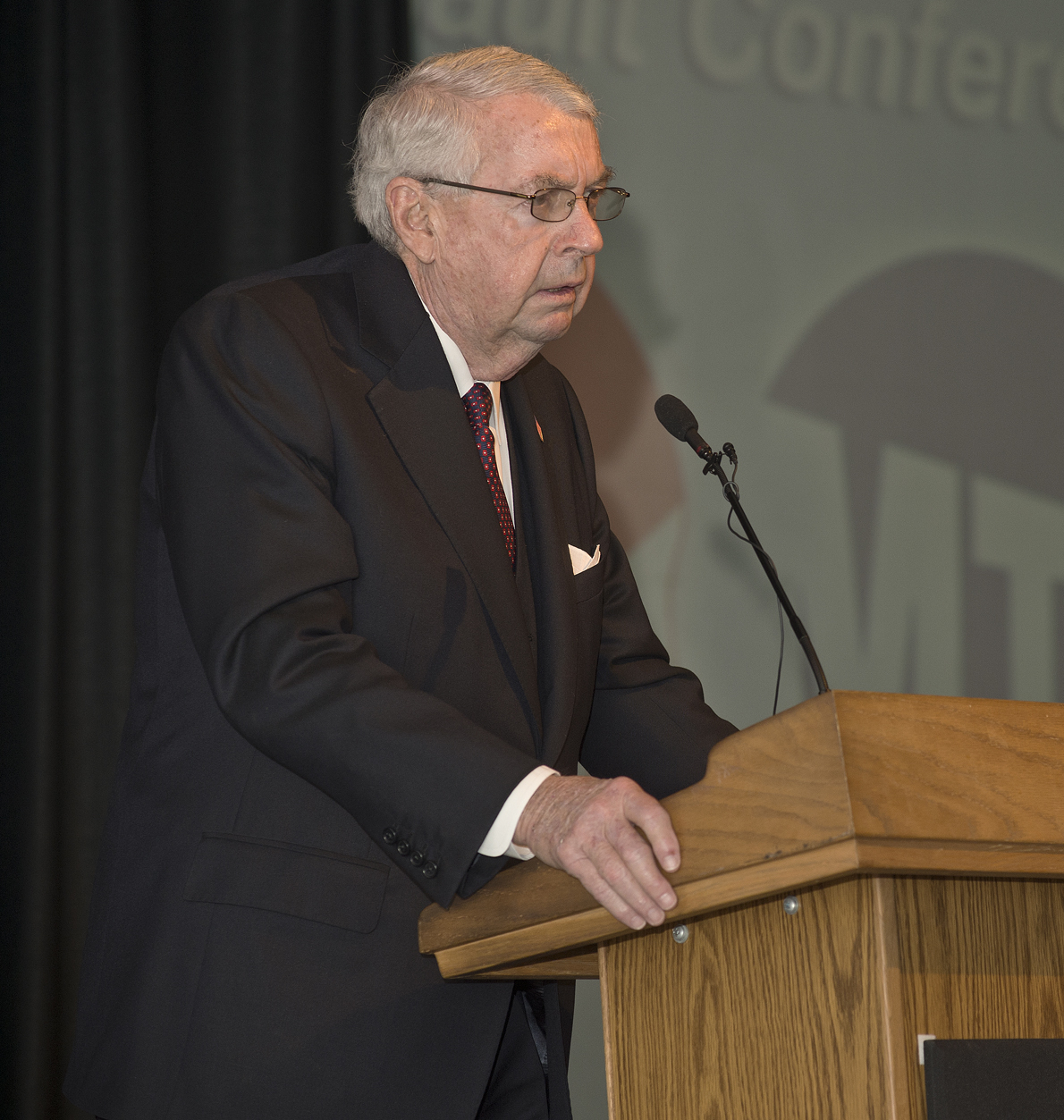
Charles "Joe" Hynes,
District Attorney 1990–2013
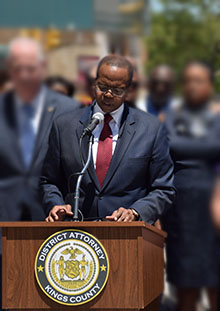
Ken Thompson,
District Attorney 2014–2016
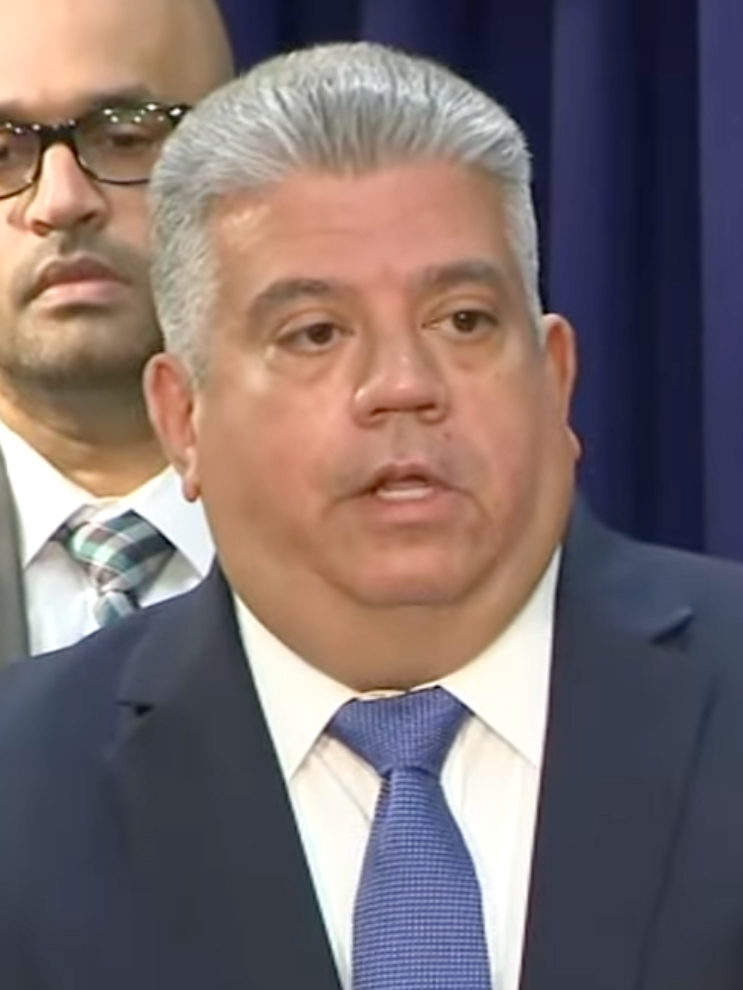
Eric Gonzalez,
District Attorney 2016–

Charles "Joe" Hynes created a small "Conviction Integrity Unit" at the Brooklyn DA's Office in 2011, toward the end of his 24-year tenure as district attorney (1990–2013), as forensic DNA analysis was improving. While the implementation of this unit was one step forward in investigating wrongful conviction cases, Hynes was "sharply criticized for moving too slowly, defending prosecutors accused of misconduct, and clinging to convictions even after they were discredited."

In July 2013, after Scarcella's first prominent overturned conviction and the resulting New York Times investigation, Hynes appointed an "independent" advisory panel to review approximately 50 problematic Scarcella cases. Hynes's effort was met with skepticism, as he stocked the panel with close friends and campaign donors, and he continued to employ Scarcella's daughter as a prosecutor. Exoneration advocate Jeffrey Deskovic criticized: "Relying on the DA to do the investigation is like asking the fox to guard the henhouse." The Legal Aid Society, which represented defendants in 20 of the reopened cases, also raised concerns that the review was too narrow, because it was limited to cases in which Scarcella had testified in court. In Hynes's sixth re-election bid, at age 78 in November 2013, he lost by nearly 50 points to former federal prosecutor Kenneth P. Thompson, who had expressed a willingness to widen the scope of the review.

In 2014, Thompson renamed the Conviction Integrity Unit as the Conviction Review Unit, stating: "I thought the process in place did not have integrity." He also replaced the members of the panel reviewing Scarcella's cases. In January 2015, Thompson announced that his office would stand by 21 convictions that had been questioned (18 involving Scarcella), after asking judges to vacate 10 convictions (4 involving Scarcella), with another 90 convictions still under review (71 involving Scarcella). After Thompson died of cancer in 2016, the reviews continued under his chief assistant and successor, Eric Gonzalez. Hundreds of convictions were dismissed in cases that relied on the testimony of former police officers criminally charged with "misconduct that directly related to their job duties" – but this bulk category did not include Scarcella or other officers from his era, beyond the statute of limitations for criminal charges.

== Vacated convictions ==
The following 21 people have had their convictions vacated in Scarcella-related homicide cases.

=== Ronald Pondexter (1996) ===
Ronald Pondexter was convicted and sentenced to 25 years to life for a 1992 murder-robbery. Scarcella produced a supposed eyewitness, teen-aged Sharon Valdez. "After testifying, though, Valdez called Pondexter's lawyer, Michael Baum, and said she had lied. Scarcella, she claimed, said she would lose custody of her baby if she did not implicate Pondexter. Valdez's mother told Baum that Valdez had been asleep during the 3 a.m. shooting." In June 1996, the New York Court of Appeals reversed the conviction because of the recanted testimony. Pondexter was granted a new trial and was acquitted in 1997 after serving five years.

=== David Ranta (2013) ===
David Ranta, charged for the 1990 carjacking murder of a prominent rabbi, had his conviction overturned on March 21, 2013, after serving 23 years in prison. He received a $6.4 million settlement from the City of New York and $2 million from the state. During the original murder investigation, five witnesses identified Ranta as the shooter. Decades later, however, the Brooklyn DA's Conviction Integrity Unit began reviewing Ranta's case when a key witness, aged 13 during the original investigation, revealed that Detective Scarcella had provided him with a description of whom to pick in a police lineup ("the guy with the big nose"). The original case also relied heavily on the testimonies of Alan Bloom and Dmitry Drikman, who soon were imprisoned together on various felony charges. During the review of Ranta's case, Scarcella and his partner Chmil were shown to have permitted both Bloom and Drikman to leave jail, smoke crack, and have sex with prostitutes, in exchange for their incriminating testimonies against Ranta. Drikman and his girlfriend recanted their testimonies; Bloom failed a lie-detector test and had since died. No physical evidence incriminated Ranta in the case, and Scarcella minimized attention on a leading suspect accused by his own widow and another informant. The detectives received reprimands for the improper furlough of their jailhouse informants.

Ranta's vacated conviction in 2013 was the first of many prominently connected to Scarcella, and District Attorney Hynes said explicitly that the Ranta review "uncovered some questionable conduct by former NYPD Detective Scarcella." In a later court hearing, after public allegations of witness tampering, the detective defended his work on the Ranta case and blamed Hynes instead: "Mr. Hynes was completely wrong. He was throwing me under the bus; he lied." Scarcella's attorneys later described those accusations against him as the start of an unfair "domino effect" that would increasingly hurt his credibility in other challenged cases.

=== Darryl Austin, Alvena Jennette, and Robert Hill (2014) ===
In 2014, three half-brothers, Darryl Austin, Alvena Jennette, and Robert Hill, were all exonerated of second-degree murder convictions. Austin had died in prison in 2000 after serving 13 years of his 18-to-life sentence for the 1985 murder of Ronnie Durant. Receiving an identical sentence, as Austin's co-defendant, Jennette had spent more than 20 years incarcerated before parole in 2007. At the time of exoneration, Hill was still in prison, acquitted of a 1986 murder but serving 27 years of an 18-to-life sentence for the 1987 murder of Donald Manboardes in Crown Heights, Brooklyn. All three convictions (and the failed 1986 case) were heavily dependent on problematic witness Teresa Gomez, a crack addict who testified in at least six Scarcella cases. Gomez's testimonies were found to be contradictory to physical evidence and to other witness accounts, which favored the three brothers but were unlawfully withheld from their defense attorneys. In vacating and dismissing the charges against the brothers, Brooklyn District Attorney Kenneth P. Thompson highlighted that the reliance on Gomez's testimony "undermined the integrity of these convictions, and resulted in an unfair trial for each of these defendants." The city and state paid settlements of $5.5 million to the estate of Austin, $8.7 million to Jennette, and $11.0 million to Hill.

=== Roger Logan (2014) ===
Roger Logan was convicted and sentenced to 25 years to life for the 1997 murder of Sherwin Gibbons. After serving nearly 17 years, Logan was freed in 2014 at the request of Brooklyn District Attorney Thompson and his Conviction Review Unit, when they determined that Detective Scarcella's purported eyewitness Aisha Jones was in police custody on the day of the murder and never saw the events to which she testified after an improper lineup. Logan received $6.73 million in settlements from the city and state.

=== Derrick Hamilton (2015) ===
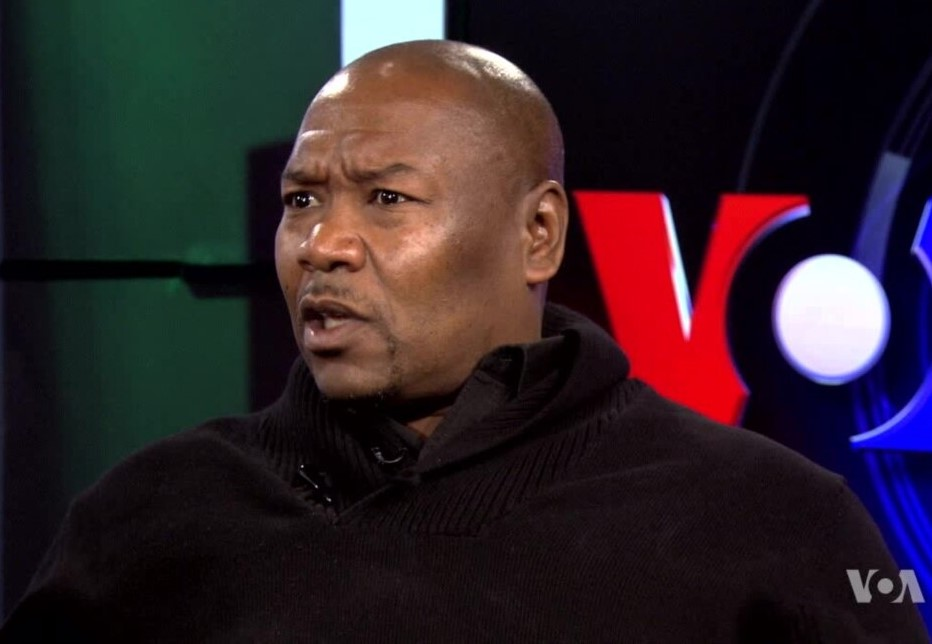
Derrick Hamilton, interview with Voice of America (2016)

Derrick Hamilton was wrongfully convicted in 1992 for the murder of Nathaniel Cash the previous year. Hamilton reported that during a police interrogation, Scarcella told him that "he didn't care whether I did it or not, because I didn't serve enough time for my previous case, and I would be going back to jail." An alibi placed Hamilton in New Haven, Connecticut, at the time of the murder in Brooklyn. The only alleged eyewitness to the crime, Cash's girlfriend, Jewel Smith, signed a statement stating that Hamilton "was not there when Mr. Cash was shot." However, at the trial, Smith testified that she had seen Hamilton kill Cash, and the New Haven alibi witnesses were not present to testify. Smith soon told a private investigator that she lied in court because Scarcella had threatened to jail her for a parole violation and take her children. Scarcella denied the accusations, Hamilton was sentenced to 25 years to life, and the judge refused to allow belated testimony from the alibi witnesses.

Hamilton spent his time in prison studying criminal law, eventually becoming, according to The New Yorker, "one of the most skilled jailhouse lawyers in the country." Based on persuasive evidence of innocence, he won the release of a fellow murder convict in 1997, won his own release on parole in 2011 after 20 years, became a paralegal for one of his past attorneys, and helped prompt the sweeping official review of Scarcella's cases in 2013. Hamilton won a landmark case in 2014, People v. Hamilton, when the Appellate Division of the New York State Supreme Court ruled that a convicted criminal with a plausible claim of innocence is entitled to an evidentiary hearing, and that clear and convincing evidence will overturn the conviction. On January 9, 2015, Hamilton was finally exonerated, with the prosecutor, Mark Hale, declaring that Smith had been "unreliable, untruthful, and incredible in her testimony." Hamilton received a $7 million settlement from the cities of New York and New Haven, and $3.75 million from New York state. Having befriended Shabaka Shakur in the Auburn Correctional Facility, after their release the two men used some of their settlement money to open a Downtown Brooklyn restaurant called Brownstone, and to help other wrongfully convicted inmates. Shakur said: "Almost every Scarcella victim has been to the restaurant at least once."

=== Carlos Davis (2015) ===
Carlos Davis was arrested by Scarcella and his partner in 1988 for the murder of 19-year-old Norris Williams in East New York. At trial, a single witness testified to seeing Davis shoot Williams shortly after midnight, while the witness was 825 feet (250 m) away. Although Davis was acquitted of the murder charge, he was sentenced to 7.5 to 15 years in prison for possession of a weapon. After serving almost 9 years, Davis was released on parole in 1997. He was not fully exonerated until April 2015, after the Conviction Review Unit found that the faraway eyewitness had given a false name, age, address, and was not credible. Davis received a $750,000 settlement from the city. According to the New York Post, he has found giving back to the community "therapeutic" following his release, and enjoys coaching youth sports.

=== Shabaka Shakur (2015) ===
Shabaka Shakur, originally named Louis Holmes, was wrongfully convicted in 1989 for the double murder of two former high-school classmates the previous year. Scarcella testified that Shakur confessed to killing the men after an argument about car payments. Shakur denied this, and his supposed confession did not include his signature or any recording or handwritten notes that would have been standard documentation procedure. He was sentenced to two consecutive 20-to-life sentences. Steadfast in his innocence, Shakur served 27 years in prison before Judge Desmond Green vacated his conviction in 2015, writing that there was "a reasonable probability that the alleged confession of defendant was indeed fabricated" and attributing to Scarcella "a propensity to embellish or fabricate statements". District Attorney Thompson agreed not to retry the case. The city and state paid a combined $9.1 million or $8.3 million in damages to Shakur (sources differ), who lamented the years and the parenthood possibilities that he lost due to his wrongful conviction.

=== Rosean Hargrave (2015) and John Bunn (2016) ===
John Bunn and Rosean Hargrave were wrongfully convicted for the 1991 shooting death of an off-duty correction officer, Rolando Neischer, in an apparent carjacking. Other leading suspects were dropped without explanation, and no guns, bullets, fingerprints, blood samples, or other physical evidence implicated either defendant. A surviving victim, the husband of a police officer, identified the teens in police lineups that Scarcella and his partner Chmil organized irregularly and then misrepresented in court. In a joint trial that lasted just one-and-a-half days, Bunn and Hargrave were convicted of murder at the ages of 14 and 17, respectively. Untested police evidence was quickly destroyed before the case could be appealed. Bunn's lawyer for the Conviction Integrity review observed: "This smacks of a cover-up, and it's really troubling."

In 2015 and 2016, after nearly 24 years served in prison by Hargrave and 16 by the paroled Bunn, Judge ShawnDya Simpson vacated their respective murder convictions based on Scarcella's engagement in "false and misleading practices". Simpson pointed to tainted evidence that had been collected by Scarcella, ruling that "the revelation of Detective Scarcella's malfeasance in fabricating false-identification evidence gravely undermines the evidence that convicted the defendants in this case." In April 2018, an appellate court upheld Simpson's decision, and the DA then opted not to retry the cases. Bunn has since started a program for troubled youth, "A Voice 4 the Unheard", and filed a lawsuit for "malicious prosecution, denial of due process, and civil rights conspiracy", which the city settled for $5.9 million in 2020. Hargrave received settlements of $6.7 million from the city and $4.5 million from the state.

=== Vanessa Gathers (2016) ===
Vanessa Gathers was wrongfully convicted of manslaughter in connection with the 1991 robbery, assault, and subsequent death of 71-year-old Michael Shaw in Crown Heights, Brooklyn. Gathers was approached by Scarcella on the street in 1992 "because she fit the description of one of the assailants". Five years later, Scarcella allegedly coerced a false confession from Gathers, the main evidence that led to her conviction in 1998. Gathers maintained her innocence throughout and beyond her 10 years of imprisonment and 5 years of parole. In February 2016, she became the first woman to be exonerated by the Conviction Review Unit. She received settlements of $1.5 million from the state and $2.4 million from the city.

=== Jabbar Washington (2017) ===
In 1997, Jabbar Washington was convicted and sentenced to 25 years to life in prison for the 1995 murder of Ronald Ellis in an armed robbery. The key evidence in the case was the eyewitness testimony of Lisa Todd, who had met with Scarcella and initially identified Washington in a lineup. A few days after the lineup, Todd clarified that she told Scarcella she recognized Washington as a former resident of her building, not as a participant in the murder. Although Todd's clarification was included in a grand-jury synopsis, the prosecutors withheld this information from Washington's defense attorney, and then misleadingly emphasized Todd's lineup identification of Washington in his trial. On July 12, 2017, after the reviewing prosecutors concluded that Scarcella had "intentionally and improperly" misrepresented the lineup identification, Washington's case was vacated and dismissed, at the joint request of his defense attorney Ron Kuby, the Conviction Review Unit, and Acting District Attorney Eric Gonzalez. Washington received compensation of $5.75 million from the city and $1.65 million from the state, for his 21 years in prison.

=== Sundhe Moses (2018) ===
Sundhe Moses was wrongfully convicted in 1997 of killing a four-year-old girl, Shamone Johnson, who was caught in the crossfire of a gang shooting in Brooklyn in 1995. At the time of his trial, Moses claimed that Scarcella had choked and hit him to coerce a (false) confession. A jury convicted Moses and he was sentenced to prison for 15 years to life; he ultimately served 18 years. In 2013, after the girl's cousin recanted his eyewitness identification of the shooter, Moses was released on parole. In January 2018, his conviction was overturned. Presiding Justice Dineen Riviezzo maintained that Scarcella's use of "improper tactics" to send individuals to prison could have been persuasive to the jury that convicted Moses if those allegations had come to light at the time of trial. A month later, the district attorney chose not to retry the case. Scarcella, meanwhile, "testified that he had minimal involvement with the investigation." Moses received settlements of $3.7 million from the city and $3.5 million from the state.

=== Shawn Williams (2018) ===
In 1994, teen-aged Shawn Williams was wrongfully convicted of murder, after Scarcella detained and allegedly coerced eyewitness Margaret Smith into falsely implicating him, based on her view from a sixth-floor window at midnight. Attorneys with Cleary Gottlieb and the Legal Aid Society took on the task of reviewing Williams' case after it was referred to them by the DA's Conviction Review Unit. During their investigation, Smith fully recanted her testimony, which was the basis of Williams' conviction. No forensic evidence or motive was provided in Williams' trial. Furthermore, Cleary and Legal Aid were able to find alibi evidence that placed Williams in Pennsylvania while the murder took place in New York. Twenty-four years after his conviction, on July 13, 2018, Brooklyn Supreme Court Justice Sharen Hudson ordered Williams' immediate release, as prosecutors joined a defense motion to set aside his conviction and vacate the original indictment. The city awarded him a $10.5 million settlement.

=== Eliseo DeLeon (2019, reconvicted 2022) ===
Teen-aged Eliseo DeLeon was convicted and sentenced to 25 years to life for the 1995 murder of Fausto Cordero during an attempted robbery. DeLeon maintained that his confession was fabricated by Scarcella. In 2019, after DeLeon served nearly 24 years of his sentence, Brooklyn Supreme Court Justice Dena Douglas freed him and vacated his conviction, stating: "This court does not find the testimony of the detective to be credible. Detectives Scarcella and Chmil demonstrated a disregard for the law that greatly troubles this court." An appeals panel of judges agreed in 2021, ruling: "Based on Scarcella's and Chmil's significant involvement in the case, newly discovered evidence of their misconduct would have furnished the jury with a different context."

With two eyewitnesses to the murder, the Brooklyn DA prosecuted a retrial of DeLeon in August 2022, again before Judge Douglas. This time, DeLeon was reconvicted, a first for an overturned Scarcella-related verdict. DeLeon was sentenced to 20 years to life, with 24 years already served, making him immediately eligible to apply for parole. He was re-released in January 2023 and has appealed his reconviction.

=== Samuel Edmonson (2022, partially reconvicted 2025) ===
Samuel "Baby Sam" Edmonson was arrested in 1989, convicted in 1990, and received a 75-years-to-life sentence for ordering the murders of two associates in his Brooklyn cocaine business. In 2022, Judge Vincent Del Giudice vacated the convictions and ordered a new trial, after a key witness Keith Christmas testified that Detective Scarcella and a partner furloughed him from prison, reduced his outstanding charges, treated him to restaurants and prostitutes, and gave him a fabricated story to implicate Edmonson at the original trial, shortly after his own shooting that he believed Edmonson had ordered. Del Giudice ruled that Christmas's recantation was credible, in contrast to Scarcella's "demeanor while testifying, his selective recollection, and pattern of minimization of his role in investigations under scrutiny." Edmonson was temporarily released after serving 33 years, then returned to prison in 2025 when a state appellate court ruled that Christmas's recanted testimony should vacate only one of Edmonson's two murder convictions.

=== Vincent Ellerbe, James Irons, and Thomas Malik (2022) ===
Three teenagers, Vincent Ellerbe, James Irons, and Thomas Malik, were sentenced to 25 years to life for the 1995 arson murder of subway token clerk Harry Kaufman. The crime was highlighted by Bob Dole's presidential campaign and dubbed "the Money Train case" in light of the action film. Kaufman's murder was the worst of seven similar attacks citywide during the release of the film, whose fictional pyromaniac squirted gasoline into locked payment booths to torch the subway clerks. In 2022, a state judge cleared the three convicted men of all charges, after Brooklyn DA Gonzalez and the Conviction Review Unit found "serious problems with the evidence", concluding that the trio's confessions were false and had been coerced by Detectives Scarcella and Chmil. The defendants Irons and Malik were released from prison after nearly 27 years; Ellerbe had been paroled after 25. Reported monetary settlements were approximately $16.3 million each for Irons and Malik, and $9.25 million for Ellerbe.

=== Steven Ruffin (2024) ===
In an escalating dispute among teenagers, Steven Ruffin was wrongfully convicted of manslaughter for the 1996 shooting of schoolmate James Deligny, who himself was wrongfully identified for robbing earrings from Ruffin's sister Diane. Ruffin was paroled in 2010 after serving 14 years, and was ultimately exonerated in 2024 by Brooklyn DA Gonzalez and the Conviction Review Unit. They cited Ruffin's recanted confession to Detective Scarcella, lineup identification by a coached witness, and serious errors at trial. They further agreed with Ruffin that the evidence pointed to Diane's boyfriend, who was never investigated despite providing the murder weapon to Scarcella and confessing to Diane and her family. Ruffin has sued the city and state for his wrongful conviction, along with several police officers including Scarcella.

== Public perceptions ==
Among many similar statements, Scarcella told an interviewer in 2018: "I've done absolutely nothing wrong. I stand by my cases a hundred percent." He has not faced any substantial legal repercussions since retiring in 1999. In reviewing his cases, the Brooklyn District Attorney's Office has not charged Scarcella with breaking any laws during his NYPD service. Even if Scarcella had, as a former prosecutor explained, he would not face legal charges because the statute of limitations has expired on his homicide investigations. Although his 21 overturned cases have cost the state and city governments approximately $150 million in legal damages (not including years of staff costs), Scarcella continues to receive his NYPD pension, as state law prevents him from being stripped of it. Michael Palladino, president of the Detectives' Endowment Association, defended Scarcella as "a political scapegoat" of those with "a desire to rewrite history."

Murders in New York City by year (1928–2023, excluding the terrorist attacks of September 11, 2001)

Others argue that Scarcella has escaped punishment with the help of his "enablers" – among them, the New York Police Department, prosecutors and judges. As summarized by David Love, a journalist and former director of the Witness to Innocence organization for wrongfully convicted prisoners: "Dirty cops, corrupt prosecutors and unscrupulous judges join forces with ineffective defense lawyers and gullible juries to create this problem." Criminal defense lawyer Ron Kuby has stated: "The problem is that when New York City police officers and New York City detectives look back on this era, they view it as the greatest era of their lives. This is the era where they won the war on crime." (Driven by the crack epidemic, 1990 was the all-time high for New York murders, excluding the terrorist attacks of September 11, 2001.)

Scarcella has publicly maintained that every exoneree was guilty of the crimes charged. In questioning why the DA's Office has been reviewing his cases, Scarcella stated: "Anyone who would put an innocent man in jail – especially on homicide – deserves the death sentence, as far as I'm concerned." He has in fact reported receiving death threats after adverse publicity for his case work, and his brother's 2014 suicide note cited "liars" conducting the DA's review.

== Police accolades ==
Despite extensive scrutiny stemming from Scarcella's overturned cases, he remains well decorated. Notable recognitions include four Chief of Detectives' Awards for Outstanding Investigation, which he received for investigating: the 1984 serial "Flatbush Rapist" attacks; the nearly fatal 1986 stabbing of a dance choreographer; the 1990 murder of Rabbi Chaskel Werzberger (which led to an overturned conviction and a reprimand); and the 1995 "Money Train" firebombing of a subway token clerk (which led to three more overturned convictions). Before many of his cases unraveled with evidence of his misconduct, Scarcella appeared as a police interrogation expert on the Dr. Phil talk show in 2007, touting his record and defending his tactics: "I lie to them. I will use deception... I don't play by the rules, but I play within the moral rules and the rules of the arrest in Brooklyn, New York." The Retired Detectives of New York honored Scarcella at an October 2017 award dinner, in a display of "blue wall" solidarity after his 13th overturned homicide case.

== Notes and references ==
Notes b, c, d are straightforward tallies of items that are documented in the "Vacated convictions" section of the article text:
