= John Winslow (New York attorney) =

American lawyer

John Winslow (October 21, 1825 – October 18, 1898) was an American lawyer.

== Life ==
Winslow was born on October 21, 1825, in Ramapo, New York, the son of Eleazor Robbins Winslow and Ann Corbett. His ancestor was Kenelm Winslow, younger brother of Plymouth Colony Governor Edward Winslow. One of Winslow's brothers was Worcester mayor Samuel Winslow.

When Winslow was sixteen months old, he and his family moved to Newton, Massachusetts. In 1843, he entered Holliston Academy in Holliston. He then went to Phillips Academy in Andover, followed by two years in Brown University. In 1850, he entered Harvard Law School, where his close friend and roommate was Edward L. Pierce. He graduated from there with an LL.B. in 1852. He then moved to Brooklyn, New York, where he was admitted to the bar later that year and began practicing with his brother D. C. Winslow.

In 1853, Winslow was appointed Assistant District Attorney under Harmanus B. Duryea. In 1855, he was appointed Corporation Counsel under Mayor George Hall and advised him on the consolidation of Brooklyn with Williamsburgh. In 1859, he was elected Brooklyn District Attorney as a Republican. In one year, he secured 315 convictions out of 329 indictments. He served in that office for three years. After his term expired, he returned to his law practice. In 1866 he formed a partnership with Joshua Van Cott, with law offices in New York City. In 1873, he was an unsuccessful Republican candidate for the New York Supreme Court, but a year later Governor Dix appointed him to fill a vacancy as Brooklyn District Attorney. In 1882, he moved his law practice to Brooklyn, where he worked until his death.

Winslow was one of the founders of the Long Island Historical Society, and for many years was its secretary and a director. He was an original member of the Hamilton Club, a life member of the Brooklyn Institute of Arts and Sciences, president of the Republican League of Brooklyn, and an original incorporator, original director, first vice-president, and president of the New England Society of Brooklyn. He was a member of the Plymouth Church for several years. In 1854, he married Sarah Miller Bennett. They had one surviving child, Everetta Robbins.

Winslow died at his home in Bay Ridge on October 18, 1898. He was buried in Newton Cemetery in Newton, Massachusetts.

Legal offices
Preceded by John G. Schumaker	Brooklyn District Attorney; 1860–1862	Succeeded by Samuel D. Morris
Preceded by Thomas H. Rodman	Brooklyn District Attorney; 1874	Succeeded by Winchester Britton
