= Golb =

Golb may refer to:

- GOLB, character in the animated series Adventure Time
- People v. Golb, extensively litigated New York case
- Norman Golb (1928 – 2020), scholar of Jewish history
- Raphael Golb (born 1960), American lawyer
