= Rhiya Trivedi =

Attorney

Rhidaya Trivedi, commonly known as Rhiya Trivedi, is a lawyer based in New York City.

== Early life ==
Trivedi is from Canada. Her parents are South Asian immigrants from an upper-caste Hindu family.

As a teenager, Trivedi attended St. Paul's School in New Hampshire, where she led the student environmental group, Eco-Action. She went on to attend Middlebury College, where she continued climate justice work, and, in 2009, participated in the United Nations Climate Change Conference in Copenhagen. She was awarded a Thomas J. Watson Fellowship in May of 2012.

She attended New York University School of Law, where she presented an assignment that was judged by Ron Kuby. Kuby was impressed by Trivedi's argument, and offered her a summer internship, which turned into a full law partnership with him when she graduated in 2017. Trivedi gave the convocation address for her graduating class at NYU.

== Cases ==
In 2017, Trivedi and Kuby represented more than a dozen immigrant rights activists who were arrested while protesting the unconstitutional detention of immigrant rights leader Ravi Ragbir. Trivedi was a member of Ragbir's defense committee. Of the activists arrested, two were members of New York City Council — Jumaane Williams and Ydanis Rodriguez. Williams took his case to trial, and was convicted of one charge and acquitted of two others.

In 2018, Trivedi and Kuby represented Prakash Churaman, who was arrested for felony murder when he was 15, pro bono. Trivedi argued Churaman was coerced into confessing to a crime he didn't commit. In 2022, Churaman was cleared of all charges and began pursuing a 25 million dollar lawsuit against the NYPD.

Trivedi also defended activist, Ravi Ragbir, when he was detained by ICE in 2018 and threatened with deportation.

She defended activist, Patricia Okoumou, in a high-profile case against the immigration activist for climbing the statue of liberty in 2018, stating, "There are times when justice demands that we transcend the law".

In 2019, Trivedi and Kuby represented Sundhe Moses, a client that was abused and coerced into falsely confessing to a drive-by shooting by Louis Scarcella. Trivedi and Kuby helped Moses clear his criminal record.

In 2020, Trivedi and Kuby defended a homeless man, Joseph Matos, who stabbed a student in self-defense when he kicked the cardboard structure Matos was sleeping and living in.

In 2021, Trivedi defended environmental lawyer, Steven Donziger, against Chevron Corporation.

In 2022, Trivedi and Kuby began representing Chanel Lewis, a client convicted of the murder of Karina Vetrano. Trivedi helped expose the underlying racial bias in the investigation into the death of Ms. Vetrano.

In 2023, Trivedi and Kuby represented Kareem Mayo, a client who spent 20 years in prison for a murder he says he didn't commit. The conviction against Mayo was vacated by Judge Dena Douglas on January 23, 2023. Trivedi and Kuby also represented Daniel Gill in a 2023 lawsuit against Rudy Giuliani for “for false arrest, civil rights conspiracy resulting in false arrest and false imprisonment, defamation, intentional infliction of emotional distress, and negligent infliction of emotional distress”.

Trivedi has represented Todd Scott, one of the convicted killers of Edward Byrne (police officer), since 2020. Trivedi and Scott's relationship is profiled in the HBO Documentary, The Nature of the Crime, which was released in December 2024. Trivedi has represented other individuals serving prison sentences for killing police officers, including Lloyd Dennis, profiled in the New Yorker in 2019, and Jalil Muntaqim, former member of the Black Panther Party.

== Philosophy ==
Trivedi identifies as a prison abolitionist.
