= John Bunn =

John Bunn may refer to:

- John Bunn (basketball) (1898–1979), American basketball coach
- John Bunn (exonerated prisoner) (born 1976), African American man wrongfully convicted of a murder
- John Whitfield Bunn (1831–1920), American industrialist
