= John E. Ruston =

American lawyer

John Edward Ruston (June 14, 1872 – February 1, 1932) was an American lawyer from New York.

== Life ==
Ruston was born on June 14, 1872, in the Harlem neighborhood of New York City, New York. The family moved to Bedford, Brooklyn when he was four. His father, Charles Ruston, immigrated to America from London, England, when he was four and was a prominent New York City lawyer and the son of clergyman John Ruston. His mother was Elizabeth Miner Purdy.

Ruston attended the Boys High School. In 1890, he entered New York University. He graduated from there with a B.S. in 1894. He then attended New York University Law School, graduating from there with a LL.B. in 1895. In 1894, he also studied law in the law office of Bristow, Peet & Opdyke. From 1895 to 1896, he worked as a managing clerk for Henry C. De Witt. In 1896, he was admitted to the bar and became managing clerk for Russell & Winslow, a prominent corporations and building and loan associations law firm, and since then remained associated with them. He largely focused on corporation law in general and building and loan association law in particular, with a law office on 253 Broadway in Manhattan. At one point, he was a member of the law firm Ruston & Washburn with Cyrus V. Washburn, their law office located at 51 Chambers Street.

During World War I, Ruston was chairman of his local draft board and was a sergeant in Mounted Troop A of the Brooklyn Police Reserve. In 1917, District Attorney Harry E. Lewis appointed him Assistant District Attorney. When Lewis resigned as District Attorney to join the New York Supreme Court, Governor Nathan L. Miller appointed Ruston the new Brooklyn District Attorney in 1922. After his term expired in 1923, he became a member of the law firm Ruston & Snyder with assemblyman Marshall Snyder and maintained a law office on 50 Court Street in Brooklyn. He was also a trustee, executive committee member, and counsel of the Greater New York Savings Bank, which his father helped organize.

In 1902, Ruston married May Frances Henderson. He attended the Tompkins Avenue Congregational Church. He was a member of the Freemasons, the Royal Arch Masonry, the Knights Templar, the Shriners, the Mystic Order of Veiled Prophets of the Enchanted Realm, the Elks, Psi Upsilon, the Sons of the American Revolution, the Crescent Athletic Club, and the University Club. He was also president of the Brooklyn Chamber of Commerce and a member of the Brooklyn Bar Association and the New York County Bar Association. He was active member of the Brooklyn Republican Party.

Ruston died at his home in the Hotel Granada on February 1, 1932. His funeral service was conducted by lifelong friend S. Parkes Cadman, and he was buried in Green-Wood Cemetery.

Legal offices
Preceded by Herbert N. Warbasse	Brooklyn District Attorney; 1922	Succeeded by Charles J. Dodd
