= Philip Nobile =

American writer, historian, and social critic

Philip Nobile (born 1941 or 1942) is an American freelance writer, journalist, historian, teacher, and social critic/commentator. He has written or edited several books, published investigative journalism in leading newspapers and journals, and taught at the Cobble Hill School of American Studies, a public school in Brooklyn.

== Early life and education ==
Nobile was born in Boston. He studied as a seminarian, but left religious life to become a journalist.

== Journalism career ==
During his journalism career, Nobile has written for New York Press, New York Magazine, The Village Voice, The New York Review of Books, Harper's Magazine, Penthouse, Spin, Spy Magazine, Esquire, Newsday, The Weekly Standard, and The New York Post among other publications. He wrote on the idea of "positive incest" in a 1977 article on Warren Farrell in Penthouse that questioned the incest taboo. He was an editor, along with Eric Nadler, of Penthouse Forum. In addition, he is a regular contributor to the online History News Network. As a "muckraking" investigative journalist and media analyst, Nobile has generated controversy by his criticisms of a variety of public figures, including sexologist Shere Hite, talk radio host Don Imus, historians Doris Kearns Goodwin and David McCullough, and President Harry S. Truman.

In 1982, he wrote in Penthouse Forum of penis size research. He argued that data from Kinsey Institute studies showed that black penises were longer than white penises. This was based on a sample of 2,376 "white college men", 143 "non-white college men" and 59 "black college men". In 1984 he was sued by Shere Hite for his Penthouse Forum editorial that said that she should be driven "out of the erogenous zones". The $15 million case was settled out of court, but Nobile did not issue an apology or retraction. In 1990 he debated Judith Reisman on the work of Alfred Kinsey in an appearance on The Phil Donahue Show, where his writing on "positive incest" arose.

In 1990, he reported in The Village Voice what was described as a "key story" of a former altar boy's sexual relationship with the Rev. Bruce Ritter of Covenant House. This was one of the earliest reported cases of sexual abuse among religious in institutional settings. The cases went unprosecuted because of the five-year statute of limitations at the time for sexual abuse.

In 1993, after the death of author Alex Haley, Nobile criticized his noted novel, Roots (1976), in an article in The Village Voice, calling it a "hoax" and suggesting his Pulitzer Prize should be rescinded. Clarence Page responded in the Chicago Tribune that Nobile was missing the point of the effect of Haley's work and noted that the author had always said parts were fiction. Page wrote:

"I think he [Nobile] missed the larger, more important truth. If Roots was a hoax, it was a hoax Americans wanted desperately to believe, which says something more important about Americans than anything Nobile says about Haley."

Nobile's 2013 New York Post article asserted that President John Kennedy and Jackie Kennedy had sex on Air Force One on the day before his assassination. He based this report on a conversation he had with Kennedy biographer William Manchester, who did not want to be revealed as the source while he was alive. Nobile claimed that Jackie Kennedy Onassis suppressed publication of his book on the president's "Don Juanism" while she was an editor at Doubleday.

== History teacher ==
From 2001 to 2007, Nobile taught history and political science at the Cobble Hill School of American Studies, a public high school in Brooklyn, managed by the New York City Department of Education.

=== Cobble Hill School controversy ===
In 2004, Nobile accused Cobble Hill School administrators of tampering with scores on New York State Regents examinations in 2002–2003. As a result of Nobile's "whistleblowing", the Education Department assigned the case to Louis N. Scarcella, a retired police detective who then worked for the school system. Scarcella's 30-page report concluded that assistant principal Theresa Capra had tampered with scores and principal Lennel George had covered up the misconduct. Capra resigned during the investigation and denied the allegations. George was reassigned.

In 2005, Richard J. Condon, the special commissioner of investigation for New York City schools, re-investigated the events at Cobble Hill. The result of his 23-month investigation was a 67-page 2007 report that, according to The New York Times, referred to Nobile as "a subpar teacher with poor evaluations who wrongly accused Ms. Capra of engineering a cheating scheme because she had given him a negative review that could have led to his firing." (After the first investigation and Capra's resignation, Nobile gained tenure.) Condon's findings blamed investigator Scarcella for producing a "deeply flawed report" with "no credible evidence" and being "biased and overtly influenced by Mr. Nobile", who was at the time the union chapter leader. Capra was reinstated in the New York public schools, and George was appointed principal of another high school. Nobile responded: "This sounds like more cover-up to me."

Scarcella resigned his position after the 2007 report, and his supervisor in the investigation department was demoted. He maintained that his original 2005 report was accurate, stating, "All I can say is I stand by my investigation.… To this day, Mr. Nobile was correct about everything." Since then, official reviews of Scarcella's earlier police investigations have resulted in extensive evidence of investigative misconduct, at least 18 overturned homicide convictions, hundreds of combined years of wrongful imprisonment, and legal settlements surpassing $100 million. Scarcella has repeatedly denied wrongdoing.

Shortly before the second Cobble Hill report was published, Nobile was reassigned to administrative duties related to an investigation of alleged corporal punishment of two students. Nobile responded to the allegations by faulting the students. He described the new charges as "retaliatory" and a "smear" due to his "whistleblowing" in 2004.

== Books ==
Nobile has written or edited eleven books, including:

- Editor, Catholic Nonsense (1970)
- The New Eroticism: Theories, Vogues and Canons (1970)
- The Con III Controversy: The Critics Look at the Greening of America (1971)
- Intellectual Skywriting: Literary Politics and the New York Review of Books (1974)
- King Cancer: The Good, the Bad, and the Cure of Cancer (1975)
- with Eric David Nadler, United States of America vs. Sex: How the Meese Commission Lied About Pornography (1986)
- with Edward Eichel, The Perfect Fit: How to Achieve Mutual Fulfillment and Monogamous Passion Through the New Intercourse (1992)
- Editor and Foreword, Judgment at the Smithsonian: The Bombing of Hiroshima and Nagasaki (1995). The major part of the book was the full, original script of an exhibit planned by the Smithsonian for a 50th-anniversary exhibition related to the United States' atomic bombings in Japan during World War II. A political controversy arose, as some veterans objected to the Smithsonian's plan to present a balanced historical account, and the exhibit was cancelled.
