= Charles J. Dodd =

American lawyer, politician, and judge

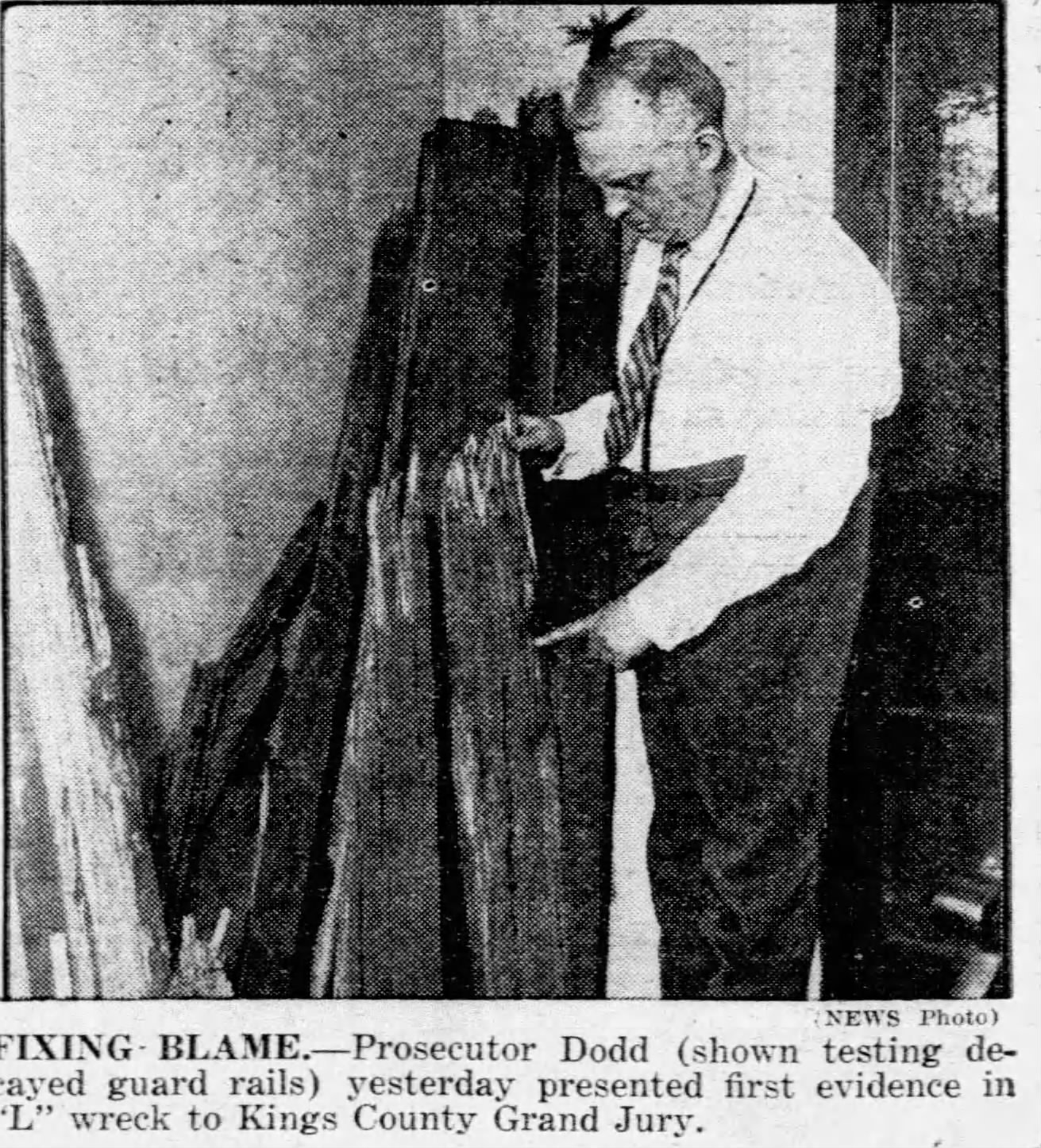
Charles J. Dodd, Kings County DA in 1923

Charles John Dodd (c. 1873 – July 24, 1947) was an American lawyer, politician, and judge from New York.

== Life ==
Dodd was born circa 1873 in Brooklyn, New York. He was the son of James Dodd, a sea captain and Elizabeth Hughes, an Irish immigrant from Dublin.

Dodd attended Boys High School, he spent five years working for the Manhattan law firm Seward, Guthrie & Steele, later known as Cravath, Swaine & Moore. He became managing attorney of the firm. He then began attending New York Law School in 1895, graduating from there in 1897. He was admitted to the bar a year later, and practiced law in both Brooklyn and Manhattan. He received an honorary Doctor of Laws degree from St. John's University in 1931.

In 1904, Dodd was elected to the New York State Assembly as a Democrat, representing the Kings County 6th District. He served in the Assembly in 1905. In 1908, Mayor McClellan appointed him justice of the Second District Municipal Court. In 1910, Mayor Gaynor appointed him City Magistrate. Gaynor re-appointed him to a full term in 1911, and in 1921 Mayor Hylan appointed him for another full term.

In 1922, Dodd was elected Brooklyn District Attorney. He served from 1923 to 1929. In 1929, he was elected Justice of the Second Judicial District of the State Supreme Court. He served as Justice from 1930 to 1942.

In 1907, Dodd married Florence Pigeon. Their children were George V., Charles J. Jr., and Robert A. His brother Rev. Francis J. was president of St. Joseph's College and director of the Sisters of Charity. He was active in Catholic charities and fraternal circles. He founded the Catholic Lawyers Guild in 1934, and in 1944 Pope Pius XI made him a Knight of St. Gregory. He was also vice president of the Roman Catholic Orphan Asylum of the Diocese of Brooklyn and a director of St. Vincent's Home and the Emerald Association. He was a member of Knights of Columbus, the Brooklyn Bar Association, the Society of Old Brooklynites, the Royal Arcanum, and the Friendly Sons of St. Patrick.

Dodd died at home after a six-month illness on July 24, 1947. He was buried in Holy Cross Cemetery.

New York State Assembly
Preceded by Frank J. Ulrich	New York State Assembly; Kings County, 6th District; 1905	Succeeded by Thomas J. Surpless
Legal offices
Preceded by John E. Ruston	Brooklyn District Attorney; 1923-1929	Succeeded by George E. Brower
