= George E. Brower =

American jurist

George E. Brower was an American jurist who was a justice of the New York Supreme Court, Kings County District Attorney, and a member of the New York State Athletic Commission.

== Early life ==
Brower was born in Brooklyn. His father, George V. Brower was president of the Brooklyn parks commission before Brooklyn was consolidated into New York City. He graduated from Princeton University in 1898 and Yale Law School in 1901. After he was admitted to the bar, Brower joined his father and brother at the firm of Brower, Brower, & Brower.

== New York State Athletic Commission ==
In 1923, Brower was appointed to the New York State Athletic Commission by Governor Al Smith. In 1924 he was elected chairman of the board. That year, Brower planned two tournaments - one for the featherweight title vacated by Johnny Dundee and another to determine the number one contender for Benny Leonard's lightweight championship. He was succeeded as chairman by James Farley in 1925, but chose to remain on the commission. The first major act of the Farley-led commission was to demand that world heavyweight champion Jack Dempsey defend his title against African-American Harry Wills. Brower publicly supported Wills and stated that he would vote in favor of stripping Dempsey of his title, but in 1926 he and William Muldoon voted to allow Dempsey to fight Gene Tunney instead of Wills.

== District attorney ==
On December 30, 1929, Brower was appointed Kings County District Attorney by Governor Franklin D. Roosevelt. He succeeded Charles J. Dodd, who had been appointed to the New York Supreme Court. Brower's appointment was backed by John H. McCooey political boss of the Democratic political machine in Brooklyn. During his tenure as Brooklyn's District Attorney, Brower's office investigated an alleged Protection racket perpetrated against laundry owners and the disappearance of wealthy boarding housekeeper Eugenie Cedarholm.

In August 1930, McCooey and the Brooklyn Democratic executive committee selected Brower's chief deputy William F. X. Geoghan as the party's nominee for district attorney. McCooey wanted Brower to instead challenge 14 term Republican James Church Cropsey for his seat on the state supreme court. However, that September Cropsey won the Democratic nomination unopposed, with Brower delivering a speech for the judge at the party convention.

== Supreme Court ==
In 1931, the New York State Legislature created twelve new Supreme Court seats and as part of a bipartisan agreement, Brower was appointed to one of the five new judgeships in Kings County. During his first years on the bench, Brower's principal duty was to oversee the liquidation, rehabilitation, and reorganization of bankrupt mortgage companies. He also ruled on mortgage reorganization proposals for 19 Rector Street and the Hotel Bossert, presided over the guardianship hearing of Edwin Markham, and served as a witness to the execution of Lepke Buchalter. He left the bench in 1945 upon reaching the mandatory retirement age of 70.

== Personal life ==
On October 9, 1936, Brower married Marian Willetts Brower, his brother's widow. They had two children and Brower was the stepfather to a son from Willetts' first marriage. Brower died on August 25, 1961, at his home in Roslyn, New York. He was 87 years old.

Legal offices
Preceded by Seat created	New York Supreme Court Justice for the 2nd Judicial District; 1931–1945	Succeeded by Jacob H. Livingston
Preceded by Charles J. Dodd	Kings County District Attorney; 1930–1930	Succeeded by William F. X. Geoghan
Political offices
Preceded by William Muldoon	Chairman of the New York State Athletic Commission; 1924–1925	Succeeded by James Farley
Preceded by George K. Morris	Member of the New York State Athletic Commission; 1923–1930	Succeeded by John J. Phelan
