= Nathan B. Morse =

American lawyer and judge from New York

Nathan Brewster Morse (November 14, 1799 – June 24, 1886) was an American lawyer and judge from New York.

== Life ==
Morse was born on November 14, 1799, in Canterbury, Connecticut, the son of Peter Morse and Lucinda Brewster.

Morse studied law with Ebenezer Young in Killingly, and after he was admitted to the Connecticut bar he practiced with Young for some time. In 1825, he moved to Brooklyn, New York, and was quickly admitted to the bar there. After practicing law alone for two years, he formed the law firm Morse & Rockwell with William Rockwell in 1827. At the time, there were only 14 members of the Kings County bar, with Morse believed to be the last surviving of the 14.

In 1829, Morse became the Brooklyn city treasurer. In 1830, he was appointed Kings County District Attorney. In 1833, he was appointed first judge of the Court of Common Pleas of Kings County, an office he held until 1838. A year later, he was again appointed Kings County District Attorney. In 1847, he was elected to a six-year term for the New York Supreme Court Justice, Second District. He was also the first president of the Union Ferry Company, a position he held for forty years.

In 1827, Morse married Eliza Tiffany, sister of Charles Lewis Tiffany. Their children were:

- Charlotte Tiffany Morse
- Charles Henry Morse (1826–1841; d.s.p.)
- Nathan Brewster Morse Jr. (19 January 1839 Brooklyn, Kings County, New York – 21 February 1879).

Eliza died in 1857. He later married widow Johanna S., mother of Elizabeth Richards Tilton.

Morse died at home on June 24, 1886. He was buried in Green-Wood Cemetery.

Legal offices
Preceded by James B. Clarke	Kings County District Attorney; 1830–1833	Succeeded by William Rockwell
Preceded by William Rockwell	Kings County District Attorney; 1839–1847	Succeeded by Harmanus B. Duryea
