= Winchester Britton =

American politician

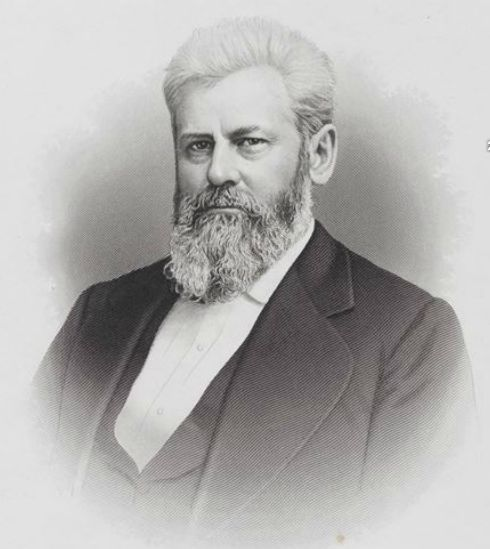
- Photograph taken by Alexander Hay Ritchie/Museum of the City of New York.

District Attorney of Kings County
- In office January 1, 1872 – February 20, 1874
- Preceded by: Samuel D. Morris
- Succeeded by: Thomas H. Rodman

District Attorney of Kings County
- In office January 1, 1875 – January 1, 1878
- Preceded by: John Winslow
- Succeeded by: Isaac S. Catlin

Personal details
- Born: April 9, 1826; North Adams, Massachusetts
- Died: February 13, 1886 (aged 59); Brooklyn, New York

Winchester Britton (April 9, 1826 - February 13, 1886) was an American attorney and politician from New York.

== Early life ==
He was born on April 9, 1828, in North Adams, Massachusetts. Named Sebre Winchester Britton, Jr., in early manhood he changed his name. His mother died when he was very young, and his father removed with him to Troy, New York when Winchester was 10 years of age. After receiving a preparatory education at the Clinton Liberal Institute, in Clinton, Oneida County, New York, and the Troy Conference Academy, in Poultney, Vermont, Britton went to Union College, from which he graduated with honors. While in college he roomed, part of the time, with future President Chester A. Arthur. Soon after leaving college, Britton read law for a while in the offices of John Van Buren, the second son of President Martin Van Buren.

== California ==
He dropped his legal studies in 1848, embarked for Aspinwall, Colon, crossed the Isthmus of Panama, and arrived in San Francisco, California aboard the steamer Crescent City. He was very successful in mining and other business enterprises in San Francisco, but after accumulating a small fortune he lost nearly every dollar of it by fire. In August 1851, he returned briefly to New York City and remained there until October of the same year, returning to San Francisco and taking an active part in politics. He was elected an alderman and ran for the assembly, but was beaten.

== New York ==
In 1853, he returned to New York to live and soon afterward he was admitted to the bar. He practiced with success in New York City for approximately 17 years until, in 1870, he removed his business to Brooklyn, where his residence had been for some years previous.

== District Attorney of Kings County ==
He was elected Kings County District Attorney in 1871, but was removed in 1874 by Governor John Adams Dix for alleged malfeasance in office. At the first election following his removal he was re-elected district attorney by a much larger majority than he received the first time he was elected. After his public service, he continued his private practice until his death.

== Personal life ==
Soon after returning to New York in 1853, Britton married Sarah Nelson Parker, daughter of William Ward Parker and Elizabeth, his wife. However, the following year, he was left a widower with an infant son, Clarence, who died soon afterward. In December 1855, he married Caroline Amelia Parker, sister of his former wife, by whom he had 11 children.
