= Harmanus B. Duryea =

American lawyer and politician

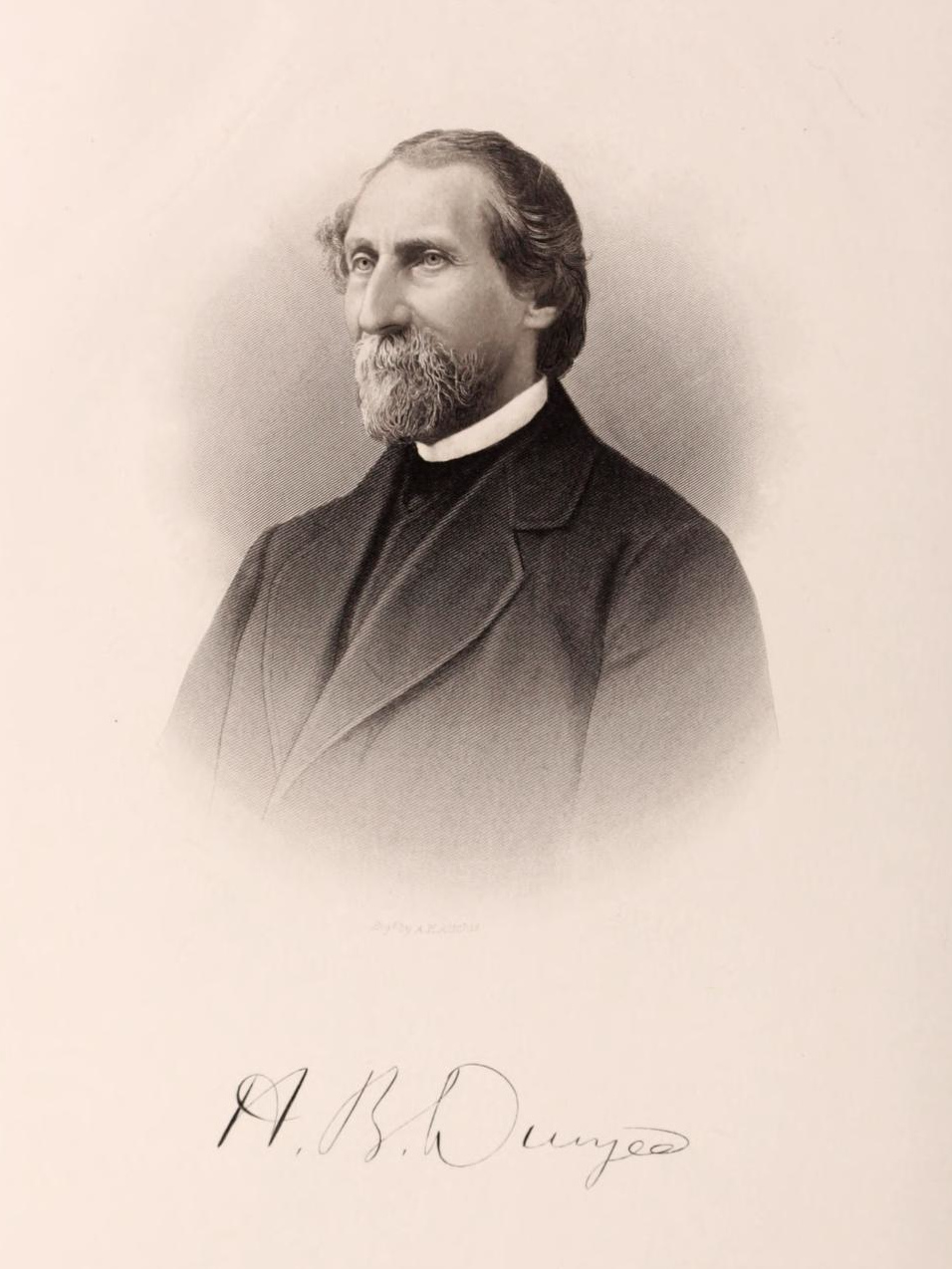
Harmanus B. Duryea (1815-1884)

Harmanus Barkuloo Duryea (July 12, 1815 – August 26, 1884) was an American lawyer, politician, and militia officer from New York.

== Life ==
Duryea was born on July 12, 1815, in Newtown, Queens County, New York, the son of Cornelius Rapelyea Duryea and Ann Barkuloo. The family moved to New York City in 1825, Brooklyn shortly afterwards. Cornelius was a successful hardware merchant.

Duryea studied law under future New York Supreme Court justice Thomas W. Clarke. He finished his law studies with judges John Greenwood and John Dikeman. He was admitted to the bar at the age of 21 and formed a law practice with Greenwood. In 1842, he was appointed a Supreme Court Commissioner for Kings County. He became Corporation Counsel for Brooklyn shortly afterwards. In 1847, he was elected Kings County District Attorney and served in that position for six years.

Duryea was a Whig, but after the Missouri Compromise was repealed he became a Republican. He served in the New York State Assembly, representing the Kings County 3rd District, in 1858 and 1859.

In 1836, Duryea first became associated with the Kings County militia. He served as lieutenant, captain, colonel, brigadier-general, major-general of the second division of the New York National Guard. The state military enacted improved regulations under his influence and he served as president of the State Military Association. Upon the outbreak of the American Civil War, he helped Brooklyn organize the 13th, 14th, and 28th regiments. He resigned in 1869, when he was the senior major-general in the state.

With his first wife, Elizabeth A. Bowne, he had two sons, Samuel Bowne Duryea and Cornelius Rodman Duryea (the latter died as a boy). With his second wife, Mary Peters, he had two sons, Pierrepont Halliburton Duryea and Herman B. Duryea. He was a member of the Hamilton Club in Brooklyn, and attended the Grace Church in Brooklyn Heights.

== Death ==
Duryea died at his country home on the Shrewsbury River on August 26, 1884. He was buried in Green-Wood Cemetery.

Legal offices
Preceded by Nathan B. Morse	Kings County District Attorney; 1847-1853	Succeeded by Richard C. Underhill
New York State Assembly
Preceded by John H. Funk	New York State Assembly; Kings County, 3rd District; 1858-1859	Succeeded by Theophilus C. Callicot
