= Eric Gonzalez (lawyer) =

American attorney (born 1969)

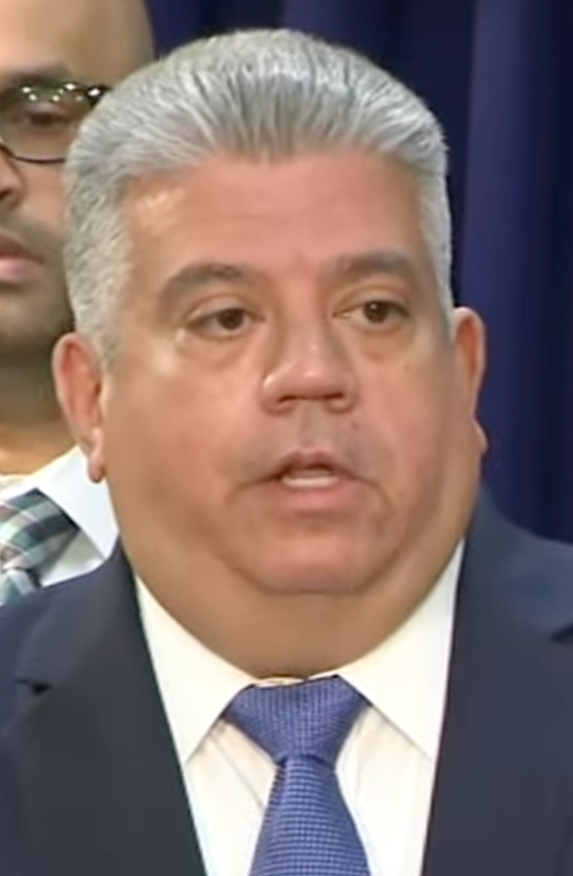
- Gonzalez in 2023

District Attorney of Kings County
- Incumbent
- Assumed office October 9, 2016; Acting: October 9, 2016 – January 21, 2018
- Preceded by: Kenneth P. Thompson

Personal details
- Born: January 24, 1969 (age 57) New York City, New York, U.S.
- Party: Democratic
- Education: Cornell University (BA); University of Michigan (JD)

Eric Gonzalez (born January 24, 1969) is an American attorney who is currently serving as the district attorney for Kings County in Brooklyn, New York. Gonzalez became the acting district attorney in October 2016 after his predecessor Kenneth P. Thompson, died shortly after announcing that he was stepping down to be treated for cancer. He had previously served as the chief assistant district attorney under Thompson from October 2014.

In September 2017, Gonzalez defeated five other candidates in the Democratic primary, all but assuring him of a full term. In November 2021, he was elected to another four-year term (through January 2026), garnering 98.8% of the vote in an uncontested election.

== Early life and education ==
Gonzalez grew up in the neighborhoods of East New York and Williamsburg in Brooklyn. He attended John Dewey High School in Coney Island and graduated from Cornell University in 1992 with a bachelor's in government and history. In 1995, he received his J.D. degree from the University of Michigan Law School, where he was president of the Latino Law Students Association.

== Career ==
=== District attorney's office ===
Gonzalez began his legal career as an assistant district attorney in the Kings County District Attorney's Office immediately after graduating law school in 1995. He served several years as a junior and then senior assistant in different bureaus, including the Sex Crimes and Special Victims Bureau, Domestic Violence Bureau, Orange Trial Zone Bureau, and Green Trial Zone Bureau.

Gonzalez was promoted to supervisory positions in the Green Trial Zone, which consists of the 60th, 61st, 70th, 71st, and 72nd precincts in Brooklyn. In 2011, he became the Executive Assistant District Attorney of the Green Trial Zone, and in March 2014 he was promoted to the position of Counsel to the District Attorney, where he guided the launch of several of District Attorney Kenneth P. Thompson's initiatives, including the creation of the Conviction Review Unit and the policy regarding the non-prosecution of many low-level marijuana possession cases. In October 2014, he was appointed chief assistant district attorney by Thompson.

=== Acting district attorney ===
On October 4, 2016, Thompson announced that he had been suffering from an undisclosed type of cancer and that he was selecting Gonzalez to serve as acting district attorney while he sought treatment. Thompson died just five days later. On October 17, New York governor Andrew Cuomo announced that he was not appointing an interim district attorney or calling a special election despite a push to replace Gonzalez with Public Advocate Letitia James, stating his desire that "[the district attorney's] work [continue] without interruption or delay."

=== Election ===
At the next year's election, Gonzalez won a six-way Democratic primary with 53% of the vote on September 12, 2017. He was elected in November 2017 with no Republican candidate opposing him, and was sworn in on January 21, 2018. He is the first Latino to serve as district attorney in New York.

== Professional affiliations and awards ==
Gonzalez is a member of the Puerto Rican Bar Association and is also on the Board of Directors of the Kings County Criminal Bar Association. In December 2016, he was given an award by the Bridge Multicultural Project in Brooklyn for promoting multicultural unity. In October 2017, he was honored by the Cervantes Society of the New York Unified Court System. He is a Cub scout den leader.

== Family and personal life ==
Gonzalez lives in Brooklyn with his wife and three sons. He is a member of the Latino-based Greek-lettered organization La Unidad Latina, Lambda Upsilon Lambda fraternity

Legal offices
Preceded by Kenneth P. Thompson	District Attorney of Kings County; 2016–present Acting: 2016–2018	Incumbent
