= Kenneth P. Thompson =

American lawyer (1966–2016)

Ken Thompson
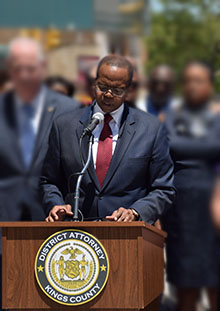

District Attorney of Kings County
- In office January 1, 2014 – October 9, 2016
- Chief Assistant: Eric Gonzalez (2014-2016)
- Preceded by: Charles J. Hynes
- Succeeded by: Eric Gonzalez

Personal details
- Born: March 14, 1966 New York City, New York, U.S.
- Died: October 9, 2016 (aged 50) New York City, New York, U.S.
- Party: Democratic
- Spouse: Lu-Shawn Thompson (m. 1999)
- Children: 2
- Education: John Jay College of Criminal Justice (BA); New York University (JD)

Kenneth P. Thompson (March 14, 1966 – October 9, 2016) was an American lawyer who served as the District Attorney of Kings County, New York, from 2014 until his death from cancer on October 9, 2016.

== Early life and education ==
Kenneth Thompson's parents, William and Clara Thompson, divorced in his early childhood. William was a city highway worker. In 1973, Clara became one of the first patrolwomen in the New York City Police Department.

After graduating from Norman Thomas High School in New York City, Kenneth attended John Jay College of Criminal Justice, and in 1989 he graduated magna cum laude. He then graduated from the New York University School of Law in 1992, where he earned the Arthur T. Vanderbilt Medal for contributions to the law school community.

== Career ==
=== Federal positions ===
Thompson began as an attorney in the United States Treasury Department in Washington, D.C., where he served as Special Assistant to former Treasury Department Undersecretary for Enforcement and then Secretary General of Interpol, Ronald K. Noble.

In 1995 Thompson accepted a position as an Assistant U.S. Attorney under Zachary W. Carter, in the United States Attorney's Office in Brooklyn. During his tenure, he worked with Loretta Lynch as a member of the federal prosecution team in the 1997 trial of former New York City police officer Justin Volpe, who was accused of sodomizing Abner Louima inside a bathroom at the 70th Precinct in Brooklyn. The watershed police brutality trial, at which Thompson delivered the opening prosecution arguments, resulted in Volpe changing his plea from 'not guilty' to 'guilty'.

=== Private practice ===
After his time as a federal prosecutor, Thompson went into private practice, first at the international law firm Morgan, Lewis & Bockius and then at his own law firm specializing in employment litigation, Thompson Wigdor LLP, which he co-founded in 2003 with Douglas Wigdor, a fellow lawyer in Morgan Lewis's Labor & Employment department. The firm, which was renamed Wigdor LLP when Thompson took office in 2014, is part of his legacy and continues its founder's work.

Thompson also worked with Senator Chuck Schumer, Congresswoman Yvette Clarke, other elected officials, and members of the clergy to convince the United States Department of Justice to reopen the investigation into the 1955 murder of 14-year-old Emmett Till in Mississippi.

Thompson represented Kimberly Osorio in her case against The Source Magazine back in 2006. Osorio outlined the environment which was present at the magazine: employees often watched pornographic movies, hung pictures of females in G-strings, and spoke down to women. After filing a complaint with the company's Human Resources department, she was terminated. The trial lasted 8 days, with a jury of six men and two women finding Osorio had in fact been terminated in retaliation, and that Scott had defamed her character. The total judgment was $7.5 million. "This verdict shows that all women must be treated with dignity and respect, no matter what industry they work in," Thompson told reporters.

In 2011, he represented Nafissatou Diallo, the hotel housekeeper who claimed that she was sexually assaulted in a Manhattan hotel room by Dominique Strauss-Kahn, the former head of the International Monetary Fund. Though government prosecutors dropped the criminal suit against Strauss-Kahn, stating they were not convinced of his culpability beyond a reasonable doubt due to what they described as serious issues in Diallo's credibility and inconclusive physical evidence, Thompson refused to let the case go; he filed motions to have the district attorney's office disqualified, and when the motion was denied he appealed that decision, only to have his appeal denied. After the criminal case was dismissed, Thompson brought a civil suit against Strauss-Kahn and a civil suit against the New York Post on Diallo's behalf; in December 2012 the civil suits settled with confidential terms.

=== District Attorney ===
In September 2013, Thompson defeated incumbent Charles J. Hynes in the Democratic primary for Brooklyn District Attorney, where Thompson ran as a critic of the New York City Police Department. After Hynes decided to run on the Republican and Conservative party lines in the general election in November, Thompson defeated him again.

Thompson was the first challenger to defeat a sitting District Attorney in Brooklyn since 1911, and the first African-American district attorney of Kings County. He took office on January 1, 2014.

His tenure was particularly noted for his advocacy of minority communities, the decision to no longer prosecute low-level marijuana cases, a crackdown on gun violence, an internal review board that exonerated at least 20 wrongfully convicted defendants, and his "Solomonic" decision not to seek prison time after convicting a rookie police officer of manslaughter for the ricochet shooting of Akai Gurley in a dark stairwell.

After Thompson's death from cancer, New York Governor Andrew Cuomo announced that Thompson's Chief Assistant District Attorney Eric Gonzalez would serve out the remaining year of Thompson's term. On October 9, 2021, the fifth anniversary of Thompson's death, the block of Jay Street by his office was permanently co-named "District Attorney Kenneth P Thompson Way".

== Personal life ==
Thompson married Lu-Shawn Thompson in 1999; the couple had two children.

On October 4, 2016, Thompson announced that he had been diagnosed with cancer. He died on October 9 at Memorial Sloan Kettering Cancer Center at the age of 50.

Legal offices
| Preceded by Charles J. Hynes | Kings County District Attorney; 2014–2016 | Succeeded by Eric Gonzalez |
