= John Bunn (exonerated prisoner) =

American wrongfully convicted of murder

John Bunn (born 1976) is an African American man wrongfully convicted of a murder committed in 1991, when he was 14. Bunn spent over 16 years in prison and nearly 12 on parole before he was exonerated in 2018. After his release, Bunn founded a nonprofit that aims to educate incarcerated youth and provide access to books to promote literacy.

== Early life ==
Bunn grew up in Crown Heights, Brooklyn. He and his younger sister were raised by his mother.

== Murder conviction ==
On August 14, 1991, two Rikers Island corrections officers were shot in their car during a robbery in the Kingsborough Housing Project; one died. The surviving officer, Robert Crosson, stated that the shooters were two light-skinned black men in their twenties.

Louis N. Scarcella, an NYPD detective later accused of serially falsifying evidence, arrested 14-year-old Bunn and 17-year-old Rosean Hargrave on an anonymous tip the following day, although neither teen fit the physical descriptions provided by Crosson. Crosson subsequently identified the two as the shooters, in a photo lineup organized by Scarcella's partner. In November 1992, a jury convicted both teens of second degree murder. Hargrave was sentenced to 30 years to life and Bunn was sentenced to 7 years to life.

== Prison life ==
Bunn was initially held in a juvenile facility in upstate New York. He did not receive a comprehensive education, and had to teach himself, earning his GED at 17. At 17, he was transferred to Elmira Correctional Facility.

Bunn was paroled in 2006 for good behavior after saving a counselor from being raped by a fellow inmate, but still fought to clear his conviction.

== Exoneration ==
In 2013, evidence of extensive misconduct by Detective Scarcella came to light, triggering a number of motions for retrial from defendants previously accused by him of crimes. In April 2015, Justice ShawnDya Simpson vacated the conviction of Rosean Hargrave, based on the "false and misleading practices" of Scarcella. Judge Simpson similarly vacated Bunn's conviction and ordered a retrial in November 2016, noting that evidence that could have been used to identify perpetrators—namely, the blood on the outside of the police car—had been destroyed by police. After an appeals court upheld Simpson's ruling in April 2018, the prosecution dismissed charges against Hargrave and Bunn in May. Bunn filed a lawsuit for "malicious prosecution, denial of due process and civil rights conspiracy", which the city settled for $5.9 million in 2020.
