= Therese Patricia Okoumou =

Immigrant rights activist

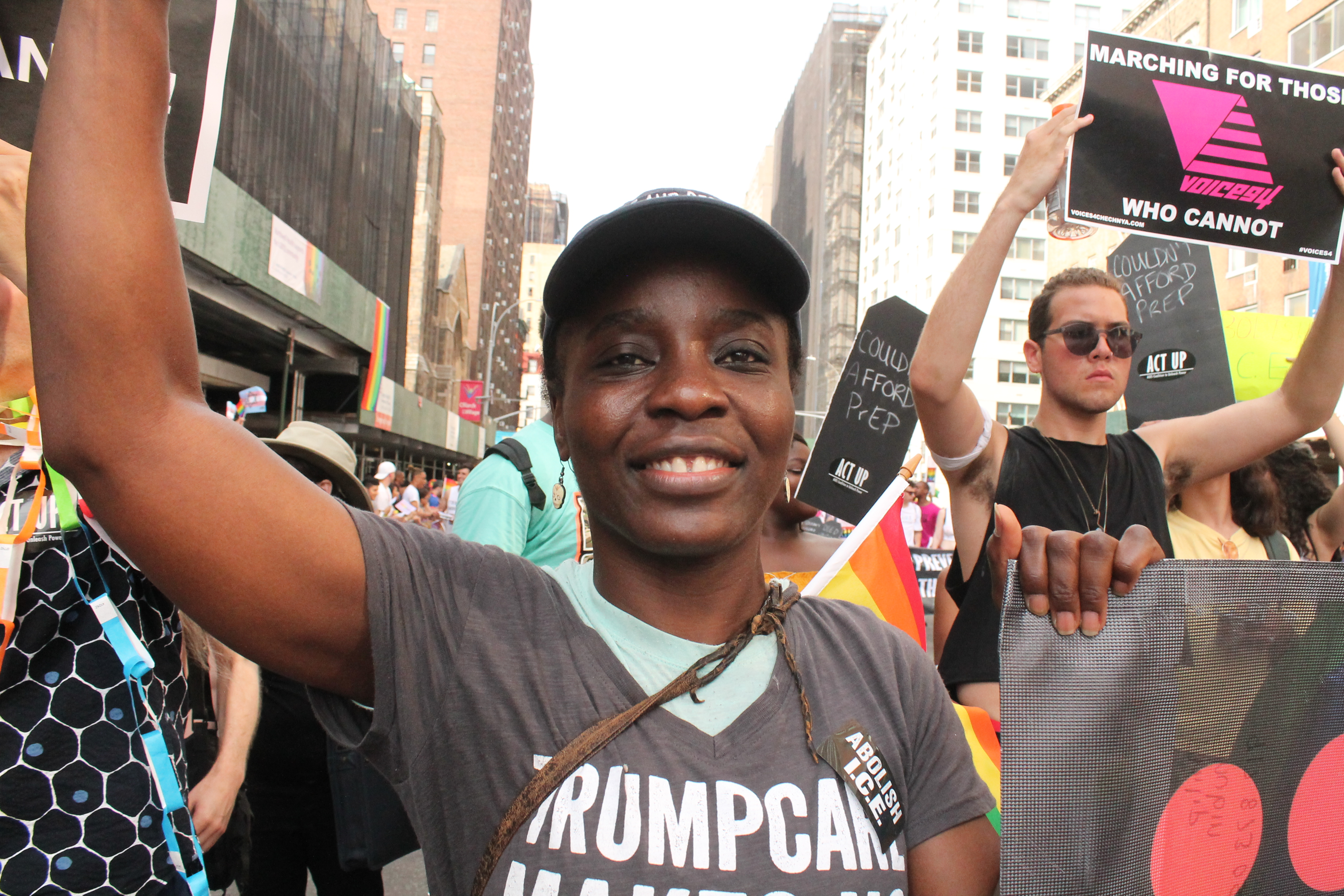
Okoumou at 48th Heritage of Pride Parade March in New York City, NY on June 24, 2018.

Therese Patricia Okoumou, commonly known as Patricia Okoumou, is a Republic of the Congo-born immigrant rights activist, most known for scaling the base of the Statue of Liberty in protest of children being separated from their parents at the Mexico-United States border in 2018. She was credited by Hawk Newsome as "the most prominent Black voice in this immigrant rights movement right now."

== Early life ==
Okoumou was born in the Republic of the Congo. As a child, she and her peers climbed structures in Brazzaville where she lived. Her father worked as a pilot for then-Republic of the Congo president Denis Sassou Nguesso. In 1993, when Okoumou was a young adult, civil war occurred in her home, exposing her to violence, and prompting her move to the United States. During her first years in the US, she worked as a physical therapist, personal trainer, and staffer in a domestic violence shelter. She has stated of her reasoning for moving to the US, "I had that false notion of diversity and inclusiveness."

== Demonstrations ==
On November 21, 2016, Okoumou protested Donald Trump's election for hours by herself outside of Trump Tower, leading to Cenk Uygur of The Young Turks interviewing her.

On July 4, 2018, Okoumou climbed the Statue of Liberty to protest the Trump administration's family separation policy. Okoumou scaled the statue after participating in a protest with Rise and Resist New York. She decided to climb as an impulse after being told to by God, in protest of 2,300 children being "separated from their families over a six-week period in April and May" of 2018. She stayed on the base of the statue for four hours, during which 4,500 Ellis Island visitors were evacuated. Okoumou was defended by Rhiya Trivedi in court. In 2019, Okoumou was given 5 years probation and 200 hours of community service for charges of trespassing, interference with agency functions, and disorderly conduct.

On November 29, 2018, Okoumou climbed halfway up the Eiffel Tower and displayed a banner that read "#ReturnTheChildren", before being removed by police. She chose the tower due to its connection to the Statue of Liberty, which was a gift from France to the United States as a symbol of liberty.

In January 2019, Okoumou began a ten-day journey across detention camps in Texas, where she and other activists visited undocumented children and offered Valentine's Day cards. On February 20, 2019, Okoumou climbed the Austin headquarters of Southwest Key, an organization that operated 24 migrant detention centers that held children. She hung a banner that read, "Abolish ICE" and stayed on a three-foot beam on top of the building for over eight hours, before climbing down and going to the hospital to be evaluated. For her parole violation, she was ordered confined to her apartment in Staten Island, New York.
