= Brooklyn District Attorney =

District attorney's office for Kings County, New York

Kings County District Attorney of Brooklyn

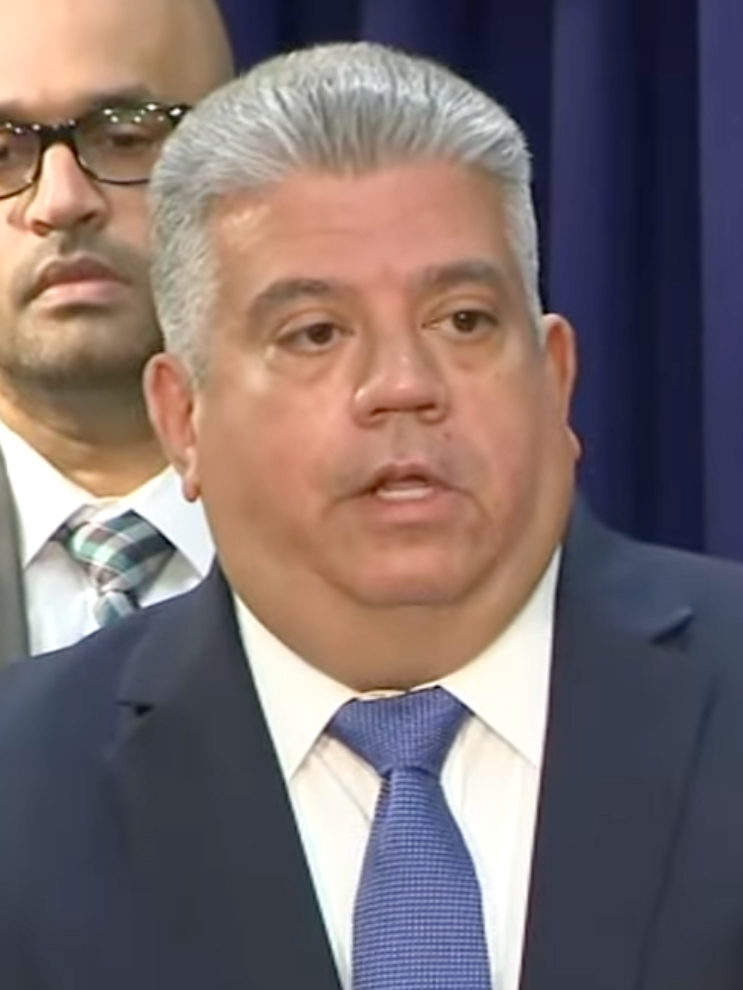
- Incumbent; Eric Gonzalez since October 9, 2014; Acting: October 9, 2014 – January 21, 2018
- Type: District Attorney
- Term length: 4 years
- Formation: February 12, 1796; 230 years ago
- First holder: Nathaniel Lawrence
- Deputy: Chief Assistant District Attorney, Nancy Hoppock

The Kings County District Attorney's Office, also known as the Brooklyn District Attorney's Office, is the district attorney's office for Kings County, coterminous with the Borough of Brooklyn, in New York City. The office is responsible for the prosecution of violations of the laws of New York. (Violations of federal law are prosecuted by the United States Attorney for the Eastern District of New York.) The current district attorney is Eric Gonzalez.

== History ==
In a legislative act of February 12, 1796, New York State was divided into seven districts, each with its own Assistant Attorney General. Kings County was part of the First District, which also included Queens, Richmond, Suffolk, and Westchester counties. (At that time, Queens County included much of present-day Nassau County, and Westchester County included present-day Bronx County.) In 1801, the office of Assistant Attorney General was renamed District Attorney and New York County was added to the First District. Westchester County was separated from the First District in 1813, and New York County was separated in 1815. In 1818, each county in the state became its own separate district.

Until 1822, district attorneys were appointed by the Council of Appointment, and held office "during the Council's pleasure", meaning that there was no defined term. Under the State Constitution of 1821, the district attorney was appointed to a three-year term by the Court of General Sessions, and under the State Constitution of 1846, the office became elective by popular ballot. The governor filled vacancies until a successor was elected, always to a full term, at the next annual election. An acting district attorney was appointed by the Court of General Sessions pending the Governor's action.

Since the Consolidation Charter of New York City in 1898, the terms of the district attorneys in New York City have coincided with the mayor's term, and are for four years. In case of a vacancy, the governor appoints an interim district attorney and can call a special election for the remainder of the term.

== List of Kings County District Attorneys ==
Name	Dates in Office	Party	Notes
Nathaniel Lawrence	February 16, 1796 – July 15, 1797	Dem.-Rep.	died
vacant	July 15, 1797 – January 16, 1798		
Cadwallader D. Colden	January 16, 1798 – August 19, 1801	Federalist	
Richard Riker	August 19, 1801 – February 13, 1810	Dem.-Rep.	
Cadwallader D. Colden	February 13, 1810 – February 19, 1811	Federalist	
Richard Riker	February 19, 1811 – March 5, 1813	Dem.-Rep.	
Barent Gardenier	March 5, 1813 – April 8, 1815	Federalist	
Thomas S. Lester	April 8, 1815 – March 12, 1819	?	
James B. Clarke	March 2, 1819 – April 26, 1830	?	
Nathan B. Morse	April 26, 1830 – 1833	?	
William Rockwell	1833 – June 3, 1839	?	
Nathan B. Morse	June 3, 1839 – June 1847	?	
Harmanus B. Duryea	June 1847 – December 31, 1853	?	
Richard C. Underhill	January 1, 1854 – December 31, 1856	Whig	elected to a three-year term
John G. Schumaker	January 1, 1857 – December 31, 1859	Democratic	elected to a three-year term
John Winslow	January 1, 1860 – December 31, 1862	Republican	elected to a three-year term
Samuel D. Morris	January 1, 1863 – December 31, 1871	Republican	elected to three three-year terms
Winchester Britton	January 1, 1872 – February 20, 1874	Democratic	elected to a three-year term; removed for official misconduct by Governor John A. Dix
Thomas H. Rodman	February 21, 1874 – May 9, 1874 (interim)	Democratic	appointed by Governor John A. Dix; resigned due to illness
John Winslow	May 9, 1874 – December 31, 1874 (interim)	Republican	appointed by Governor John A. Dix
Winchester Britton	January 1, 1875 – December 31, 1877	Democratic	elected to a three-year term; lost re-election to Catlin
Isaac S. Catlin	January 1, 1878 – December 31, 1883	Republican	elected to two three-year terms; did not run for a third term
James W. Ridgway	January 1, 1884 – December 31, 1895	Democratic	elected to four three-year terms; did not run for a fifth term
Foster L. Backus	January 1, 1896 – December 31, 1897	Republican	elected to a three-year term, which was shortened due to the consolidation of New York City
Josiah Taylor Marean	January 1, 1898 – January 2, 1899	Democratic	elected to a four-year term; resigned to become a Supreme Court Justice
Hiram R. Steele	January 2, 1899 – December 31, 1899 (interim)	Republican	appointed by Gov. Theodore Roosevelt; ran for election but lost to Clarke
John F. Clarke	January 1, 1900 – December 31, 1911	Democratic	elected to three four-year terms; lost to Cropsey in election
James C. Cropsey	January 1, 1912 – April 1916	Fusion	defeated Clarke in election; elected to another four-year term; resigned to accept a nomination by Governor Charles S. Whitman to become a Supreme Court judge
Harry E. Lewis	April 1916 – late 1916 (interim) late 1916 – December 31, 1921	Republican	appointed by Governor Whitman to replace Cropsey for the remainder of the year; elected to the remainder of Cropsey's term; elected to a four-year term; resigned after being elected Supreme Court Justice
Herbert N. Warbasse	December 31, 1921 – January 2, 1922 (acting)	?	filled in after Lewis resigned and before Ruston was sworn in
John E. Ruston	January 2, 1922 – December 31, 1922 (interim)	Republican	appointed by Gov. Nathan L. Miller; lost to Dodd in election
Charles J. Dodd	January 1, 1923 – December 30, 1929	Democratic	defeated Ruston in the election for the remainder of Lewis' term; re-elected to two four-year terms; resigned to become a Supreme Court justice
George E. Brower	January 1, 1930 – December 31, 1930 (interim)	Democratic	appointed by Governor Franklin Roosevelt to serve the remainder of the year
William F.X. Geoghan	January 1, 1931 – December 31, 1939	Democratic	elected to the remainder of Dodd's term; elected to two four-year terms; retired
William O'Dwyer	January 1, 1940 – June 1, 1942	Democratic	elected to two four-year terms; went on military leave
Thomas Cradock Hughes	June 1, 1942 – February 1, 1945 (acting)	Democratic	acting in place of William O'Dwyer during his military leave
William O'Dwyer	February 1, 1945 – August 2, 1945	Democratic	returned from military service; resigned to run for Mayor, and won
George J. Beldock	August 10, 1945 – December 27, 1945 (interim)	Republican	appointed by Governor Thomas E. Dewey for the remainder of the year; defeated by McDonald in election
Miles F. McDonald	December 27, 1945 – December 29, 1953	Democratic	elected to two four-year terms; won the Democratic, Republican, and Liberal party primaries in 1953, but then resigned and withdrew from the election to accept a nomination to run for Supreme Court justice
Edward S. Silver	December 29, 1953 – September 19, 1964	Democratic, Liberal, Independent	selected by the Brooklyn Democratic Party and Liberal Party executive committees to replace McDonald as the nominee on their slates in the primary election, then won the primary and general elections; elected to two more four-year terms; resigned to run for Surrogate
Aaron E. Koota	September 19, 1964 – December 31, 1964 (acting); January 1, 1965 – September 7, 1968 (elected)	Democratic	became acting district attorney upon Silver's resignation; selected by the Kings County Democratic Party executive committee as the nominee for the election to replace Silver, and won; elected to a four-year term; resigned to accept a nomination to run for Supreme Court justice
Elliot Golden	late 1968 – December 31, 1968 (acting)	Democratic	became acting district attorney upon Koota's resignation
Eugene Gold	January 1, 1969 – December 31, 1981	Democratic, Liberal	selected by the Kings County Democratic Committee as the nominee in the election to replace Koota, and won; elected to three four-year terms; retired
Elizabeth Holtzman	January 1, 1982 – December 31, 1989	Democratic, Liberal	elected to two four-year terms; did not run for re-election (ran for City Comptroller instead, and won)
Charles J. Hynes	January 1, 1990 – December 31, 2013	Democratic	elected to six four-year terms; lost Democratic primary and general elections to Thompson
Kenneth P. Thompson	January 1, 2014 – October 9, 2016	Democratic	elected to a four-year term by winning both the Democratic primary and general elections over Hynes; died in office
Eric Gonzalez	October 9, 2016 – January 21, 2018 (acting); January 21, 2018 – current (elected)	Democratic	designated by Thompson to be acting district attorney in his absence due to illness; elected to a four-year term
