= Sandpaper Ballet =

Ballet by Mark Morris

- Choreographer: Mark Morris
- Music: Leroy Anderson
- Premiere: April 27, 1999; War Memorial Opera House
- Original ballet company: San Francisco Ballet
- Design: Isaac Mizrahi; James F. Ingalls

Sandpaper Ballet is a ballet choreographed by Mark Morris to music by Leroy Anderson. It was created for the San Francisco Ballet, and premiered on April 27, 1999, at the War Memorial Opera House.

== Production ==
=== Choreography ===
Mark Morris's Sandpaper Ballet was created for the San Francisco Ballet. Tina Fehlandt, a frequent collaborator of Morris who had staged the ballet, said Morris "loves ballet, and he uses ballet vocabulary [...] But he likes to use it in a different way." She noted that this ballet is "very classical." The ballet is performed by sixteen women and nine men. Fehlandt said Morris deliberately used an odd number of dancers as a challenge as he "loves spacial patterns and moving large groups of people around" and "wanted to challenge himself." She also said Morris wants the dancers to be individualistic, "so there's not a sense they're performing at you. Although, that said, if you didn't feel good on a particular day he'd want you to pretend."

=== Music ===
The ballet is set to music by Leroy Anderson, who was associated with the Boston Pops Orchestra. All eleven scores used by Anderson are three to four minutes long, though "Sleigh Ride" is used as an overture. and "Sandpaper Ballet", from which the title of the ballet is taken, is not featured. It was Morris' first piece with a full orchestra, and he called the music "little gems; one-liners that really show off the band."

=== Designs ===
Isaac Mizrahi designed the costumes, with the dancers in blue and white tops, lime green unitards and gloves, plus skirts for women. James F. Ingalls designed the lighting.

== Performances ==
Sandpaper Ballet had its premiere on April 27, 1999 at the War Memorial Opera House, conducted by Emil de Cou. The company had since revived the ballet, most recently in 2020. The company will release a video recording of the full ballet online in 2021 as a part of their digital season, which will be held in lieu of the premiere of a new Morris ballet and the 2021 repertory season, both of which had to be cancelled due to the COVID-19 pandemic in the San Francisco Bay Area.

The Houston Ballet performed the ballet in 2005, staged by Fehlandt, and Morris completed the final touches.

== Original cast ==
The ballet is performed by 25 dancers. The original cast includes:

- Evelyn Cisneros
- Stephen Legate
- Julia Adam
- Julie Diana
- Joanna Berman
- Yuri Possokhov

== Music ==
All the music used in Sandpaper Ballet were composed by Leroy Anderson, including:

- "Sleigh Ride"
- "The Typewriter"
- "A Trumpeter's Lullaby"
- "Saraband"
- "Balladette"
- "Jazz Pizzicato"
- "Jazz Legato"
- "Fiddle-Faddle"
- "The Girl in Satin"
- "Song of the Bells"
- "The Syncopated Clock"

== Critical reception ==
Following the premiere, Octavio Roca of SFGate called Sandpaper Ballet "the hit of the evening," and commented, "Morris giddily ignores the lines between principal dancer and corps, and he has designed dance patterns that make each dancer look his or her best." In 2002, Anna Kisselgoff of the New York Times commented, "It looks funny, but its geometric formations are choreographed with dead seriousness [...] The steps look occasionally messy in the solos and trios but the formations look great, especially when someone is inevitably out of line."
