= Harvey Lichtenstein =

American arts administrator

Harvey Lichtenstein (April 9, 1929 – February 11, 2017) was an American arts administrator. He is best known for his 32-year tenure (1967–99) as president and executive producer of the Brooklyn Academy of Music, or BAM, as it became known under his leadership. He led the institution to a renaissance, championing contemporary performance, establishing the Next Wave Festival, and providing a vital venue for dance, theater, music, and collaborations that bridged disciplines. The long list of artists who came to perform on BAM's stages under Lichtenstein's purview reads like a Who's Who of 20th-century performance, and includes Laurie Anderson, Pina Bausch, Peter Brook, Merce Cunningham, Philip Glass, Meredith Monk, Jerzy Grotowski, Mark Morris, Steve Reich, Twyla Tharp, and Robert Wilson. When Lichtenstein retired, the Doris Duke Charitable Foundation made the decision to honor his considerable accomplishments by foregoing its own naming rights and dedicating the BAM Harvey Theater in his honor.

== Early life ==
Lichtenstein was born on April 9, 1929, in Brooklyn, New York, to Jennie (née Waldowsky) and Samuel Lichtenstein, a Polish immigrant who was a milliner and the son of a Rabbi. His mother was of Ukrainian descent. Educated in public school and the City University of New York (CUNY) system, Lichtenstein graduated from Brooklyn Technical High School and Brooklyn College. During college, he attended his first modern dance performance when a girlfriend ushered at a Martha Graham concert, inspiring him to study dance. Lichtenstein spent time at Bennington College, Black Mountain College, and American Dance Festival, and performed in several New York companies, dancing with Sophie Maslow and Pearl Lang. He also spent a year in the New York City Opera corps de ballet. When the financial pressures of family pulled him from the stage, he turned to fundraising, and worked at both New York City Ballet and the New York City Opera.

== President and executive producer of BAM ==
In 1967, Lichtenstein was offered the directorship of Brooklyn Academy of Music. Established in 1861, the institution had a long and venerable history, but had fallen on hard times. The surrounding neighborhood had become seriously economically depressed, and the theater, then considered a backwoods cousin to its glittering Manhattan counterparts, booked mostly lectures and touring musicians in one-night engagements, or too often stood empty. Lichtenstein was advised against taking the helm of such a troubled institution, but thought, "Nobody else is offering me a theater to run, and I really would like to give it a try."

Lichtenstein's task was to revitalize the institution, soon rebranded with the acronym BAM, by bringing in adventurous programming that could not be seen elsewhere. Drawing on his love and knowledge of modern dance, he booked Merce Cunningham for an eight-performance run, the first major season of its kind. He followed that with a Festival of Dance that included 11 leading choreographers, opening with Martha Graham, and including Paul Taylor, Alvin Ailey, José Limón, Erick Hawkins, and a very young Twyla Tharp. The New York Times proclaimed, "For the first time in history, modern dance will have a full season of performances."

During Lichtenstein's tenure, DanceAfrica was also established, an annual week-long celebration of dance, music, art, film, and culture celebrating the culture of the African continent and its diaspora. Lichtenstein also championed cutting-edge theater. Early bookings included Julian Beck and Judith Malina's The Living Theatre (with nudity that drew the attention of the New York City Police Department), and Jerzy Grotowski and his Polish Laboratory Theatre. Early on, he established a relationship with Peter Brook and the Royal Shakespeare Company, and tried to establish a similar repertory theater at BAM, though that experiment never took root.

== Next Wave Festival ==
Lichtenstein's interest in contemporary performance was showcased further when he started the Next Wave Series in 1981, which crystallized into the full-scale Next Wave Festival in 1983. Next Wave performances were often non-linear and imagistic, and were frequently the result of collaborations among artists in a grab bag of disciplines – visual artists, choreographers, composers, musicians, theater directors, playwrights, and videographers. The artists in the Next Wave did not often have the opportunity in the U.S. to work in such a large scale. Many became inextricably associated with the institution, as did the pieces they presented, for instance Peter Brook's The Mahabharata and Philip Glass and Robert Wilson's Einstein on the Beach. The relationships BAM forged with artists often became ongoing; since the start of the festival, BAM has hosted nine productions by Robert Lepage, and 12 by Pina Bausch's Tanztheater Wuppertal, which performs in New York exclusively at BAM. In 1997, The New York Times said, "the Brooklyn Academy of Music's Next Wave Festival has become the foremost showcase for contemporary experimental performance in the United States."

The Next Wave programming, offered in the fall, was anchored by an equally strong spring season, with bookings of New York artists as well as major international companies that reflect BAM's global relationships. Characteristic performances include opera such as William Christie's French Baroque company Les Arts Florissants, as well as theater by prominent British companies such as Royal Shakespeare Company, Young Vic, Donmar Warehouse, Propeller, and Cheek by Jowl, which present new takes on the classics.

== Work with Downtown Brooklyn Partnership ==
Lichtenstein's legacy includes significant contributions to the revitalization not only of BAM, but of its Brooklyn neighborhood. Under his leadership, BAM acquired another venue, an abandoned theater initially renamed the BAM Majestic, and later, upon Lichtenstein's retirement in 1999, the BAM Harvey Theater. Lichtenstein's dream was to attract other arts institutions to the area to create a cultural district with BAM as its center. When he retired as president and executive producer, he immersed himself in the BAM Local Development Corporation, now part of the Downtown Brooklyn Partnership, "whose mission was to create a vibrant, mixed-use multicultural arts district in downtown Brooklyn". With the construction, notably, of the Mark Morris Dance Center, Theatre for a New Audience's Polonsky Shakespeare Center, and the BAM Fisher Building, that dream has been realized, and Fort Greene is now recognized as a vibrant, established arts destination.
