= Trumpet Extraordinary =

Studio album by Rafael Méndez
- Released: 1957
- Genre: Classical
- Label: Decca; DL-8427

Rafael Méndez chronology
The Trumpet Virtuosity of Rafael Méndez	Trumpet Extraordinary	Trumpet Showcase

Trumpet Extraordinary is the thirteenth studio album by trumpeter Rafael Méndez. In this album, Rafael is joined by his twin sons, Robert and Ralph, who at the time, were both nineteen years old and sophomore medical students at Stanford University. Prior to entering college, the brothers had travelled with their father and performed with him in 1954 and 1955 throughout Europe. The numbers played by Menendez and his sons consist of trumpet solos and trios selected from the classics and also include pieces composed by Mendez such as "Polka in the Box", the "Tre-Mendez Polka" and "Chunea". The album also contains other pieces such as "The Brave Matador" and "Cara Nome", which are Mendez's own arrangements.

== Track listing – original 1957 release ==
=== Side one ===
1. "The Brave Matador" (Celso Gascon)
2. "A Trumpeter's Lullaby" (Leroy Anderson)
3. "Chunca" (Rafael Méndez)
4. "The Tre-Mendez Polka" (Rafael Méndez)
5. "Chiapanicas"
6. "Cara Nome (from Verdi's Opera 'Rigoletto')" (Giuseppe Verdi)
7. "Polka in the Box (Rafael Méndez)

=== Side two ===
1. "Flight of the Bumble Bee" (Rimsky-Korsakov)
2. "Hejre Kata" (Jeno Hubay)
3. "Estrellita (My Little Star)" (Manuel M. Ponce)
4. "Dark Eyes"
5. "Hora Staccato" (Dinicu-Heifetz)
6. "Valse Bluette" (Richard Drigo)
