= Nyugen Smith =

American Artist

- Born: 1976 (age 49–50); Jersey City, US
- Education: Seton Hall University

Nyugen Smith (born 1976 in Jersey City) is an American artist and educator based in Jersey City whose works responds to the legacy of European colonial rule in African diaspora and considers imperialist practices of oppression, violence, and intergenerational trauma. Smith's work has been featured in exhibitions at key galleries and museums which include the El Museo del Barrio and the Pérez Art Museum Miami.

== Life ==
Smith was born in 1976 in Jersey City. He received a B.A in Fine Art from Seton Hall University in 2001 and MFA from the School of the Art Institute of Chicago.

== Exhibitions ==
- Dandy Lion: (Re)Articulating Black Masculine Identity, 2015, Museum of Contemporary Photography, Columbia College Chicago, South Loop, Chicago, Illinois, USA
- Saint Bowie, 2016, Stephen Romano Gallery, Brooklyn, New York, USA
- Relational Undercurrents: Contemporary Art of the Caribbean Archipelago, 2017, MOLAA, Museum of Latin American Art, Long Beach, California, USA
- Bordering the Imaginary: Art from the Dominican Republic, 2018, Haiti, and their Diasporas, BRIC Arts Media House, Brooklyn, New York, USA
- The Other Side of Now: Foresight in Contemporary Caribbean Art, 2019, Pérez Art Museum Miami, Downtown Miami, Miami, Florida, USA
- Estamos Bien: La Trienal 20/21, 2021, El Museo del Barrio, Harlem, New York, USA

== Awards and grants ==
- 2016 fellowship to Leonore Annenberg Fellowship for the Performing and Visual Arts
- 2018 Joan Mitchell Painters and Sculptors Grant
- 2018 Franklin Furnace Fund
- 2019 Visual Artist of the Year, Jersey City Arts Council
- 2021 New Jersey State Council on the Arts (Interdisciplinary Performance and Visual Arts Fellowship Award)
