= Brooklyn Cultural District =

Development project in New York City

The Brooklyn Cultural District (formerly known as the BAM-Downtown Brooklyn Cultural District) is a $100 million development project that focuses on the arts, public spaces and affordable housing in Fort Greene, Brooklyn, New York. The project reflected the joint efforts of New York City's Economic Development Corporation, the Department of Cultural Affairs, the Department of Housing Preservation and Development, the Department of City Planning, and the Downtown Brooklyn Partnership to continue to develop the Brooklyn neighborhood area. Joining the area's longtime institutional stakeholders (BAM, the Brooklyn Museum and the Brooklyn Public Library) are new homes for Mark Morris Dance Group, Theatre for a New Audience (TFANA), UrbanGlass and BRIC Arts and the BAM's Fisher Building.

The district, roughly bounded by Flatbush Avenue, Fulton Street and Hanson Place, has been developed since 2004 when 80 Arts/the James E. Davis Arts Building was renovated to be home to twelve nonprofit arts groups. After a series of stops and starts during which the district's future was uncertain, this was followed in 2008 by the opening of the Irondale Center for Theater, Education and Outreach in the historic Lafayette Avenue Presbyterian Church. Performing arts spaces, ISSUE Project Room at 22 Boerum Place, and BAM Fisher at 321 Ashland Place, followed in 2012 and TFANA's new building opened for performances in 2014.

Additional theater space that is home to Bang on a Can and Cool Culture opened in 2019, as did BAM Park, which was originally funded in 2014. BAM South, also known as 300 Ashland, developed by Two Trees provides affordable housing and an additional cultural component with homes for the Museum of Contemporary African Diasporan Arts, a Brooklyn Public Library branch and an expansion of BAM Cinemas to be known as BAM Karen.
