= BRIC (organization) =

Arts organization in Brooklyn, New York

Coordinates: 40.688557°N 73.979005°W

The BRIC House (2026)

BRIC, formerly known as BRIC Arts Media and originally as Brooklyn Information & Culture (and founded as the "Fund for the Borough of Brooklyn" in 1979), is a non-profit arts organization based in Brooklyn, New York. A presenter of free cultural programming in Brooklyn, it incubates and showcases work by artists and media-makers with programs reaching hundreds of thousands of people each year.

Its main venue, BRIC House, is located in the Brooklyn Cultural District and features a public media center, a contemporary art exhibition space, two performance spaces, a glass-walled TV studio, and artist work spaces.

BRIC's programs include the BRIC Celebrate Brooklyn! Festival in Prospect Park, a contemporary art exhibition series, and two distinct media initiatives: Brooklyn Free Speech, the borough's public access initiative, and BRIC TV, a non-profit community TV channel and digital network. BRIC also offers education and other programs at BRIC House and throughout Brooklyn.

In September 2025, BRIC became part of the city's Cultural Institutions Group, a partnership of cultural and educational institutions.

== BRIC House ==
Prior to the opening of BRIC House in 2013, BRIC programmed in a number of locations around Brooklyn, including the Rotunda Gallery in Brooklyn Heights. BRIC House, located in the former Strand Theater building on Fulton Street, is a 40,000-square-foot venue renovated by Leeser Architecture. The facility allows BRIC to present music, arts, and media programming under the same roof for the first time, featuring a 3,000-square-foot public gallery, flexible performance space, and artist studios.

Along with UrbanGlass (its upstairs neighbor), the Theatre for a New Audience, and the Mark Morris Dance Center, BRIC is considered a key component of the Downtown Brooklyn Cultural District, which also includes the three buildings of the Brooklyn Academy of Music.
