= Supergirl (2026 film) =

DC Studios film by Craig Gillespie

- Theatrical release poster
- Directed by: Craig Gillespie
- Written by: Ana Nogueira
- Based on: Characters from DC
- Produced by: Peter Safran; James Gunn
- Starring: Milly Alcock; Matthias Schoenaerts; Eve Ridley; David Krumholtz; Emily Beecham; David Corenswet; Jason Momoa
- Cinematography: Rob Hardy
- Edited by: Tatiana S. Riegel; Fred Raskin
- Music by: Claudia Sarne
- Production companies: DC Studios; Troll Court Entertainment; The Safran Company
- Distributed by: Warner Bros. Pictures
- Release dates: June 22, 2026 (Brooklyn Cultural District); June 26, 2026 (United States)
- Running time: 108 minutes
- Country: United States
- Language: English
- Budget: $170–186 million
- Box office: $126.4 million

Supergirl is a 2026 American superhero film based on the DC Comics superheroine Kara Zor-El / Supergirl. Directed by Craig Gillespie and written by Ana Nogueira, it is the second film in the DC Universe (DCU). Milly Alcock stars in the title role, alongside Matthias Schoenaerts, Eve Ridley, David Krumholtz, Emily Beecham, David Corenswet, and Jason Momoa. In the film, Kara embarks on a journey across the galaxy to hunt down an adversary who has harmed her pet dog Krypto. The film is produced by Peter Safran and James Gunn of DC Studios.

A film featuring Supergirl entered development as part of the DC Extended Universe (DCEU) franchise in August 2018, and the character was introduced in the 2023 film The Flash, portrayed by Sasha Calle. Plans for the standalone project were altered when Gunn and Safran became co-CEOs of DC Studios in October 2022, and they began work on the DCU as a reboot of the DCEU. A new Supergirl film was announced in January 2023 as an adaptation of the 2021–22 comic book miniseries Supergirl: Woman of Tomorrow by Tom King and Bilquis Evely. Nogueira was hired by November 2023; Alcock was cast in January 2024 to debut in the first DCU film, Superman (2025); and Gillespie joined that May. Filming took place from January to May 2025 at Warner Bros. Studios Leavesden and London in England, and in Scotland.

Supergirl premiered at the Plaza at 300 Ashland in Brooklyn on June 22, 2026, and was theatrically released by Warner Bros. Pictures in the United States on June 26. It is part of the DCU's Chapter One: Gods and Monsters. The film received mixed reviews from critics and was a box-office bomb, grossing $126.4 million against a production budget of $170–186 million.

== Plot ==
During the destruction of the planet Krypton, scientist Zor-El and his wife Alura evacuate along with many Kryptonians to Argo City, where Zor-El activates a force field system that separates a chunk containing the city from Krypton, preventing it from being destroyed when the planet's core explodes. Eight years later, Alura gives birth to their daughter, Kara. Eventually, it is discovered that the separation of Argo City exposed a mineral known as "Kryptonite", which is slowly killing the citizens via radiation. After Alura succumbs to Kryptonite poisoning, Zor-El decides to send Kara and her dog Krypto on a ship headed to Earth. Upon landing, they are greeted by Kara's cousin Kal-El, who is living a double life as Clark Kent and Superman. Kara later tries to adjust to her new life on Earth, while also adopting the moniker "Supergirl".

In the present, Kara travels with Krypto to several planets and parties in celebration of her 23rd birthday. Superman often calls her, concerned that she is constantly off-world and unable to settle on Earth. While stopping at the planet Holzherr, Kara encounters Ruthye Marye Knoll, the last survivor of her family who were murdered by Krem of the Yellow Hills, leader of a ruthless bandit group known as the Brigands. Ruthye requests Kara's assistance in her quest for vengeance, but is denied. Krem hijacks Kara's ship alongside several Brigands, and shoots Krypto with a poisonous dart when he tries to stop them. Upon learning that Krypto has only three days left to live, Kara decides to pursue Krem to retrieve an antidote that he keeps on his person, while also reluctantly taking on Ruthye as her companion.

After a brief skirmish with the Sklarian Raiders, a group of space pirates, Kara interrogates them and learns of Krem's location on the planet Bilquis. There, Kara and Ruthye learn from a local couple, Bomar and Mareck, that the Brigands have been kidnapping young women to force them to be their brides. Mareck attempts to drug Kara to trade her and Ruthye to the Brigands in exchange for their daughter Sarna, but Kara resists and fights the Brigands, and is assisted by the bounty hunter Lobo, who is targeting the Brigands' lieutenant Drom Baxton. Amidst the battle, Kara stops Ruthye from killing Krem, allowing him to escape after killing Bomar and his family. A guilt-ridden Kara decides to pursue Krem alone, and is escorted by several local aliens to the Brigands' location on another planet, Barenton. However, Kara is weakened by the planet's green sun, and is tended to by Ruthye, who secretly followed her.

Ruthye is later kidnapped by the Brigands and taken to their ship, where Lobo is also imprisoned. Ruthye manages to escape her cell and free Lobo, but is caught by Krem as she makes it topside. She is then saved by Kara, who has managed to recover after the planet rotates to a yellow sun and has donned her Supergirl suit. With Lobo's assistance, Supergirl defeats the Brigands and frees the captive women on board. She pleads with Ruthye not to kill Krem, convincing her that it would not ease her pain. As Ruthye walks away, Supergirl picks up her sword and uses it to kill Krem herself. She recovers the antidote and returns to Krypto, saving him in time. Later, as Supergirl bids farewell to Ruthye, she invites her to join her in celebrating the rest of her birthday week.

Some time later, Supergirl reunites with Superman on Earth, where she expresses a desire to stay for the long term, reaffirming that the planet is now her home.

== Cast ==
- Milly Alcock as Kara Zor-El / Supergirl: The cousin of Superman who was raised on a chunk of the destroyed planet Krypton and watched everyone around her die, making her a more jaded person than her cousin, who was raised on Earth by loving parents. Because Kryptonians are healed and gain powers from yellow suns, Kara likes to party on planets with red suns where she can get drunk. Producer James Gunn envisioned Supergirl as a "pixie-ish, but very attitudinal character". Both Gunn and director Craig Gillespie described her as being an antihero.
- Matthias Schoenaerts as Krem of the Yellow Hills: The leader of the Brigands, a group of space pirates and human traffickers.
- Eve Ridley as Ruthye Marye Knoll: A young girl who recruits Kara on her journey to avenge her family's death at the hands of Krem.
- David Krumholtz as Zor-El: Kara's father, who is a scientist on the Kryptonian city of Argo.
- Emily Beecham as Alura In-Ze: Kara's mother.
- David Corenswet as Kal-El / Clark Kent / Superman: Supergirl's cousin and a survivor from Krypton who lives on Earth as a superhero. Gillespie stated that his relationship with Kara can sometimes be "this almost older-sibling dynamic and that can be adversarial" and noted that whereas Superman is gentle and patient, Kara is uncertain.
- Jason Momoa as Lobo: An alien mercenary and bounty hunter from the utopian planet Czarnia. Momoa previously portrayed Arthur Curry / Aquaman in the DC Extended Universe (DCEU) from 2016 to 2023.

Members of the Knoll family who are killed by Krem at the beginning of the film include: Ferdinand Kingsley as Elias, Ruthye's father; Emily Piggford as Delilah, Ruthye's mother; and Bruce Lennox as Emond, Ruthye's brother. Additional roles include Diarmaid Murtagh as Drom Baxton, the Brigands' second-in-command; Clara Rosager, Heather Agyepong, and Alice Hewkin as the Sklarian Raiders; and Kadiff Kirwan and Thalissa Teixeira as Bomar and Mareck Vran, an alien couple on the planet Bilquis who provides Supergirl with information about the Brigands. Seth Rogen makes a voice cameo as Lloyd, a small alien Kara encounters on a space bus. Supergirl's super-powered dog Krypto also returns from the DCU film Superman (2025).

== Production ==
=== Background ===
Oren Uziel was hired by Warner Bros. Pictures in August 2018 to write a film based on the DC Comics character Supergirl. This came as Warner Bros. and DC Films were looking for new approaches to their DC Extended Universe (DCEU) franchise following several critical and commercial disappointments. Development on the film was in the early stages, but Warner Bros. was already being "very vocal" about wanting to hire a female director. The studio's shift to focusing on a Supergirl film was given as one of the reasons that Henry Cavill was no longer expected to portray Supergirl's cousin Clark Kent / Superman in future DCEU films after portraying the role since Man of Steel (2013); Cavill later indicated that he still wanted to return to the role. Production on Supergirl was tentatively scheduled to begin in early 2020, but was put on hold due to the COVID-19 pandemic.

In February 2021, Sasha Calle was cast as Supergirl for the DCEU film The Flash (2023) and signed a multi-film contract for the DCEU. Supergirl was included on DC's slate of films planned for release in 2022 or 2023. In April 2022, Discovery, Inc. and Warner Bros.' parent company WarnerMedia merged to become Warner Bros. Discovery (WBD), led by president and CEO David Zaslav. The new company was expected to restructure DC Entertainment while Zaslav began searching for an equivalent to Marvel Studios president Kevin Feige to lead the new subsidiary. Tatiana Siegel of Rolling Stone reported in August that Supergirl was unlikely to move forward under Zaslav, and it was quietly canceled around that time. Writer/director James Gunn and producer Peter Safran were announced as the co-chairs and co-CEOs of the newly formed DC Studios at the end of October. A week after starting their new roles, the pair had begun working with a group of writers to develop an eight-to-ten-year plan for a new DC Universe (DCU) that would be a "soft reboot" of the DCEU.

=== Development ===
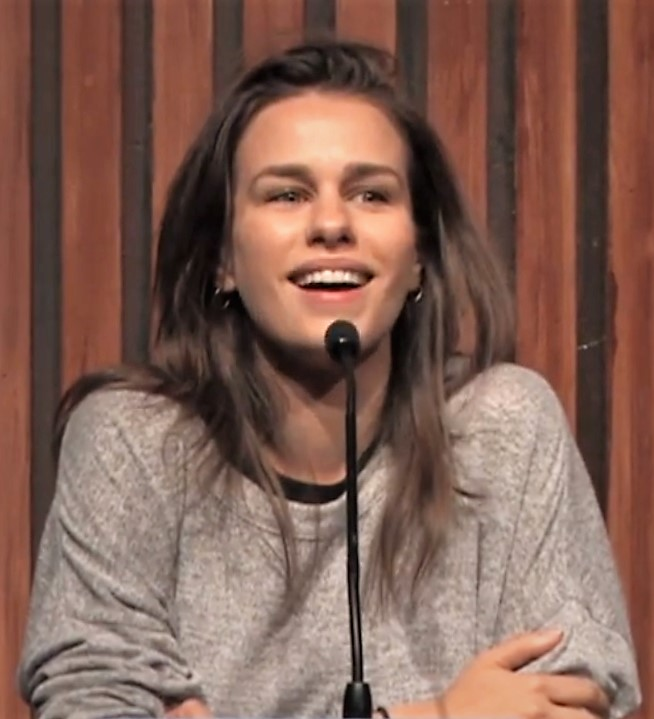
Ana Nogueira was hired to write a Supergirl film for the DCU by November 2023, after working on a planned Supergirl film for the DCEU.

On January 31, 2023, Gunn and Safran unveiled the first projects from their DCU slate, which begins with Chapter One: Gods and Monsters. One of the films in the slate was an adaptation of the comic book miniseries Supergirl: Woman of Tomorrow (2021–22) by Tom King and Bilquis Evely. Gunn described the project as "a big science fiction epic film" and stated it would explore a more "hardcore" version of Kara Zor-El / Supergirl than had been previously seen on screen. King was also revealed to be one of the writers working on the overall story for the DCU. Within days of the film's announcement, copies of the Supergirl: Woman of Tomorrow comic book had sold out on Amazon and at many different publishing houses and comic book shops. Gunn said he was working with DC Comics publisher and chief creative officer (CCO) Jim Lee to ensure more copies were printed soon.

While promoting the release of The Flash in June 2023, Calle expressed her love for the Woman of Tomorrow comic book and said she hoped to reprise her role in the film, but this was not guaranteed. She had met with Safran to discuss her future as the character by then, but Gunn eventually decided to move in a different direction with the character. Calle said she was heartbroken and frustrated with the decision because she had filmed a different ending of The Flash that was intended to set up future appearances for her character. She was proud of her work in the role. Following rumors that the DCEU's Aquaman actor, Jason Momoa, would be recast as the character Lobo in the DCU, he was reported in October 2023 to have had discussions with DC Studios about playing that character in the first DCU film, Superman (2025), or a standalone film.

In November 2023, Ana Nogueira was revealed to be writing the screenplay. She was previously attached to write a Supergirl film in 2022 when it was being developed as a spin-off from The Flash. Gunn and Safran enjoyed her work so much that they had her return for their own take, and she signed an overall writing deal with DC. Gunn confirmed Nogueira's involvement and called the film a "beautiful, star-spanning tale". He chose to move forward with it as the second DCU film after Superman, which was not originally planned, based on the strength of Nogueira's script. The film was reported to include the super-powered dog Krypto. Nogueira revealed that changes from the comic Woman of Tomorrow were already included in her initial pitch, such as Supergirl being the one to kill Krem instead of Ruthye Marye Knoll.

=== Pre-production ===
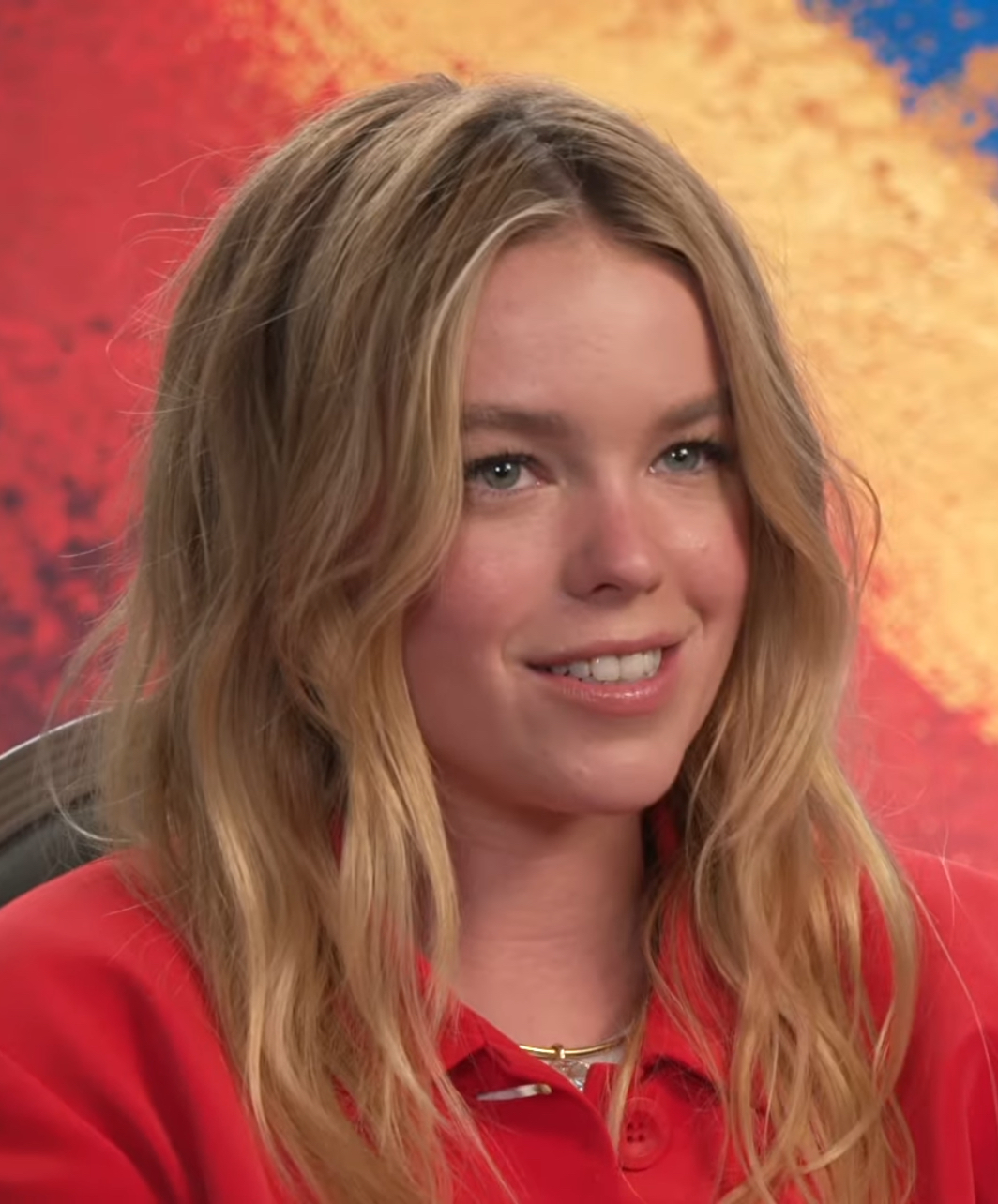
Milly Alcock was first envisioned for the role of Supergirl by producer James Gunn over a year before she was cast in January 2024.

By January 2024, Milly Alcock, Emilia Jones, Cailee Spaeny, and Meg Donnelly were being considered to portray Supergirl. Donnelly had voiced the character in the animated films Legion of Super-Heroes (2023) and Justice League: Crisis on Infinite Earths (2024). Jones did not read for the role. Alcock had a general meeting with Safran and was asked to make a self-tape a few weeks later. Alcock was conflicted about pursuing the role, wanting to "do things people watch" but also not be "pigeonholed into one part"; she was convinced after researching the role and realizing it emotionally resonated with her. Alcock and Donnelly had auditions and screen tests in costume on the Superman set in Atlanta later in January. Alcock was officially cast at the end of the month. Gunn said she embodied how King, Evely, and Nogueira envisioned the character, and he had first mentioned Alcock for the role to Safran over a year earlier after seeing her performance in the television series House of the Dragon (2022–present). Gunn believed she had the "edge, grace [and] authenticity" for this interpretation of Supergirl, which he wanted to distance from the more earnest portrayal of the character by Melissa Benoist in the Arrowverse series Supergirl (2015–2021). Alcock learned of her casting approximately 10 days after the audition when Gunn sent her an online article about the news. The studio was hoping to hire a director in the coming weeks, but prioritized casting Supergirl because the character was set to debut in another DCU project, reported to be Superman.

When Alcock was cast, filming was expected to begin in late 2024. She spent approximately two months during pre-production doing stunt rehearsals at Warner Bros. Studios Leavesden. Zaslav confirmed in February that the script had been written and further casting was underway. In April, Craig Gillespie entered talks to direct the film and DC Studios EVP Chantal Nong was revealed to be an executive producer. Gillespie said he was immediately interested in directing the filming after reading the script and seeing Alcock's performance, as he understood the "tone and what to do with it". His pitch to Gunn and Safran was heavily based on Nogueria's script, in addition to also providing 120 images as to what he felt the film should look like. He also enjoyed receiving creative freedom from Gunn, which they felt was necessary in maintaining the script's tone. He was confirmed as director the next month, when the film was given a release date of June 26, 2026. In September, Matthias Schoenaerts joined the cast as the main villain, Krem of the Yellow Hills, and filming was expected to begin in January 2025 in the United Kingdom. The next month, Gunn said the film would follow a three-act structure rather than the structure of the Woman of Tomorrow comic book, but it would retain the major characters and themes from the comic. He had reviewed screen tests for the character Ruthye Marye Knoll by then, and Eve Ridley was cast in that role at the end of the month. Gillespie included more scenes with Krypto during the opening credits, which were not originally written in the script, as he felt it would better develop Kara's relationships with Krypto while also establishing Krypto as "the only physical, tangible thing she has" from her life in Krypton.

In December, Momoa was reported to be portraying Lobo in the film. He confirmed the casting by referencing an interview from a year earlier in which he expressed interest in the role. While the character does not appear in the Woman of Tomorrow comic book, King's original pitch for the story was a team-up between Supergirl and Lobo in which they would take on similar roles to the characters Mattie Ross and Rooster Cogburn, respectively, from the novel True Grit (1968). Gunn said Lobo was added to the film to help with adapting it to a three-act structure. He felt Lobo was "the biggest comic book character that's never been in a film". Momoa's role was reported to be a cameo appearance. Anna B. Sheppard and Neil Lamont were the film's costume designer and production designer, respectively. The costume team based Krem's character design off of Woman of Tomorrow's descriptions of him as a Viking and on further historical research they did regarding piercings and studs. For Lobo, the team claimed they were heavily influenced by his comic book aesthetics in the 1990s and had opted for simplicity and faithfulness to his character. During pre-production, Gillespie and Momoa reviewed different designs for Lobo, which were criticized by some who believed they were created with artificial intelligence (AI). The cape of Alcock's costume was designed from 16 meters of the same material used in the cape of Christopher Reeve's Superman costume.

Gillespie noted how Woman of Tomorrow itself was inspired by True Grit, and incorporated that into the script while also citing Logan (2017) and John Wick (2014) as inspirations. Earlier versions of the script featured Supergirl wearing her costume earlier in the film. However, Gillespie chose to postpone it as much as possible because he felt it was thematically consistent with Kara embracing her responsibilities as a hero whenever she is ready for it. Meanwhile, Alcock felt Kara's choice to embrace Supergirl occurs after she understands it is about selflessly helping others. He also described Supergirl as being a "road movie" and as having a darker tone than Superman because Nogueira's scripts candidly dealt with the trauma Kara Zor-El had gone through during her childhood. It centers around Kara Zor-El's journey in accepting her heroism, and takes place in outer space, with Gillespie estimating that nine distinct worlds were featured, each with their own languages. He cited the 1997 film The Fifth Element for creating a world with a variety of distinct characters.

=== Filming ===
Principal photography began on January 13, 2025, at Warner Bros. Studios Leavesden and London in England. Rob Hardy served as director of photography, shooting Supergirl using the Sony Venice 2 digital camera paired with Panavision Ultra Panatar II anamorphic lenses for large format photography. Digital IMAX cameras were also used. Gillespie said the cinematography during action sequences would reflect Kara Zor-El's emotional state at the time, with anger being associated with "frenetically messy, aggressive kind of camera work" while her being relaxed would be associated with a "more fluid" style. An action sequence filmed in Leavesden involved practical 40-foot fireballs and Momoa using a real motorcycle while portraying Lobo. Gunn insisted that Gillespie film the ending that was originally envisioned in the script, even though Gillespie was willing to film alternate versions if it was not well-received during test screenings. The first scenes filmed during production was Kara's arrival on Earth, which involved Alcock and Corenswet interacting in the Kryptonian language. She had also learned five comic book languages for the film, while Gillespie estimated she spent an hour before filming to rehearse her stunts. Later that week, David Krumholtz and Emily Beecham joined the cast as Supergirl's parents Zor-El and Alura In-Ze, respectively; Beecham previously worked with Gillespie on the 2021 film Cruella. Other than the very beginning of filming, Gunn was not present on set and said Gillespie was a great partner who had "just been doing his thing". Gunn and Safran said filming was halfway done at the end of February. Momoa and Krumholtz wrapped their scenes in April. Filming was taking place in Scotland by the end of that month, and wrapped by May 10. Filming was also expected to occur in Iceland.

=== Post-production ===
Tatiana S. Riegel, a frequent collaborator of Gillespie's and an additional editor on Gunn's Guardians of the Galaxy Vol. 3 (2023), edited the film, alongside Fred Raskin, a frequent collaborator of Gunn's. Geoffrey Baumann is the visual effects supervisor, with visual effects provided by Digital Domain, Framestore, and Industrial Light & Magic (ILM). In June 2025, Gunn announced that the film's title had been shortened to simply Supergirl. By October, a test screening had quietly occurred at the Warner Bros. Studios Burbank lot with some Warner Bros. and DC Studios executives and personnel. The film was reported at the start of December to have a $200 million budget, which Gunn disputed; it was subsequently reported to have a net budget of $170 million. Journalist Jeff Sneider reported that another test screening had occurred during the week of December 15, 2025, and that it had received praise for Alcock's performance and featured several needle drops like Gunn's Guardians of the Galaxy (2014–2023) films for Marvel Studios. However, Sneider said the action sequences and Schoenaerts's Krem elicited more mixed responses; The Hollywood Reporter would later report that after this screening, DC Studios took control of the post-production process, enlisting the help of writer Jeremy Slater. Between November 2025 and January 2026, additional actors were revealed to be appearing in the film: Ferdinand Kingsley as Ruthye's father, Elias Knoll; David Corenswet reprising his DCU role as Kal-El / Clark Kent / Superman; and Diarmaid Murtagh as Krem's second-in-command, Drom Baxton. Sneider also reported that Seth Rogen had a voice cameo, later revealed to be an alien space bus passenger. Rogen previously worked with Gillespie on the television series Pam & Tommy (2022) and the film Dumb Money (2023). By early 2026, the studio decided to test screen two different versions of the film; Gillespie's cut which was 11 minutes longer and included more of the villain Krem, scored strongly on song choices, pacing and villain; the studio went with their own cut after test screenings showed it scored slightly above Gillespie's.

== Music ==
Ramin Djawadi was revealed to be composing the Supergirl score in December 2025, after scoring several comic book films and Gillespie's 2011 film Fright Night. He was revealed to have been replaced by frequent DCEU film composer Tom Holkenborg in February 2026, before Claudia Sarne took over as composer by the following month. The soundtrack was released by WaterTower Music on June 26, 2026.

Songs featured in the film that are not featured on the soundtrack album include: "This Summer" by Sleigh Bells, "Digital Tattoo" by Werner Neidermeier, "Le Temps de l'amour" by Françoise Hardy, "Catch These Fists" by Wet Leg, "Silver Lining" by Rilo Kiley, "Satin in a Coffin" by Modest Mouse, "Smile" by Wolf Alice, "(I've Got) Trouble in Mind" by The Limiñanas, "What Are We" by Winnie Ama, "The Girl from Ipanema" by Antônio Carlos Jobim, "Cheek to Cheek" by Ella Fitzgerald, "Safeword" by Halsey, "Care" by Hana Vu, "Roforofo Fight" by Fela Kuti, "Don't Speak (I Came to Make a Bang!)" by Eagles of Death Metal, "The Middle" covered by Kelty Greye and KidMotel from the original by Jimmy Eat World, and the "Original Superman Theme" by John Williams. "The Middle", which plays over the film's final major action sequence, was chosen after Gunn personally selected it out of approximately 45 songs that were in contention. The original plan was to have a cover version of "Girls Just Wanna Have Fun" by Cyndi Lauper, also chosen by Gunn, but this was scrapped.

== Marketing ==
Following Supergirl's introduction in the final scene of Superman, Gunn released the first poster for Supergirl in July 2025. It shows her leaning against the Superman logo with that film's tagline, "Look Up", graffitied to say "Look Out". Commentators highlighted the change in tone from Superman suggested by the poster, as well as Supergirl's coat, which is similar to one she wears in the Woman of Tomorrow comic book. Aaron Perine at /Film wrote that the graffitied tag line was a succinct way to indicate Supergirl's different direction and tone, and said the "whole rebellious angle makes all the sense [in] the world" following her cameo appearance in Superman. At a CCXP panel in Brazil in early December 2025, the film's logo and Supergirl suit were showcased. The logo's design was reminiscent of Corenswet's Superman emblem, rather than an earlier design used during this film's production that featured a yellow italicized typeface and a blue background, which Taimur Dur of ComicsBeat had determined was a placeholder design. Omelete's Guilherme Jacobs noted that the Supergirl suit design showed more wear and tear than that of Superman's, which was inherent from Supergirl's less careful adventuring; Matthew Aguilar, writing for ComicBook.com, felt the enlarged S symbol, modified golden belt, and reveal of the cape made for a "sleeker" presentation than that of the design from Superman.

Later in December, two short teaser previews and a poster featuring the tagline "Truth, Justice, Whatever"—a spoof on the catchphrase "Truth, Justice, and the American Way" that is commonly associated with Superman—were released online, while the first full trailer was screened at a private press conference in Manhattan, New York City–hosted by Gunn, Safran, Gillespie, and Alcock–days before its December 11 release. Variety's Antonio Ferme and Jordan Moreau felt that the trailer, set to "Call Me" by Blondie, and the earlier footage "made a clear case for how Alcock's Kara Zor-El will stand apart from her more optimistic cousin Superman". James Grebey of Men's Journal noted similarities between scenes in the second preview of Kara wearing headphones and listening to music and Star-Lord from Gunn's Marvel Cinematic Universe (MCU) film Guardians of the Galaxy (2014), while Aguilar felt the poster and footage "just radiate the aura of cool and confidence" of the character from the comics. Polygon's Jake Kleinman felt between the use of "Blondie", the outer space setting, and a space group that "look suspiciously like the Ravagers", "Supergirl looks way more like Guardians [of the Galaxy] Vol. 4 than a Superman follow-up" which was "concerning". He was hopeful upon release Supergirl would be "its own distinct take on the superhero genre" and not Gunn "fall[ing] back on his signature style". Rafael Motamayor of /Film speculated that seeing Jason Momoa's Lobo in the trailer was Gunn being "misdirecting" for marketing purposes, guessing that Lobo would replace a bounty hunter who Supergirl defeats early in the comic, and that his role in the film would be small to not infringe on the adaptation of the comic yet enough to "gauge interest in more Lobo appearances"; Kotaku's Ethan Gach praised Kara's line "[Superman] sees the goodness in everyone, I see the truth", wondered if Momoa could perform a distinctive characterization for Lobo as opposed to just being Aquaman again, and felt the visuals in the trailer were bland. Alcock, Momoa, and Safran discussed the film and presented an action sequence during the 2026 Warner Bros. CinemaCon panel. Warner Bros. and DC Studios collaborated with over 80 brands for a $100 million promotional campaign for the film. The marketing budget was reported to be $120 million.

== Release ==
=== Theatrical ===
Supergirl had its world premiere at the Plaza at 300 Ashland in Brooklyn on June 22, 2026, and was released theatrically by Warner Bros. Pictures in the United States on June 26, in IMAX. It is part of the DCU's Chapter One: Gods and Monsters.

=== Home media ===
Supergirl was released for digital download on July 28, 2026, before being released on 4K Ultra HD, Blu-ray, and DVD on September 8. The film was released on HBO Max on September 10, 2026.

In the United States, Supergirl topped Fandango at Home's weekly digital sales and rental chart for the week ending August 2, following its premium digital release on July 28. On physical media, it was the best-selling film for the week ending September 12, according to Circana's VideoScan tracking service, which compiles DVD and Blu-ray sales.

Following its streaming release, Supergirl ranked No. 1 on HBO Max's film chart in the United States. Internationally, less than two weeks into its streaming run, the film remained among the top three titles on HBO Max's most-watched list in more than 70 countries, ranking No. 1 in most of them. In the United States, it placed No. 2. Streaming analytics firm FlixPatrol, which monitors daily updated VOD charts and streaming ratings worldwide, reported that Supergirl held the No. 1 movie position worldwide as of September 21. Overall, the film topped charts across North America, Latin America, Australia, and Europe. Nielsen Media Research, which records streaming viewership on certain U.S. television screens, reported that Supergirl was the fifth most-streamed film between September 7–13, with 304 million minutes viewed. Between September 14–20, the film recorded 218 million minutes of watch time, placing fourth. Between September 21–27, Supergirl recorded 133 million minutes of viewing, ranking as the tenth most-streamed film.

== Reception ==
=== Box-office performance ===
Supergirl grossed $72.4 million in the United States and Canada, and $54 million in other territories, for a worldwide total of $126.4 million. With a net production budget of $170–186 million, the film reportedly needed to gross around $315 million worldwide to break even. Following its opening weekend, it was reported that the film was projected to lose the studio $85–125 million.

In the United States and Canada, Supergirl was projected to earn between $40–55 million during its opening weekend from 3,600 theaters. Estimates were lowered after the film made $13 million on its first day (including $7.8 million from previews). It ended up debuting to just $38 million domestically and $68 million worldwide. In its second weekend, the film dropped 76% to $9.6 million domestically and reached $100.5 million worldwide.

=== Critical response ===
On the review aggregation website Rotten Tomatoes, 53% of 377 critics' reviews are positive, with an average rating of 5.5/10. The website's critical consensus reads: "Milly Alcock brings a swagger to Kara Zor-El that'd make Krypton proud in this otherwise familiar origin story, dawning a promising new hero in the DCU who's still waiting for an adventure that matches her vigor." Metacritic, which uses a weighted average, assigned the film a score of 50 out of 100, based on 56 critics, indicating "mixed or average" reviews. Audiences polled by CinemaScore gave the film an average grade of "B−" on an A+ to F scale, while 52% of those surveyed by PostTrak said they would definitely recommend the film.

David Rooney of The Hollywood Reporter gave the film a mixed review, writing: "[...] Gillespie barrels through a pedestrian mainframe narrative that's basically True Grit meets John Wick meets Mad Max: Fury Road with the usual random assortment of needle drops," also noting: "Given [Australian director] Gillespie's history with films about spirited, rule-breaking women, like I, Tonya and Cruella, the failure to find emotional depth in the sisterhood of Kara and Ruthye is notable." Pete Hammond of Deadline Hollywood gave the film a mixed review, writing: "The special effects and relentlessly dark tone often get in the way of making this group rock despite the best efforts of Alcock who is a bit too quirky, playing Zor-El as somewhat reckless, headstrong, and not always put together." Owen Gleiberman of Variety gave the film a negative review, writing: "Kill Krem! Save the dog! Those are the motivations driving the entire not-even-interesting-enough-to-be-convoluted plot of Supergirl. Maybe that's why the movie is full of action yet numbingly flat."

In a one-and-a-half-star-out-of-four review, Tomris Laffly of RogerEbert.com called the film a "shallow blockbuster that never takes flight", as well as writing: "In the end, you can't help but wonder why the emotions of these characters don't pack as much of a punch." Clarisse Loughley of The Independent awarded the film two stars out of five, writing: "The mandate here appears to be to keep things as distinctly Gunn-esque as possible. In return, Superman's moodier, more cynical relative has been robbed of the chance to speak with her own voice. It's the superhero equivalent of a Vegas impersonator." Amy Nicholson of the Los Angeles Times criticized the film, labeling it a "hot mess" with a "too-terrestrial plot", and that it "thrives on chaos but settles for convention."

In a positive review for IndieWire, Kate Erbland wrote: "What makes Supergirl stand out [...] is its interest in staying small while asking some very big questions indeed." Peter Bradshaw of The Guardian gave the film three stars out of five, calling it "sprightly and sparkling superhero yarn", while also writing that Supergirl "isn't a perfect movie by any means", but said that "there are moments when you'll believe this franchise can fly." David Fear of Rolling Stone gave the film a positive review, noting that it "can go deep", and wrote, "This movie proves that you can take something that might seem esoteric or strictly-for-the-heads and make mass entertainment out of it without selling out completely." Leila Latif of Empire gave the film three stars out of five, writing: "Milly Alcock's hungover hero is delightful, even if the film never truly cuts loose."

== Future ==
In May 2026, Safran said that Alcock's Supergirl would have a major role in the future of the DCU beyond her return in the Superman follow-up film Man of Tomorrow (2027).
