= Song-and-trio =

Within classical European music, the Song and Trio form is often referred as Compound Ternary form. This is where one of the Ternary form sections can be subdivided into two subsections such as: I-II-I or A-B1-B2-A.

== Examples ==
- Haydn's Piano Sonata in C Major, Movement III
- Beethoven Sonata Op.2 No.1, Movement III
- Beethoven Sonata Op.14 No.9, Movement II
- Leroy Anderson Fiddle Faddle
