= Sklarian Raiders =

Fictional characters in the Legion of Super-Heroes

Publication information
- Publisher: DC Comics
- First appearance: Superboy and the Legion of Super-Heroes #233 (November 1977)
- Created by: Paul Levitz (script); James Sherman (art); Bob Wiacek (art)

In-story information
- Base(s): Sklaria/Sklar
- Member(s): Cyndra; Rdeena; Thela

The Sklarian Raiders are fictional characters appearing in the Legion of Super-Heroes comic books published by DC Comics, notably as a group of all female space pirates. Created by Paul Levitz, James Sherman, and Bob Wiacek, they first appeared in Superboy and the Legion of Super-Heroes #233 (November 1977).

== Fictional characters biography ==
The United Planets gave much of its technology to Sklaria, but the Sklarian Raiders believe it was just enough to destroy their society and put their world on the brink of chaos. In desperate need of high tech equipment for their homeworld, they resorted to piracy. They unsuccessfully attempt to steal an experimental Hypertime drive using force beamers and aerosleds from a group of Legionnaires while it is en route to their headquarters. They next attempt to steal a computer bank storing research of a life-extending serum from the Life Institute on an artificial island anchored in the North Sea and from Technos a biological lab on an asteroid permanently orbiting Earth by using a tractor beam from their starship.

A couple of years after making peace with the United Planets, the Sklarian Raiders use their embassy in Hong Kong as a front to smuggle frozen organs off planet until they are caught by the Legion Espionage Squad.

== In other media ==
The Sklarian Raiders appear in Supergirl (2026), with its members portrayed by Clara Rosager, Heather Agyepong, and Alice Hewkin.
