= Strand Theatre (Brooklyn) =

Coordinates: 40.68882°N 73.97927°W

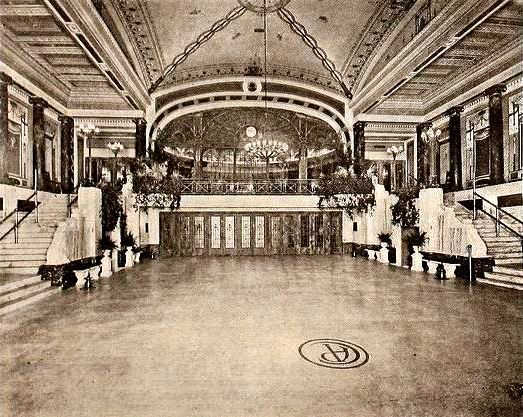
Lobby of the Strand Theatre in 1920

The Strand Theatre, sometimes known as the 1918 Strand Theatre, at 647 Fulton Street and Rockwell Place, adjacent to Brooklyn Academy of Music's Harvey Theatre, was a vaudeville house that is currently home to BRIC and UrbanGlass following a two-year renovation from 2011 to 2013.

== History ==
The theatre was built for vaudeville with a maximum capacity of nearly 4,000 by architect Thomas W. Lamb, and was constructed by the T.A. Clark Construction Company, and hosted talent including Houdini. Following the demise of vaudeville, it was converted into a movie theater. From 1920 to 1927 the theatre was managed by Edward L. Hyman, a popular exhibitionist that attracted audiences with his elaborate musical productions. The theater was affiliated with Warner Brothers in the 1940s prior to its sale to Fabian Theaters in 1948. In 1953 it became Alfredo Salmaggi's opera company's home. It also spent time as a bowling alley and a print shop. Subsequent to that, it was gutted internally and converted into a glass factory when the city took it over due to tax foreclosure, which it remained until early in the 20th century when UrbanGlass moved in 1991 and BRIC followed suit in 1993. When a printing company that operated on the first floor left in the mid 1990s, UrbanGlass and BRIC began discussions of renovating the space.
