= Edward L. Hyman =

American film producer

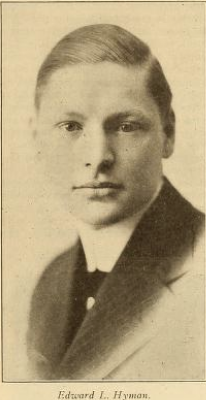
- A young Edward L. Hyman, from the magazine Motography, published in 1918.
- Born: 1894
- Died: 1984 (aged 89–90)

Edward Lloyd Hyman (1894-1984) was an early twentieth century theatre manager and innovator in the cinema industry.

== Biography ==
Born in 1894, Edward Lloyd Hyman began his career as a theater manager for the Victoria Theater in his hometown of Buffalo, New York, in 1916. He gained popularity for his elaborate productions of film during the silent era, most notable for his musical accompaniments that included: overtures, prologues, interludes, and countless other vocal and dance numbers. His success at the Victoria not only transferred, but increased when he was hired to work at the prestigious Strand Theatre, Brooklyn in 1920. He was later named the Vice President of Paramount Pictures after their historic merger with the American Broadcasting Company. He was responsible for acquisitions and dealt frequently with Walt Disney Productions.

== Victoria theatre (1916-1920) ==
Hyman became the manager for the Victoria Theatre in 1916, when he was just 21 years old. As the manager, he gained a positive reputation for actively communicating with his patrons about what films they wished to see the most. From this dialogue with his patrons he was able to construct his programs with the audience's desires in mind, which filled the house to capacity on most nights. He realized that the standard audience member was bored by the routine screening, and thus sought to include a variety of elaborate stage productions with each screening. Here, he first identified the importance of musical accompaniment, and spent the rest of his tenure as manager improving the sonic qualities of film exhibition.

He was one of the first exhibitors to treat his orchestra as an integral component of the production. Through discussions with his patrons, Hyman realized that musical performance was one of the most compelling theatrical draws. The sentiment was rather clear, the audience had much more interest in films that featured a strong musical accompaniment. In the past, exhibitors neglected the musical wants of their performers and audience, resulting in an unpleasant atmosphere for both parties. Orchestra members felt they weren't being utilized to their full potential, and audience members were frustrated and distracted by the lackluster performances. Hyman sought to establish a friendly relationship with his orchestra, and increase their role in the exhibition. As a result, the orchestra members produced more enjoyable music that accompanied the on-screen images. Giving the orchestra members a say in exhibition helped enhance the relationship between audio and visual elements in cinema at the time.

One innovation Hyman developed at the Victoria related to the exhibition of advertisements. Rather than spend considerable amounts of money on official advertisements, Hyman simply cut out film advertisements featured in Motion Picture News, hired a photographer to take pictures of the cutouts, and then projected these images onto his screen during intermissions. As a result, the Victoria had high-quality previews produced at a fraction of the standard cost.

== Strand theatre (1920-1927) ==
The Mark Strand theatre is where Hyman first garnished nationwide popularity. He was well known for introducing numerous musical and stage novelties, such as prologues, overtures, light shows, dance numbers, and radio broadcasts. He was very successful at securing popular musicians and dancers to perform at his theatre, namely: Charles Wakefield Cadman, Victor Herbert, Van and Schenck, Ben Bernie, Vincent Lopez, The Happiness Boys, and The Goodrich Silvertown Orchestra. Additionally, immediately following Gertrude Ederle's record breaking swim across the English Channel, Hyman was a key factor in bringing Ederle to the Mark Strand theatre for a personal appearance.

=== Musical Novelties ===
==== Prologues ====
Before the start of his features, Hyman would often produce an elaborate musical or dance number on stage. Prologues were frequently used in theatrical productions, but it was rare for them to be used in conjunction with motion pictures. His productions were universally liked by his patrons, which caused him to realize the importance of music in his programming. Additionally, many silent films were hard to follow, so the prologues helped explain the plot to the audience. Pictures of his prologues are included below along with original text published in the Exhibitor's Trade Review.

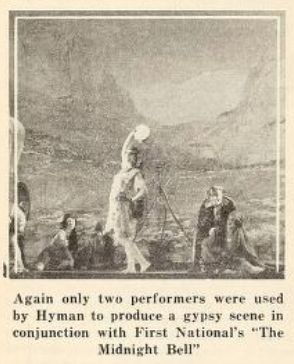
"Again only two performers were used by Hyman to produce a Gypsy scene in conjunction with First National's "The Midnight Bell""

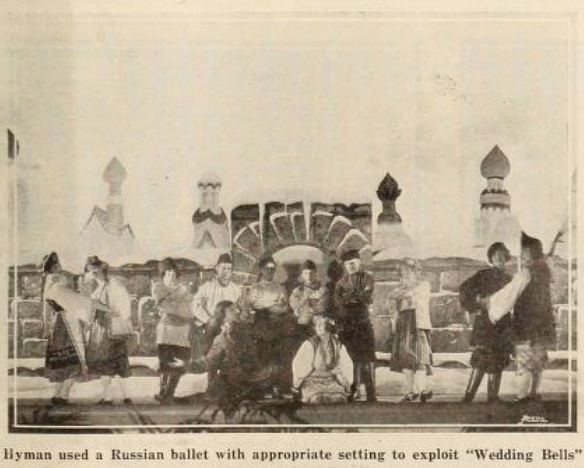
"Hyman used a Russian ballet with appropriate setting to exploit "Wedding Bells""

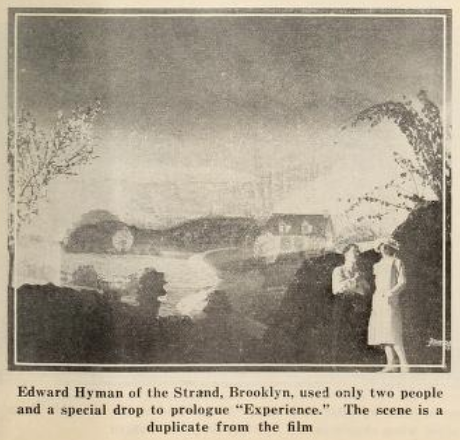
"Edward Hyman, of the Strand, Brooklyn, used only two people and a special drop to prologue "Experience". The scene is a duplicate from the film"

==== Overtures ====
Different from a prologue, an overture also takes place at the beginning of a film, but refers to the piece of music played before the opening credits. Overtures originated in European operas, but Hyman and other exhibitors adopted this practice to set the mood of their motion picture for their audience.

== Stanley Corporation (1928-1937) ==
In 1928, Hyman was promoted by the Stanley Corporation (a now defunct movie theater chain) to manage their theaters in Richmond, Baltimore, and Washington D.C., in addition to the Brooklyn Mark Strand. During his time with this motion picture chain, Hyman was active in film acquisition, securing performers, and in implementing up-to-date musical and cinematic innovations.

The Stanley Corporation was purchased by Warner Bros. later on in 1928. At the time, The Stanley Corporation owned one-third of the shares in rival film company, First National Pictures. This purchase reduced competition and enabled Warner to gain further control of the market.

== Paramount pictures (1941-1965) ==
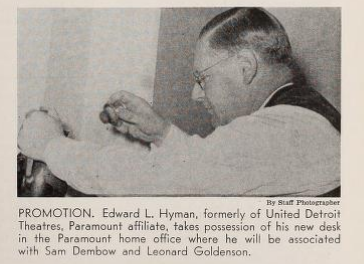
"Edward L. Hyman, formerly of United Detroit Theatres, Paramount Affiliate, takes possession of his new desk in the Paramount home office where he will be associated with Sam Dembrow and Leonard Goldenson".

After he resigned from his position with the now defunct Stanley Corporation, Hyman briefly continued to write publications for trade journals. Shortly after his resignation, Hyman joined United Detroit Theatres, an affiliate of Paramount. In 1941, he became affiliated with Paramount Pictures directly. Paramount operated both a theater chain and production studio until 1948, when the supreme court ruling United States v. Paramount Pictures, Inc. made it illegal for a single company to hold exclusive distribution rights.

=== Merger Between American Broadcasting Company and United Paramount Theatres ===
In 1949, during the eighth year of Hyman's tenure with Paramount, the company completed a merger with the American Broadcasting Company. He was named the vice president of the company in the following year. The company experienced great economic success after the merger, and was purchased by Capital Cities in 1985 for $3.5 billion in a monumental deal financed by Warren Buffett.

=== Vice President of American Broadcasting-Paramount Theatres, Inc. (1949-1965) ===
Following the merger, Edward Hyman was named the Vice President of AB-PT. As the VP, Hyman was responsible for identifying the most valuable films held by distributors, and connecting them with theaters in a timely fashion. He held the position until he retired in 1965, at the age of 71.
