= Verla Flowers =

Washington dance teacher

- Born: October 31, 1913
- Died: March 16, 2002 (aged 88)
- Other name: Verla Flowers Halladay (after marriage)
- Occupations: Dancer, dance educator

Verla Flowers (October 31, 1913 – March 16, 2002) was an American dancer and dance educator, based in Seattle, Washington. One of her students was choreographer Mark Morris.

== Early life ==
Verla Flowers was from Seattle, the daughter of Charles Herbert Flowers and Augusta Flowers. Her father was a machinist, and both parents were active in labor union work. She had a younger sister, Lorna; they performed as a child duet, and were known as the Halloween Sisters, because they were both born on October 31. She graduated from Ballard High School in 1931, and the Cornish College of the Arts, where she studied under Welland Lathrop.

== Career ==
Flowers began to teach dance when she was a teenager. For decades, Flowers was the proprietor of Verla Flowers Dance Arts in Seattle's Greenwood neighborhood, and trained generations of Seattle's young dancers. One of her young students was choreographer Mark Morris; she encouraged the gifted teenager to teach, to study ballet and fencing, and to create his own dances for studio recitals. Morris recalled her as "unbelievably fabulous, and generous, and supportive and great." When she retired in 1990, she sold her business mailing list to Elizabeth Chayer, of the American Dance Institute in Seattle and Shoreline, Washington.

== Personal life ==
Verla Flowers married Theodore Vernon Halladay in 1941. They had a daughter, Wendy Jean. Verla Flowers Halladay died in 2002, aged 88 years. A scrapbook from her childhood is in the University of Washington Libraries.
