= UrbanGlass =

Glass studio in New York City

UrbanGlass, located on Fulton Street in the historic 1918 Strand Theatre in the Downtown Brooklyn Cultural District is the New York metropolitan area's leading glass-blowing facility.

UrbanGlass was founded in 1977 by three artists and was originally known as the New York Experimental Glass Workshop. It is now the primary studio for more than 200 artists and hosts more than 500 art students for regular classes. UrbanGlass shares the Strand Theatre with BRIC Arts Media, which also reopened in October 2013. New to UrbanGlass upon its reopening in Fort Greene is the Agnes Varis Art Center, which is home to changing exhibits featuring the work of artists who work at UrbanGlass and others.
