= Alice Hewkin =

Chinese British actress

- Born: Jiangsu, China
- Education: Royal Central School of Speech and Drama (2014)
- Years active: 2007–present

Alice Hewkin is a Chinese British actress. She began her career as a child actress in the BBC film Sherlock Holmes and the Baker Street Irregulars (2007). She has since gained prominence through her work in theatre, television and film.

== Early life ==
Hewkin was born in Jiangsu, China, and was adopted at 9 months old in Cambridge, UK. Hewkin attended Hills Road Sixth Form College and trained in martial arts and piano, where she achieved Grade 8. She joined the Young Actors Company and performed at the Edinburgh Fringe Festival. She graduated from the Royal Central School of Speech and Drama with a Bachelor of Arts (BA) in Acting in 2014.

== Career ==
Hewkin made her television debut as Tealeaf in the 2007 BBC television film Sherlock Holmes and the Baker Street Irregulars with Jonathan Pryce, Anna Chancellor, and Aaron Taylor-Johnson.

In 2014 Hewkin returned to television in the Game of Thrones season 4 finale as Child of the Forest. In 2015 she appeared in the CBeebies series Teacup Travels and joined the cast of the Sky One comedy-drama Stella for its fourth series as Lily. Also in 2015, Hewkin made her professional stage debut with roles in The Vote at Donmar Warehouse, Hidden at the Royal Court Theatre, and Clickbait at Theatre503.

Hewkin starred in the titular role of the 2016 stage adaptation of Studio Ghibli's Kiki's Delivery Service at Southwark Playhouse. Also in 2016, she played Ling in the third series of the BBC Three sitcom Cuckoo. The following year, she appeared in the Doctor Who series 10 episode "Knock Knock" and portrayed Chinese-Trinidadian performer Jacqui Chan in the second season of The Crown on Netflix.

In 2019 Hewkin starred alongside Ella Balinska in the Sky Kids series The Athena and guest starred as Tanya opposite Lily Newmark as Ruthie in the first season of the Netflix comedy-drama Sex Education. She returned to Donmar Warehouse to play Clarissa Duke in Michael Lew's Teenage Dick.

Hewkin had a recurring role as Maeve in the Netflix series The Bastard Son & The Devil Himself in 2022 and her first named film role in Raine Allen-Miller's Rye Lane, which premiered at the 2023 Sundance Film Festival. In 2022 it was announced that Hewkin had been cast in the Netflix series The Brothers Sun produced by Brad Falchuk, playing twins May/June alongside Michelle Yeoh.

== Filmography ==
=== Film ===
Year	Title	Role
2017	The Mummy	Technician
2023	Rye Lane	Tabby
2025	The Amateur	Ali Park
2026	Supergirl	Sklarian Raider

=== Television ===
Year	Title	Role	Notes
2007	Sherlock Holmes and the Baker Street Irregulars	Tealeaf	Television film
2014	Game of Thrones	Wight	Episode: "The Children"
2015	Teacup Travels	Various	4 episodes
2015	BBC Comedy Feeds	Sophie	Episode: "Fishbowl"
2015–2016	Stella	Lily	7 episodes (series 4–5)
2016	Doctors	Chloe Everly	Episode: "Climb Another Mountain"
2016	Cuckoo	Ling	2 episodes (series 3)
2016	Soul Broken Sky	Daisy Meadow	Television film
2017	Doctor Who	Felicity	Episode: "Knock Knock"
2017	The Crown	Jacqui Chan	Episode: "Matrimonium"
2018	Stan Lee's Lucky Man	Sau Lam	Episode: "End of Days"
2019	Sex Education	Tanya	2 episodes (season 1)
2019	The Athena	Miju Lee	Main role (25 episodes)
2019	Strike Back: Revolution	Aang	Episode: "Part 5"
2020	Emily in Paris	Shay	Episode: "Family Affair"
2022	The Bastard Son & The Devil Himself	Maeve	4 episodes
2022	Miss Scarlet and The Duke	Miss Ling	Episode: "The Vanishing"
2023	The Brothers Sun	May and June Song	6 episodes

=== Video games ===
- CrossfireX (2022) as Sonia Liu

== Stage ==
Year	Title	Role	Notes
2015	The Vote	Carla Wu	Donmar Warehouse, London
2015	Hidden	Jun / Girl	Royal Court Theatre, London
2015	Clickbait	Chloe	Theatre503, London
2016	The Sugar-Coated Bullets of the Bourgeoisie	Xiaomei	Arcola Theatre, London
2016	Kiki's Delivery Service	Kiki	Southwark Playhouse, London
2019	Teenage Dick	Clarissa Duke	Donmar Warehouse, London
