= The Hard Nut =

1991 ballet

- Choreographer: Mark Morris
- Music: Pyotr Ilyich Tchaikovsky
- Premiere: 12 January 1991; Théâtre Royal de la Monnaie, Brussels
- Genre: Classical ballet

The Hard Nut is a ballet set to Tchaikovsky's 1892 The Nutcracker and choreographed by Mark Morris. It took its inspiration from the comic artist Charles Burns, whose art is personal and deeply instilled with archetypal concepts of guilt, childhood, adolescent sexuality, and poignant, nostalgic portrayals of post-war America. Morris enlisted a team of collaborators to create a world not unlike that of Burns’ world, where stories take comic book clichés and rearrange them into disturbing yet funny patterns.

Morris turned to Adrianne Lobel to create sets that would take Hoffmann's tale out of the traditional German setting and into Burns’ graphic, black and white view of the world. With these immense sets and scrims, lighting designer James F. Ingalls created a dark world within retro 1960s suburbia and costume designer Martin Pakledinaz created costumes that helped bring to life Burns’ world, described as being "at the juncture of fiction and memory, of cheap thrills and horror." The last of 10 pieces Mark Morris created during his time as Director of Dance at the National Opera House of Belgium, the piece was his most ambitious work at the time.

The Hard Nut premiered on 12 January 1991 at the Théâtre Royal de la Monnaie in Brussels, just short of the 100th anniversary of the creation of Tchaikovsky's classic score. Shortly after the premiere, the Mark Morris Dance Group returned to the United States, having finished their three-year residency at the Monnaie.

== Plot ==
While resetting the ballet in a 1960s-style American town and costuming it garishly and making the characters rather cartoonlike (the toy soldiers are an army of G.I. Joes), the overall plot of The Nutcracker was rather faithfully followed, to the point of including a pantomime version of "The Story of the Hard Nut," the tale-within-a-tale of E.T.A. Hoffmann's "The Nutcracker and the Mouse King" in Act II, to explain how Drosselmeyer's nephew was turned into the Nutcracker. This section is usually not included, not even in Tchaikovsky's original version. Princess Pirlipat is turned into a pig-snouted creature as a baby by the vengeful Mouse Queen, and Drosselmeyer searches the world for a way to break the spell, thus ushering the famous Danses caracterisques of Act II. The only one able to do so is Drosselmeyer's nephew, who, after biting a hard nut, breaks the spell placed on Princess Pirlipat, but is turned into a Nutcracker. Princess Pirlipat promptly rejects him, whereupon Clara (here called Marie) declares her love for him and the spell on Drosselmeyer's nephew is broken.

== Alterations from the traditional presentation ==
The Sugar Plum Fairy is eliminated as in the Baryshnikov Nutcracker, and Marie performs all of her dances. Her relationship with Drosselmeyer's nephew becomes romantic at the end and becomes a duet rather than an ensemble piece.

== Television airings ==
In the US the film aired on PBS stations in 1991 as part of the Great Performances series.

It was chosen the favorite by viewer votes in 2007, 2008, and 2009 in Ovation TV's annual "Battle of the Nutcrackers." Ovation did not include it in the 2010 competition.

== Commercial releases ==
The Hard Nut was released on VHS and Laserdisc in 1992 and on DVD in 2007. The DVD extras include "The Arabian Dance," segment which had been cut from the film due to time constraints, and Mark Morris's reflections on the original and ongoing productions of his version of the ballet.
