= Fiddle Faddle (musical composition) =

1947 musical composition

Fiddle-Faddle is a musical composition in 2/2 time composed by Leroy Anderson. It is considered to be a "light" classical music composition, sometimes referred to as "classical pops" music.

Fiddle-Faddle was published on January 1, 1947. Arthur Fiedler gave the composition its premiere on March 30, 1947 during a concert radio broadcast from the old Boston Opera House. Leroy Anderson conducted Fiddle-Faddle in a monaural recording for Decca Records on June 29, 1951. Anderson made a stereo recording of Fiddle-Faddle for Decca Records on June 11, 1959.

Anderson wrote the piece as one of a number of pieces conducted over time by Arthur Fiedler and the Boston Pops Orchestra. The finished piece instantly became a favorite of audiences and Arthur Fiedler alike. Fiedler programmed it so frequently in Pops concerts that the Pops audiences began referring to it as "Fiedler-Faddle". Written in classic "song-and-trio" form, it is based on the childhood nursery song "Three Blind Mice". It was recorded many times in the late 1940s and early 1950s by a variety of musical ensembles. As implied by the title the piece features the violins prominently with repeated semiquavers continued with pizzicato in what's seen as the Trio section.

The piece has been transcribed for concert or theater organ and as a duet for piano .
