= The Typewriter =

1953 composition by Leroy Anderson

Composition by Leroy Anderson and His "Pops" Concert Orchestra
- Written: October 9, 1950
- Released: October 1953
- Recorded: September 8, 1953
- Genre: Light music
- Length: 1:34
- Label: Decca Records
- Composer: Leroy Anderson

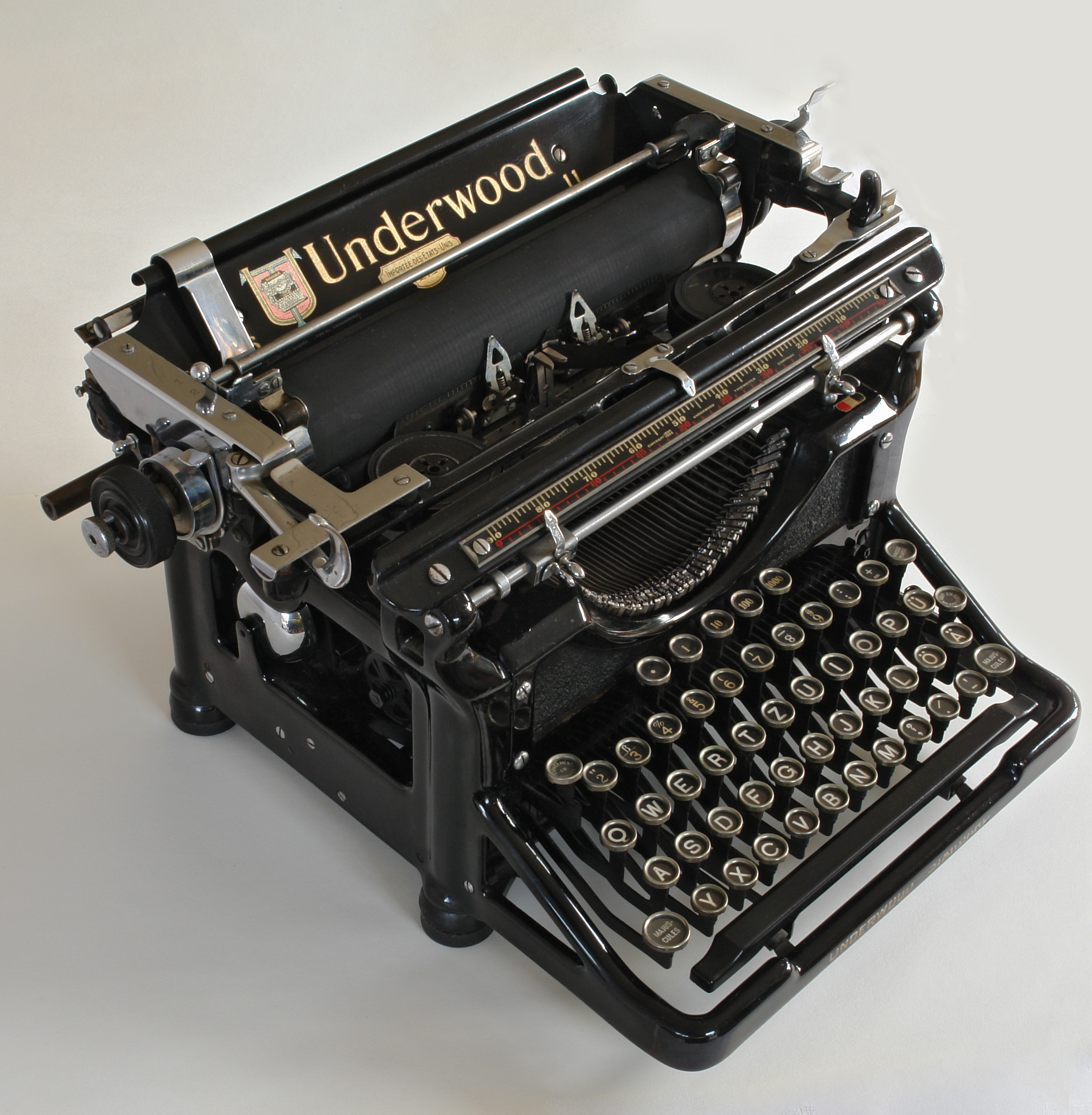
Typewriter

"The Typewriter" is a short composition of light music by American composer Leroy Anderson, which features an actual typewriter as a percussion instrument.

== Composition ==
Anderson completed "The Typewriter" on October 9, 1950, in Woodbury, Connecticut. "The Typewriter" was first performed and recorded for Decca Records on September 8, 1953, with a studio orchestra which Anderson conducted that was an assemblage of musicians from various orchestras in New York City, Philadelphia and Chicago who were hired for the recording sessions. Anderson composed the melody for symphony and pops orchestras; William Zinn and Floyd Werle arranged it for string orchestras and wind bands respectively.

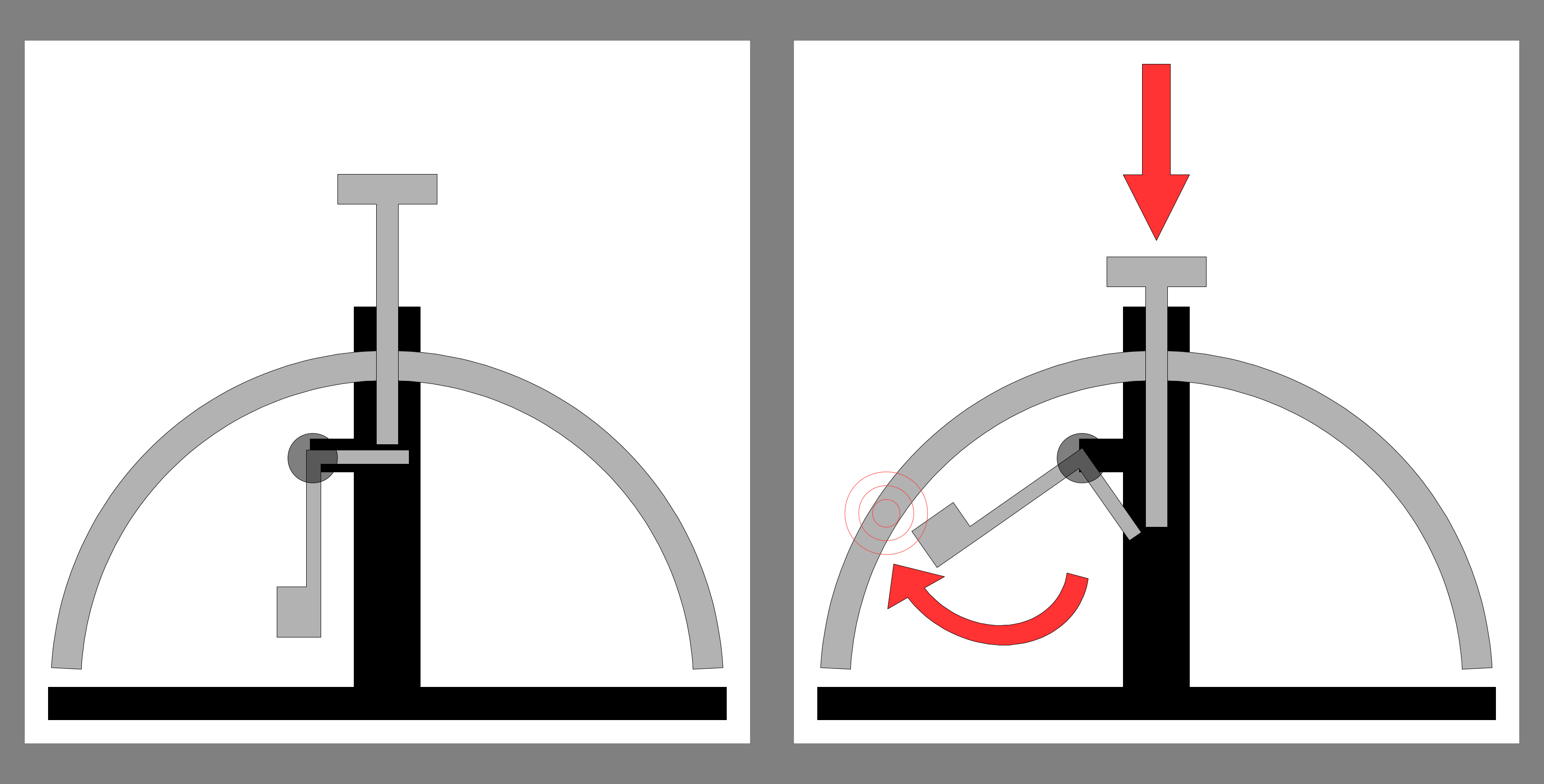
Bell structure

Its name refers to the fact that its performance requires a typewriter, while using three basic typewriter sounds: the sound of typing, the "ring" of the carriage return indicating an approaching end-of-line (a standard desk bell is used for it), and the sound of the typewriter's carriage returning. In some cases the sound of the typewriter's carriage returning is made by a musical gourd, flute, string or other instrument.

The typewriter was modified so that only two keys work to prevent the keys from jamming. According to the composer himself, as well as other musicians, the typewriter part is difficult because of how fast the typing speed is: even professional stenographers cannot do it, and only professional drummers have the necessary wrist flexibility.

It has been called one of "the wittiest and most clever pieces in the orchestral repertoire". Author Steve Metcalf has written that "Despite the almost total disappearance of typewriters in everyday life, the statistics show that 'The Typewriter' is still a favorite Anderson item."

The typewriter is considered a percussion instrument, and the typewriter part is usually performed by a percussionist or drummer, or rarely by the conductor.

== In popular culture ==
The piece was featured in the Jerry Lewis film Who's Minding the Store (1963) and in the musical montage that opens Lewis' 1980 film Hardly Working, although his first recorded performance was on a January 1954 episode of The Colgate Comedy Hour. The Radio 4 satirical programme The News Quiz adopted it as its theme tune (though in an arrangement not featuring a typewriter). It also plays during Max's first typewriter scene in the Adam Elliot film Mary and Max. It can also be heard in a scene in the film Christmas with the Kranks.

The piece was featured in the Warner Bros. cartoon show Animaniacs, in the segment "Temporary Insanity" in the sixth episode of season one originally airing on September 20, 1993. Yakko Warner, in the role of an office temp, mimes using an invisible typewriter to type up a drafted letter while an abbreviated version of The Typewriter plays; at the end of the song, he pulls the typed letter from thin air.

During Scott Mills' tenure hosting the Radio 2 Breakfast Show, the piece has been used as the background music during the "Good Morning Minute" segment, where Mills reads out what people are doing around the UK based on texts he received, for exactly one minute.

Comedian Bill Bailey performed the piece with the BBC Symphony Orchestra during the last night of the 2025 BBC Proms.
