= Rafael Méndez =

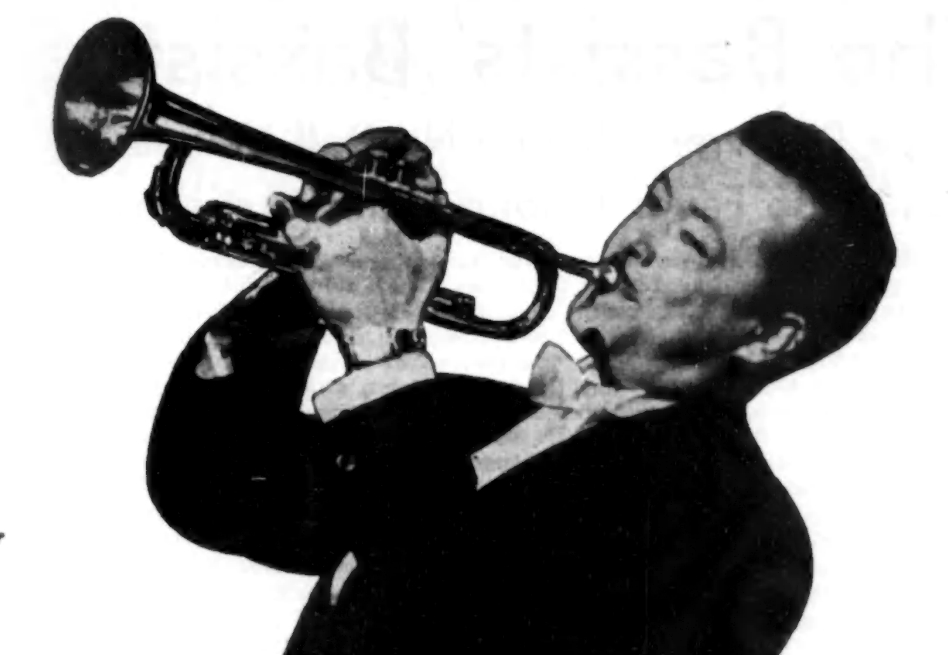
- Mendez in a 1955 advertisement

Background information
- Born: March 26, 1906; Jiquilpan, Michoacán, Mexico
- Died: September 15, 1981 (aged 75)
- Occupation: Musician
- Instrument: Trumpet
- Years active: 1939–1975

Rafael Méndez (March 26, 1906 – September 15, 1981) was a Mexican virtuoso solo trumpeter. He is known as the "Heifetz of the Trumpet."

== Early life ==
Méndez was born in Jiquilpan, Michoacán, Mexico to a musical family. As a child, he performed as a cornetist for guerrilla leader Pancho Villa, becoming a favourite musician of his and required to remain with Villa's camp. In 1921, he enlisted in the Mexican army and served in its orchestra.

== Career ==
=== Before music ===
Méndez emigrated to the US, first settling in Gary, Indiana, at age 20 and worked in steel mills. He moved to Flint, Michigan and worked at a Buick automotive plant as he established his musical career.

== In music ==
In 1939, Mendez joined the MGM orchestra where he played on several movie soundtracks and performed regular live concerts. By 1940, he was in Hollywood leading the brass section of M-G-M's studio orchestra. He contributed to the films Flying Down to Rio and Hondo, among others, and from 1950 to 1975, Méndez was a full-time soloist. At his peak, he performed about 125 concerts per year and he was also very active as a recording artist.

Méndez was highly acclaimed for his range, technique and unparalleled double-tonguing. His playing was also characterized by a brilliant tone, wide vibrato and clean, rapid articulation. His repertoire was a mixture of classical, popular, jazz, and Mexican folk music. He contributed many arrangements and original compositions to the trumpet repertoire. His Scherzo in D minor is often heard in recitals, and has been recorded by David Hickman.

He is regarded as the popularizer of "La Virgen de la Macarena", commonly known as "the bullfighter's song", to US audiences. Perhaps his most significant if not famous single recording, "Moto Perpetuo", was written in the nineteenth century by Niccolò Paganini for violin and features Mendez double-tonguing continuously for over 4 minutes while circular breathing to give the illusion that he is not taking a natural breath while playing.

== Personal life ==
Rafael Méndez married Amor Rodriguez after meeting her in Detroit. They had twin sons, both of whom became surgeons; Dr. Rafael G. Méndez, Jr. and Dr. Robert Méndez, and five grandchildren.

By the late 1950s, Méndez had been suffering from serious asthma-related problems which caused increasing difficulty during performances. His playing was also affected by an injury at a baseball game in Mexico in 1967. He retired from performing in 1975, but continued to compose and arrange.

He died at his home in Encino, California on September 15, 1981.

== Honors, awards, and legacy ==
Arizona State University's music building houses the 1,400 sq ft (130 m^{2}) Rafael Méndez Library which was dedicated and opened on June 11, 1993. The library holds 300 manuscripts and almost 700 compositions and arrangements by Méndez, as well as hundreds of images, articles and recordings. It also has an online counterpart.

In 2006, the Los Angeles Opera paid tribute to Rafael Mendez by performing a work based on his life. A reviewer in The Los Angeles Times believed that Mendez "has been called the greatest trumpet player of all time."

== Discography ==
- Concerto for Méndez
- Love and Inspiration
- Magnificent Méndez
- Méndez in Madrid
- Méndez Plays Arban
- Rafael Méndez & Laurindo Almeida Together
- Rafael Méndez (unplayed 4 disc set)
- Rafael Méndez and His Orchestra
- The Magic Trumpet of Rafael Méndez
- The Majestic Sound of Rafael Méndez
- The Singing Trumpet
- The Trumpet Virtuosity of Rafael Méndez
- Trumpet Extraordinary (1957)
- Trumpet Showcase
- Trumpet Solos Extraordinary
- Trumpet Spectacular
