= A Trumpeter's Lullaby =

Musical composition by Leroy Anderson

A Trumpeter's Lullaby is a short composition for solo trumpet and orchestra, written by American composer Leroy Anderson in 1949. The two and a half minute piece was premiered on May 9, 1950, by the Boston Pops Orchestra with Arthur Fiedler conducting and French-born American Roger Voisin as trumpet soloist. It was composed at the request of Voisin, who was principal trumpeter of the Boston Pops Orchestra at the time. It was first recorded on June 18, 1950, with Fiedler conducting Roger Voisin and the Boston Pops. Three months later it was recorded with Anderson himself conducting and James F. Burke (Musician) as trumpet soloist. The first stereo recording was made in October 1956 with Frederick Fennell conducting the Eastman-Rochester Pops Orchestra, recorded in one take without rehearsal. The (uncredited) soloist was Sidney Mear.

On the genesis of the piece, the composer states:

"(A Trumpeter's Lullaby)...had its beginning backstage at Symphony Hall in Boston. In addition to composing and conducting, I was arranger for the Boston Pops Orchestra for a number of years—and after one of the concerts I was sitting, talking with the conductor Arthur Fiedler and the first trumpet of the Boston Pops, Roger Voisin. Suddenly Roger Voisin asked me why I didn't write a trumpet solo for him to play with the orchestra that would be different from traditional trumpet solos which are all loud, martial or triumphant. After thinking it over, it occurred to me that I had never heard a lullaby for trumpet so I set out to write one — with a quiet melody based on bugle notes played by the trumpet and with the rest of the orchestra playing a lullaby background."

== Discography ==
External audio
- You may hear Leroy Anderson's "A Trumpeter's Lullaby" performed by Harry Freistadt and the Leroy Anderson Pops Orchestra Here on archive.org

A Trumpeter's Lullaby has been recorded by:

- Canadian Brass, "Noel", RCA Victor 09026-62683-2 (1994), (Adapted for solo tuba)
- Harry Freistadt, "Leroy Anderson Conducts", Decca 9-151 (1950)
- Al Hirt, "Jazzin' at the Pops", Pro Arte 687;
- Rafael Méndez
- Doc Severinsen, "Trumpet Spectacular", Telarc Digital CD-80223 (1990)
- Susan Slaughter
- Roger Voisin, soloist, Boston Pops Orchestra, RCA Red Seal 49-3049-B
