= The Syncopated Clock =

1945 musical composition by Leroy Anderson

Single by Leroy Anderson and His "Pops" Concert Orchestra
- B-side: "The Waltzing Cat"
- Written: April 1945
- Published: 1946
- Released: March 1951
- Recorded: September 11, 1950
- Genre: Light music
- Length: 2:19
- Label: Decca
- Composer: Leroy Anderson

"The Syncopated Clock" is a piece of light music by American composer Leroy Anderson, which has become a feature of the pops orchestra repertoire.

== Composition ==
Anderson wrote "The Syncopated Clock" in 1945 while serving with the U.S. Army and assigned as Chief of the Scandinavian Desk of Military Intelligence in Washington. Anderson had been invited by Arthur Fiedler to guest-conduct the Boston Popular ("Pops") Orchestra during their annual Harvard Night. Anderson wanted to introduce a new work to Fiedler and composed a song about a clock with a syncopated rhythm. The idea of the title reportedly occurred to him before he wrote the music. In a few hours he wrote the music, scored it for orchestra and then mailed it to Boston Symphony Hall. Fiedler had the orchestra parts copied from the score. Then, with a three-day pass, Anderson traveled from his home in Arlington, Virginia to Boston, where he conducted the premiere on May 28, 1945.

Anderson recorded the work for Decca Records in 1950 with the best musicians selected from New York orchestras. This was true for all of his recordings for Decca, billed as "Leroy Anderson and his Orchestra". Anderson's "orchestra" was an assemblage of musicians hired by Decca specially for Anderson's recordings.

The record entered the charts on March 23, 1951, and spent 14 weeks there, reaching number 12. A version by Fiedler and the Boston Pops Orchestra (released by RCA Victor Red Seal) entered on June 1, 1951, spent two weeks on the charts, and reached number 28.

Also in 1950, Mitchell Parish wrote lyrics for the piece, published with Anderson by Mills Music.

== Movie theme ==
A version of "The Syncopated Clock" recorded by Percy Faith in 1951 (released by Columbia Records with the flip side "On Top of Old Smokey") was noticed by the producers of a new WCBS-TV program called The Late Show, a nightly program of old movies that was the station's first venture into late night television. Faith's rendition was chosen as the theme music for The Late Show by WCBS and several other CBS owned-and-operated stations around the country, which helped Anderson's composition become a tune that many Americans could readily hum or whistle, even if few knew the name of its composer. WCBS would also use the Faith recording to introduce a weekday afternoon movie (The Early Show), a later-night movie offering, The Late Late Show, and when time permitted on occasion, The Late, Late, Late Show.

== Structure ==
The arrangement requires temple blocks to be used as the sound of the clock that is heard throughout, except for a brief section in the middle. The piece is in 4/4 time; the opening establishes a perfectly regular "tick-tock" accompaniment, beginning with a roll off the orchestra's staccato strike of an A chord, creating an expectation that it will continue. In the sixth measure, there is an eighth-note rest on the second beat, and two syncopated "ticks" are heard before the "clock" returns to its normal rhythm. As the piece proceeds, the "clock" continues to indulge in brief moments of syncopation. Some are expected by the listener (as the tune repeats the passage in which the first syncopation occurred); others are not, creating a whimsical and comic effect. The song's basic arrangement and comical effect makes it a favourite for school bands. In the bridge section, the sound of an old-fashioned clock alarm ringing goes off a few times. In the coda, a group of sound effects are heard, including a "BOING!!" heard before the last group of orchestral chords.

== Cultural references ==
In a sixth-season episode of the television series M*A*S*H ("Your Hit Parade"), the tune is played over the public announcement system during a particularly grueling session in the operating room. B.J. Hunnicutt references its use as The Late Show theme but mistakenly identifies it as "The Musical Clock." It also accompanied the "Silent Minute," a Michael Weisman-devised concept during the pregame coverage leading into NBC Sports' telecast of Super Bowl XX which was a one-minute countdown featuring a black screen with a digital clock which morphed into Roman numerals when it reached twenty seconds remaining.

== Other recordings ==
- Eileen Barton (recorded December 1950 released by National Records with the flip side "Lock the Barn Door")
- Rosemary Clooney, as a track on a 4-record compilation of children's music released by Columbia Records
- Ken Griffin (recorded April 1951, released by Columbia Records with the flip side "Red Sails in the Sunset")
- Perez Prado (as "The Syncopated Clock Mambo," 1951) (released by RCA Victor with the flip side "Broadway")
- David Rose and his orchestra (released by MGM Records with the flip side "Mask Waltz")
- Ethel Smith (Decca Records) in 1951.
- The Three Suns (released by RCA Victor with the flip side "March of the Cards")
- Orquesta Narváez (released by Tico Records in their 1975 album Reincarnation)
- Isao Tomita (released in 1982 by RCA Red Seal Records as the closing piece on an album primarily featuring the Grand Canyon Suite by Grofé).
