= Leroy Anderson =

American composer (1908–1975)

- Anderson on the CD cover of The Best of Leroy Anderson: Sleigh Ride
- Born: June 29, 1908; Cambridge, Massachusetts, U.S.
- Died: May 18, 1975 (aged 66); Woodbury, Connecticut, U.S.
- Education: Harvard University (BA, MA)
- Occupations: Composer; pianist; organist
- Spouse: Eleanor Firke (m. 1942)
- Children: 3

Leroy Anderson (/ləˈrɔɪ/ lə-ROY; June 29, 1908 – May 18, 1975) was an American composer of short, light concert pieces, many of which were introduced by the Boston Pops Orchestra under the direction of Arthur Fiedler. John Williams described him as "one of the great American masters of light orchestral music."

== Early life ==
Born in Cambridge, Massachusetts to Swedish parents, Anderson was given his first piano lessons by his mother, who was a church organist. He continued studying piano at the New England Conservatory of Music. In 1925, Anderson entered Harvard College, where he studied musical harmony with Walter Spalding, counterpoint with Edward Ballantine, canon and fugue with William C. Heilman, orchestration with Edward B. Hill and Walter Piston, composition, also with Piston, and double bass with Gaston Dufresne. He also studied organ with Henry Gideon. He graduated with a Bachelor of Arts, magna cum laude in 1929 and was elected to Phi Beta Kappa. At Harvard University Graduate School, he studied composition with Walter Piston and George Enescu and received a Master of Arts in Music in 1930. He and his brother played in dance orchestras on Scandinavian cruise ships in the summers of 1930 and 1931.

== Career ==
Anderson continued studying at Harvard, working towards a PhD in German and Scandinavian languages; Anderson spoke English and Swedish during his youth, and eventually became fluent in Danish, Norwegian, Icelandic, German, French, Italian, and Portuguese.

At the time, he was working as organist and choir director at the East Milton Congregational Church, leading the Harvard University Band, and conducting and arranging for dance bands around Boston. In 1936 his arrangements came to the attention of Arthur Fiedler, who asked to see any original compositions that he could use in his concerts as the 18th conductor of the Boston Pops Orchestra at Symphony Hall. Anderson's first work was the 1938 "Jazz Pizzicato", but at just over ninety seconds, the piece was too short for a three-minute 78 rpm single of the period. Fiedler suggested writing a companion piece, and Anderson wrote '"Jazz Legato" later that same year. The combined recording went on to become one of Anderson's signature compositions.

In 1942, Anderson joined the United States Army, and was assigned in Iceland with the U.S. Counterintelligence Corps as a translator and interpreter, writing as well as monitoring local news media; in 1945 he was reassigned to the Pentagon as Chief of the Scandinavian Desk of Military Intelligence. His duties did not, however, prevent him from composing, and in 1945 he wrote "The Syncopated Clock" and "Promenade". Anderson became a reserve officer and was recalled to active duty for the Korean War. He wrote his first hit, "Blue Tango", in 1951, earning a Golden Disc and the No. 1 spot on the Billboard charts.

His pieces and his recordings during the 1950s conducting a studio orchestra were immense commercial successes. "Blue Tango" was the first instrumental recording ever to sell one million copies. His most famous pieces are probably "Sleigh Ride" and "The Syncopated Clock". In February 1951, WCBS-TV in New York City selected "The Syncopated Clock" as the theme song for The Late Show, the WCBS late-night movie, using Percy Faith's recording. Mitchell Parish added words to "The Syncopated Clock", and later wrote lyrics for other Anderson tunes, including "Sleigh Ride", which was not written as a Christmas piece, but as a work that describes a winter event. Anderson started the work during a heat wave in August 1946. The Boston Pops' recording of it was the first pure orchestral piece to reach No. 1 on the Billboard Pop Music chart. From 1952 to 1961, Anderson's composition "Plink, Plank, Plunk!" was used as the theme for the CBS panel show I've Got a Secret.

Anderson's musical style employs creative instrumental effects and occasionally makes use of sound-generating items such as typewriters and sandpaper.

Anderson wrote his Piano Concerto in C in 1953 but withdrew it, feeling that it had weak spots. The Anderson family decided to publish the work in 1988. Erich Kunzel and the Cincinnati Pops Orchestra released the first recording of this work; four other recordings, including one for piano and organ, have since been released.

In 1958, Anderson composed the music for the Broadway show Goldilocks with orchestrations by Philip J. Lang. Even though it earned two Tony awards, Goldilocks did not achieve commercial success. Anderson never wrote another musical, preferring instead to continue writing orchestral miniatures. His pieces, including "The Typewriter", "Bugler's Holiday", and "A Trumpeter's Lullaby" are performed by orchestras and bands ranging from school groups to professional organizations.

Anderson appeared with the Boston Pops on May 18, 1972, which was broadcast by PBS. He conducted "The Typewriter" as an encore, and Arthur Fiedler played the carriage return percussive part. The Boston Pops used the audio of that performance along with some video in a tribute film to Fiedler.

Anderson was initiated as an honorary member of the Gamma Omega chapter of Phi Mu Alpha Sinfonia at Indiana State University in 1969.

== Personal life ==
Anderson married Eleanor Jane Firke in 1942. They raised two sons and a daughter, while living in a custom-designed house in Woodbury, Connecticut.

== Death ==
In 1975, Anderson died of cancer in Woodbury, Connecticut and was buried there. He was 66.

== In popular culture ==
For his contribution to the recording industry, Leroy Anderson has a star on the Hollywood Walk of Fame at 1620 Vine Street. He was posthumously inducted into the Songwriters Hall of Fame in 1988, and his music continues to be a staple of "pops" orchestra repertoire. In 1995 the new headquarters of the Harvard University Band was named the Anderson Band Center in honor of Leroy Anderson. The Leroy Anderson House in Woodbury, Connecticut has been placed on the National Register of Historic Places.

In 2006, one of his piano works, "Forgotten Dreams", written in 1954, became the background for a British TV advertisement for mobile phone company 3. Previously, Los Angeles station KABC-TV used the song as its sign-off theme at the end of broadcast days in the 1980s, and Mantovani's recording of the song had been the closing theme for WABC-TV's Eyewitness News for much of the 1970s. "Forgotten Dreams" was used as a recurring theme in the French film Populaire (2012).

"The Typewriter" was used as the theme song for Esto no tiene nombre, a Puerto Rican television comedy program produced by Tommy Muñiz between the late 1960s and late 1970s. It is also the signature tune for the BBC Radio 4 series The News Quiz, which has been running since 1977.

American comedian Jerry Lewis, dressed in formal wear as "Pietro Del Canto", performed "The Typewriter" as the typist in a sketch in an early television program. He reprised his performance in the 1963 motion picture Who's Minding the Store?, "typing" on an imaginary typewriter.

British comedian/musician Bill Bailey performed "The Typewriter" at the Last Night of the BBC Proms at the Royal Albert Hall in September 2025.

== Works ==
Orchestral compositions

- Alma Mater (1954)
  1. Chapel Bells
  2. Freshman on Main Street
  3. Library Reading Room
  4. Class Reunion
- Arietta (1962)
- Balladette (1962)
- Belle of the Ball (1951)
- Blue Tango (1951)
- Brunoniana: Songs of Brown (1947), a medley of Brown University songs
- Bugler's Holiday (1954)
- The Captains and the Kings (1962)
- Concerto in C Major for Piano and Orchestra (1953) (withdrawn by the composer, and released posthumously)
- China Doll (1951)
- Clarinet Candy (1962)
- Fiddle-Faddle (1947)
- The First Day of Spring (1954)
- Forgotten Dreams (1954)
- The Girl in Satin (1953)
- The Golden Years (1962)
- Governor Bradford March (1948) (published posthumously)
- Harvard Sketches (1938) (later renamed Alma Mater)
  1. Lowell House Bells
  2. Freshman in Harvard Square
  3. Widener Reading Room
  4. Class Day Confetti Battle
- Home Stretch (1962)
- Horse and Buggy (1951)
- Jazz Legato (1938)
- Jazz Pizzicato (1938)
- Lullaby of the Drums (1970) (published posthumously)
- March of the Two Left Feet (1970)
- Mother's Whistler (1940) (published posthumously)
- The Penny Whistle Song (1951)
- The Phantom Regiment (1951)
- Pirate Dance (1962) (optional SATB chorus)
- Plink, Plank, Plunk! (1951)
- Promenade (1945)
- The Pussy Foot Ballet Music (1962)
- Pyramid Dance (1962) (optional SATB chorus)
- Sandpaper Ballet (1954)
- Saraband (1948)
- Serenata (1947)
- Sleigh Ride (1948)
- Song of the Bells (1953)
- Summer Skies (1953)
- The Syncopated Clock (1945)
- Ticonderoga March (1939) (Anderson's only work written for concert band)
- A Trumpeter's Lullaby (1949)
- The Typewriter (1950)
- Waltz Around the Scale (1970)
- The Waltzing Cat (1950)

Orchestral arrangements

- Birthday Party (1970)
- Chicken Reel (1946)
- A Christmas Festival (1950) (original version was 9:00, later shortened in 1952 to 5:45)
- Classical Jukebox (1950)
- Harvard Fantasy (1936)
- A Harvard Festival (1969)
- Irish Suite (1947 and 1949)
  1. The Irish Washerwoman (1947)
  2. The Minstrel Boy (1947)
  3. The Rakes of Mallow (1947)
  4. The Wearing of the Green (1949)
  5. The Last Rose of Summer (1947)
  6. The Girl I Left Behind Me (1949)
- Scottish Suite (1954)
  1. Bonnie Dundee (published posthumously)
  2. Turn Ye to Me
  3. The Bluebells of Scotland
  4. The Campbells Are Coming (published posthumously)
- Second Regiment Connecticut National Guard March (1973)
- Song of Jupiter (1951)
- Suite of Carols for Brass Choir (1955) (seven carols)
- Suite of Carols for String Orchestra (1955) (six carols)
- Suite of Carols for Woodwind Ensemble (1955) (six carols)
- To a Wild Rose (1970) (arranged from the song by Edward MacDowell) (published posthumously)
- Old MacDonald Had a Farm
- Seventy-Six Trombones

Musical theater compositions

- My Sister Eileen (1952) (the music is lost)
- Goldilocks (musical) (1958)
  1. Overture (1958)
  2. Bad Companions (1958)
  3. Come to Me (1958)
  4. Give the Little Lady (1958)
  5. Guess Who (1958)
  6. Heart of Stone (Pyramid Dance) (1958)
  7. He'll Never Stray (1958)
  8. Hello (1958)
  9. I Can't Be in Love (1958)
  10. I Never Know When to Say When (1958)
  11. If I Can't Take it With Me (1958)
  12. Lady in Waiting (1958)
  13. Lazy Moon (1958)
  14. Little Girls (1958)
  15. My Last Spring (1958)
  16. No One Will Ever Love You (1958)
  17. Save a Kiss (1958)
  18. Shall I Take My Heart and Go? (1958)
  19. Tag-a-long Kid (1958)
  20. The Beast in You (1958)
  21. The Pussy Foot (1958)
  22. There Never Was a Woman (1958)
  23. Town House Maxixe (1958)
  24. Two Years in the Making (1958)
  25. Who's Been Sitting in My Chair? (1958)
- Gone With the Wind (1961)
  1. I'm Too Young to Be a Widow
  2. Fiddle-Dee-Dee
  3. This Lovely World

Vocal compositions

- Do You Think That Love Is Here to Stay? (1935)
- Love May Come and Love May Go (1935)
- The Music in My Heart (1935)
- You Can Always Tell a Harvard Man (1962)
- What's the Use of Love? (1935)

Organ compositions

- Cambridge Centennial March of Industry (1946)
- Easter Song (194-)
- Wedding March for Jane and Peter (1972)

Other compositions

- Hens and Chickens (1966) (for beginning piano)
- Chatterbox (1966) (for beginning piano)
- Melody on Two Notes (~1965) (for beginning orchestra)
- An Old Fashioned Song (196-) (for beginning piano)
- Piece for Rolf (1961) (for two cellos)
- The Cowboy and His Horse (1966) (for beginning piano)
- The Whistling Kettle (~1965) (for beginning orchestra)
- Woodbury Fanfare (1959) (for four trumpets)

== Discography ==
The following is a selected discography of original recordings by Leroy Anderson. They were released from 1958 to 1962 on 33 1/3 rpm discs, and later, on digitally remastered compact discs released posthumously. 78 rpm and 45 rpm discs from 1945 to 1962, and releases of identical recordings on different labels in U.K., Germany, New Zealand and elsewhere, are not listed.

Recordings by Leroy Anderson

- Leroy Anderson Conducts His Own Compositions (Decca DL 7509; 1950)
- Leroy Anderson Conducts His Own Compositions Vol. 2 (Decca DL 7519; 1951)
- Leroy Anderson's Irish Suite (Decca DL 4050; 1952)
- Christmas Carols (Decca DL-8193; 1955)
- Leroy Anderson conducts Blue Tango and Other Favorites (Decca DL 8121; 1958)
- A Christmas Festival (Decca DL 78925 (s); 1959)
- Leroy Anderson Conducts Leroy Anderson (Decca DL 78865 (s); 1959)
- Leroy Anderson Conducts His Music (Decca DL 78954 (s); 1960)
- The New Music of Leroy Anderson (Decca DL 74335 (s); 1962)
- The Leroy Anderson Collection (Digitally remastered from original Decca analog recordings) (MCA Classics MCAD2-9815-A & B; 1988)
- The Best of Leroy Anderson: Sleigh Ride (Digitally remastered from original Decca analog master recordings) (MCA Classics MCAD −11710; 1997)
- Blue Tango and Other Favourites (Digitally remastered original recordings 1950-1952) (ASV Living Era AJA-5481 (U.K.) 2003)

== Honors and awards ==
- Phi Beta Kappa, elected June 17, 1929.
- Music director, Harvard University Band, 1929, 1931–1935
- Gold Record, Blue Tango, 1952
- Member, board of directors, ASCAP, New York, New York 1960–1964
- Member, Music Department Committee, Harvard University, Cambridge, Massachusetts 1962–1968
- Goldman Citation, American Bandmasters Association, March 10, 1966
- Phi Mu Alpha Sinfonia, Gamma Omega Chapter (honorary member), Indiana State University, 1969
- Member of board of directors of symphony orchestras:
  - New Haven, Connecticut 1969–1975
  - Hartford, Connecticut 1971–1975
- Honorary doctorate (Ph.D), Portia Law School, Boston, Massachusetts June 1971
- Honorary doctorate (Ph.D), Western New England College, Springfield, Massachusetts May 1974
- Star on the Hollywood Walk of Fame, 1976
- Named to Songwriters Hall of Fame, April 18, 1988
- Anderson Band Center, Cambridge, Massachusetts, Harvard University, dedicated October 26, 1995
- Leroy Anderson Square, Cambridge, Massachusetts, dedicated May 31, 2003

== Bibliography ==
English

Books

- Burgess Speed, Eleanor Anderson, Steve Metcalf: Leroy Anderson: A Bio-Bibliography (Praeger, 2004) ISBN 0-313-32176-0
- Howard Pollack, Harvard Composers – Walter Piston and his Students (The Scarecrow Press, 1992) ISBN 0-8108-2493-0
- Edward Jablonski, The Encyclopedia of American Music (Doubleday & Co., Inc. 1981) ISBN 0-385-08088-3
- George McCue, Music in American Society 1776–1976 (Transaction Books., 1977) ISBN 978-0-87855-634-2
- Christopher Pavlakis, The American Music Handbook (MacMillan Publishing Co., Inc., 1974) ISBN 0-385-08088-3
- David Ewen, Popular American Composers – from Revolutionary Times to the Present (H.W. Wilson Co., 1962)
- Jan-Erik Ander & Jeremy Lamb (translator): New Sweden 1638–1988 (Swedish National Committee for New Sweden '88, 1992) ISBN 91-7176-146-2
- Steven Ledbetter: 100 Years of the Boston Pops (Boston Symphony Orchestra, Inc., 1985)

Periodicals

- Joseph Smith: Leroy Anderson – Scandinavian Review (American-Scandinavian Foundation, 2009)
- Eliot Spalding: Vita: Leroy Anderson (Harvard Review, 1993)
- Janet Frank: Syncopated Clock, Indeed! (The American Scholar – Phi Beta Kappa Society, 2008)
- Jane Anderson Vercelli: Composer Leroy Anderson: Cambridge Born and Bred (The Newetowne Chronicle – Cambridge Historical Society, 2008)
- Joanne Kaufmann: Leroy Anderson: Tuneful Blade Runner (Wall Street Journal, 1995)
- Anthony Tommasini: Tuneful Gems from a Master: Leroy Anderson (New York Times, 1996)
- Frederick Fennell: Music by Leroy Anderson (The Instrumentalist, 1990)
- Anders Neumueller, editor: Leroy Anderson (Swedish Press Society, 1994)
- Andrew & Martha Sherman, editors: Annual Report dedication to Leroy Anderson (Town of Woodbury, 2008)
- Anthony Tommasini: Not Bach or Beethoven, but Leroy Anderson Is the Composer for Now (New York Times, April 22, 2020)

Swedish

- Svea: Svenskättling Berömd Amerikansk Kompositör; Worcester, Massachusetts USA; (Svea Publishing Company, weekly Swedish American newspaper, November 10, 1949)
- Norra Strö Hembygdsförening: Norra Strö: Bygden och Folket (Norra Strö Hembygdsförening, 2009) – documentation of Leroy Anderson's parents birthplaces in Sweden
- Carin Dohlman: Leroy Andersons Julmusik; Wellesley, Massachusetts USA; (Gult och Blatt i Boston-New England, 2009)

German

- Hans-Walter Berg: Leroy Anderson: ein Meister der Miniatur; Buchloe, Germany; (Neue Blasmusik, 1992)
