= Theatre for a New Audience =

Off-Broadway theater

Coordinates: 40.687333°N 73.978528°W

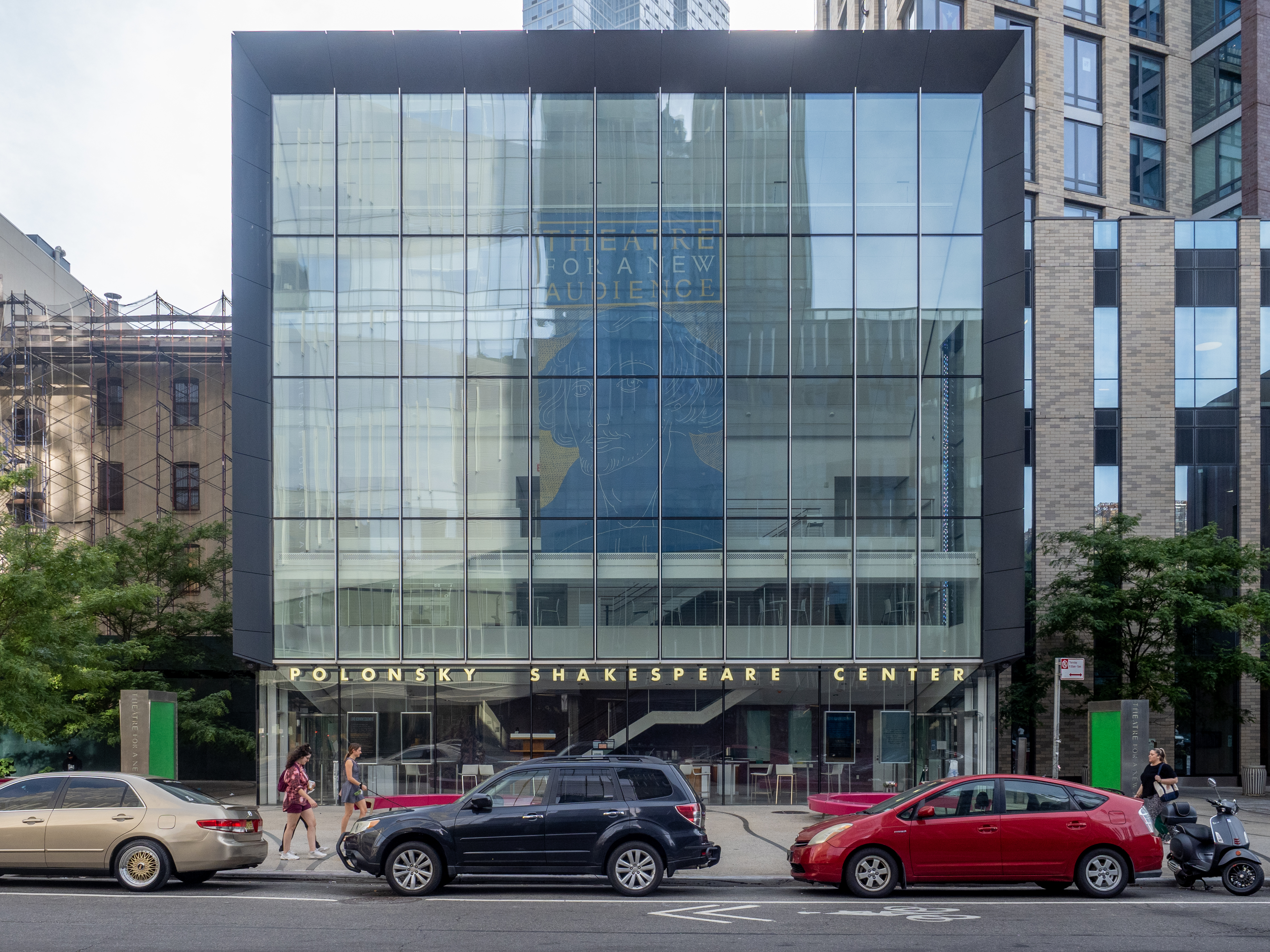
Current home of Theatre for a New Audience on Ashland Place in Downtown Brooklyn.

The Theatre for a New Audience (TFANA) is a non-profit theater in New York City focused on producing Shakespeare and other classic dramas. Its off-Broadway productions have toured in the U.S. and internationally.

== History ==
Theatre for a New Audience was founded in 1979 by Jeffrey Horowitz with the mission of creating contemporary productions of Shakespeare and other works considered classics in the theatrical canon that would appeal to more diverse audiences.

TFANA moved to a new building in 2013 at 262 Ashland Place in Brooklyn, New York. The theatre is named Polonsky Shakespeare Center. In this new location, it is part of an arts and entertainment district in the neighborhood of Fort Greene alongside the Mark Morris Dance Center, the Barclays Center, and the several buildings of the Brooklyn Academy of Music. The new building opened with a premiere of Julie Taymor's production of A Midsummer Night's Dream. Taymor had previously directed Titus Andronicus for TFANA in 1994.

In 2017, TFANA received a Ross Wetzseon Award at the Obie Awards presented by the American Theatre Wing and The Village Voice.

On August 31, 2025 Jeffrey Horowitz stepped down from his position as Founding Artistic Director for TFANA after a 46 year tenure. The theater moved to a dual leadership model, with Arin Arbus stepping into the role of Artistic Director, while longtime managing director Dorothy Ryan stepped into the role of Executive Director.
