= Mark Morris (choreographer) =

American dancer, choreographer and director (born 1956)

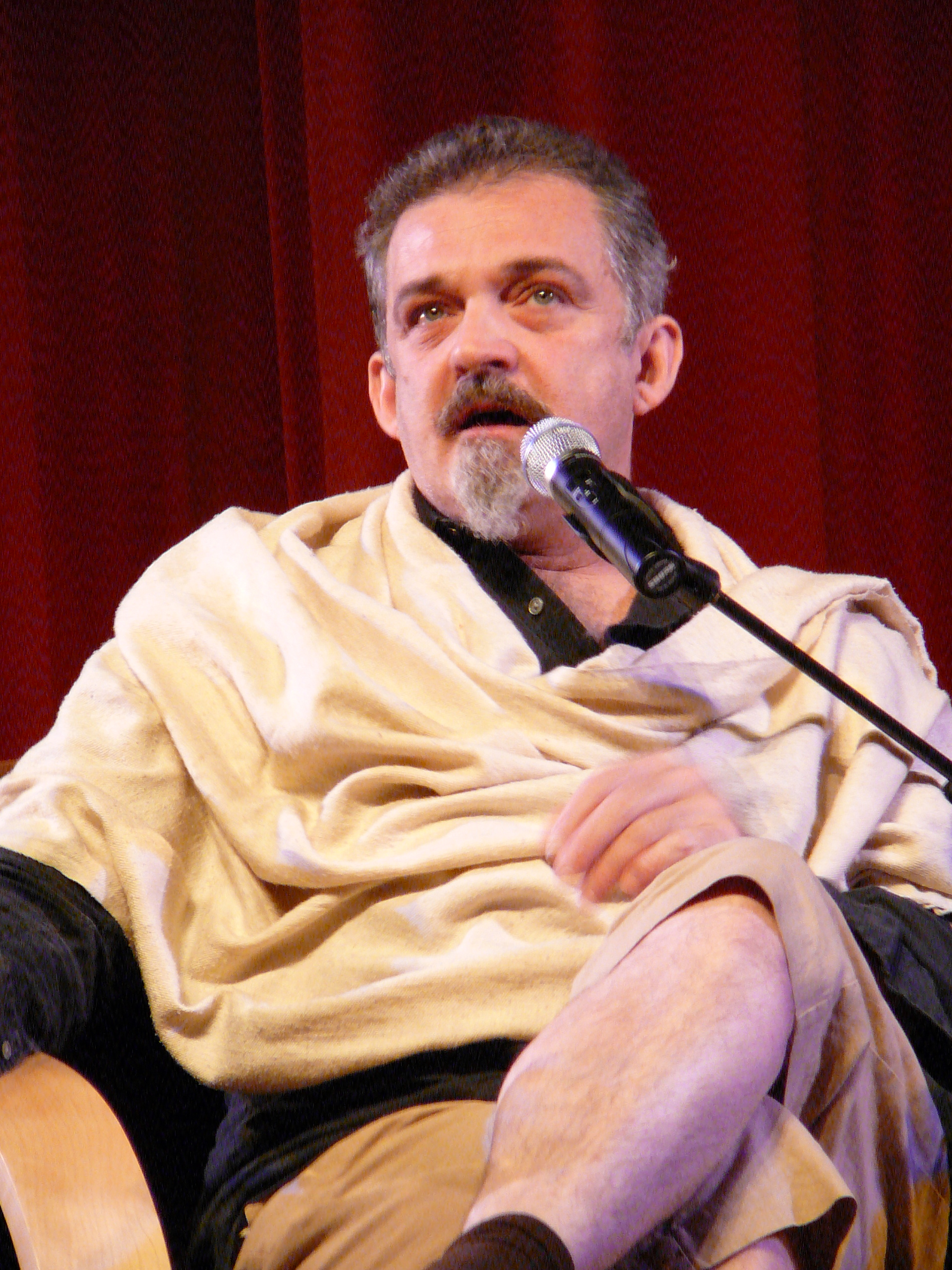
- Mark Morris in 2006
- Born: Mark William Morris; August 29, 1956 (age 70); Seattle, Washington, U.S.
- Occupations: Artistic director, dancer, choreographer, conductor, opera director
- Website: markmorrisdancegroup.org

Mark William Morris (born August 29, 1956) is an American dancer, choreographer and director.

== Early years ==
Morris grew up in Seattle, Washington, in a family that appreciated music and dance and nurtured his budding talents; his father Joe taught him to read music and his mother Maxine introduced him to flamenco and ballet. Joe was a high school teacher while Maxine cared for the children at home. Morris had two older sisters, Marianne and Maureen. Everyone in his family were performers, playing instruments, singing in chorus, and dancing. In grade school Morris's neighborhood population changed, with many Black and Asian families moving in, and many white families moving out, with exceptions such as the Morrises. This led to flourishing art from many different cultures, including a Japanese Bon Odori festival, as well as a Samoan dance ensemble at Morris's high school, influencing Morris's later interest in dance cultures outside of Western dance. He began Spanish dance training with Verla Flowers at age eight. Flowers also introduced Morris to ballet, which was considered an effeminate art form even then. He also participated in a folk dance group, the Koleda Folk Ensemble, for many years of his childhood, which is said to have had a profound effect on his later choreography. Throughout Morris's childhood he experienced discrimination for appearing effeminate, which contributed to much of his later choreography. Koleda had a variety of sexual identities and orientations, which is why it was so important to him. By age 14 he had choreographed his first modern piece, and by 15 his first ballet piece. When Morris was 16, his father died. His father's death and their relationship contributed to Morris's later piece Dad's Charts. After graduating from high school, Morris moved to Madrid to study flamenco with the goal of becoming a Spanish dancer, and briefly toured with the Royal Chamber Ballet of Madrid. He returned home to Seattle after five months, having experienced ongoing discrimination in Spain for being gay. He then trained for a year and a half with Perry Brunson, formerly of the Joffrey Ballet. He then moved to New York at 19 to begin his career as a choreographer. Once in New York he danced with choreographers Eliot Feld, Lar Lubovitch, Laura Dean and Hannah Kahn. By 1980 he launched his company with ten dancers.

== Career ==
On November 28, 1980, Morris got together a group of his friends and put on a performance of his own choreography and called them the Mark Morris Dance Group. For the first several years, the company gave just two annual performances—at On the Boards in Seattle, Washington, and at Dance Theater Workshop in New York. In 1984 he was invited to The American Dance Festival as part of the young choreographers and composers program. In 1986, the company was featured on the nationally televised Great Performances – Dance in America series on PBS.

In 1988, Morris was approached by Gerard Mortier, then the head of the Théâtre Royal de la Monnaie in Brussels. Mortier needed a replacement when Maurice Béjart, who had held the position of Director of Dance for over 20 years, suddenly left and took his company with him. After seeing the Mark Morris Dance Group give one performance, Mortier offered Morris the position. His company, from 1988 to 1991, became the Monnaie Dance Group Mark Morris, the resident company at la Monnaie where Morris was given well-equipped offices and studios; full health insurance for him, his staff and dancers; an orchestra and chorus at his disposal; and one of the great stages of Europe on which to dance.

In 1990, Morris and Mikhail Baryshnikov established the White Oak Dance Project. He continued to create works for this company until 1995.

In 1995, Morris choreographed a work for 14 dancers called World Power. For this work, Morris drew inspiration from a piece of text by Mark Twain in which Twain expresses his thoughts on the U.S. invasion of the Philippines in 1899, 65 years before the Gulf of Tonkin resolution heralded the United States' deepening involvement in Vietnam. The work is set to Lou Harrison's gamelan, trumpet and chorus work In Honor of Mr. Handel and In Honor of Mark Twain. In "Homage to the Pacifica", Harrison included the following passage by Twain:

We have pacified some thousands of the islanders and buried them, destroyed their fields; burned their villages, and turned their widows and orphans out-of-doors; furnished heartbreak by exile to some dozens of disagreeable patriots: subjugated the remaining ten millions by Benevolent Assimilation, which is the pious new name of the musket; we have acquired property in the three hundred concubines and other slaves of our business partner, the Sultan of Sulu, and hoisted our protecting flag over that swag. And so, by these Providences of God—and the phrase is the government's, not mine—we are a World Power.

In addition to using traditional Indonesian gamelan music, Morris studied Indonesian dance, Indonesian puppet theater (wayang kulit) and traditional Javanese court dances, such as the bedhaya and serimpi, extensively borrowing movements, formation patterns and hand gestures from the dances for this work. The music is largely Asian and includes instruments such as the bamboo flute, metallophone and bronze pot gongs.

Due to its strong political message of American and Western imperialism and explicit lyrics and choreography depicting violence against/conquering of indigenous people, World Power is seen as one of Morris's more controversial pieces. The finale contains images of distinct unease: an impatient stamping motif and verses ending with a retreat into the wings, heads tilting backwards, dancers falling down and being dragged on the floor and hands shielding faces, as if in horror.

Morris is also a ballet choreographer, most notably with the San Francisco Ballet, for which he has created eight works. He has also received commissions from such companies as American Ballet Theatre, Boston Ballet, and the Paris Opera Ballet. He has worked extensively in opera, directing and choreographing productions for the Metropolitan Opera, the New York City Opera, English National Opera, and the Royal Opera House, Covent Garden, among others. He directed and choreographed King Arthur for English National Opera in June 2006, and in May 2007 he directed and choreographed Orfeo ed Euridice for the Metropolitan Opera.

He is the recipient of 11 honorary doctorates.

Notable works by Morris include Gloria (1981), set to Vivaldi's "Gloria"; Championship Wrestling (1985), based on an essay by Roland Barthes; L'Allegro, il Penseroso ed il Moderato (1988); Dido and Aeneas (1989); The Hard Nut (1991), his version of The Nutcracker set in the 1970s; Grand Duo (1993); The Office (1995); Greek to Me (2000); a dance version of the Virgil Thomson–Gertrude Stein opera Four Saints in Three Acts (2001); the ballet A Garden (2001); V (2002) and All Fours (2004). In 2006, he premiered his Mozart Dances, commissioned by the New Crowned Hope Festival and Mostly Mozart Festival in conjunction with the 250th anniversary of the birth of Mozart; and in 2008, his controversial Romeo & Juliet, On Motifs of Shakespeare, set to Prokofiev's recently discovered, original scenario and score, had its premiere. In 2011, he premiered the 150th work of his professional career, Festival Dance at his dance center in Brooklyn.

Morris and his Dance Group collaborated with cellist Yo-Yo Ma in Falling Down Stairs, a film by Barbara Willis Sweete available on volume 2 of Ma's Emmy-winning Inspired by Bach series. There, Morris choreographed a dance based on Bach's Third Suite for Unaccompanied Cello, which Ma performs. Sweete's film depicts the performance as well as the evolution of the dance. Morris has also collaborated with visual artists such as Isaac Mizrahi, Howard Hodgkin, Charles Burns and Stephen Hendee.

Morris was the director and choreographer of the 1998 Broadway musical The Capeman, which featured music by Paul Simon and book and lyrics by Simon and Derek Walcott.

In 2001 his company moved into its first permanent headquarters in the United States, the Mark Morris Dance Center, in Brooklyn, at 3 Lafayette Avenue in the Fort Greene neighborhood. 2001 also marked the establishment of the School at the Mark Morris Dance Center. In addition the Mark Morris Dance Group, the center houses rehearsal space for the dance community, outreach programs for local children and persons with Parkinson's disease, and a school offering dance classes to students of all ages.

Morris is the subject of a biography, Mark Morris (1993), by dance critic Joan Acocella. In 2001, he published L'Allegro, il Penseroso ed il Moderato: A Celebration, a volume of photographs and critical essays.

In 2013, Morris was the first choreographer and dancer to be the music director of the Ojai Music Festival.

In 2017, Morris premiered Pepperland, a commissioned production based on the music of The Beatles at Royal Court Liverpool marking the 50th anniversary of the release of Sgt. Pepper's Lonely Hearts Club Band.

In 2019, Morris published Out Loud: A Memoir, written with Wesley Stace.

In 2022, Morris premiered The Look of Love, a production based on the music of Burt Bacharach.

== Honors and awards ==
- 11 honorary doctorates (Cornish School of the Arts, 2011; Roehampton University, 2010; Centenary College, 2009; Bard College, 2006; Bates College, 2006; George Mason University, 2005; Bowdoin College, 2003; Pratt Institute, 2003; Long Island University, 2002; Juilliard School, 2001; Boston Conservatory of Music, 1994)
- Leonard Bernstein Lifetime Achievement Award for the Elevation of Music in Society, 2010
- American Philosophical Society, Member, 2008
- The Independent Award, Brown University Club of New York, 2007
- Samuel H. Scripps American Dance Festival Lifetime Achievement Award, 2007
- WQXR Gramophone Special Recognition Award, 2006
- New York City Mayor's Award for Arts & Culture, 2006
- American Academy of Arts & Sciences, Fellow, 2005
- Laurence Olivier Award (UK), Outstanding Achievement in Dance, 2002
- Critics' Circle National Dance Award (UK), Best Modern Choreography, 2002
- Critics' Circle National Dance Award (UK), Best Foreign Dance Company, 2002
- Time Out Live Awards (UK), Outstanding Production (V), 2002
- County of Los Angeles Distinguished Artist Award, 2001
- New York State Governor's Arts Award, 2001
- Best of Boston, Mark Morris & Yo-Yo Ma, Best Duet, 1999
- Laurence Olivier Award (UK), Best New Dance Production (L'Allegro, il Penseroso ed il Moderato), 1998
- Evening Standard Award (UK), 1997
- Capezio Achievement Award, 1997
- Scotsman/Hamada Trust Festival Prize, Edinburgh Festival, 1995
- Edinburgh International Critics Award, 1994
- Edinburgh International Critics Award, 1992
- John D. and Catherine T. MacArthur Fellowship, 1991
- Dance Magazine Award, 1991
- John Simon Guggenheim Memorial Foundation Fellowship, 1986
- New York Dance and Performance Award ("Bessie"), 1984, 1990, 2007
- Numerous honors include Choreographic Fellowships from the New York and New Jersey State Councils on the Arts and the National Endowment for the Arts.

== Ballets ==
Morris has created eight works for the San Francisco Ballet since 1994, including the first American production of Delibes's Sylvia; three works for American Ballet Theatre including Gong with music by Colin McPhee and Drink to Me Only With Thine Eyes with music by Virgil Thomson; and has also received commissions from the Joffrey Ballet and the Boston Ballet, among others. In 2009, the San Francisco Ballet toasted 15 years of collaborations with Morris by presenting the first all-Morris program, performing A Garden (2001), Joyride (2008) and Sandpaper Ballet (1999). His work is in the repertory of Ballet British Columbia, Ballet West, Boston Ballet, Dutch National Ballet, Houston Ballet, Pacific Northwest Ballet and the Washington Ballet. Morris's ballets have also been performed by English National Ballet, Grand Théâtre de Genève, the Royal Ballet, and the Royal New Zealand Ballet.

=== Ballet commissions ===
- Mort Subite—Boston Ballet (1986)
- Esteemed Guests—Joffrey Ballet (1986)
- Drink to Me Only With Thine Eyes—American Ballet Theatre (1988)
- Ein Herz—Paris Opera Ballet (1990)
- Paukenschlag—Les Grands Ballets Canadiens (1992)
- Maelstrom—San Francisco Ballet (1994)
- Quincunx—Les Grands Ballets Canadiens (1995)
- Pacific—San Francisco Ballet (1995)
- Sandpaper Ballet—San Francisco Ballet (1999)
- A Garden—San Francisco Ballet (2001)
- Gong—American Ballet Theatre (2001)
- Later—San Francisco Ballet (2002)
- Non Troppo—American Ballet Theatre (2003)
- Sylvia—San Francisco Ballet (2004)
- Up and Down—Boston Ballet (2006)
- Joyride—San Francisco Ballet (2008)
- Beaux—San Francisco Ballet (2012)
- Kammermusik No. 3—Pacific Northwest Ballet (2012)
- Whelm—Brooklyn Academy of Music (2015)
- The Letter V—Houston Ballet (2015)
- After You—American Ballet Theatre (2015)

== Operas ==
Morris has worked extensively in opera for over 20 years, directing and choreographing productions for the Metropolitan Opera, New York City Opera, English National Opera, Seattle Opera, and the Royal Opera, Covent Garden, among others. In 2009, in honor of the bicentennial of Joseph Haydn's death, Gotham Chamber Opera presented the New York City stage premiere of Haydn's L'isola disabitata (Desert Island) in a new production by Morris at the Gerald W. Lynch Theater at John Jay College., rev.

=== Directed and/or choreographed ===
- Salome—Choreographer (Seattle Opera, 1986)
- Nixon in China—Choreographer (Houston Grand Opera, 1987)
- Orphée et Euridice—Choreographer (Seattle Opera, 1988)
- Die Fledermaus—Director (Seattle Opera, 1988)
- Le nozze di Figaro (Act III wedding scene)—Choreographer (PepsiCo Summerfare, 1988)
- Dido and Aeneas—Director and Choreographer (La Monnaie, 1989)
- The Death of Klinghoffer—Choreographer (La Monnaie, 1991)
- Le nozze di Figaro—Director (La Monnaie, 1991)
- Orfeo ed Euridice—Director and Choreographer (Handel & Haydn Society, 1996)
- Platée—Director and Choreographer (Royal Opera, 1997)
- Four Saints in Three Acts—Director and Choreographer (English National Opera, 2000)
- Idomeneo (Act III ballet)—Choreographer (Glyndebourne Festival Opera, 2003)
- King Arthur—Director and Choreographer (English National Opera, 2006)
- Orfeo ed Euridice—Director and Choreographer (Metropolitan Opera, 2007)
- L'isola d'isabitata—Director (Gotham Chamber Opera, 2009)

In 2011, the Metropolitan Opera revived its 2007 production of Orfeo ed Euridice, directed by Morris, and the Met premiere of John Adams's Nixon in China, choreographed by Morris in 1987. The latter was filmed and broadcast as part of the Met's Live in HD series in a recreation of Peter Sellars's production created for its 1987 world premiere in Houston, which had previously been performed at the Brooklyn Academy of Music, the Kennedy Center, and by the Los Angeles Opera.

== Conductor ==
In 2006, for the opening of MMDG's 25th anniversary New York season, the company performed Morris's Gloria (1981, rev. 1984) set to Vivaldi's Gloria in D, RV 589. Morris took up the baton for the first time to conduct the MMDG Music Ensemble and the Juilliard Choral Union. In 2007, he began conducting performances of his opera Dido and Aeneas (1989). He has also led Emmanuel Music, the Seattle Symphony and the Tudor Choir in performance. In 2011, he led the Brooklyn Philharmonic and Brooklyn Interdenominational Choir in a collaboration with MMDG at the Prospect Park Bandshell, part of a Mark Morris Dance Group program presented by Celebrate Brooklyn! Also in 2011, he conducted Dido again with MMDG, this time with the Philharmonia Baroque Orchestra and Chorale; mezzo Stephanie Blythe, singing both Dido and the Sorceress; and baritone Philip Cutlip as Aeneas.

== Personal life ==
Morris lives in the Kips Bay neighborhood of Manhattan. He is gay.
