= Mark Morris Dance Center =

Venue in Brooklyn, New York, United States

Coordinates: 40°41′13.17″N 73°58′43.84″W

Mark Morris Dance Center (2026)

The Mark Morris Dance Center is the permanent home of the international touring modern dance company, the Mark Morris Dance Group (MMDG), in the Fort Greene neighborhood of Brooklyn, New York City. It is located at the address 3 Lafayette Avenue on the corner of Flatbush Avenue. Open since 2001, the center also houses rehearsal space for the dance community, outreach programs for local children and area residents, and a school offering dance classes to students of all ages.

In 1996, the Mark Morris Dance Group launched a $7.4 million capital campaign to build what would be its first permanent headquarters in the United States. The company purchased a derelict building on the corner of Flatbush and Lafayette Avenues in Fort Greene, Brooklyn, and broke ground in 1999. The architectural firm Beyer Blinder Belle designed the building, which consists of 5 stories, seven column-free studios with wood-sprung floors, locker rooms with showers, a wellness center, a 140-seat performance space, and offices for the company's administrative staff. Seven studios are available to rent at discounted rates to non-profit dance companies, and range in size from 430 square feet (40 m^{2}) to 3,600 square feet (330 m^{2}).

== Construction ==
Inspiration for the center was derived from the company's time in Belgium, from 1988 to 1991, where it was the resident company at the Théâtre de La Monnaie in Brussels. Here, Morris created some of his largest works including L’Allegro, il Penseroso ed il Moderato, and The Hard Nut.

In 1998, the Mark Morris Dance Group purchased a derelict building on the corner of Flatbush and Lafayette Avenues in Fort Greene, Brooklyn, located just one block west from the Brooklyn Academy of Music. The goal was not only to house the company, but also to build a public facility for dance. A $7.4 million capital campaign was launched to build the center, and donations were received from both public and private sources. The architectural firm Beyer Blinder Belle Architects and Planners, led by architect Fred Bland, designed the building. The dancer's dressing rooms, Morris’ personal office, and the staff's offices were placed together on the same floor to maintain a sense of unity and family. Construction broke ground in 1999, and the center was completed in September 2001. The staff moved in during March 2001, and dancers began rehearsals in July. When first built, the dance center occupied the top three floors of the building – more than 18, 0 square feet (0 m^{2}) of space. It consisted of three column-free dance studios with wood-sprung floors, full-length mirrors, and sound systems. The main studio on the top floor, known as the largest unobstructed dance studio in New York City, measured 3,600 square-feet (60’ by 60’) and was envisioned to be equipped one day with theatrical lighting and retractable seating to accommodate everything from casual showings to formal concerts.

Expansion of the Mark Morris Dance Center is separated into phases, from the formal outfitting of the main studio on the 5th floor, now named the James & Martha Duffy Performance Space, in 2004 to the addition of the first two floors to the layout of the dance center in 2005 and 2008.

In 2004, the James & Martha Duffy Performance Space was fully outfitted to include a 140-seat theater. The fully equipped theater often holds public performances of Morris’ work, and is also rented by non-profit organizations at a subsidized rate. The venue consists of 28’ by 40’ danceable space with wings and crossover, and a velour house curtain. The premiere public performances at the Duffy Performance Space were given by the Mark Morris Dance Group in January 2007. Other major performances that have happened in this space include:

- The inaugural performance by the Mark Morris Dance Group given for the Association of Performing Arts Presenters (APAP) conference in 2005.
- On January 11, 2006, a Gala performance in conjunction with the 25th anniversary of the Mark Morris Dance Group was given to a private group of donors. The one-night-only show included a performance of Morris’ The Argument danced by its original cast members (including Mark Morris, Mikhail Baryshnikov and founding company member Tina Fehlandt, among others) and accompanied by cellist Yo-Yo Ma.
- As part of the Month of Mark during the 25th anniversary season, co-presented by the Brooklyn Academy of Music, three Solos, Duets & Trios programs were presented in March 2006.
- In January 2007, nine sold-out performances were held by the Mark Morris Dance Group. The program included the world premiere of Morris’ Italian Concerto.

A two-phase expansion (known as Phase 3 and Phase 4) consisted of outfitting the remaining parts of building. Studios A and B opened on the first floor in September 2006. Studios C and D, as well as a mezzanine-level Wellness Center, were completed in 2009.

Today, the Mark Morris Dance Center consists of the entire 5-story structure, has seven column-free studios with wood-sprung floors, lockers and showers, a wellness center, a performance space and expanded public space, and offices on the third floor. The studios range in size from 430 to 3,600 square feet (40 to 334 m^{2}).

== Structures ==
The newest space at the dance center, located on the mezzanine level, is equipped with Pilates and exercise equipment and therapy suites. Therapists are available to the company and to private clients from the community.

On Monday through Saturday at the Dance Center, studios are filled with rehearsals and classes for children, teens, and adults. Children's classes, which according to the New York Times, are highly affordable include creative dance, modern, ballet, jazz/hip hop, tap, and music and singing. Adult classes range from yoga, ballet and modern, to tap and West African dance. In addition, the center offers pre-professional summer intensives, children's and teen summer workshops and parent-toddler movement classes.

== Outreach ==
- The Mark Morris Dance, Music and Literacy Project is a ten-week in-school program that introduces Brooklyn's public and private school students to Mark Morris' L'Allegro, il Penseroso ed il Moderato. Working with MMDG teaching artists, students are introduced to Milton's poems, Handel's music, Blake's illustrations, and Morris's choreography. Students themselves learn sections of the piece and visit the studio for a private performance with the Dance Group. It is offered every fall and spring semester at no cost to the schools.
- Dance for Parkinson's is a program which partners the Mark Morris Dance Group with the Brooklyn Parkinson's Group to offer dance workshops for people with Parkinson's disease, and their caregivers. The free weekly workshops are led by MMDG dancers, teaching artists, and musicians who draw on many forms of dance and teach some mental strategies that dancers use to learn movements. The program was started in 2001 at the Dance Center by Olie Westheimer and has led to replication classes around the world.
- The Subsidized Studio Rental Program is a service to the community where MMDG rents out over 5,000 hours per year to nonprofit dance companies and solo-artists at a deeply reduced rate. This has been a major part of the Mark Morris Dance Group programming since the center opened in 2001, and over 800 distinct companies and choreographers have made use of the studios since the program began.
- MMDG has partnered with the New York City Housing Authority to provide free weekly dance classes led by MMDG teaching artists to children living in Brooklyn public housing. The program has expanded to include dance classes led by MMDG company members for seniors as well.
- The MMDG hosts two open house events each year, during which free classes are offered all day and free performances are given by MMDG's Student Company, the MMDG dancers, and the MMDG Music Ensemble in the Dance Center's James and Martha Duffy Performance Space.
