= Patrick McGowan =

Patrick McGowan may refer to:

- Patrick McGowan (Irish politician) (1926–1999), Fianna Fáil politician
- Patrick McGowan (New York politician) (1842–1893), Irish-American politician
- Patrick D. McGowan (born 1951), American politician from Minnesota and law enforcement officer
- Patrick K. McGowan, American politician from Maine
- Pat McGowan (born 1954), American golfer
- Pat McGowan (footballer) (born 1959), Scottish footballer

== See also ==
- Paddy McGowan, politician in Northern Ireland
