= Prison Ship Martyrs' Monument =

Monument in Brooklyn, New York, U.S.

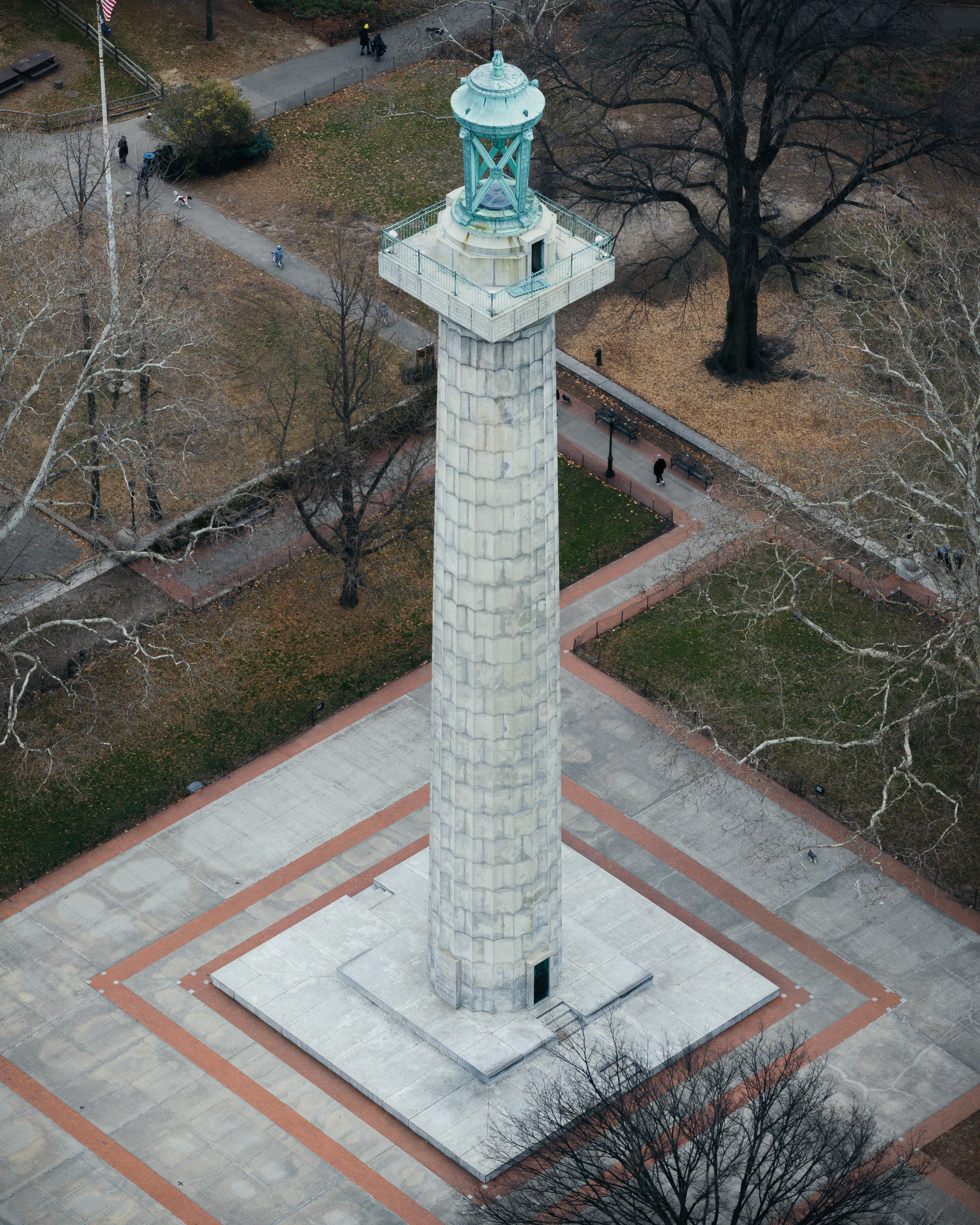
- The monument in January 2024
- Interactive map of Prison Ship Martyrs' Monument
- 40.6918°N 73.9756°W
- Location: Fort Greene Park; Brooklyn, New York, US

History
- Dedicated: November 14, 1908; 118 years ago

Site notes
- Height: 149 feet (45 meters)
- Architect: Stanford White
- Sculptor: Adolf Weinman
- Restored: 1974, 2008
- Governing body: New York City Department of Parks and Recreation

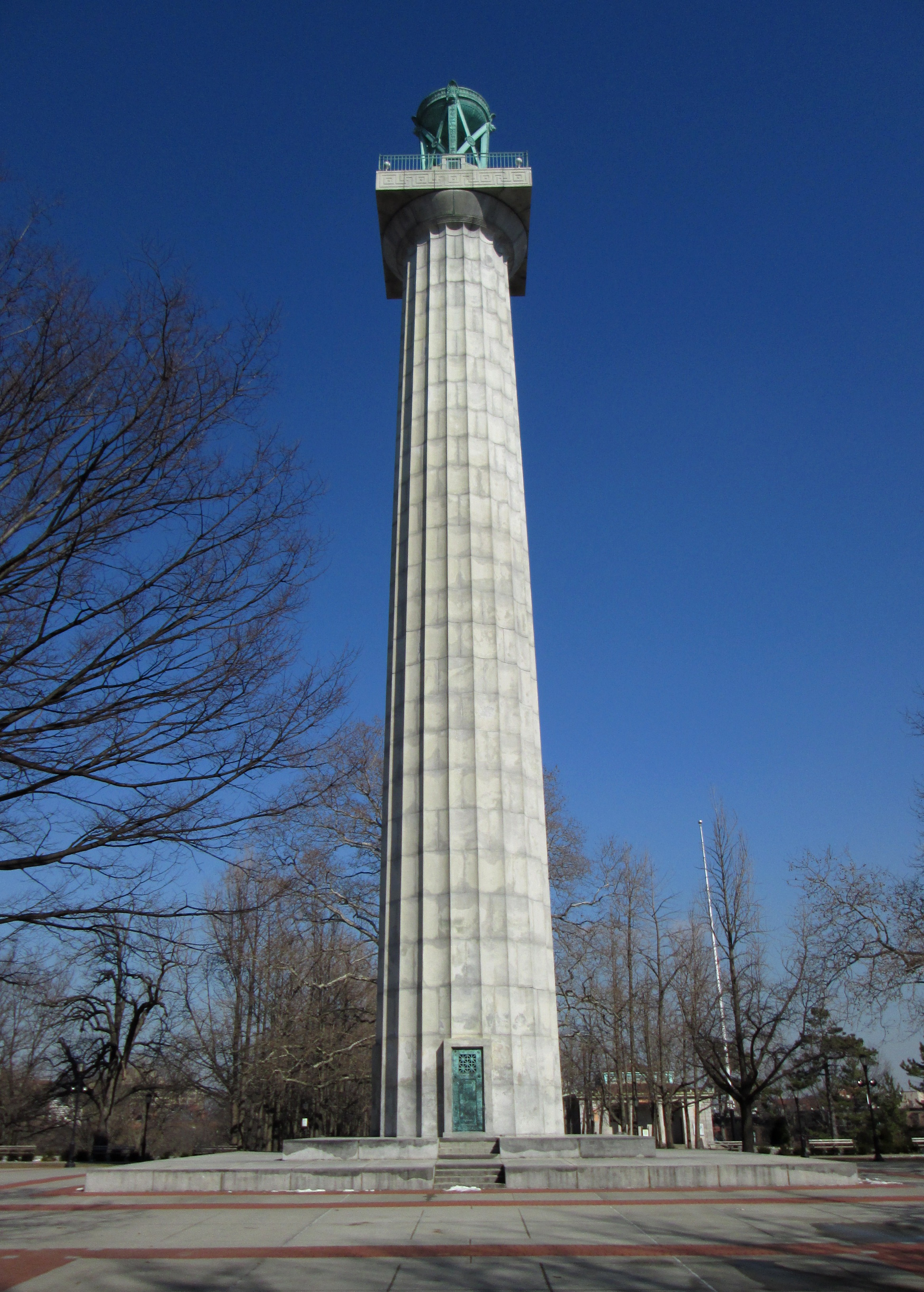
Prison Ship Martyrs' Monument (2013)

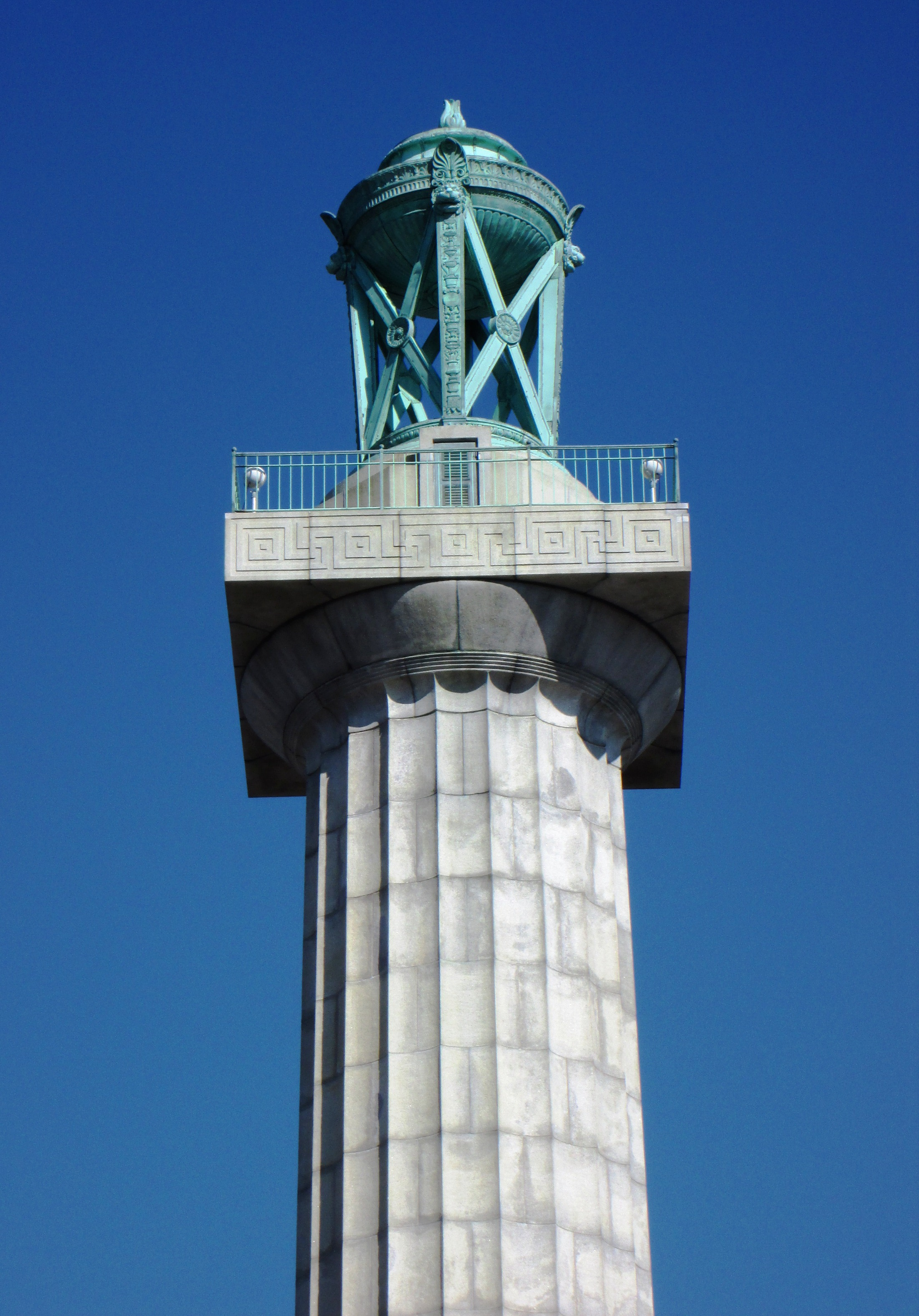
Adolf Weinman's brazier at the top

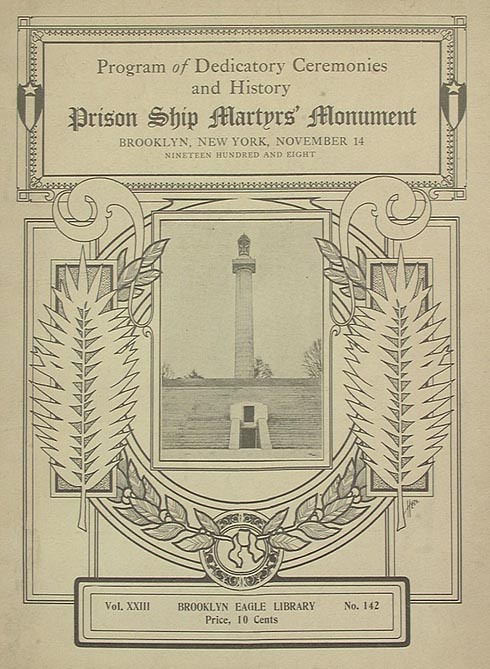
Program for the dedication ceremonies, November 14, 1908

The Prison Ship Martyrs' Monument is a war memorial at Fort Greene Park, in the New York City borough of Brooklyn. It commemorates more than 11,500 American prisoners of war who died in captivity aboard sixteen British prison ships during the American Revolutionary War. The remains of a small fraction of those who died on the ships are interred in a crypt beneath its base. The sixteen ships included HMS Jersey, HMS Scorpion, Good Hope, Falmouth, Stromboli and Hunter.

Their remains were first gathered and interred in 1808. In 1867 landscape architects Frederick Law Olmsted and Calvert Vaux, designers of Central Park and Prospect Park, were engaged to prepare a new design for Washington Park as well as a new crypt for the remains of the prison ship martyrs. In 1873, after development near the Brooklyn Navy Yard uncovered the remains, they were moved and re-interred in a crypt beneath a small monument. Funds were raised for a larger monument, which was designed by noted architect Stanford White. Constructed of granite, its single Doric column 149 feet (45 m) in height sits over the crypt at the top of a 100-foot-wide (30 m) 33-step staircase. At the top of the column is an eight-ton bronze brazier, a funeral urn, by sculptor Adolph Weinman. President-elect William Howard Taft delivered the principal address when the monument was dedicated in 1908.

== Context ==
Secretary's Report of the Obsequies of the Prison Ship Martyrs at Plymouth Church, Brooklyn, New York on June 16, 1900

=== Remains of deceased prisoners ===
During the Revolutionary War, the British maintained a series of prison ships in New York Harbor and jails on shore for prisoners of war. Due to a combination of neglect, poor conditions on the ships and disease, thousands of American prisoners of war died onboard the prison ships and jails, more than in all the engagements of the American Revolutionary War combined. Prisoners of war who died were disposed of either by a quick interment on the shore or being thrown overboard. Following the end of the war in 1783, the remains of those who died on the prison ships were neglected, left to lie along the Brooklyn shore on Wallabout Bay, a rural area little visited by New Yorkers. On January 21, 1877, the New York Times reported that the dead came from all parts of the nation and "every state of the Union was represented among them."

Officials of the local Dutch Reformed Church met with resistance from the property owner when they sought to remove the bones to their churchyard. Nathaniel Scudder Prime reported on "skulls and feet, arms and legs sticking out of the crumbling bank in the wildest disorder". Edwin G. Burrows described the skulls on the coast "as thick as pumpkins in an autumn cornfield". During construction at the Naval Yards, workers were not sure what to do with the bones, and they started to fill casks and boxes. They were reburied on the grounds of the nearby John Jackson estate.

Eventually, "near twenty hogsheads full of bones were collected by the indefatigable industry of John Jackson, esq. the committee of Tammany Society, and other citizens, to be interred in the vault." The monument's dedication plaque estimates that 11,500 prisoners of war died in the prison ships, but others estimate the number to be as high as 18,000.

=== Political resolve ===
The movement to commemorate the dead only took off when political differences between Federalists and Democratic-Republicans deepened in the last years of the eighteenth century and the latter took up the question of a memorial in response to the Federalist erection of a statue of George Washington in 1803. The Tammany Society, headed by Benjamin Romaine was created and grew into a Republican organization. On February 10, 1803 Republican Congressman Samuel L. Mitchill asked the federal government to erect a monument to the fallen, but had no success They then turned their efforts to a grand ceremonial re-interment of the prisoners' remains, emphasizing less the construction of a monument than something more suited to the common man. Tammany formed the Wallabout Committee in January 1808. Their efforts took strength from renewed anti-British sentiment stemming from American disputes with Britain in 1806 and 1807. Finally, when President Thomas Jefferson enacted the Embargo Act of 1808, Tammany and the Republicans used their plans for a re-interment as part of their campaign to bolster anti-British sentiment in the United States.

== Precursor vaults and monuments ==
=== First vault and monument ===
On April 13, 1808, there was a ceremony to lay the cornerstone of a planned vault. A grand ceremony of re-interment followed on May 26, 1808. The state voted to provide the Tammany Society $1,000 to build a monument. The Society pocketed the money and the monument was never built. A small square building stood above the 1808 vault with an eagle mounted at the point of the roof. It was located on a triangular plot of land near the Brooklyn Navy Yard waterfront (Wallabout Bay) in what is now called Vinegar Hill. A wooden fence with thirteen posts and bars painted with the names of the original thirteen states was erected in front. At the entrance through the fence, an inscription said: "Portal to the tomb of 11,500 patriot prisoners, who died in dungeons and prison-ships, in and about the City of New-York, during the Revolution." The remains were put in long coffins made of bluestone. Extra space was provided in case more bones were discovered during continuing renovations in the Brooklyn Navy Yard. Little was done to repair or maintain the vault and eventually the original monument was in a state of disrepair and neglect. In 1839, Benjamin Romaine purchased the land where the Martyrs were buried, in a tax sale from Henry Reed Stiles for $291.08. Later that year on July 4, 1839, Benjamin Romaine made an appeal for support (governmental or civic) to build a monument. In this appeal, Romaine talked about the monument and his intention to use his Revolutionary War pension for the monument. On January 31, 1844, Benjamin Romaine died and was also interred in the crypt as he had been a prisoner of war on the ships.

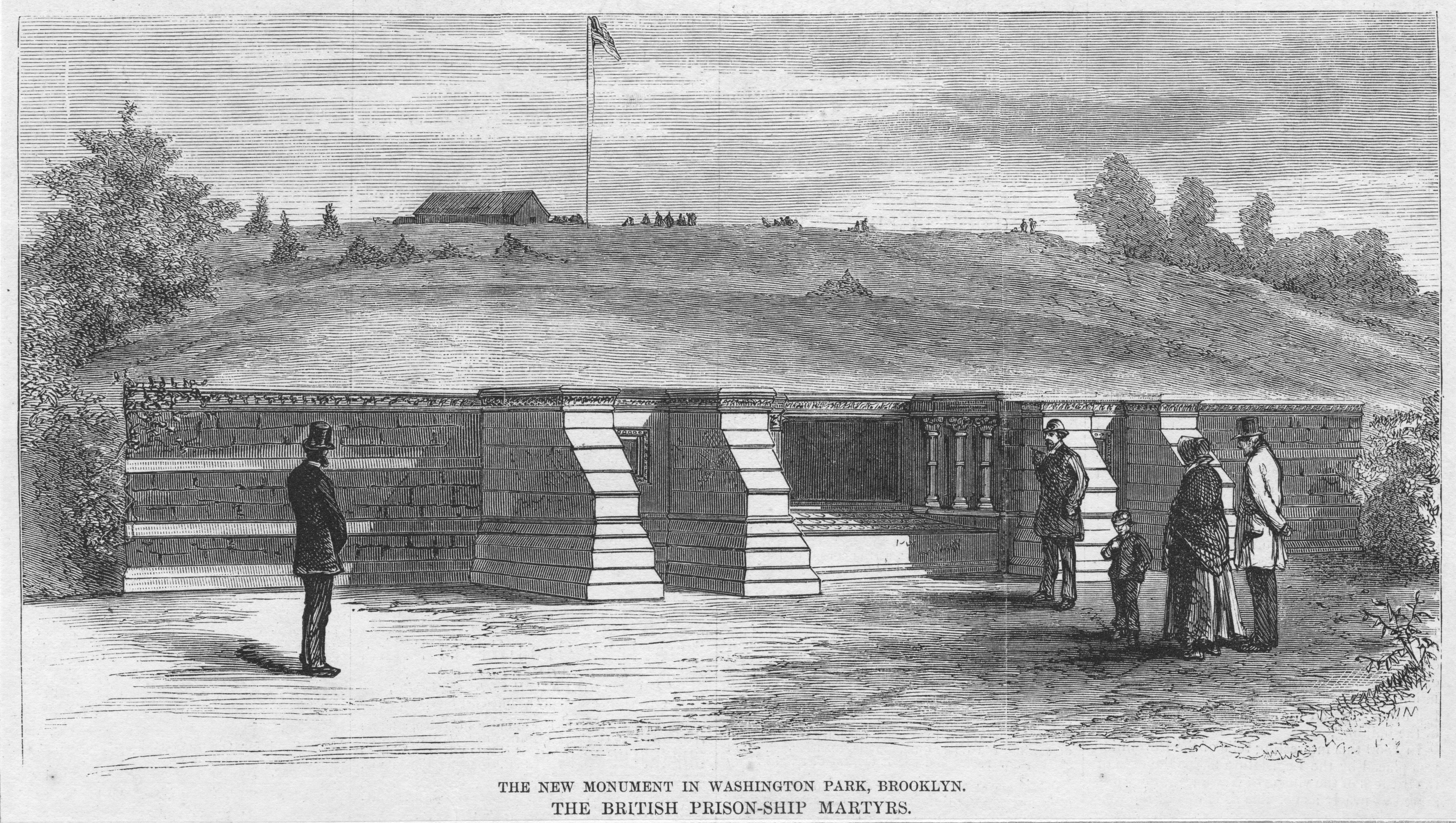
The new monument in Washington Park, Brooklyn

=== Second vault and monument ===
Later in the nineteenth century, the idea of erecting of a monument on the vault site attracted only occasional interest until 1873 when an appropriation of $6,500 was established for a new mausoleum. The new 25-by-11-foot (7.6 by 3.4 m) brick mausoleum in Fort Greene Park, then known as Washington Park, was constructed. The new mausoleum was constructed of Portland granite embellished with pillars and fret work of polished Aberdeen stone. The front of the tomb had the following inscription: "SACRED TO THE MEMORY, OF OUR SAILORS, SOLDIERS AND CITIZENS, WHO SUFFERED AND DIED ON BOARD BRITISH PRISON SHIPS IN THE WALLABOUT DURING THE AMERICAN REVOLUTION". On June 18, 1873, the first tomb was emptied of bones and they were moved to this tomb. The bones remained here until interest was again built and a new monument could be constructed.

== Current monument ==
=== Planning and construction ===
The Fort Greene chapter of the DAR was founded by Eliza M. Chandler White and formed in 1896 in Brooklyn to foster the construction of a "suitable memorial to the memory of martyrs, civilian, military and naval, who perished in the noisome prison ships anchored in the Wallabout Bay during the Revolutionary War". The group quickly partnered with the Old Brooklynites to increase focus on the memorial.

Following the discovery of additional bones in the Brooklyn Naval Yard in 1899, interest in establishing a significant monument was again renewed. On June 16, 1900, the bones found during additional excavations in the Brooklyn Navy Yard were interred in the crypt with full military honors. The boxes were reported to be oak, five feet (1.5 m) long and two feet (0.61 m) wide. On June 19, 1900, the Brooklyn Eagle reported that a committee had been appointed to build a larger memorial to replace the current one. Due to the work of this committee, funds for a new monument were finally considered and raised.

Funding for a larger monument came from all levels of government. On June 28, 1902, a joint resolution of the House and Senate appropriated $100,000 for the memorial construction under the provision that an additional $100,000 be raised from other sources. In the following months, New York State provided $25,000, and New York City $50,000, while private contributions provided another $25,000. Following funds being established, the Prison Ship Martyrs Association was incorporated in Albany on May 9, 1903 to oversee the work and the renowned architect Stanford White (1853–1906) of the architectural firm of McKim, Mead & White was commissioned to design it. The contract for construction of the monument was awarded to Carlin Construction Company under the project supervision of Lieut. Col. W. L. Marshall. In 1776, Fort Greene Park was the site of Fort Putnam, one of a series of defenses built on the high land in Brooklyn. The construction was supervised by Colonel Rufus Putnam and the purpose was to protect New York from the British.

=== Dedication ===
The dedication ceremony on November 14, 1908, included a parade with 15,000 participants, including military and National Guard units, veterans, and civic organizations, including representatives of Tammany Hall Society in their first parade since the Civil War. President-elect William Howard Taft, Secretary of War Luke E. Wright, New York Governor Charles Evans Hughes, New Jersey Governor Franklin Fort, and Delaware Governor Preston Lea watched along with approximately twenty thousand spectators as "the enormous flag draping the Prison Ship Martyrs' Monument on the highest point of Fort Greene Park, Brooklyn, was allowed to slide slowly to the ground from its heighth [sic] of 198 feet in the air". The ceremony was opened with a prayer delivered by Rev. S. Parkes Cadman, followed by a poem composed and read by the occasion's poet laureate Thomas Walsh. The principal address was delivered by Taft. He set out in detail the treatment of American prisoners and of the dead he said: "They died because of the cruelty of their immediate custodians and the neglect of those who, in higher authority, were responsible for their detention." He carefully described British culpability:

I do not wish to be understood as charging that these conditions were due to the premeditations of the English commanders in chief or to the set purposes of anyone in authority having to do with the fate of the unfortunate men whose bravery and self-sacrifice this monument records. Such a charge would make the British commanders human monsters. The conditions were the result of neglect, not design.

He discussed the treatment of prisoners of war throughout history and praised the recent Hague Convention on the rights of prisoners of war and the recent Sino-Japanese War in which "both parties exceeded, in the tenderness and the care which they gave to the prisoners of the other, the requirements of the Hague Convention".

Following the initial dedication, the Society of Old Brooklynites has hosted an annual memorial for the martyrs every year since President Taft dedicated the monument in 1908.

=== Neglect and restorations ===
==== 20th century ====
In February 1914, one of the eagles was stolen. The thieves sold it as scrap metal for $24. They broke the eagle from the granite base, rolled it down the slope and loaded it on a three-wheeled pushcart, leaving tracks which the police were able to follow. When police found it at a recycling yard, the wings of the eagle had already been removed and partially melted.

By 1921, the twin helix stairways to the top of the monument, which visitors once paid a dime to climb, were closed. Until then, visitors could go to the top to get impressive views of Manhattan. In 1923, the bronze door to the crypt was "battered from its hinges" by vandals and the crypt was exposed. The New York Times report of the incident described how the monument provided a play area for neighborhood children: "[A] score of children, white and black, who live in the neighborhood were using the granite coping of the walls leading to the crypt as a sort of 'chute the chutes.' The color line was sharply drawn. The slope of one side was used by the negro children while the slope of the other side amused the whites. The children of neither hue were concerned with the crime. They realized vaguely that something unusual had taken place, but it was not important enough to them to stop their daily sport." However, neglect and damage to the park required it to be renovated. The memorial had become so scarred by vandals and unkempt from lack of proper maintenance as to present a dilapidated appearance. Work was done to clean and preserve the site. A staircase and elevator were installed inside the large column, and it was reopened in 1937 by Park Commissioner Robert Moses. Again, the park was neglected and restoration work was required. It began in 1948 to "keep the shrine from falling apart". The staircase and elevator, however, were both removed in 1949.

In the ensuing years, however, the park slowly decayed again and, by the 1970s, graffiti covered much of the base of the monument and vandalism was taking its toll. $251,000 was spent to repair the monument in 1974, as part of a larger $780,000 restoration of Fort Greene Park.

In 1995, an examination of the vault reported it held bone fragments in 20 slate boxes, each two by two by seven feet (0.61 by 0.61 by 2.13 m). During the park system's inspection in 1995, graffiti was noted to be on the crypt's interior walls. The graffiti is questionably dated to go back to 1973, 1908, and as one tag was scribbled, 1776 — which is anachronistic considering that this was before the tomb was even built, in 1908.

During a site review on January 7, 2000, Park System workers raised the lid of the stone coffin of Benjamin Romaine. The interior of the coffin appeared to have contained a partially collapsed wooden coffin. By then, the monument was missing plaques, the plaza was potholed, and the crypt had a plywood door.

==== 21st century ====
In December 2003, a dig was done on the original site of the Martyrs' Monument. The site dig was funded by a grant of $2,500 from the J. M. Kaplan Fund. It was supervised by Dr. Joan H. Geismar an archaeological consultant. The original site (block 44, lot 14 Brooklyn) is located on 89 Hudson Ave (formerly Jackson Street: named after an early donor of the property for the Monument in 1808). The goals of the dig were to review if any more human remains could be found on the site and if evidence of the original crypt remained. The site was scheduled for housing development to begin on the site. The Crypt location was specifically identified from an 1855 Perris insurance atlas as well as a mid-19th-century manuscript map found in the National Archives. The work determined that the site at one time contained a deep void, but no foundations were found. They did find a massive stone side wall as well as the likely original post holes for the rail fence. The site development was allowed with a recommendation of a plaque when work was done. The redevelopment of the site was completed and eventually the property changed owners. The status of the plaque is not known and currently there is no plaque on the site.

The city launched the renovation of the Prison Ship Monument with a $3.5 million budget in 2004. The scheduled repairs were plagued by cost overruns and the initial electrical contractor was fired by New York City and needed to be replaced. Additionally, a new spiral staircase was built inside the memorial. A budgetary study was conducted from March 6, 2006 to September 5, 2008 on electrical improvements and the cost estimated to about $341,000.

The restored monument was unveiled on November 15, 2008, a centennial celebration, at a rededication ceremony commissioned by the Fort Greene Park Conservancy to celebrate the centennial and re-dedication of the Fort Greene Park Prison Ship Martyrs' Monument. More than 500 people gathered to take part in the relighting of the flame to mark the 100th anniversary. That night, the column and urn were lit by a spectacular lighting scheme. The overall restoration cost for the monument from 2006 to 2008 was an estimated $5,100,000. However, in November 2009, it was noted that the light was again not working. The parks department worked to restore the lights and noted that although the lights were working correctly, there was a programming issue with the light timer.

In April 2015, a group of anonymous vandals illicitly installed a 100-pound bust of Edward Snowden, the National Security Agency whistle blower, atop one of the four columns at the edge of the memorial. It was removed the same day by Parks Department personnel.

=== The Bronze Eagles ===
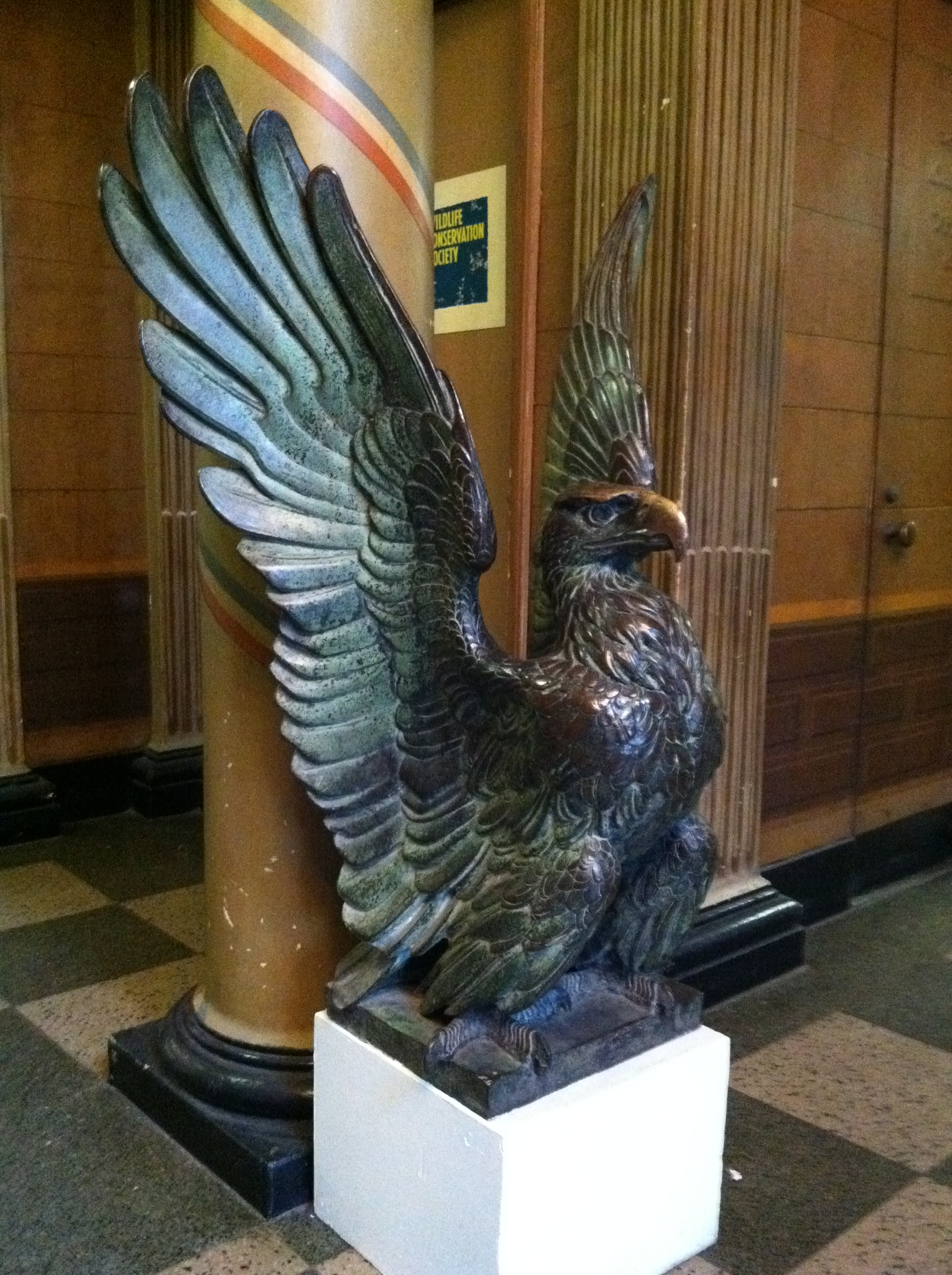
One of Adolph Weinman's original eagles at The Arsenal

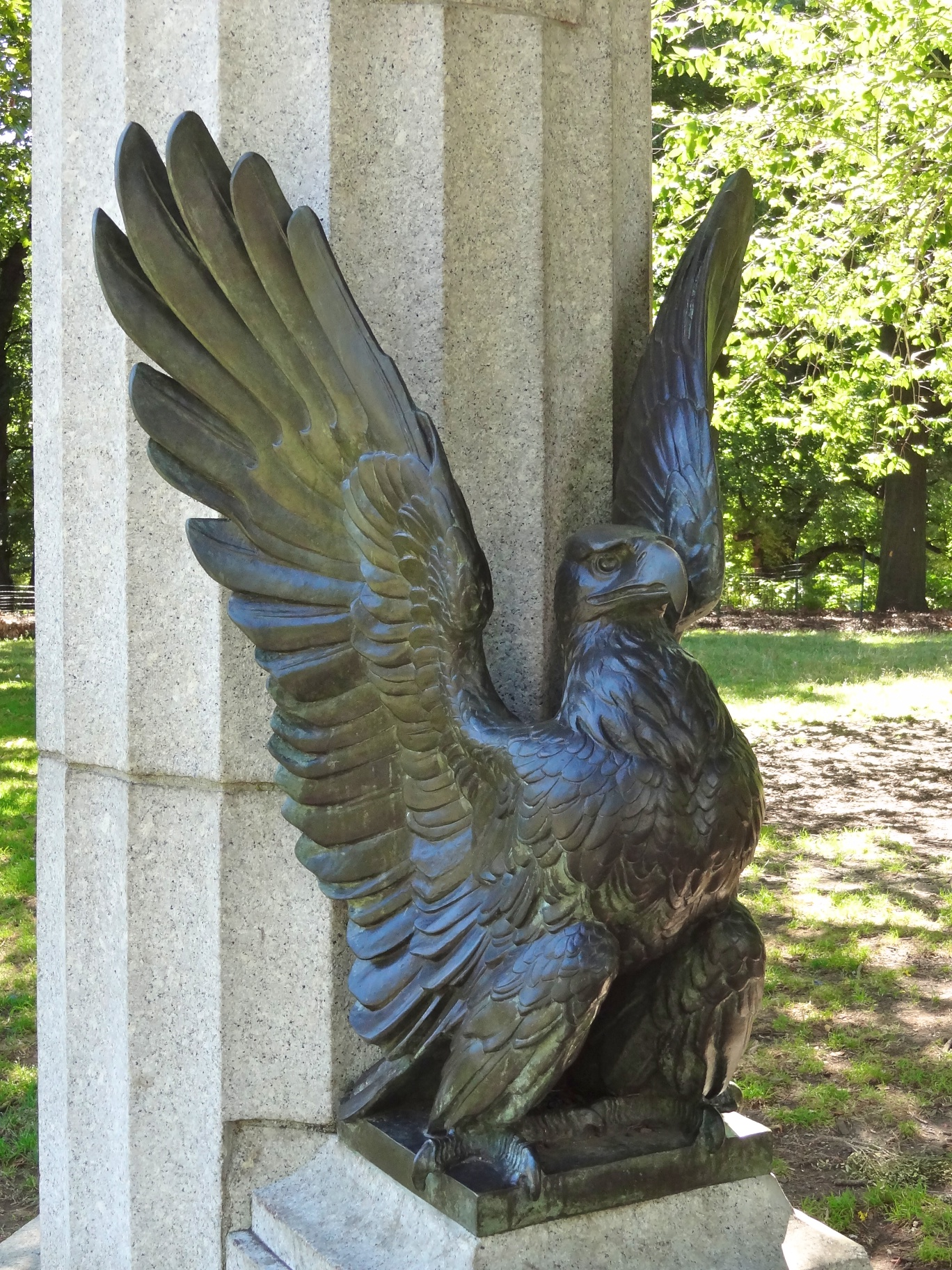
A replica eagle in Fort Greene Park

==== Removal and Storage (1962) ====
By 1962, all four eagles were removed from Fort Greene Park and placed into storage in Manhattan, primarily due to concerns over vandalism.

==== Inquiries and Unfulfilled Promises (1966–1995) ====
In 1966, Roy Vanasco, a local Republican leader, initiated inquiries regarding the location of the eagles. The eagles were tracked to the Central Park Arsenal, the administrative headquarters of the New York City Parks Department, and were specifically located outside the office of the Parks Commissioner. Despite Roy Vanasco's efforts, the eagles remained there. In 1974, Joseph Bresnan, director of the monument division, promised the return of the eagles by late spring of that year, a commitment that was not honored. In 1995, Parks Commissioner Henry Stern also pledged to return the eagles from outside his office, but this promise too was not fulfilled.

==== Renewed Promises and Delays (2000–2003) ====
Amidst controversies in 2000, including accusations against Stern for using the eagles as hat stands (which he denied), another promise to return the eagles was made but not realized. In 2003, a plan was proposed to return three of the original eagles, along with a replica, to the park. This plan, however, faced delays due to the need for various approvals.

==== Partial Resolution (2005–2008) ====
As of 2005, none of the eagles had been reinstated at the park, despite the agreement made in 2003. It was not until 2008 that two original eagles and two replicas were finally returned to Fort Greene Park. However, two original eagles remained at the Brooklyn Arsenal, contrary to the promises made for their return.

==== Present Status ====
Two of the original bronze eagles have been reinstated at the Prison Ship Martyrs' Monument in Fort Greene Park, accompanied by two replicas. The remaining two original eagles continue to be housed at the Central Park Arsenal.

== Description ==
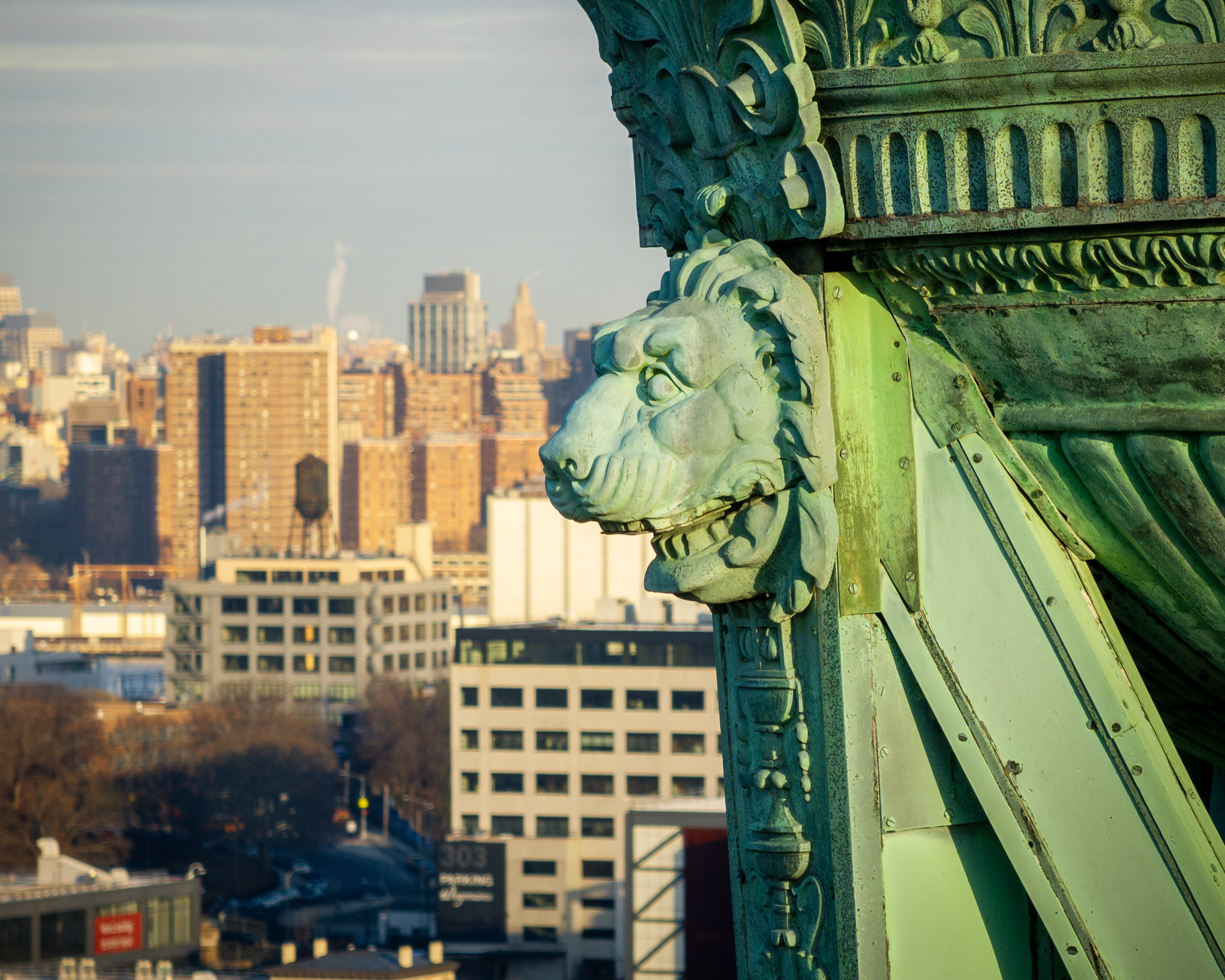
One of the four mascarons on the brazier

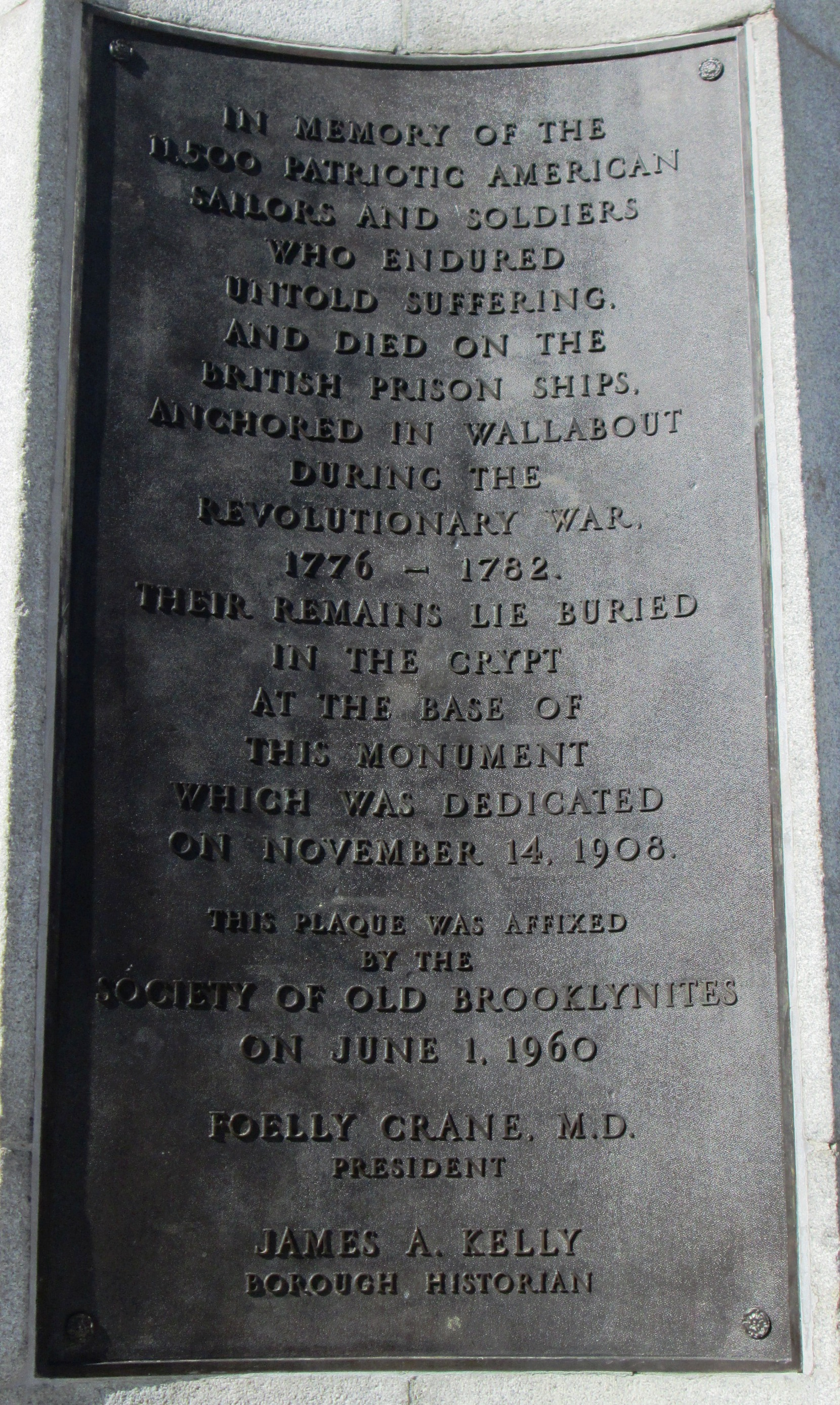
The plaque at the base of the monument

Constructed of granite, the monument's single Doric column 149 feet (45 m) in height sits over the crypt at the top of a 100-foot-wide (30 m) staircase with 99 steps. When it was built, it was the world's tallest Doric column. The column carries the inscription: "1776 THE PRISON SHIP MARTYRS MONUMENT 1908". The monument's column contained a staircase accessed by a bronze door. The stone for the monument came from Lacasse quarry, about four miles (6.4 km) east of Newport, Vermont. The grand staircase of 100 80-foot-wide (24 m) granite steps rises in three stages. At the foot of the staircase, the entrance to the vault was covered by a slab of brown sandstone, now in storage, that bears the names of the 1808 monument committee and builders, as well as this inscription:

In the name of the spirits of
the departed free
sacred to the memory of that por-
tion of American seamen, soldiers &
citizens who perished in the cause of
liberty & their country on board the
prison ships of the British (during the
Revolutionary War) at the Wall-about.
This is the corner stone of the vault
which contains their relics. Erected by
the Tammany Society or Columbian
Order of the City of New York. The ground
for which was bestowed by John Jackson
Nassau Island, season of blossoms
year of discovery, the 316th
of the institution the 19th and of
American Independence the 32nd
April the 6th, 1808.

At the top of the column are uprights two feet (0.61 m) in diameter which are the shape of lion's heads. Each head weighs more than 100 pounds (45 kg). These hold up the urn. At the top of the column is an eight-ton bronze brazier or a funeral urn. The urn, which is 22.5 feet (6.9 m) tall and weighs 7.5 tons, was cast by the Whale Creek Iron Works in Greepoint from designs of Manhattan sculptor Adolph Alexander Weinman. In 1997, a solar-powered eternal beacon was turned on as part of a ceremony.

Four three-foot-high (0.91 m) open-winged 300-pound (140 kg) eagles stood at the corners of the 200-foot (61 m) square terrace at the column's base, each on its own two-foot (0.61 m) pedestal in front of a seven-foot (2.1 m) Doric column. They were designed by Adolf Weinman, who also designed the six-ton brazier that sits upon the monument's principal column.

The crypt is in a vault at the base of the stairs. Inside the vault the floor is made of concrete and the walls and ceiling are a bisque-colored brick. One enters the crypt through a copper-clad door. When entering it is three steps down and then a short passageway into the hill and at the end of the passage is the brick-lined crypt. The crypt is approximately 15 to 20 feet (4.6 to 6.1 m) square. There are a series of slate coffins inserted into a double-set of shelves on the right and left. Various bones are said to be sorted by type into different coffins, presumably because individual bodies could not be identified and re-assembled for burial.

=== Additions ===
A plaque was added in 1960 located across from the front label on the monument. The plaque reads:

In memory of the 11,500 patriotic American sailors and soldiers who endured untold suffering and died on the British prison ships anchored in Wallabout during the Revolutionary War, 1776 – 1782. Their remains lie buried in the crypt at the base of this monument which was dedicated on November 14, 1908. This plaque was affixed by The Society of Old Brooklynites on June 1, 1960. Foelly Crane, M.D. President.

During the Bicentennial Year – 1976, King Juan Carlos of Spain dedicated a plaque honoring the 700 Spaniards who died on the prison ships.

Currently surrounding the monument are secured exhibits explaining the history of the prison ships, the Battle of Brooklyn and a list of the 8,000 known martyrs. It is not documented when these exhibits were added.

Near the monument, a small building designed to coordinate with the work of McKim, Mead, and White once provided restroom facilities but was re-purposed as a visitors' center for the park. The visitors center has pictorial exhibits plus displays of Revolutionary War weapons and uniform buttons that have been uncovered in the park over the years. It also houses a list of the 8,000 known prisoners on the ships copied from the records in the British War Department.

== Maintenance and responsibility ==
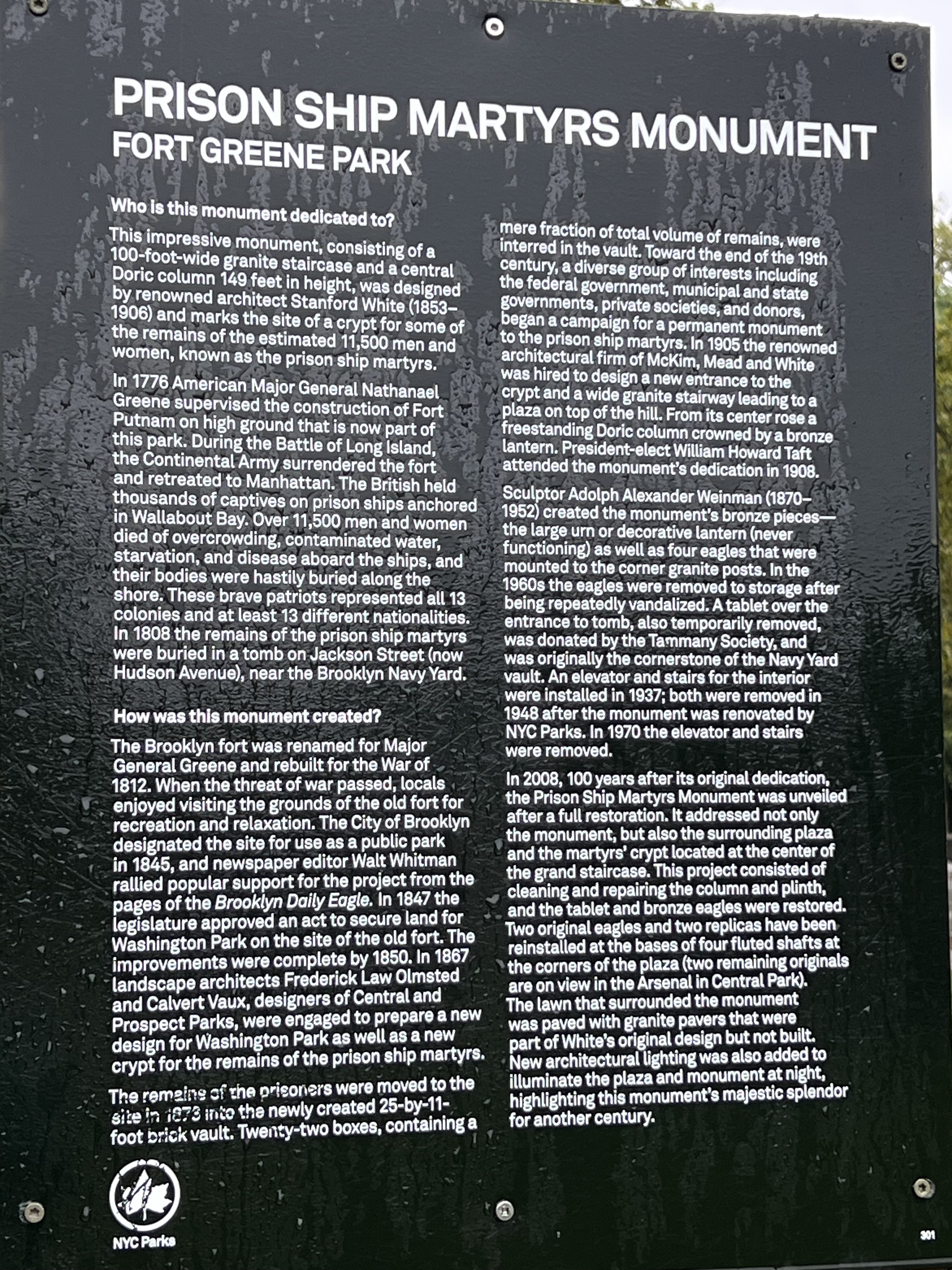
The NYC Department of Parks and Recreation sign located next to the monument.

In the first half of the 20th century efforts were made to seek a national designation. However, the U.S. Department of the Interior declined at the time and noted that the prisoners didn't die at the site itself. Currently, the New York City Department of Parks and Recreation is responsible for the preservation and supervision of the monument. A budgetary study was conducted from March 6, 2006, to September 5, 2008, on electrical improvements and the cost estimated at $341,000. The overall restoration cost for the monument from 2006 to 2008 was estimated at $5,100,000.

On April 11, 2013, U.S. Congressman Hakeem Jeffries introduced the Prison Ship Martyrs' Monument Preservation Act, which would have directed the Secretary of the Interior to study the suitability and feasibility of designating the Prison Ship Martyr's Monument as a unit of the National Park System. The study would look at what it would cost to run the park and how its proposed designation as a National Park would affect the surrounding area. The House voted on April 28, 2014 to pass the bill in a voice vote. The Department of the Interior supported the bill. The National Park Service said that "the monument commemorates the sacrifice over more than 11,000 patriots during the American Revolution." Rep. Yvette Clarke, who co-sponsored the bill, argued that the bill was a good idea because "this monument commemorates not only the sacrifices of soldiers in the Revolutionary War who dedicated themselves to the cause of liberty, but a reminder than even in wartime we must protect basic human rights. These thousands of deaths were an atrocity that should never occur again." Rep. Jeffries said that "as one of America's largest revolutionary war burial sites and in tribute to the patriots that lost their lives fighting for our nation's independence, this monument deserves to be considered as a unit of the National Park Service."

== See also ==
- Prisoners in the American Revolutionary War
- List of British prison hulks
