= Bust of Edward Snowden =

2015 sculpture of American whistleblower

Coordinates: 40.6918°N 73.9756°W

- Prison Ship Martyrs' Monument 2.0
- Artists: Sculptor Doyle Trankina; Andrew Tider, Jeff Greenspan
- Completion date: April 6, 2015
- Type: Bust
- Medium: Hydrocal
- Subject: Edward Snowden

The bust of Edward Snowden, called Prison Ship Martyrs' Monument 2.0 by its creators, was an ephemeral, illegally installed public sculpture of Edward Snowden, an American whistleblower who leaked classified information from the National Security Agency (NSA) and was charged with federal crimes as a result. (Note: Snowden "leaked thousands of classified National Security Agency documents that exposed mass surveillance by the government" and was charged with violation of the Espionage Act. In 2013, he received asylum in Russia.) The bronze-like bust was placed in Fort Greene Park in Fort Greene, Brooklyn, New York City, on April 6, 2015. This sparked outrage by the Society of Old Brooklynites. It was attached to a Doric column on the perimeter of the park's Prison Ship Martyrs' Monument, (Note: The Snowden sculpture was attached to an ancillary pillar—a smaller, peripheral Doric column on the corners of the Monument—and not to the central 149 feet (45 m) column that includes the crypt.) a memorial and crypt which honors and inters the more than 11,500 American prisoners of war who died in the American Revolution while housed on British prison ships. (Note: The monument's dedication plaque estimates that 11,500 prisoners of war died in the prison ships, but others estimate the casualty count as high as 18,000.)

Affixed atop an existing column, the bust was mounted by three anonymous artists and their helpers, who were dressed in white construction helmets and reflective vests in imitation of Parks Department workers, early in the morning of April 6, then covered and taken down by NYC Parks officials later that day. A hologram tribute to Snowden was subsequently installed after the sculpture was removed.

== Development and design ==
The piece was conceived in 2014 by two artists from New York City and a sculptor from the West Coast. The sculptor volunteered his time and skill in creating the bust, with the piece eventually costing thousands of dollars to create over six months. (Note: "It's easily a 30 grand project ... If it were bronze, it could be a $100,000 piece of artwork, maybe more.") The artwork consisted of a 4-foot (1.2 m) high, 100-pound (45 kg) bust of Snowden on top of a Doric column, with a Plexiglas stand with Snowden's name on it.

The piece was fused to Fort Greene Park's Prison Ship Martyrs' Monument which commemorates American prisoners of war who died aboard British prison ships, in the pre-dawn hours of April 6, 2015. The sculptor recommended that the two artists create a bust after they had suggested a life-size statue of Snowden. The bust was made from Hydrocal, a plaster-like substance resembling bronze in appearance, which was then fixed to the pre-existing column with a non-damaging adhesive. The piece was designed to be similar in style to other sculptures in the park. (Note: Both design and color "expertly match[ed]" the existing motif and sculptures "from its bronze patina finish to Snowden's hair—which mimics the texture of the feather on the eagle." The lettering for Snowden's name was "befitting of a monument".)

While it was very important to the artists that the piece be more than just a prop or papier-mache effigy, they also wished not to damage the surface to which the bust would be bound. After some debate, they decided on an adhesive that would firmly hold the head in place, yet could be removed without marring the monument. The sculpture had Snowden's name at its base, consistent with the names on the bases of other sculptures in the park.

The Guardian newspaper expressed the view that the bust also looked like the former White House press secretary Jay Carney and some people thought it looked more like him than it did Snowden.

Prison Ship Martyrs' Monument 2.0 is one of at least six sculptures and monuments to Snowden that have appeared around the world. (Note: Another such sculpture is the hologram that replaced this sculpture after its removal (see "Aftermath" section).) In October 2014, a statue of Snowden appeared in Union Square, Manhattan, near Henry Kirke Brown's statue of Abraham Lincoln. It was shown in conjunction with the Art in Odd Places festival and was sculpted by Jim Dessicino, a Delaware artist. One of the bust's observers compared Snowden to Daniel Ellsberg, who leaked the Pentagon Papers to The New York Times. (Note: Although the statue went unrecognized by most passersby, one opined: "He's our generation's Daniel Ellsberg ... What he did needed to be done.")

== Installation ==
The creators of the sculpture, who were dubbed "guerrilla artists" by some in the media, released a statement to the Animal New York website detailing their motivations and documenting the bust's installation in exchange for anonymity. (Note: "The artists, with the condition that they wouldn't be identified, allowed Animal New York to tag along and film the covert installation of what they call 'Prison Ship Martyrs' Monument 2.0.'") In their statement, the artists said:

We have updated this monument to highlight those who sacrifice their safety in the fight against modern-day tyrannies. It would be a dishonor to those memorialized here to not laud those who protect the ideals they fought for, as Edward Snowden has by bringing the NSA's 4th-Amendment-violating surveillance programs to light. All too often, figures who strive to uphold these ideals have been cast as criminals rather than in bronze ... Our goal is to bring a renewed vitality to the space and prompt even more visitors to ponder the sacrifices made for their freedoms. We hope this inspires them to reflect upon the responsibility we all bear to ensure our liberties exist long into the future.

The artists also expressed their dismay with perceived public apathy at Snowden's revelations.

While anticipating the sculpture's probable demise, (Note: "The artists are fully aware of the bust's inevitable destruction and have left themselves a few options, including one that involves deploying an army of mini-Snowden heads. 'We have a full size mold that can be poured again and its been 3D rendered, so we have the ability to print smaller ones at scale,' they said.") the creators told Mashable on April 6, 2015 that they "hope New York will embrace and protect this piece, much as when the Wall Street Bull was granted a permanent public home after its guerrilla placement. Even though it's already on it's [sic] way towards being removed, (Note: The statue had been removed at 1:30 pm on April 6, 2015, so the Mashable interview was probably conducted before then.) the possibility exists for the city to make the piece available for public viewing in a sanctioned way."

The unsanctioned bust had appeared a few hours after HBO's broadcast of John Oliver's Last Week Tonight interview with Snowden in Moscow.

== Removal and aftermath ==
Local residents had varied responses. The sculpture was up for only 12 to 13 hours before it was covered by blue tarpaulin and bound with rope at 12:30 pm on April 6, 2015, almost immediately after an official discovered it, then taken down an hour later. Calling it an "art prank", investigators from the New York City Police Department's Intelligence Division reportedly gathered DNA and examining other evidence in an attempt to determine the identity of the artist or artists. According to a spokesperson for the New York City Department of Parks and Recreation, "[t]he erection of any unapproved structure or artwork in a city park is illegal." Some passersby were annoyed at the covering of the bust, however. (Note: "Pedestrians ... – a mix of dogwalkers, skateboarders, joggers and Fort Greene locals enjoying a day off – mostly expressed bemusement and irritation that the city had covered the column. One man wandered by to ask: 'When's the unveiling?' A dogwalker ... said she thought the covering up ironic, considering Snowden's actions. 'I think he's actually upholding our values, what we believe in.' Others said they liked the art. 'It's all about exposure, right? They should uncover the tarp,' said Julia.")

The bust was being held at the NYPD's 88th Precinct pending the investigation's outcome.

Hours after the sculpture was removed, a group of New York artists calling themselves the Illuminator Art Collective—unrelated to the three artists who created the bust—used smoke and projection equipment to create an ephemeral "hologram" image of Snowden in place of the missing sculpture. This projection included Snowden's face above one of the pillars, as well as "Snowden" in white letters at the bottom of the pillar. Collective artists said, "Our feeling is that while the State may remove any material artifacts that speak in defiance against incumbent authoritarianism, the acts of resistance remain in the public consciousness. And it is in sharing that act of defiance that hope resides." (Note: The Snowden Hologram was intended to maintain the message and express solidarity with the unknown artists "who installed the now-expunged statue.") The original artists said they were "touched" to see their bust and nameplate "reinstalled" with the use of light, adding that they were "surprised to see the way the statue was covered up before its removal, as though it were a profane statement."

New York City has had a number of pieces of street art, like the Charging Bull, which have become cultural icons and tourist attractions. An online petition sought the return of the bust to the Prison Ship Martyrs' Monument.

The New York Daily News reported on April 14, 2015, that Ron Kuby, a lawyer representing the unidentified artists, had asked New York City Police Commissioner Bill Bratton to return the sculpture to its creators. Kuby stated, "The statue itself is not contraband. Whatever the right of the Parks Department to remove an unauthorized sculpture, that does not translate into the right of the police to indefinitely detain a work of art." The artists planned to submit an application for authorized public display, and a Manhattan art gallery also expressed interest in exhibiting the Snowden sculpture.

== Return of sculpture ==
After negotiations with the artists' attorney, the city returned the sculpture on May 6, 2015, assessing each artist a $50 fine for non-criminal trespassing due to their having illegally entered Fort Greene Park at night. Ron Kuby promised his clients' fines would be "promptly paid", and expressed gratitude that potential removal and storage fees for the sculpture were waived. A police summons identified the artists as Andrew Tider and Jeff Greenspan.

The undamaged bust had its first post-police custody exhibition from May 8–17 at The Boiler in Brooklyn, in a show titled anonymity, no longer an option. The artists were reportedly applying to have the sculpture legally exhibited by New York City through the city's "Art in the Parks" program: "This time they're dotting their i's and crossing their t's", Kuby said.

It was thereafter exhibited at the Brooklyn Museum.
