= HMS Jersey (1736) =

Ship of the line of the Royal Navy

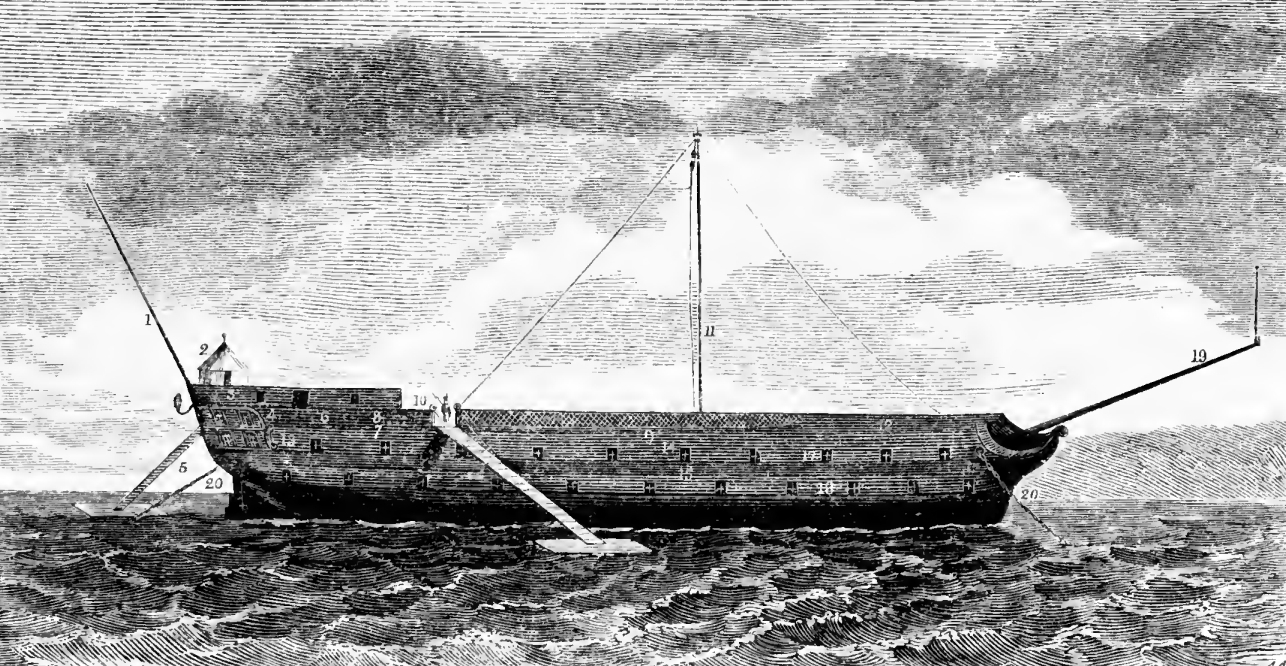
- The Jersey Prison Ship as moored at the Wallabout near Long Island, in the year 1782

History

Great Britain
- Name: HMS Jersey
- Builder: Plymouth Dockyard
- Launched: 14 June 1736
- Fate: Abandoned and burned to prevent capture, 1783
- Notes: Participated in: Battle of Lagos

General characteristics
- Class & type: 1733 proposals 60-gun fourth rate ship of the line
- Tons burthen: 1065 bm
- Length: 144 ft (43.9 m) (gundeck)
- Beam: 41 ft 5 in (12.6 m)
- Depth of hold: 16 ft 11 in (5.2 m)
- Propulsion: Sails
- Sail plan: Full-rigged ship
- Armament: 60 guns: Gundeck: 24 × 24-pdrs; Upper gundeck: 26 × 9-pdrs; Quarterdeck: 8 × 6-pdrs; Forecastle: 2 × 6-pdrs

HMS Jersey was a 60-gun fourth rate ship of the line of the Royal Navy, built to the 1733 proposals of the 1719 Establishment of dimensions at Plymouth Dockyard, and launched on 14 June 1736. She saw action in the War of Jenkins' Ear and the Seven Years' War, before being converted to a hospital ship in 1771. In 1780 she was converted again, this time to a prison ship, and was used by the British during the American Revolutionary War.

== Early career ==
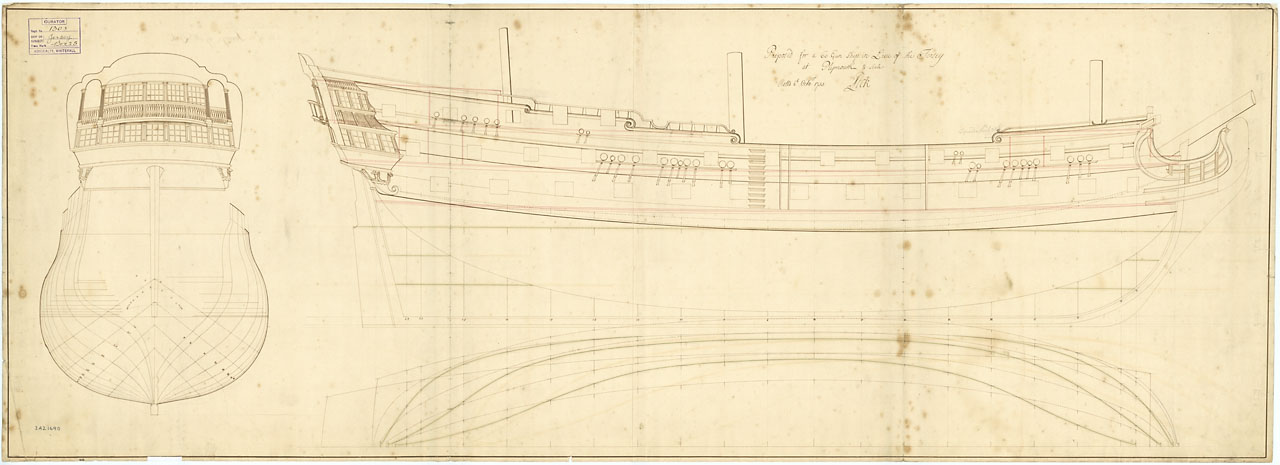
A 1733 ship plan in the Royal Museums Greenwich

Jersey was built in 1736 during a time of peace in Britain. Her first battle was in Admiral Edward Vernon's defeated attack on the Spanish port of Cartagena, Colombia, around the beginning of the War of Jenkins' Ear in October 1739. She was badly damaged in battle in June 1745, with her captain's log recording the loss of all sails and:

The braces, bowlines shot away several times, also the staysail halyards. The running rigging very much shattered. The main topsail yard shot ... the foremast shot through about the collar of the mainstay, and another wound in the after part of the mast ... the mainmast shot about two thirds up from the deck and divided [to] the starboard. Ship making 11 inches of water an hour occasioned by two shots in the counter, under the water line.

Jersey next saw action in the Seven Years' War and also took part in the Battle of Lagos under Admiral Edward Boscawen on 18–19 August 1759.

== American Revolutionary War ==
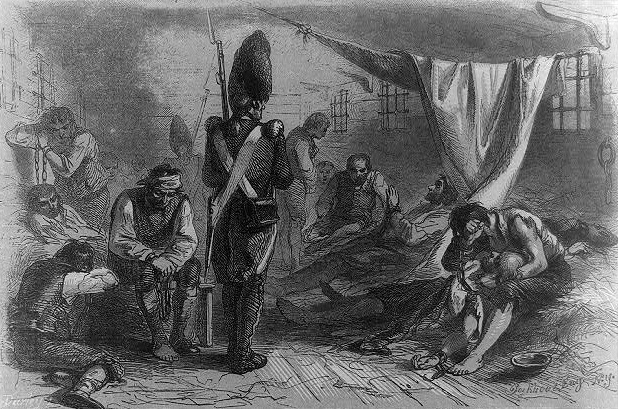
An illustration of Jersey during her time as a prison ship.

In March 1771, the aging Jersey was converted into a hospital ship. In the winter of 1779, she was hulked and converted again into a prison ship in Wallabout Bay, New York, which would later become the Brooklyn Navy Yard. There, she was used by the British to house Patriot prisoners of war, who primarily consisted of captured Continental Army soldiers. The conditions in which the prisoners onboard Jersey were kept were abysmal; men were crammed below decks with no natural light or fresh air, and the inability of Patriot forces to supply adequate food meant daily rations given to them were meager and insufficient. Up to 1,100 men were imprisoned on board a ship designed for a 400-man complement of sailors, and historians have estimated that roughly 8,000 prisoners were registered by the British as being onboard Jersey over the duration of the Revolutionary War.

British defeats during the war worsened the treatment experienced by prisoners onboard Jersey, as angered guards took out their frustrations on the ship's prisoners. Roughly 12,000 American prisoners of war died onboard British prison ships before the end of the war. As many as eight prisoners from Jersey alone were hastily buried onshore every day before the British surrendered at Yorktown on 19 October 1781. Sailor and future abolitionist James Forten was one of those imprisoned aboard her during this period after being captured in a privateer.

Christopher Vail, of Southold, who was aboard Jersey in 1781, later wrote:

When a man died he was carried up on the forecastle and laid there until the next morning at 8 o'clock when they were all lowered down the ships sides by a rope round them in the same manner as tho' they were beasts. There was 8 died of a day while I was there. They were carried on shore in heaps and hove out the boat on the wharf then taken across a hand barrow, carried to the edge of the bank where a hole was dug 1 or 2 feet deep and all hove in together. It is reported that 11700 and odd was buried at this place and in this manner.

In 1778, Robert Sheffield of Stonington, Connecticut, escaped from one of the prison ships and told his story in the Connecticut Gazette, printed 10 July 1778. He was one of 350 prisoners held in a compartment below the decks.

The heat was so intense that (the hot sun shining all day on deck) they were all naked, which also served the well to get rid of vermin, but the sick were eaten up alive. Their sickly countenances, and ghastly looks were truly horrible; some swearing and blaspheming; others crying, praying, and wringing their hands; and stalking about like ghosts; others delirious, raving and storming,—all panting for breath; some dead, and corrupting. The air was so foul that at times a lamp could not be kept burning, by reason of which the bodies were not missed until they had been dead ten days.

When the British evacuated New York at the end of 1783, Jersey was abandoned and burnt.

The U.S. Department of Defense currently lists 4,435 American battle deaths during the Revolutionary War. Another 20,000 are listed as having died in captivity, from disease, or for other reasons. Approximately 11,000 Americans died aboard prison ships during the course of the war, many from disease or malnutrition.

U.S. history magazine American Heritage published first-hand accounts of imprisonment aboard Jersey in August 1970 and accounts from a variety of British prison ships in May 1980.

== Rediscovery of Jersey ==
During October 1902 as the keel of the ship USS Connecticut was under construction at the Brooklyn Navy Yard, the Brooklyn Daily Eagle reported that HMS Jersey had been found. While pile driving a new dock, the wood from the ship was encountered precisely where the burned hulk was reported to lay after the British abandoned the ship and she was set on fire.

== Memorial ==
The remains of those that died aboard the prison ships were reinterred in Fort Greene Park after the 1808 burial vault near the Brooklyn Navy Yard had collapsed. In 1908, one hundred years after the burial ceremony, the Prison Ship Martyrs Monument was dedicated.
