= Michael E. Finnigan =

American lawyer and politician from New York

Michael E. Finnigan (1842 – November 29, 1920) was an American lawyer and politician from New York.

== Life ==
Finnigan was born in 1842 in New York City. He attended St. Vincent de Paul Academy. He entered the New York Normal School, where he planned to study to become a teacher, before his parents convinced him to change his plans.

Finnigan moved Flatbush, New York when he was young. He was a foreman during the construction of Prospect Park, and the Prospect Park Lake was built under his supervision. He later worked as a superintendent for the Coney Island and Brooklyn Railroad, and it was under his supervision that the first open horse car started running to Coney Island.

Finnigan studied law under Anthony Barrett, and at the age of 51 was admitted to the Bar. He became a prominent title search and realty lawyer. He served as an official searcher in the Kings County Register's Office for 30 years. He later worked as an independent searcher and conveyancer. He was the first lawyer in the state to be admitted to practice as an official examiner of titles under the Torrens system. He also was the confidant and personal lawyer of Hugh McLaughlin, who secured him his first political position as official searcher.

In 1892, Finnigan was elected to the New York State Assembly as a Democrat, representing the Kings County 17th District. He served in the Assembly in 1893 and 1894. While in the Assembly he introduced one bill for the annexation of New Utrecht to Brooklyn, and another that allowed all the towns in Kings County to vote on if they should be annexed to Brooklyn. He also secured passage of a bill that created the Block Indexing System, and when he was later appointed Superintendent of the Records he helped put the new system in place. From 1898 to 1902, he served as Assistant Corporation Counsel, in charge of the Bureau of Street Openings.

In 1868, Finnigan married Delia A. Woleman. Their children were Frank E., Florence E., Violet E., and Augusta B. He was a member of the Carleton Club, the Constitution Club, the Emerald Society, the St. Patrick Society, the Society of Old Brooklynites, the Brooklyn Chamber of Commerce, and the Royal Arcanum. He also served as a member of the Kings County Democratic General Committee.

Finnigan died at home in Manhattan Beach on November 29, 1920. He was buried in St. John Cemetery.

New York State Assembly
Preceded by District Created	New York State Assembly; Kings County, 17th District; 1893	Succeeded by James Scanlon (Brooklyn)
Preceded by Patrick McGowan (Brooklyn)	New York State Assembly; Kings County, 6th District; 1894	Succeeded by Edward M. Clarkson
