= Society of Old Brooklynites =

The Society of Old Brooklynites is one of the New York City borough's oldest civic organizations. It was founded in 1880 to celebrate Brooklyn's history as an independent city and to help connect the local business community.

== History ==
The society was founded by John W. Hunter, a former Mayor of Brooklyn. It holds meetings at the Brooklyn Surrogate's Courtroom. Membership currently requires individuals to have lived in Brooklyn for at least 25 years. The group rose to prominence combatting the merging of New York City with Brooklyn. It termed this "The Great Mistake of 1898."

== Notable events ==
The Society of Old Brooklynites has hosted an annual memorial for the Prison Ship Martyrs' Monument every year since President Taft dedicated the monument in 1908. The society also has an annual event there honoring the 1776 Battle of Brooklyn. An unauthorized Bust of Edward Snowden was briefly placed in the park in 2015 and sparked outrage by the society.

== Notable members ==
- David A. Boody
- Samuel Booth
- Charles J. Dodd
- Michael E. Finnigan
- John W. Hunter
- Wilhelmena Rhodes Kelly
- Seth Low
- Marty Markowitz
- John Oakey
- Marjorie Parker Smith
- Walt Whitman
- Myrtle Whitmore
- Daniel D. Whitney
