= Myrtle Whitmore =

American politician

Myrtle Whitmore was a New York-based politician and former Commissioner of the New York City Housing Authority. She died on November 5, 2020.

== Appointments ==
In 1996, Whitmore was appointed as a board member of the New York City Housing Authority by Rudy Giuliani.

== Recognition ==
Whitmore was recognized in 2017 by the Society of Old Brooklynites. Here, she also served as director.

== Media appearances ==
Whitmore appeared on the Charlie Rose show called "Not in My Backyard, Pt. 1". She appeared on C Span for the Annual Black Republican forum.
She served as a fill-in for Bob Grant.
