= Prisoners of war in the American Revolutionary War =

Overview of POWs in the American Revolution

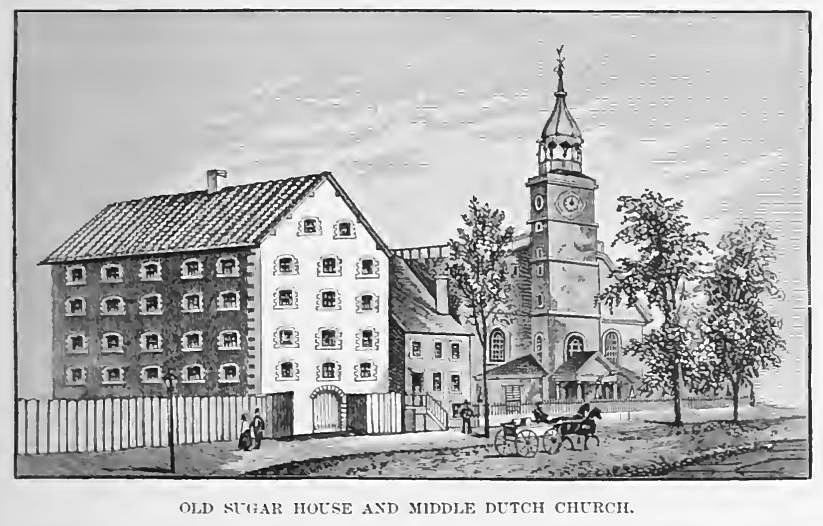
The Middle Dutch Church in New York City near Nassau and Cedar Streets is where hundreds of the enlisted men captured at the Battle of Long Island were imprisoned. The Sugar House next door also became a prison for thousands as the British captured more of Washington's troops from Fort Washington and other engagements during the retreat from New York. The site today is the location of One Chase Manhattan Plaza. (Image from about 1830.)

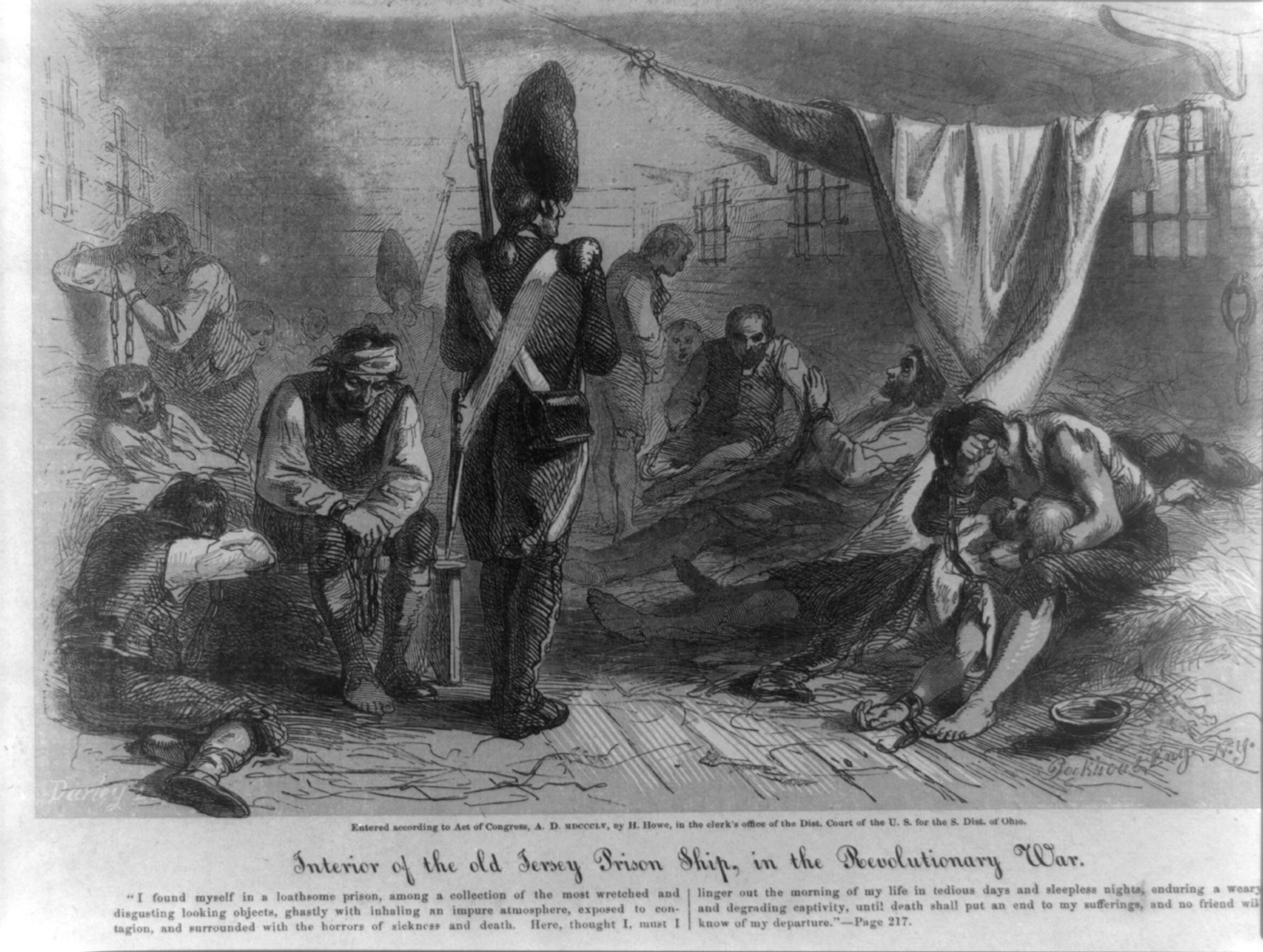
Interior of the British prison ship Jersey

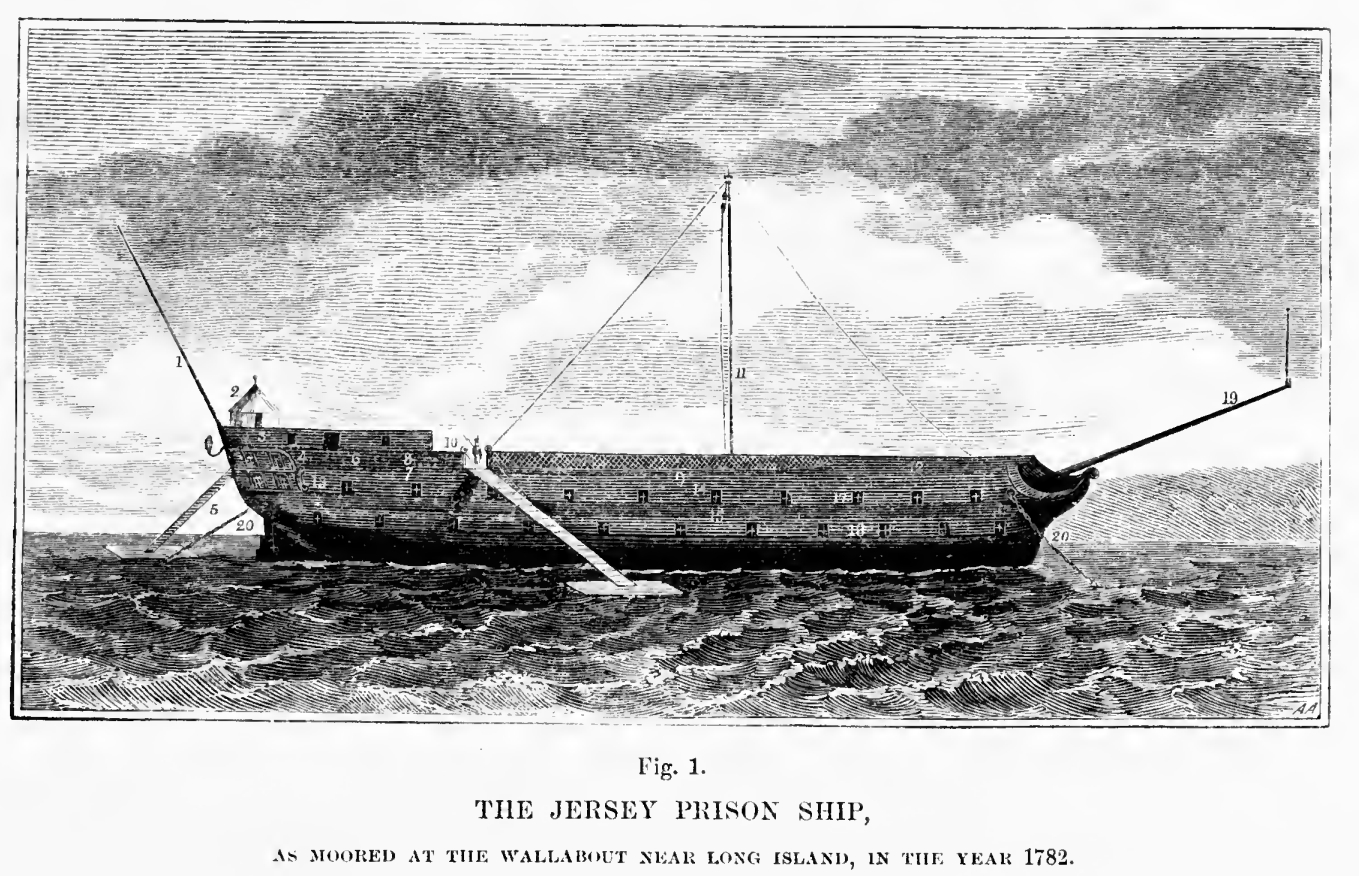
The prison ship Jersey as moored at Wallabout Bay off Long Island, in 1782

During the American Revolutionary War (1775–1783), management and treatment of prisoners of war (POWs) were very different from the standards of modern warfare. Modern standards, as outlined in the Geneva Conventions of later centuries, assume that captives will be held and cared for by their captors. One primary difference in the 18th century was that care and supplies for captives were expected to be provided by their own combatants or private resources.

== American prisoners ==
King George III of Great Britain had declared American forces traitors in 1775, which denied them prisoner-of-war status. However, British strategy in the early conflict included pursuit of a negotiated settlement, and so officials declined to try or hang them, the usual procedure for treason, to avoid unnecessarily risking any public sympathy the British might still enjoy. Great Britain's neglect, in the absence of the expected supplies from Patriots, resulted in starvation and disease. Despite the lack of formal executions, neglect achieved the same results as hanging.

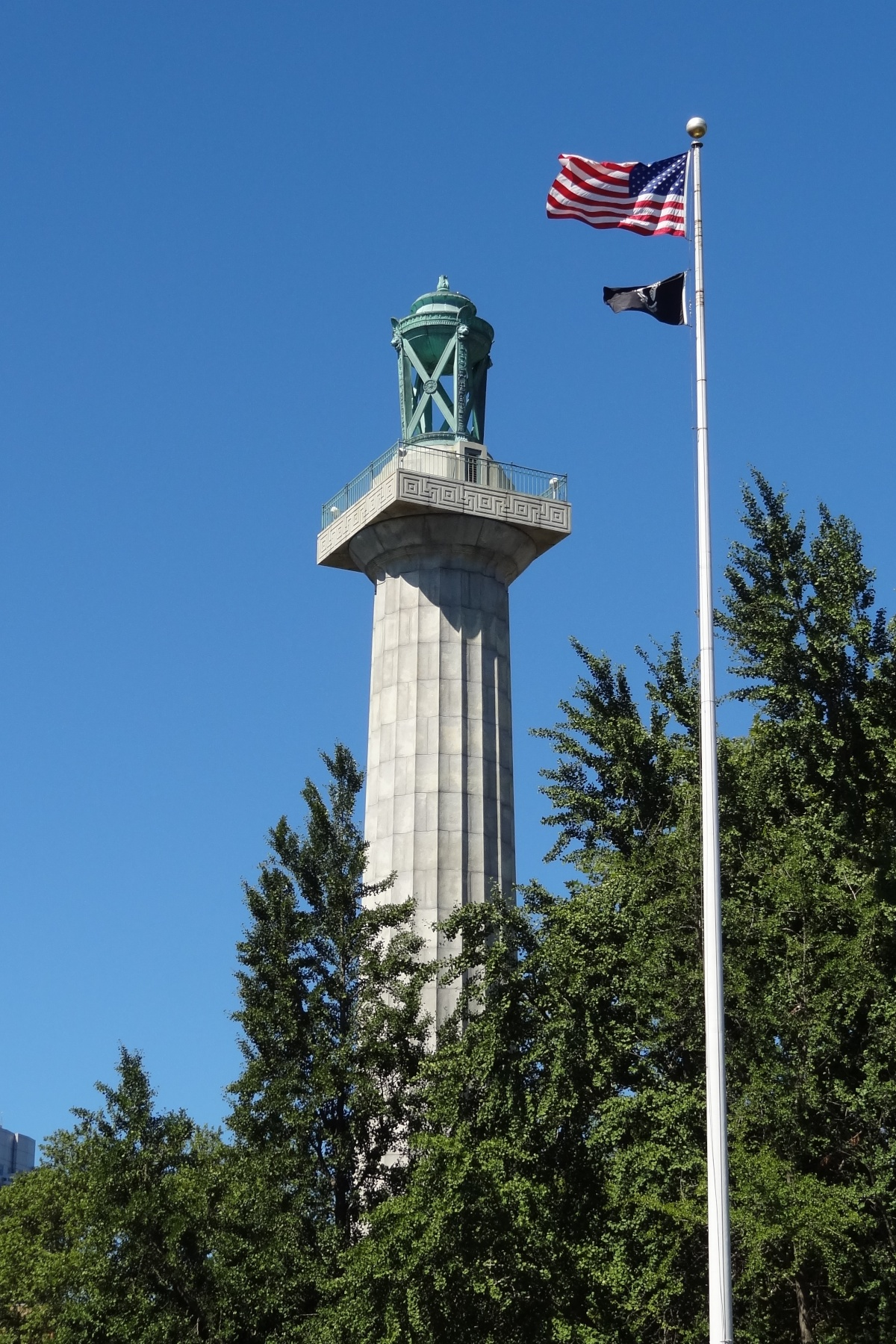
Prison Ship Martyrs' Monument Fort Greene Park

American prisoners of war tended to be accumulated at large sites, which the British were able to occupy for extended periods of time. New York City, Philadelphia in 1777, and Charleston, South Carolina, were all major cities used to detain American prisoners of war. Facilities there were limited. The occupying army could sometimes be larger than the total civilian population. The surgeon in charge of the New York hospitals housing American prisoners, Francis Mercier, was accused of killing them by poisoning and by assault, and he was ultimately executed for an unrelated murder. An estimated 20,000 Americans were held as prisoner during the war, with almost half dying in captivity.

The loyalist stronghold of St. Augustine, Florida, was also used by the British to detain patriot prisoners. Notable prisoners included Brigadier General Griffith Rutherford of the Salisbury District Brigade.

=== Prison ships ===
The British used obsolete, captured, or damaged ships as prisons. Conditions were appalling, and many more Americans died of neglect in imprisonment than were killed in battle. While the Continental Army named a commissary to supply them, the task was almost impossible. Elias Boudinot, as one of the commissaries, was competing with other agents seeking to gather supplies for Washington's army at Valley Forge. Historian Edwin G. Burrows writes that "by the end of 1776, disease and starvation had killed at least half of those taken on Long Island and perhaps two-thirds of those captured at Fort Washington – somewhere between 2,000 and 2,500 men in the space of two months."

During the war, at least 16 hulks, including the infamous HMS Jersey, were placed by British authorities in the waters of Wallabout Bay off the shores of Brooklyn, New York as a place of incarceration for many thousands of American soldiers and sailors from about 1776 to about 1783. The prisoners of war were harassed and abused by guards who, with little success, offered release to those who agreed to serve in the British Navy. Over 10,000 American prisoners of war died from neglect. Their corpses were often tossed overboard but sometimes were buried in shallow graves along the eroding shoreline.

Many of the remains became exposed or were washed down and recovered by local residents over the years and later interred nearby in the Prison Ship Martyrs' Monument at Fort Greene Park, once the scene of a portion of the Battle of Long Island. Survivors of the British prison ships include the poet Philip Freneau, Congressmen Robert Brown and George Mathews. Mathews was involved in extensive advocacy efforts to improve the prison conditions on the ships.

The American Revolution was an expensive war, and lack of money and resources led to the horrible conditions of British prison ships. The climate of the South worsened the difficult conditions. The primary cause of death in prison ships was disease, as opposed to starvation. The British lacked decent and plentiful medical supplies for their own soldiers and had even fewer reserved for prisoners. Most American POWs who survived incarceration were held until late 1779, when they were exchanged for British POWs. Prisoners who were extremely ill were often moved to hospital ships, but poor supplies obviated any distinction between prison and hospital ships.

=== Prison laborers and other prisoners of the British ===
American prisoners were also housed in other parts of the British Empire. Over 100 prisoners were employed as forced laborers in coal mines in Cape Breton, Nova Scotia; they later chose to join the Royal Navy to secure their freedom. Other American prisoners were kept in England (Portsmouth, Plymouth, Liverpool, Deal, and Weymouth), Ireland, and Antigua. By late 1782, England and Ireland housed over 1,000 American prisoners, who, in 1783, were moved to France prior to their eventual release.

Continental Army prisoners of war from Cherry Valley were held by Loyalists at Fort Niagara near Niagara Falls, New York and at Fort Chambly near Montreal.

== British, Hessian, and Loyalist prisoners ==
=== American laws of war ===
During the American Revolution, some officers from the Continental Army attempted to put the laws of war into practice regarding prisoners of war. The Americans believed that all captives should be taken prisoner. On September 14, 1775, Washington, commander of the Northern Expeditionary Force, at camp in Cambridge, Massachusetts, wrote to Colonel Benedict Arnold: "Should any American soldier be so base and infamous as to injure any [prisoner]... I do most earnestly enjoin you to bring him to such severe and exemplary punishment as the enormity of the crime may require."

After winning the Battle of Trenton on the morning of December 26, 1776, Washington found himself left with hundreds of Hessian troops who had surrendered to the Americans. Washington ordered his troops to take the prisoners in and "treat them with humanity," which they did. "Let them have no reason to complain of our copying the brutal example of the British army in their treatment of our unfortunate brethren who have fallen into their hands," Washington said. The official stance in the capturing of enemy troops was one of mercy.

=== Grievances ===
Edward G. Burrows remarks that although British and Hessian captives did "fare better on the whole than their American counterparts," there were nevertheless "instances of outrageous cruelty" against them, that "certain state governments had particularly bad records of prisoner abuse", and that there were "numerous... complaints over the years from enemy prisoners about bad food, squalor and physical abuse." The treatment of prisoners of war varied from state to state. Provisions among the prisoners also varied but generally ranged from mediocre to bad in the last years of the war.

=== British and German prisoners ===
The British and the Germans shared similar and differing experiences as POWs. The Continental Congress's policies on the treatment of POWs remained the same for all enemy combatants, and so the prisoner system was generally the same for the two nationalities. However, the British troops were valued more than the German mercenaries and thus there are many more examples of British prisoner exchanges than German.

Americans grew to hate the British more than the better-behaved Germans. The British were more likely to cause disturbances, get into fights, and oppose the guards and the militia, having been more invested in the defeat of the Americans than the Germans were.

=== Loyalists ===
Loyalists were the most hated POWs. The Continental Congress took the stance that since prisoners of war were enemy combatants, not criminals, the treatment of POWs differed from criminals. However, depending on the state, Loyalists were often treated more like criminals than POWs. Debate waged throughout the colonies whether to treat Loyalists as enemy soldiers or treasonous citizens.

=== Prison towns ===
There were very few American prisons because the Thirteen Colonies and the Continental Congress were not in a position to create new ones to imprison British and German soldiers. Instead, Congress sent most British and Hessian prisoners to local American towns and ordered local officials to hold them under strict parole.

The Continental Congress had the sole authority to decide where the prisoners went, and the local towns had little forewarning and no say in the matter. Prison towns found themselves with the burden of providing for hundreds or thousands of prisoners at a time. In towns that could not afford to feed prisoners, the prisoners were put to work to feed themselves. British and German prisoners cultivated gardens; worked for farms and craftsmen; and found other forms of unskilled labor. Local communities attempted to make prison towns as profitable as possible and often helped prisoners find jobs or sent them to other towns and states for work.

The more useful the prisoners of war were, the less economically burdensome they were on the town. A town unable to erect barracks for the prisoners was forced to house them in community churches and even citizens' homes. The Continental Congress's forcing of Americans to quarter prisoners was a major source of contention among the people.

Even when British and Hessian prisoners of war were not being held in individual houses, they were still in public view, which caused general fear, resentment, and anger. Prisoners were generally not confined to their quarters and could remain in public for the duration of the day. Security proved to be a problem for prison towns. With no official police force and the military's preoccupation with war, local militias and volunteers generally guarded the prisoners of war. Protests in prison towns were common, and people who denied prisoners entry were punished for disobeying the Continental Congress in the form of fines, jail time, and even property expropriation.

The reception prisoners received varied by location. Overall, the prisoners staying in Boston were in relative peace, remarking that the general population of Boston was civil and tolerant of them. In Virginia and other southern states, wealthy planters and plantation owners were happy to have prisoners (in Albemarle County, for example), because they could count on an even greater abundance of free or cheap labor.

In contrast, the lower class in the South was generally much less tolerant of sharing residence with abundant prisoner populations. In Maryland, the state militia directly and aggressively challenged the Continental Army when it attempted to escort the prisoners of war into the state. The South had a collective fear of insurrection that emerged because of the slave population.

== Convention Army ==
On October 17, 1777, nearly 6,000 British and Hessian soldiers of the Convention Army surrendered to the Americans. The Continental Congress was now in the position of holding a massive number of prisoners of war on American soil, an infrequent occurrence until then. It was already struggling to provide for the Continental Army. After Saratoga, it also had to provide for enemy combatants.

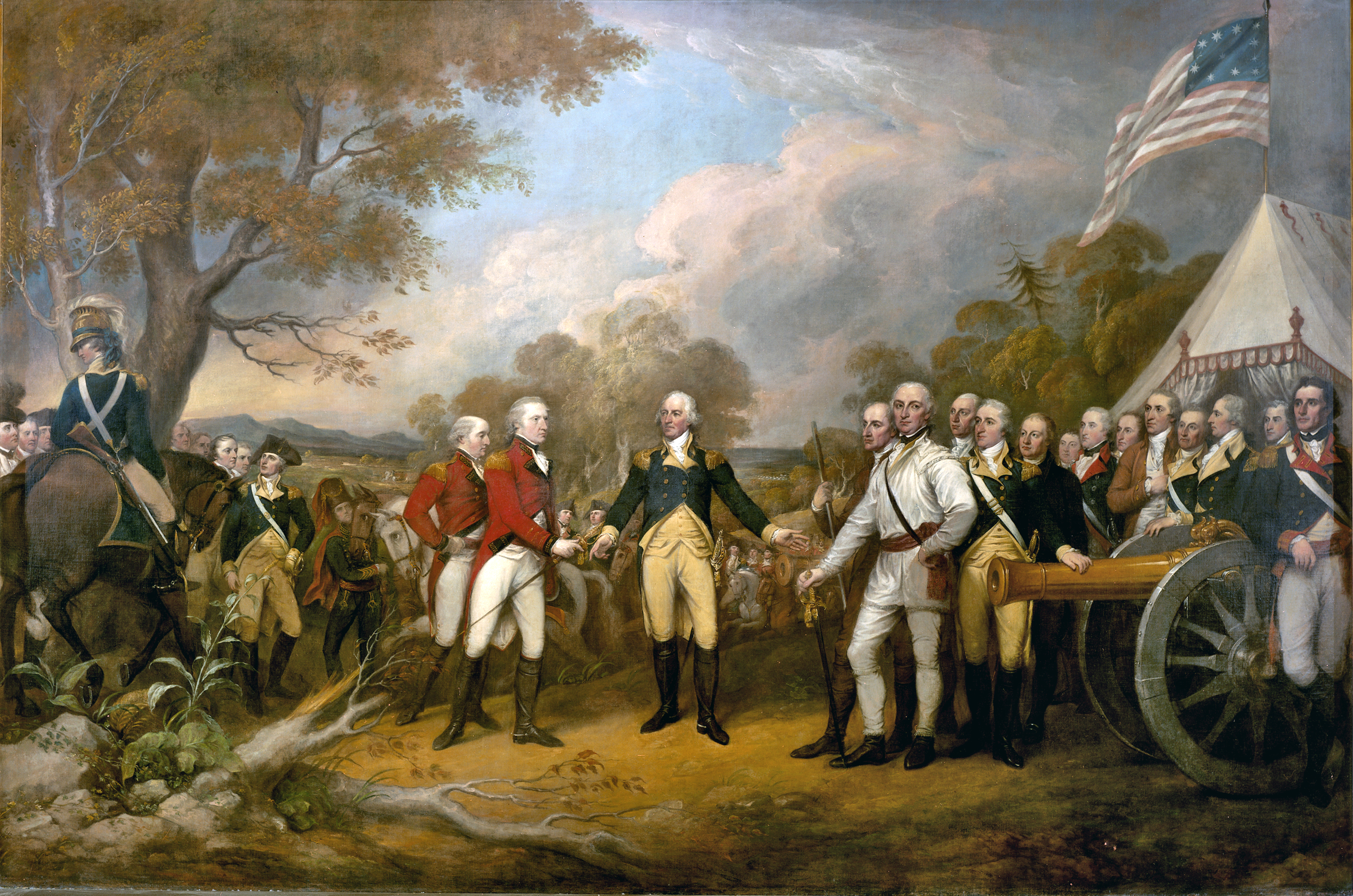
Surrender of General Burgoyne by John Trumbull, 1822; this painting hangs in the United States Capitol Rotunda

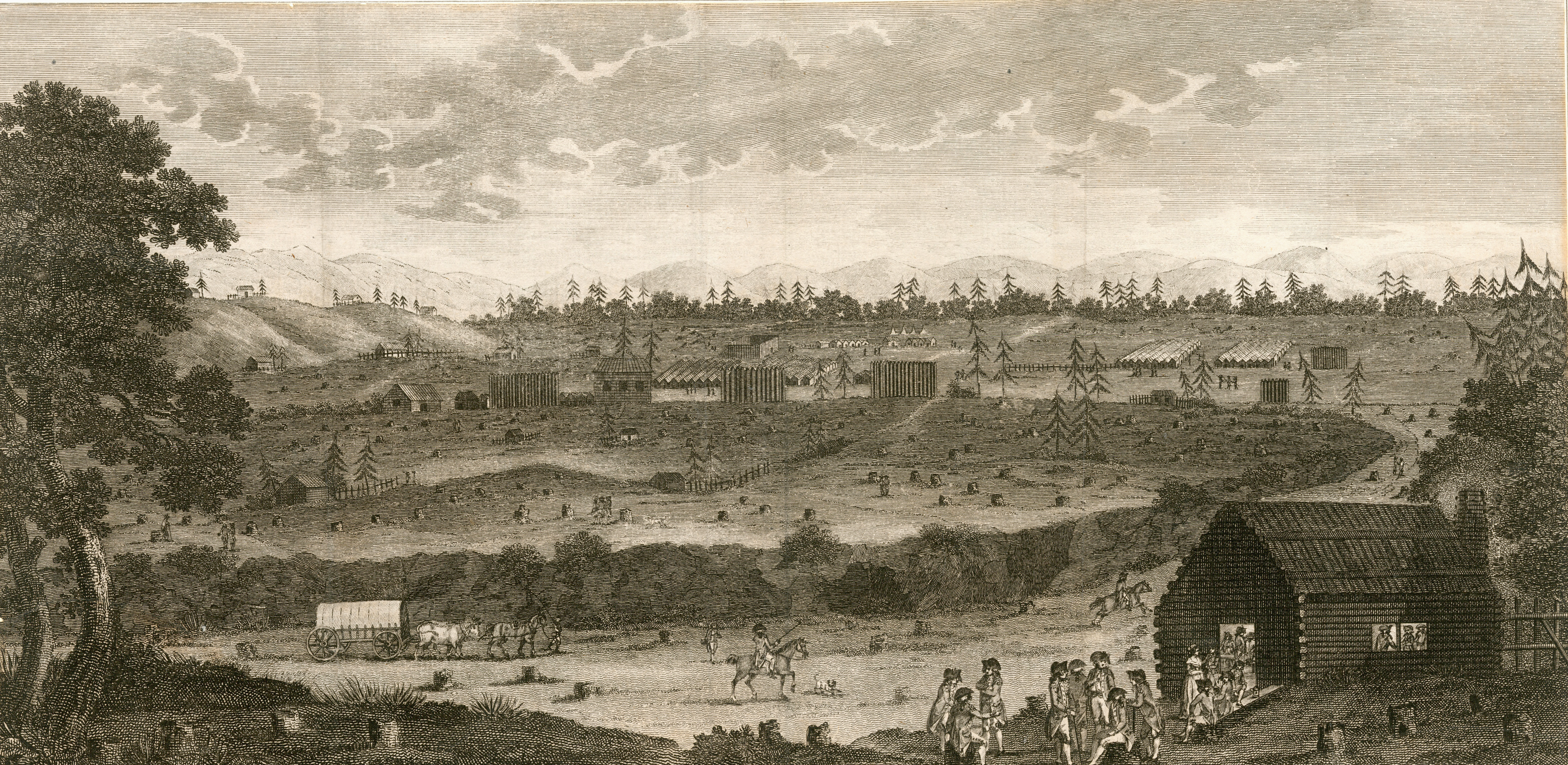
1789 engraving depicting the encampment of the Convention Army at Charlottesville, Virginia

=== Background ===
After British, German, and Canadian troops were defeated, Lieutenant General John Burgoyne and Major General Horatio Gates were unable to agree about the fate of 5,900 prisoners. In the Convention of Saratoga, the terms stipulated that the troops would be returned to Europe, never to wage war with North America again. Congress saw that condition as an abysmal part of the treaty for one of its greatest victories in the American Revolution and delayed its ratification repeatedly. General Burgoyne grew frustrated with Congress and openly condemned its actions. Congress used Burgoyne's words as evidence that he was planning to renounce the convention and suspended it until Great Britain recognized American independence. The Americans ended up holding the Convention Army for the duration of the war.

=== Marches ===
"After spending the next year in camps near Cambridge and Rutland, Massachusetts, they were sent by Congress on an overland odyssey that, by the end of the war, took them down to Virginia, then up to Maryland, into Pennsylvania again, and finally back to Rutland. Almost every step of the way they contended with meagre rations, shortages of fuel, inadequate accommodations, and physical violence."

Over the course of the revolution, the Convention Army was marched across the colonies. First, it was marched to Massachusetts and remained there for a year, and in 1778, it was moved to Virginia, where it remained for two years. In 1780, it was moved north and gradually dispersed to different states, cities, and towns for the rest of the war. The marches themselves were brutal on the soldiers, but their lives generally improved once they got to their destinations. The main reasons for the marches across America were security and finance.

Once resources became scarce in Massachusetts, Congress ordered the army to be moved South. The war effort was very different in the North as contrasted with the South. In 1780, it had become difficult to provide British and German prisoners of war and their guards with food in the South, where their presence had become a security risk. The British had started their official campaigns in the South, which brought the risk of insurrections. The Convention Army was thus ordered to march back North and was dispersed.

== Freedom ==
There were three ways for a prisoner of war to achieve freedom after being captured: desertion, exchange, or parole. Most of the time, a small militia-hired guard was tasked to supervise the imprisonment of captured British and German soldiers. The guard's ability to watch over prisoners efficiently was constantly tested. The Convention Army initially took its POW status gracefully, but only because it was under the assumption that it would be sent home within a year. When it became clear that the Americans had no intention of allowing the British to return to Great Britain until the war ended, tensions between the soldiers and the guard escalated, and desertions rose rapidly in number. Propaganda was used by Americans and by captured high-ranking British officials to dissuade troops from deserting, but it largely failed. Many of the prisoners who escaped captivity took American women with them and reared families. A large number of Hessians remained in the US after the war was over because they had married American women. Between the time of the Siege of Yorktown (1781) and the signing of the Treaty of Paris (1783), many of the Convention troops, by then mostly Germans, escaped and took up permanent residence in the United States. The American government did not have the means to prevent this.

The two other official forms of reaching freedom (parole and exchange) were common among high-ranking officers. Parole specifically dealt with individual prisoners of war, and so the process of being removed from imprisonment or house arrest and placed on parole was very simple and speedy. Most British and German prisoners of war thus sought parole, but the breaking of parole was common; many used it to make desertion easier. Some British and Hessian prisoners of war were paroled to American farmers. Their labor made up for shortages caused by the number of men serving in the Continental Army.

Exchange, however, was a complex and slow process because it involved negotiation and diplomacy between a new and inexperienced nation and a state that refused to recognize American independence. A major hindrance to exchange was the reluctance of the British to concede non-rebel status to their adversaries. A degree of mutual acceptance between Congress and the states of the principle of exchange and procedure in its implementing must have been attained by the end of March 1777. Exchange was handled primarily by Congress, instead of state powers. While state and local government had considerable power over parole, the federal government had power of negotiating exchanges.

== Reaction and impact ==
The capture of thousands of British prisoners of war in the hands of the Americans had the effect of further dissuading British officials from hanging colonial prisoners, despite the abandoned hopes for a settlement by this stage, as they feared reprisals on prisoners being held by the Americans. After the Convention Army was captured, the rate of prisoner exchanges increased dramatically as a result.

During the first years of the conflict, the Continental Congress tried to give prisoners of war the same amount of provisions as the soldiers guarding them. However, after the capture of the Convention Army, resources turned scarce and the federal government had to rely on state governments to provide for prisoners of war. From 1777 to 1778, Lieutenant General Henry Clinton was providing food for the Convention Army, but he eventually decided to end his assistance and to place the full economic burden of providing for the prisoners on the US government. To compensate for the lack of resources Congress could give to the British and German prisoners, they were moved from state to state. The marches were largely a result of diminishing provisions.

Aside from the official marching of the Convention Army, captured prisoners were paraded through cities after military victories as a form of celebration for the Americans and humiliation for their enemies. The intent of the parades was to boost morale among Americans. The Revolutionary War had devastating effects on communities, and to see clear examples of US progress and victory helped gain support for the war effort.

== Notable prisoners of war ==
- William Alexander, also known as Lord Stirling, brigadier general
- Robert Brown, U.S. congressman
- James Forten, abolitionist, businessman
- Philip Freneau, poet
- Andrew Jackson, later U.S. president
- Charles Lee, major general
- George Mathews, brigadier general, U.S. Congressman, governor of Georgia
- Samuel Miles (Philadelphia mayor, later first faithless elector, in the presidential election 1796)
- John Sullivan, major general
