= Guerrilla art =

Street art movement

Guerrilla art is a street art movement that first emerged in the UK, but has since spread around the world and is now established in most countries that already had developed graffiti scenes. In fact, it owes so much to the early graffiti movement, that guerrilla art is still referred to as 'post-graffiti art' in the United States.

Guerrilla art differs from other art forms in it has no external boundary between the image and the environment. While a traditional painting can be moved from one gallery to another without the meaning or the artistic credibility of the piece being affected, street art is environmental, the surface to which it is applied to being as fundamental to the piece's meaning as that which is applied. Without the dynamics of modern life, guerrilla art is reduced to 'art for art's sake' and would be defined by what it is as opposed to what it does.

The production of guerrilla art is focused on cause and effect, not the material piece itself. It aims to produce an effect within the minds of those people who live within the environment being altered. It does not necessarily aim to produce meaningful art in itself.

Because guerrilla art is placed in public locations, it can become an important feature for a community.

== Guerrilla artists ==
Guerrilla artists increasingly seem to be moving towards a philosophy of painting a continuous work of art, adding to it over time as less developed elements of the piece are erased by graffiti cleaning efforts or in the battle for space. Art on canvas is not guerrilla art. Although many guerrilla artists regularly produce 'trapped art', they do not generally consider it to be the same thing. This has manifested itself in a wave of new canvas styles that have a guerrilla art style, but are more comprehensive and finished. Few traditional artists would create artwork intentionally meaning for it to be mass produced with little fidelity and put up with wheatpaste. Many guerrilla artists hijack major branding for their own publicity and identity, often at odds with the brand itself. This can be seen with D*Face's hijacking of the Walt Disney signature.

It's not a movement that attempts to support or to oppose brand conditioning. It is the general public's artistic response to it.

=== Artists ===
- Banksy is an English-based graffiti artist, political activist and film director whose real identity is unknown. Their satirical street art and subversive epigrams combine dark humour with graffiti executed in a distinctive stenciling technique. Their works of political and social commentary have been featured on streets, walls, and bridges of cities throughout the world.
- In 1978 in downtown Wellington, New Zealand, Barry Thomas planted 180 cabbages forming the word 'CABBAGE' on the corner of Willis and Manners Streets where a hotel and theatre had been demolished. This 'public art project' was called The Vacant Lot of Cabbages, also known as The Cabbage Patch. Thomas's intention was to promote inner city parks rather than commercial development. The cabbages lasted six months during which time city residents added to the site and took part in poetry readings and performances.

== Use in advertising campaigns ==
The principles of guerrilla art have occasionally been adopted by corporations in various forms of guerrilla marketing, particularly viral marketing and street marketing. Such activity may be conducted either directly or through the use of front groups, and is used to promote a product or service.

Controversies have arisen over corporate guerrilla campaigns. In 2006, the Australian launch campaign for Coca-Cola Zero Sugar, which included fake blogs and public graffiti, attracted significant criticism for violating ethical standards. Similarly, in 2007, a Boston-based campaign for Aqua Teen Hunger Force caused a citywide bomb scare.

== Legal ownership of guerrilla art ==
Because guerrilla art by famous artists – most notably Banksy – can have tremendous monetary value, there is an ongoing debate over who owns it. Some argue that the law of accession means it is legally owned by the property owner. Another suggestion is that any money earned should be split between the finder and underlying property owner. Additionally, there have been calls to allow for a communal ownership of street art under municipal laws, which would mean the art belongs to the larger community.

== See also ==
- Culture jamming
- Street installation
- Subvertising
- Bust of Edward Snowden
- Yarn bombing
- Brandalism
