= Patrick McGowan (New York politician) =

American politician

Patrick McGowan (1842 – April 17, 1893) was an Irish-American politician from New York.

== Life ==
McGowan was born in 1842 in Ireland. He immigrated to America as a child, settling in Brooklyn. In 1867, he opened a retail dry goods business. He was also a large property owner in the Brooklyn Eighth Ward, and helped organize young men's Catholic literary societies in the city.

In 1877, he ran for Brooklyn alderman as an Independent, but lost to Daniel McIntyre. In 1879, he again ran for alderman but lost to James Weir, Jr.

In 1892, McGowan was elected to the New York State Assembly as a Democrat, representing the Kings County 6th District. He served in the Assembly in 1893.

McGowan died at home on April 17, 1893, from pneumonia. He was buried in Holy Cross Cemetery.

New York State Assembly
Preceded by William Emmet Shields	New York State Assembly; Kings County, 6th District; 1893	Succeeded by Michael E. Finnigan
