= Fort Greene Park =

Public park in Brooklyn, New York

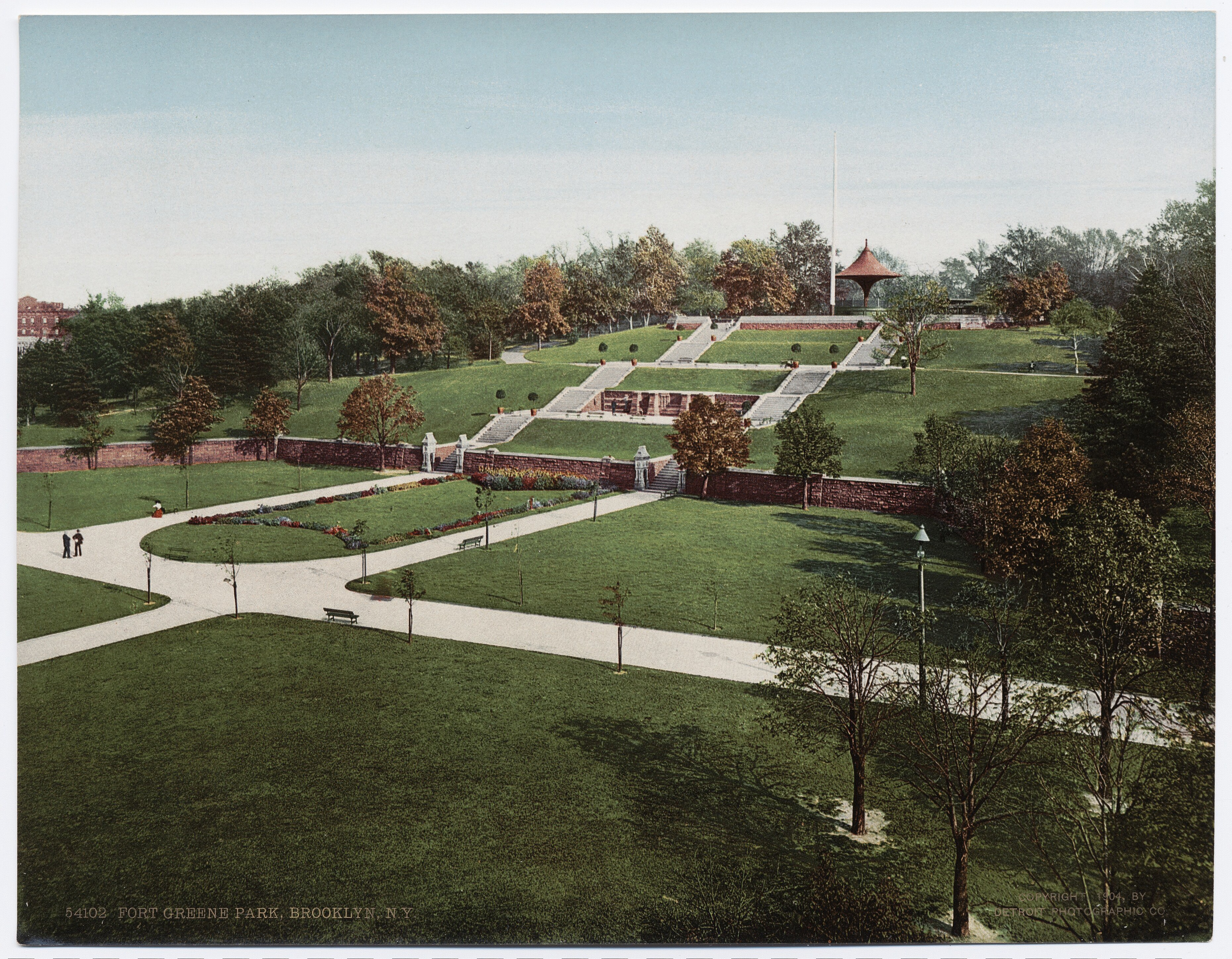
- Fort Greene Park c. 1904
- Interactive map of Fort Greene Park
- Type: Urban park
- Location: Fort Greene, Brooklyn, New York City, U.S.
- Coordinates: 40.691897°N 73.975474°W
- Area: 30.2 acres (12.2 ha; 0.0472 mi^{2}; 0.122 km^{2})
- Created: 1847
- Owner: NYC Parks
- Operator: NYC Parks
- Open: 6:00 a.m. – 1:00 a.m.

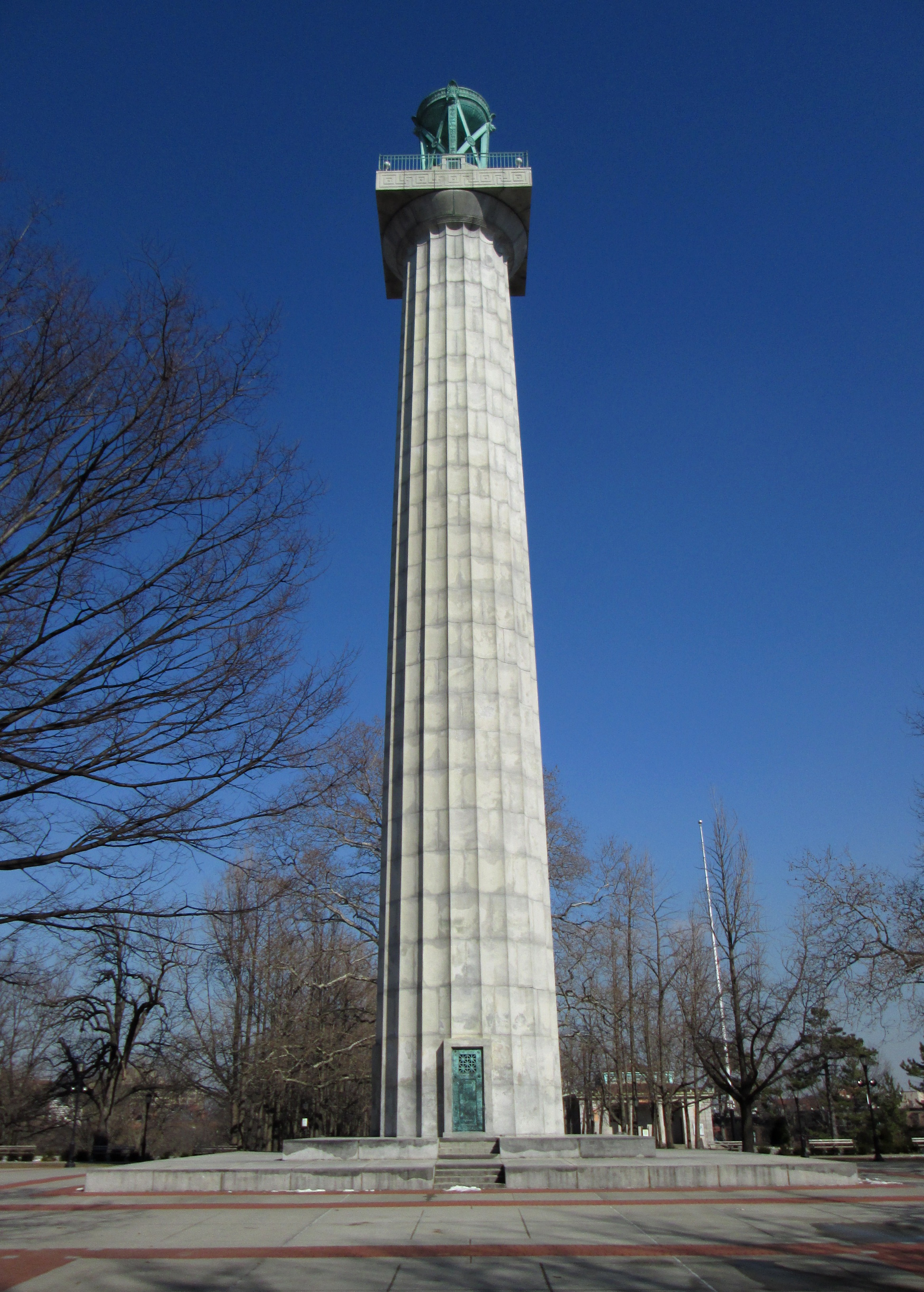
The Prison Ship Martyr's Monument

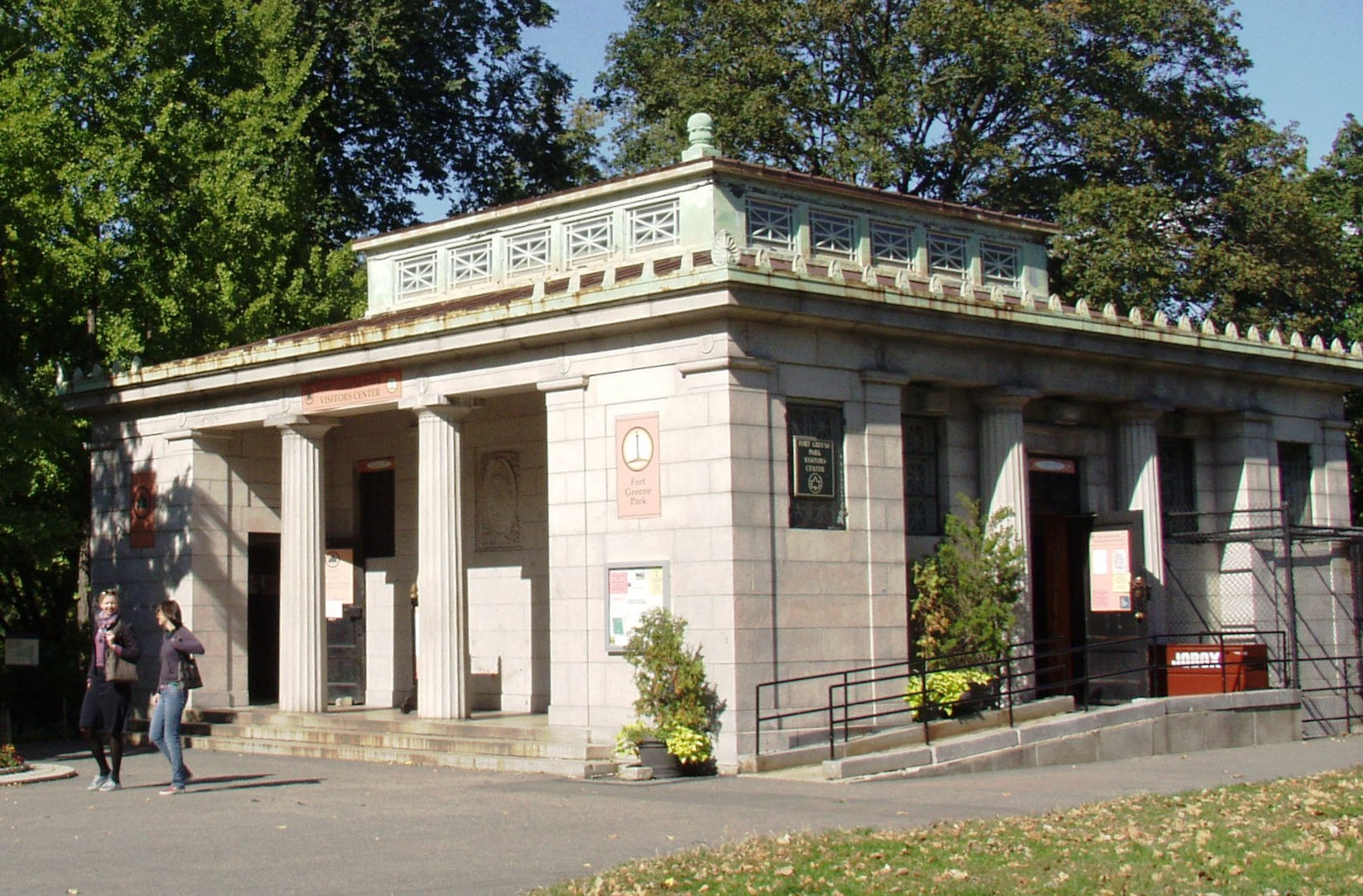
The park's information center

Fort Greene Park is a city-owned and -operated park in Fort Greene, Brooklyn. The 30.2-acre (12.2 ha) park was originally named after the fort formerly located there, Fort Putnam, itself was named for Rufus Putnam, George Washington's chief of engineers in the Revolutionary War.

Renamed in 1812 for Nathanael Greene, an American Revolutionary War hero, it was redesigned by Frederick Law Olmsted and Calvert Vaux, architects of Central Park and Prospect Park, in 1867. Fort Greene Park contains the Prison Ship Martyrs' Monument, which includes a crypt designed by Olmsted and Vaux, holding the remains of Patriot prisoners of war who died while being held on British prison ships in Wallabout Bay during the American Revolutionary War.

Across the street from its DeKalb Avenue entrance at Fort Greene Place is Brooklyn Technical High School. To its west is the oldest hospital in Brooklyn, now called the Brooklyn Hospital Center. North are the Walt Whitman Houses, one of the largest housing projects in New York City.

== History ==
Fort Greene Park includes part of the high ground where the Continental Army built fortifications prior to the Battle of Long Island, during the early days of the Revolutionary War. The site was chosen and construction supervised by General Nathanael Greene, and it was named Fort Putnam, after Rufus Putnam, George Washington's chief engineer. During the War of 1812, when the possibility of a British invasion of New York led to the re-use of the site for defense, the newly rebuilt fortification was named Fort Greene in General Greene's honor.

After the fort's military use had waned, poet Walt Whitman, then the editor of the Brooklyn Daily Eagle, strongly advocated for reclaiming the space for use as a public park. The City of Brooklyn had, by 1842, bought property around the fort from the Cowenhoven family, and in 1847 established what was then called Washington Park, Brooklyn's second park, after City Park (today's Commodore Barry Park).

In 1867, Frederick Law Olmsted and Calvert Vaux, designers of Central Park and Prospect Park, prepared a plan for the redesign of the park, the name of which was changed to Fort Greene Park.

In the aftermath of Hurricane Sandy, many parts of New York City were destroyed, including several trees in the park and the surrounding Fort Greene area.

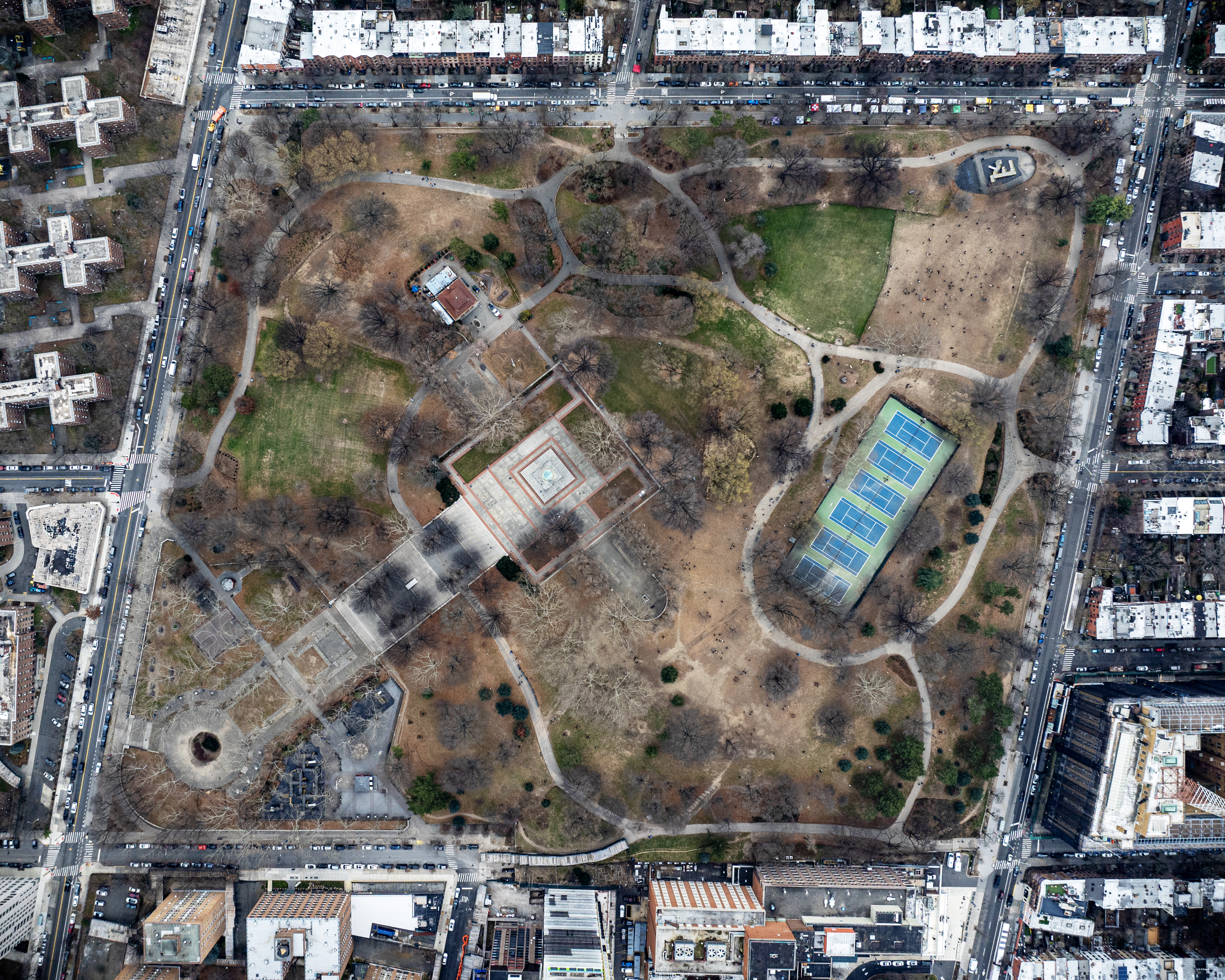

1	Basketball Court
2	Playground
3	Crypt
4	Prison Ship Martyrs' Monument

5	Visitor Center
6	Tennis Courts
7	Playground

=== Renovation plans, 2017–present ===
In February 2017, Parks Without Borders (PWB), the design unit of NYC Parks, proposed renovating the park. The renovation was to cost $24 million and include new paths, sidewalks, and recreation facilities, in addition to upgraded bathrooms and drainage systems. Public opposition gave rise to an advocacy group, Friends of Fort Greene Park. The Landmarks Preservation Commission took no vote, with one commissioner observing that the plan was "against every historic moment in the design of the park". At issue was that the renovations would eliminate design details from the late landscape architect Arthur Edwin Bye's 1970s redesign of the park. The LPC approved the plan, which would entail demolishing Bye's landscape, in November 2017.

Controversy again arose in early 2018 when NYC Parks announced plans to cut down some park trees, and a group of residents successfully sued to force the release of an internal report about the trees, a decision upheld upon appeal. As of August 2018 the renovation was in the procurement process. In January 2020, a New York Supreme Court judge ordered the city to reassess the park renovation plans to raze more than 80 trees, including 58 mature trees in the northwest section nearest the Ingersoll and Walt Whitman houses. The move was lauded by the Atlantic Chapter of the Sierra Club, as well as local residents. The city filed a notice of appeal in February 2020. State Assemblyman Walter T. Mosley contacted the city's law department and asked for a redesign.

In 2023, Friends of Fort Greene Park sued NYC Parks, claiming the agency had not conducted an environmental review for the redesign. Several residents further sued the city in April 2025 to prevent the destruction of 78 trees in the park. Friends of Fort Greene Park's lawsuit against the redesign was dismissed that July.

== Monuments ==
=== Prison Ship Martyrs' Monument ===
Fort Greene Park in autumn, from the steps in front of the Prison Ship Martyrs Monument

One of Fort Greene Park's distinctive features is the Prison Ship Martyrs' Monument. During the Revolutionary War, the British kept American prisoners on ships in Wallabout Bay under terrible conditions. Around 11,500 prisoners died from disease and malnutrition. Olmsted and Vaux envisioned a crypt to hold their remains, with an appropriate monument. It was built, and the remains of the prisoners were re-interred there in 1873. A small monument was also built.

Eventually, funds were raised for a larger monument. The architectural firm of McKim, Mead, and White won a design competition, and the monument was unveiled in 1908 by President-elect William Howard Taft. It is a 149-foot (45 m) high granite Doric column over the crypt. At the top is an eight-ton bronze urn. At night the monument is illuminated by four electric lights set in four granite shafts. Bronze eagles grace each shaft, and two cannons guard the plaza and the Martyrs' crypt below.

=== Bust of Edward Snowden ===
In 2015, a bust of the former National Security Agency contractor Edward Snowden was illicitly erected in the park and taken down by park officials the same day. The next day, it was replaced by a projected hologram.

== Events ==
The park is host to the annual Fort Greene Park Summer Literary Festival, an event featuring young writers aged 7–18 reading alongside established writers, such as Sonia Sanchez, Amiri Baraka, Gloria Naylor, Jhumpa Lahiri, and Jennifer Egan, the last two being residents of the neighborhood. The Fort Greene Park Conservancy also operates a summer concert series. The Greene Glass Project was started in 2010 to address the then-thousands of shards of broken glass in the park. The organization was hosting annual cleanups in the summer as of 2015.
