= Walt Whitman Houses =

Public housing development in Brooklyn, New York

- NYCHA property
- Location within New York City
- Coordinates: 40.693460°N 73.965920°W
- Country: United States
- State: New York
- City: New York City
- Borough: Brooklyn
- ZIP codes: 11205
- Area codes: 718, 347, 929, and 917

The Walt Whitman Houses are a housing project in Fort Greene neighborhood of Brooklyn, New York completed on February 24, 1944. The project consists of fifteen buildings, 6 and 13-stories tall with 1,659 apartment units. It covers a 18.44-acre expanse, and is bordered by St. Edward's Street, and Park, Carlton and Myrtle Avenues. It is owned and managed by New York City Housing Authority (NYCHA).

The development was named after the 19th century poet Walt Whitman, who lived and worked in Brooklyn.

== Notable residents ==
- Ol' Dirty Bastard (1968–2004), rapper
- Dana Dane (born 1965), rapper
- Bernard King (born 1956), former NBA player

== See also ==
- New York City Housing Authority
- List of New York City Housing Authority properties
