= Melillo =

Melillo is a surname. Notable people with this surname include:

- Alberto Melillo (1866–1915), Italian painter
- Angela Melillo (born 1967), Italian actress, showgirl, model, singer, and television hostess
- David Andrew Melillo (born 1988), the American former lead guitarist for the rock band Anarbor
- Eric Melillo (born 1998), Canadian politician
- Ezequiel Melillo (footballer, born 1990), Argentine professional football midfielder for Almirante Brown
- Ezequiel Melillo (footballer, born 1993), Argentine professional football midfielder for Vibonese
- Joseph V. Melillo, the executive producer at the Brooklyn Academy of Music (BAM) from 1999 to 2018
- Michael Melillo (born 1982), former American professional baseball player
- Oscar Donald "Ski" Melillo (1899–1963), American second baseman and coach

== See also ==
- Milillo
