= Fort Greene, Brooklyn =

Neighborhood in New York City

Fort Greene
- Neighborhood of Brooklyn
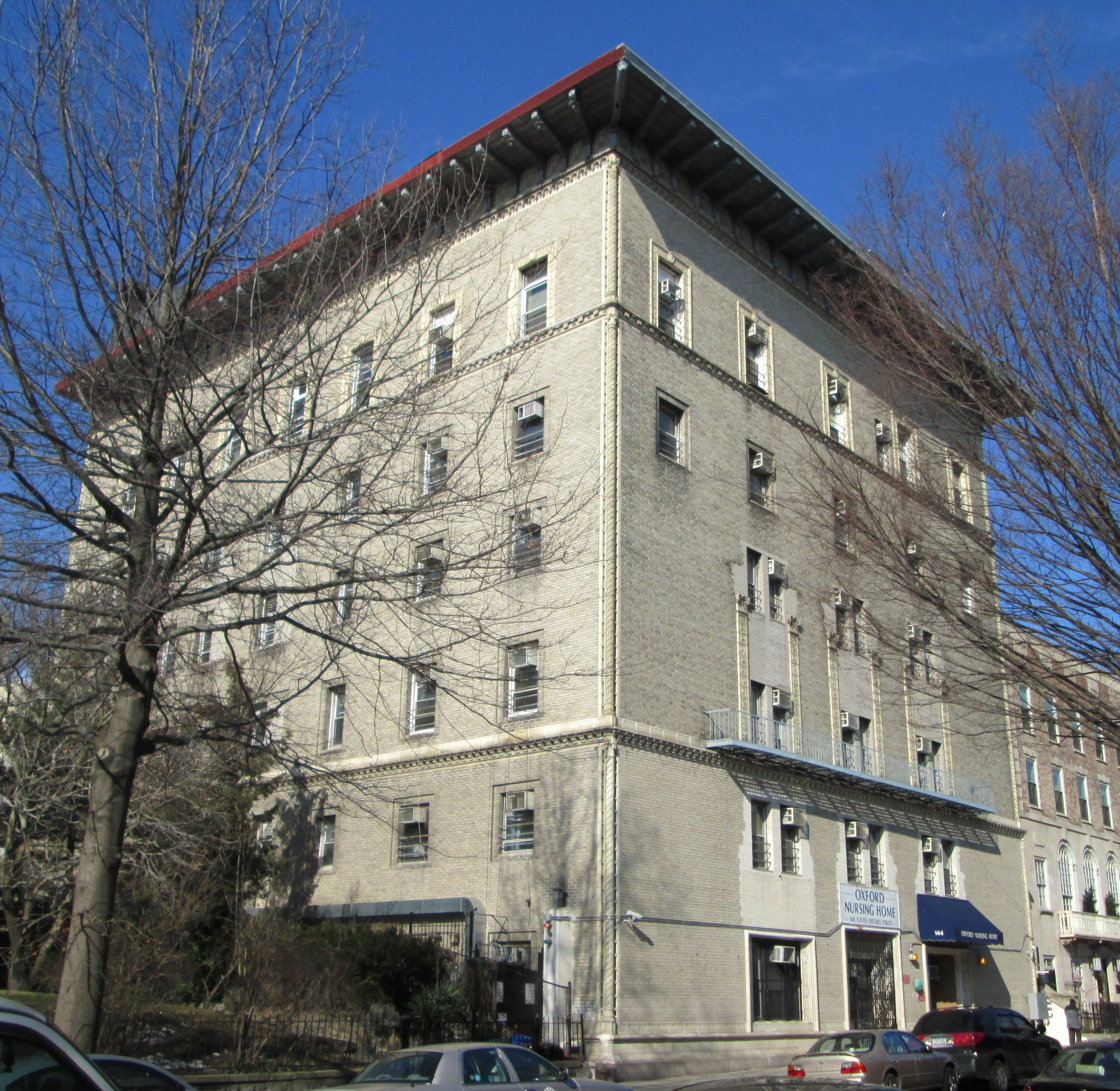
- Historic building at 144 South Oxford Street
- Interactive map of Fort Greene
- Coordinates: 40.687°N 73.975°W
- Country: United States
- State: New York
- City: New York City
- Borough: Brooklyn
- Community District: Brooklyn 2
- Named for: A fort named after Nathanael Greene

Area
  - Total: 0.548 sq mi (1.42 km^{2})

Population (2020)
  - Total: 32,938
  - Density: 60,100/sq mi (23,200/km^{2})

Ethnicity
  - White: 34.5%
  - Black: 30.0%
  - Hispanic: 17.0%
  - Asian: 11.9%
  - Others: 6.6%

Economics
  - Median income: $107,633
- Time zone: UTC−5 (Eastern)
  - Summer (DST): UTC−4 (EDT)
- ZIP Codes: 11238, 11201, 11205, 11217
- Area code: 718, 347, 929, and 917

Fort Greene is a neighborhood in the northwestern part of the New York City borough of Brooklyn. The neighborhood is bounded by Flushing Avenue and the Brooklyn Navy Yard to the north, Flatbush Avenue Extension and Downtown Brooklyn to the west, Atlantic Avenue and Prospect Heights to the south, and Vanderbilt Avenue and Clinton Hill to the east. The Fort Greene Historic District is listed on the New York State Registry and on the National Register of Historic Places, and is a New York City designated historic district.

The neighborhood is named after an American Revolutionary War era fort that was built in 1776 under the supervision of General Nathanael Greene of Rhode Island. General Greene aided General George Washington during the Battle of Long Island in 1776. Fort Greene Park, originally called "Washington Park" is Brooklyn's first. In 1864, Fort Greene Park was redesigned by Frederick Law Olmsted and Calvert Vaux; the park notably includes the Prison Ship Martyrs' Monument and crypt, which honors some 11,500 patriots who died aboard British prison ships during the American Revolution.

Fort Greene contains many examples of mid-19th century Italianate and Eastlake architecture, most of which is well preserved. It is known for its many tree-lined streets and elegant low-rise housing. Fort Greene is also home to the Williamsburgh Savings Bank Tower, which, for over 80 years, was the tallest building in Brooklyn. The neighborhood is close to the Atlantic Terminal station of the Long Island Rail Road and has access to many New York City Subway services.

Fort Greene is part of Brooklyn Community District 2, and its primary ZIP Codes are 11201, 11205, 11217, and 11238. It is patrolled by the 88th Precinct of the New York City Police Department. Politically it is represented by the New York City Council's 35th District. Fort Greene, a largely African-American neighborhood in the 20th century, has been significantly gentrified over the years, with the Black population decreasing from 41.8% in 2000 to 25.8% in 2017.

== History ==
=== Early history ===
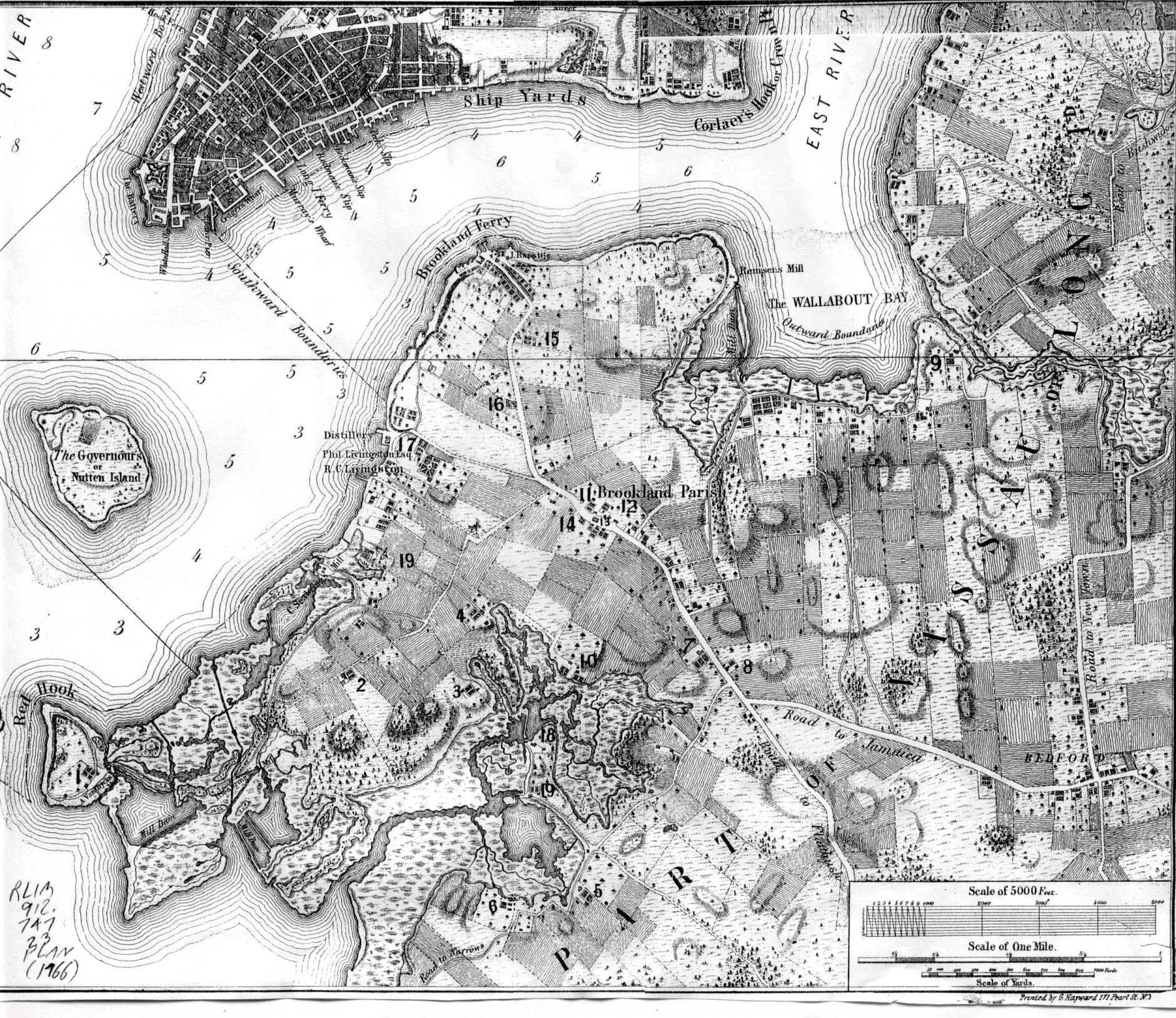
1766 map of Brooklyn

In approximately A.D. 800, a gradual movement of Native Americans advanced from the Delaware area into lower New York, ultimately settling as part of the Canarsie tribe among 13 tribes of the Algonquin Nation. In 1637, Walloon reformed Joris Jansen Rapelje purchased 335 acres (1.36 km^{2}) of Native American land from Dutch West India Company in the area of Brooklyn that became known as Wallabout Bay (from Waal Boght or "Bay of Walloons"). This is the area where the Brooklyn Navy Yard now stands on the northern border of Fort Greene. An Italian immigrant named Peter Caesar Alberti started a tobacco plantation near the bay in Fort Greene in 1649 but was killed six years later by Native Americans. In 1776, under the supervision of General Nathanael Greene of Rhode Island the American Revolutionary War era Fort Putnam was constructed. Later renamed after Greene, the fort was a star-shaped earthwork that mounted six 18-pound cannons, and was the largest on Long Island. After the American defeat in the Battle of Long Island, George Washington withdrew his troops from the Fort under the cover of darkness, a brilliant move that saved the outnumbered American army from total defeat by the British. Although the fort was repaired in advance of an expected attack on Brooklyn by the British during the War of 1812, it thereafter slowly deteriorated.

=== 19th century ===
==== Settlement ====
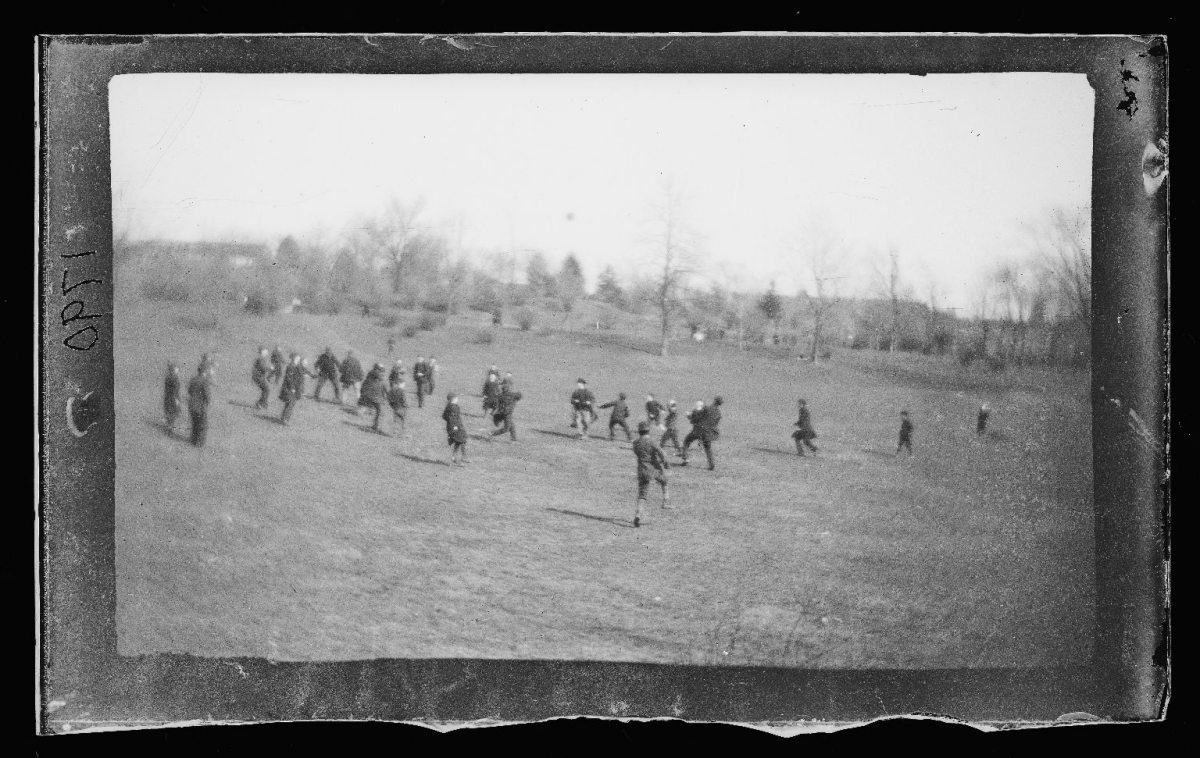
Football at Fort Greene, circa 1872–1887

In 1801, the U.S. government purchased land on Wallabout Bay for the construction of the Brooklyn Navy Yard, stimulating some growth in the area. Ferry service linking Manhattan and Brooklyn launched in 1814, and Brooklyn's population exploded from 4,000 to nearly 100,000 by 1850. Fort Greene was known as The Hill and was home to a small commuter population, several large farms—the Post Farm, the Spader farm, the Ryerson Farm, and the Jackson farm—and a burial ground. As early as the 1840s the farms' owners began selling off their land in smaller plots for development. Country villas, frame row houses, and the occasional brick row house dotted the countryside, and one of them was home to poet Walt Whitman, editor of the Brooklyn Eagle newspaper.

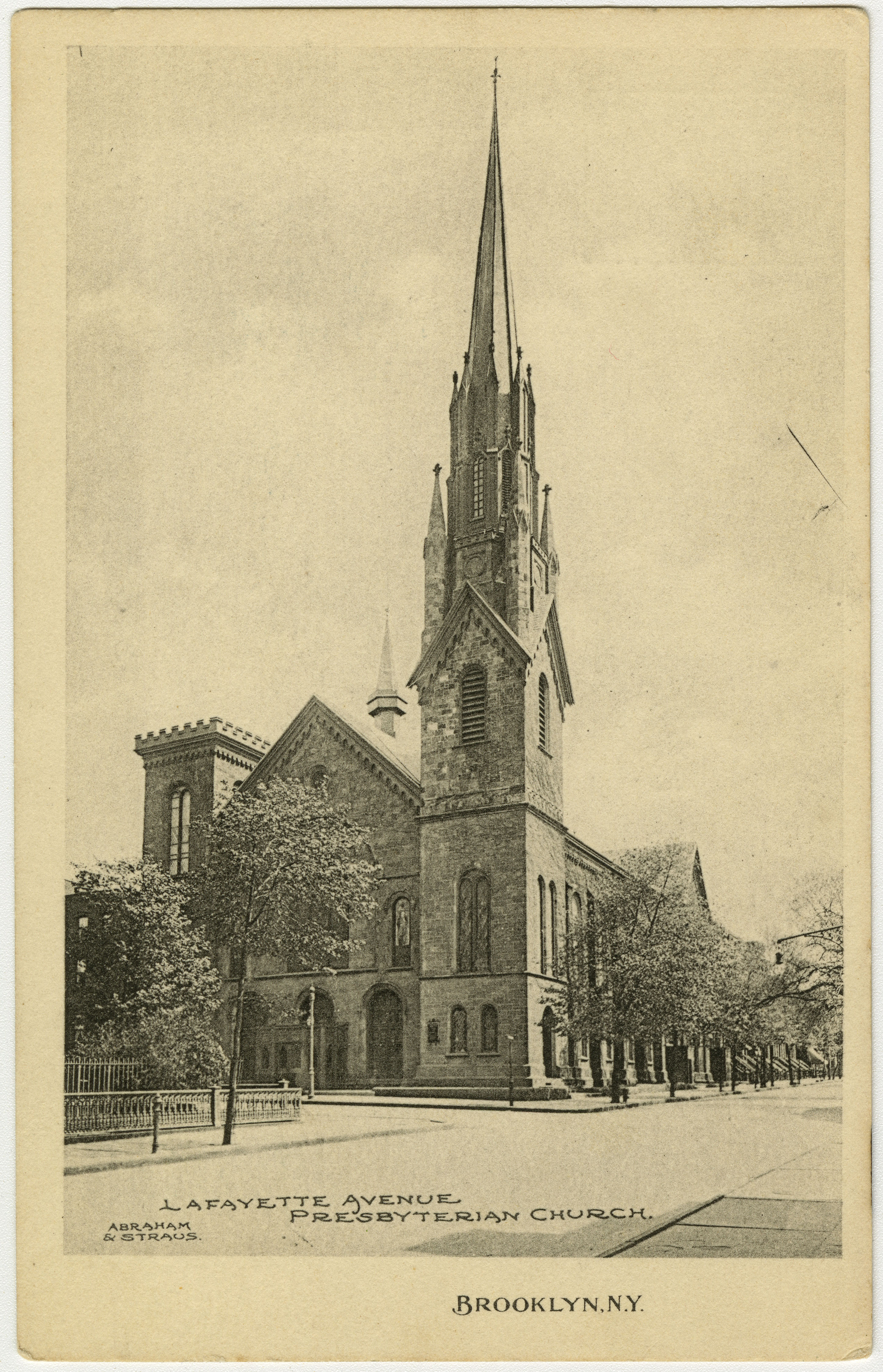
Lafayette Ave Presbyterian Church, before 1933 when its steeple was shortened

Since the early 19th century, African Americans have made significant contributions to Fort Greene's development. New York State outlawed slavery in 1827 and 20 years later "Coloured School No. 1," Brooklyn's first school for African-Americans, opened at the current site of the Walt Whitman Houses. Abolitionists formed the Lafayette Avenue Presbyterian Church in 1857, and hosted speakers such as Frederick Douglass and Harriet Tubman and also aided in the work of the Underground Railroad. Skilled African-American workers fought for their rights at the Navy Yard during the tumultuous Draft Riots of 1863 against armed hooligan bands. The principal of P.S. 67 in the same year was African American, and Dr. Phillip A. White became the first black member of Brooklyn's Board of Education in 1882. By 1870, more than half of the Black population in Brooklyn lived in Fort Greene, most of them north of Fort Greene Park.

==== Crowding ====
In the 1850s, Fort Greene's growth spread out from stagecoach lines on Myrtle Avenue and Fulton Street that ran to Fulton Ferry, and The Hill became known as the home of prosperous professionals, second only to Brooklyn Heights in prestige. During the 1850s and 1860s, blocks of Italianate brick and brownstone row houses were built on the remaining open land to house the expanding upper and middle class population. The names of the most attractive streets (Portland, Oxford, Cumberland, Carlton, and Adelphi) came from fine Westminster terraces and streets of the early 19th century. By the 1870s, construction in the area had virtually ended, and the area still maintains hundreds of Italianate, Second Empire, Greek Revival, Neo-Grec, Romanesque Revival and Renaissance Revival row houses of virtually original appearance.

As Manhattan became more crowded, people of all classes made Fort Greene their home. The unoccupied areas of Myrtle Avenue became an Irish shanty town known as "Young Dublin", In response to the horrible conditions found there, Walt Whitman called for a park to be constructed and stated in a column in the Eagle, "[as] the inhabitants there are not so wealthy nor so well situated as those on the heights...we have a desire that these, and the generations after them, should have such a place of recreation..." The park idea was soon co-opted by longtime residents to protect the last open space in the area from development.

However, The New York Times soon found that the area was too expensive for some, and that many in the area were penurious:

The poverty stricken condition of the inhabitants residing in the [Fort Greene/Clinton Hill district] of Brooklyn render it almost an unknown land.

Focusing on a certain section of the east Brooklyn area defined as "between Flushing and DeKalb Avenues, as far east as Classon Avenue and as far west as Ryerson, extending across Fulton Avenue," the Times item said the real estate boom has resulted in class conflict among a majority of the area's longtime residents (identified as "renters or squatters") and its new neighbors—middle to upper income homeowners (identified as out-priced Manhattanites attracted to the spatial wealth of Brooklyn and able to afford the high price of its grand scale Neo-Gothic brownstones.) The paper further explained the conflict as one that had existed for some time, evidenced perhaps by a letter to the editor of a local Brooklyn paper published prior to the Times profile. The author, a new homeowner, wrote:

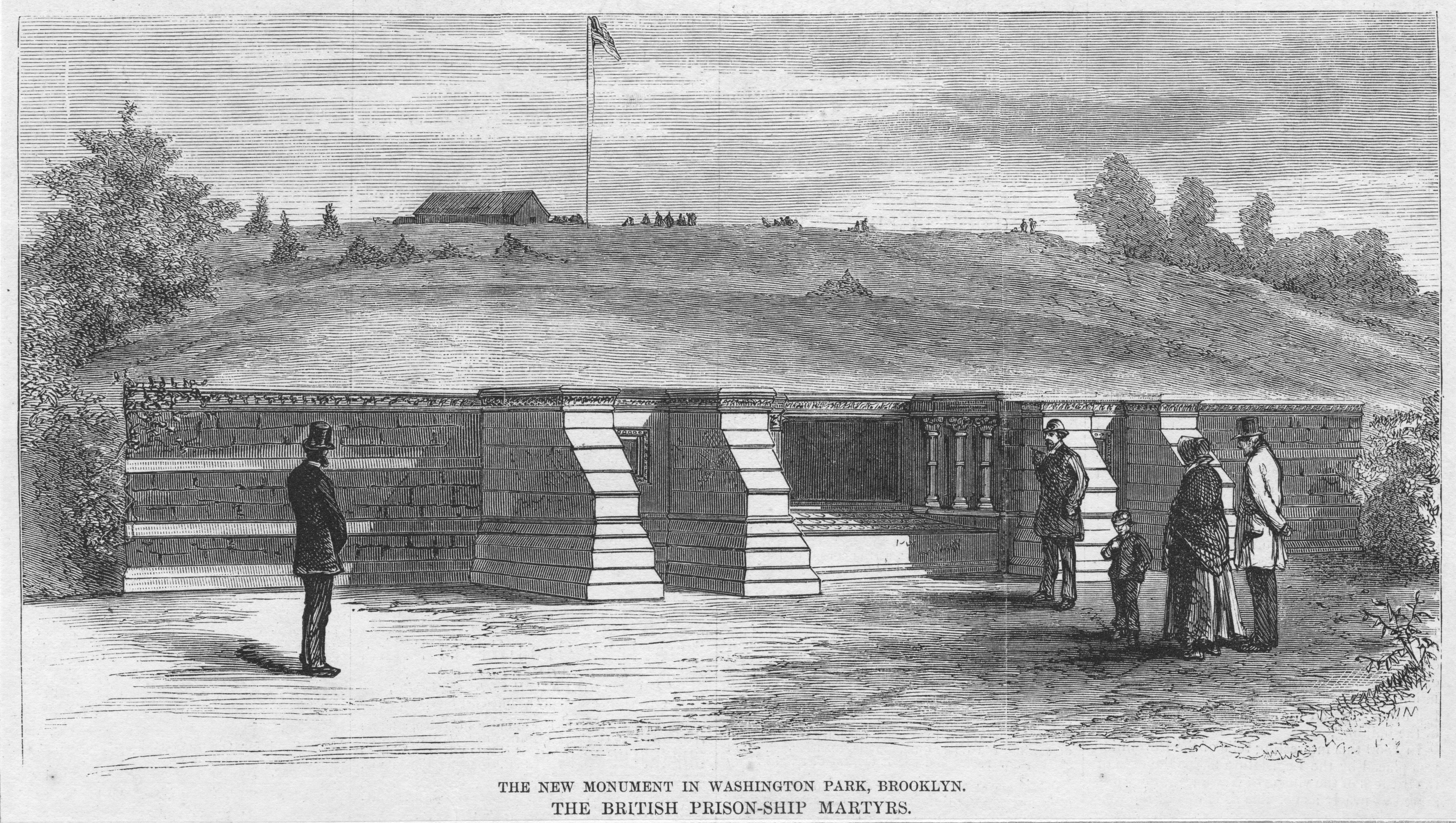
c. 1880 engraving of an earlier Prison Ship Martyrs' Monument in Fort Greene Park

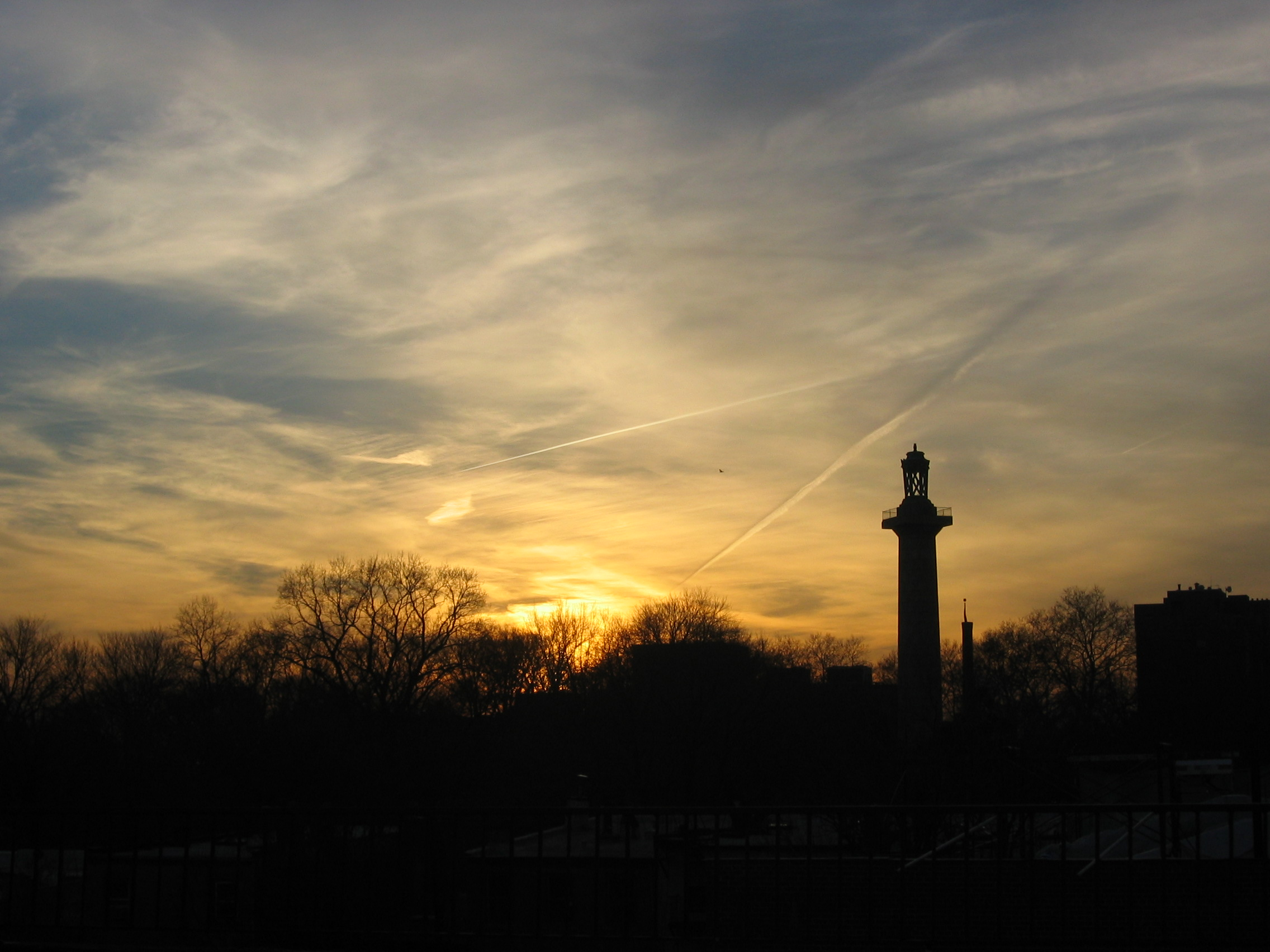
Sunset over the Prison Ship Martyrs' Monument in Fort Greene Park

Perchance there are but few places about more desirable for residences, or more pleasant for our evening walks...(but) on every side filthy shanties are permitted to be erected from which issue all sorts of offensive smells...It is indeed a fact that many of the inmates of these hovels keep swine, cattle, etc. in their cellars and not an unusual circumstance to witness these animals enjoying side by side with their owners the cheering rays of the sun; whilst offal and filth of the assorted family is suffered to collect about their premises and endanger the lives of those in their neighborhood by its sickening and deadly effluvia."

— Letter to the editor, The New York Times, c.1858

Washington Park, renamed Fort Greene Park in 1897, was established as Brooklyn's first park in 1847 on a 30-acre (120,000 m^{2}) plot around the site of the old Fort. In 1864, Frederick Law Olmsted and Calvert Vaux, by now famous for their design of Central Park, were contracted to design the park, and constructed what was described in 1884 as "one of the most central, delightful, and healthful places for recreation that any city can boast." Olmsted and Vaux's elegant design featured flowering chestnut trees along the periphery, open grassy spaces, walking paths, a vine-covered arbor facing a military salute ground, a permanent rostrum for speeches, and two lawns used for croquet and tennis. The park's success prompted the creation of the larger Prospect Park. At the highest point of the park, The Prison Ship Martyrs Monument and vault was erected in 1908 to house the bones of some of the 12,000 Revolutionary soldiers and civilians whose bodies were thrown off British prison ships and later washed ashore. The monument, designed by the firm of McKim, Mead, and White, was the world's largest Doric column at 143 feet (44 m) tall, and housed a bronze urn at its apex. Restoration work on the monument was completed in the late 2000s.

On April 24, 1888, the Fulton Street Elevated began running from Fulton Ferry to Nostrand Avenue, shortening the commute of Fort Greene residents, while also blocking light and adding street noise to residents facing Fulton Street. Elevated lines also ran along Lafayette Avenue and Myrtle Avenue.

=== 20th century ===
Fort Greene in the early 20th century became a significant cultural destination. After the original Brooklyn Academy of Music in Brooklyn Heights burned down in 1903, the current one was built in Fort Greene, and opened in 1908 with a production of Charles Gounod's Faust featuring Enrico Caruso and Geraldine Farrar. At the time, BAM was the most complexly designed cultural center in Greater New York since the construction of Madison Square Garden 15 years earlier. Fort Greene also showcased two stunning movie theaters, built in the 1920s: the Paramount Theater, which was ultimately incorporated into Long Island University's Brooklyn campus; and the Brooklyn Fox Theatre at the intersection of Flatbush Avenue and Fulton Street, which was demolished in 1971. Built from 1927 to 1929, the Williamsburgh Savings Bank Tower, one of Brooklyn's tallest buildings, is located next to the Brooklyn Academy of Music. Brooklyn Technical High School, one of New York's most selective public high schools, began construction on Fort Greene Place in 1930.

The poet Marianne Moore lived and worked for many years in an apartment house on Cumberland Street. Her apartment, which is lovingly recalled in Elizabeth Bishop's essay, "Efforts of Affection", has been preserved exactly as it existed during Moore's lifetime at the Rosenbach Museum & Library in Philadelphia by the Rosenbach brothers, renowned collectors of literary ephemera. Richard Wright wrote Native Son while living on Carlton Avenue in Fort Greene.

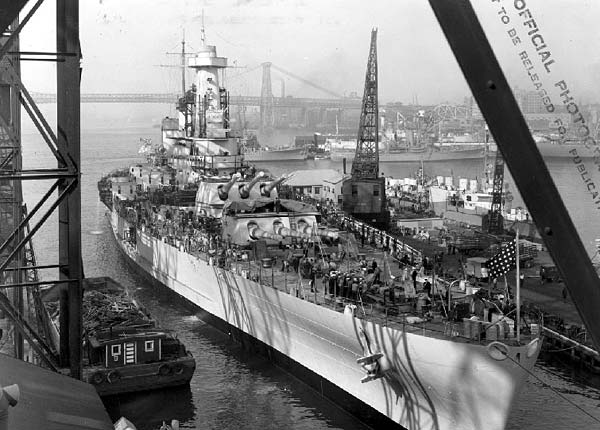
USS North Carolina in the Brooklyn Navy Yard in 1941

During World War II, the Brooklyn Navy Yard employed more than 71,000 people. Due to the resulting demand for housing, the New York City Housing Authority built 35 brick buildings between 1941 and 1944 ranging in height from six to fifteen stories collectively called the Fort Greene Houses. Production at the yard declined significantly after the war and many of the workers either moved on or fell on hard times. In 1957–58, the houses were renovated and divided into the Walt Whitman Houses and the Raymond V. Ingersoll Houses. One year later. Newsweek profiled the housing project as "one of the starkest examples" of the failures of public housing. The article painted a picture of broken windows, cracked walls, flickering or inoperative lighting, and elevators being used as toilets. Further depressing the area was the decommissioning of the Navy Yard in 1966 and dismantling of the Myrtle Avenue elevated train in 1969 which made the area much less attractive to Manhattan commuters.

From the 1960s through the 1980s, Fort Greene fought hard times that came with citywide poverty, crime, and the crack epidemic. While some houses were abandoned, artists, preservationists and Black professionals began to claim and restore the neighborhood in the late 1980s and early 1990s. Herbert Scott Gibson, a resident of the street called Washington Park, organized the Fort Greene Landmarks Preservation Committee which successfully lobbied for the establishment of Historic District status. The New York City Landmarks Preservation Commission designated two districts, the Fort Greene and BAM Historic Districts, in 1978. Spike Lee established his 40 Acres & A Mule Filmworks company in Fort Greene in the mid-1980s, further strengthening the resurgence of the neighborhood. From 1981 to 1997, this resurgence included the South Oxford Tennis Club, which became an important cultural hub. The Fort Greene Historic District was listed on the National Register of Historic Places in 1983 and expanded in 1984. As a historically African-American neighborhood, the cultural revival in the 1980s and 1990s has often been compared to that of the Harlem Renaissance.

=== 21st century ===
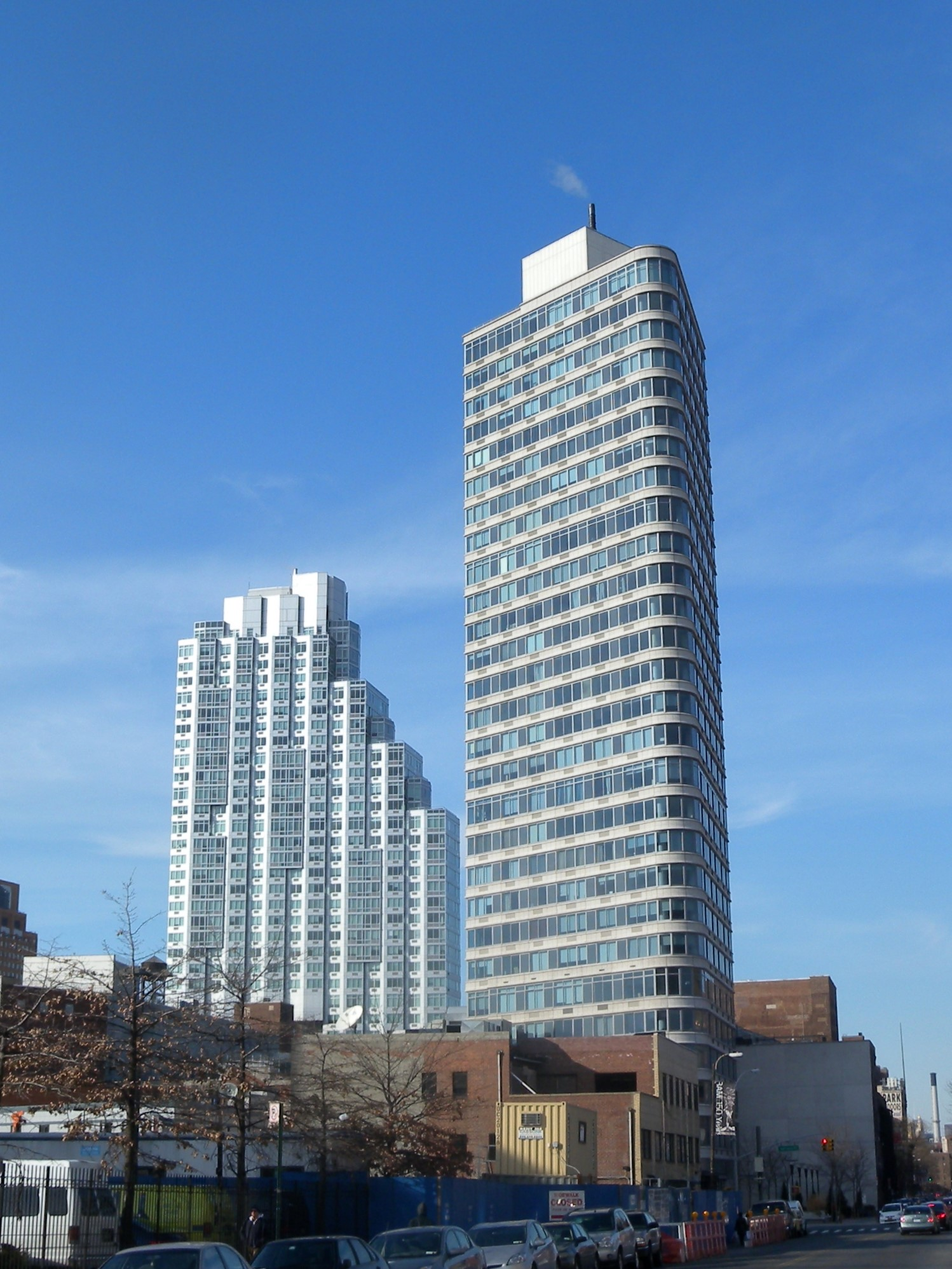
Residential buildings at Ashland Place and Lafayette Street pictured in 2013

The late 1990s and early 2000s saw the influx of many new residents and businesses to Fort Greene. While issues of gentrification are raised with the Black population steeply declining from 41.8% in 2000 to 25.8% in 2017 (according to the Furman Center at New York University), Fort Greene stands to others as one of the best examples of a racially and economically diverse neighborhood. Commentary in The New York Times referred to the neighborhood as having a "prevailing sense of racial amity that intrigues sociologists and attracts middle-class residents from other parts of the city". GQ describes it as "one of the rare racial mucous membranes in the five boroughs—it's getting white-ified but isn't there yet, and so is temporarily integrated".

The controversial Atlantic Yards/Pacific Park project to build an arena (later known as the Barclays Center) for the then-New Jersey Nets (now the Brooklyn Nets) and a complex of large commercial and residential high-rises on the border of Fort Greene and Prospect Heights garnered opposition from many neighborhood residents who formed coalitions.

In 1994 Forest City Ratner promised that the project, which would be funded by taxpayers, would bring 2,250 units of affordable housing, 10,000 jobs, publicly accessible open space, and would stimulate development within ten years. As of 2018, four of the fifteen planned buildings had opened, but the deadline was delayed by about 10 years from 2025 to 2035.

Fort Greene and Clinton Hill was the focus of The Local, a blog produced by The New York Times in collaboration with CUNY Graduate School of Journalism. It relied on community participation with content written by CUNY students and members of the community.

From 2001 to 2011, it was home to a popular bar called Moe's, frequented by journalists, artists, cooks, and people in the entertainment industry. It closed and was replaced by a new bar, controversially called Mo's.

In 2015, a group of anonymous artists illicitly installed a 100-pound bust of Edward Snowden, the National Security Agency leaker, atop one of the four columns at the edge of the Prison Ship Martyrs' Monument in Fort Greene Park, using a permanent adhesive. It was removed the same day by Parks Department personnel.

== Demographics ==
=== 2010 Census Data ===
Based on data from the 2010 United States census, the population of Fort Greene was 26,079, a decrease of 2,256 (8.0%) from the 28,335 counted in 2000. Covering an area of 378.73 acres (153.27 ha), the neighborhood had a population density of 68.9 inhabitants per acre (44,100/sq mi; 17,000/km^{2}).

The racial makeup of the neighborhood was 52% White, 20% African American, 0.3% Native American, 11% Asian, 0.0% Pacific Islander, 0.3% from other races, and 3.3% from two or more races. Hispanic or Latino of any race were 12% of the population. The entirety of Community Board 2, which comprises Fort Greene and Brooklyn Heights, had 117,046 inhabitants as of NYC Health's 2018 Community Health Profile, with an average life expectancy of 80.6 years. This is slightly lower than the median life expectancy of 81.2 for all New York City neighborhoods. Most inhabitants are middle-aged adults and youth: 15% are between the ages of 0–17, 44% between 25 and 44, and 20% between 45 and 64. The ratio of college-aged and elderly residents was lower, at 9% and 12% respectively.

=== 2016 Census Data ===
As of 2016, the median household income in Community Board 2 was $56,599. In 2018, an estimated 22% of Fort Greene and Brooklyn Heights residents lived in poverty, compared to 21% in all of Brooklyn and 20% in all of New York City. One in twelve residents (8%) were unemployed, compared to 9% in the rest of both Brooklyn and New York City. Rent burden, or the percentage of residents who have difficulty paying their rent, is 39% in Fort Greene and Brooklyn Heights, lower than the citywide and borough-wide rates of 52% and 51% respectively. Based on this calculation, as of 2018, Fort Greene and Brooklyn Heights are considered to be high-income relative to the rest of the city and not gentrifying.

=== 2020 Census Data ===
According to the 2020 census data from New York City Department of City Planning, there are between 10,000 and 19,999 White residents, and the Hispanic, Black and Asian populations are each between 5,000 and 9,999 residents. Some news articles from the mid-2010s to 2021 have spoken about the significant growing Asian population, especially the Chinese speaking population and most particularly in the affordable NYCHA housing developments of Walt Whitman Houses and Ingersoll Houses.

== Boundaries ==
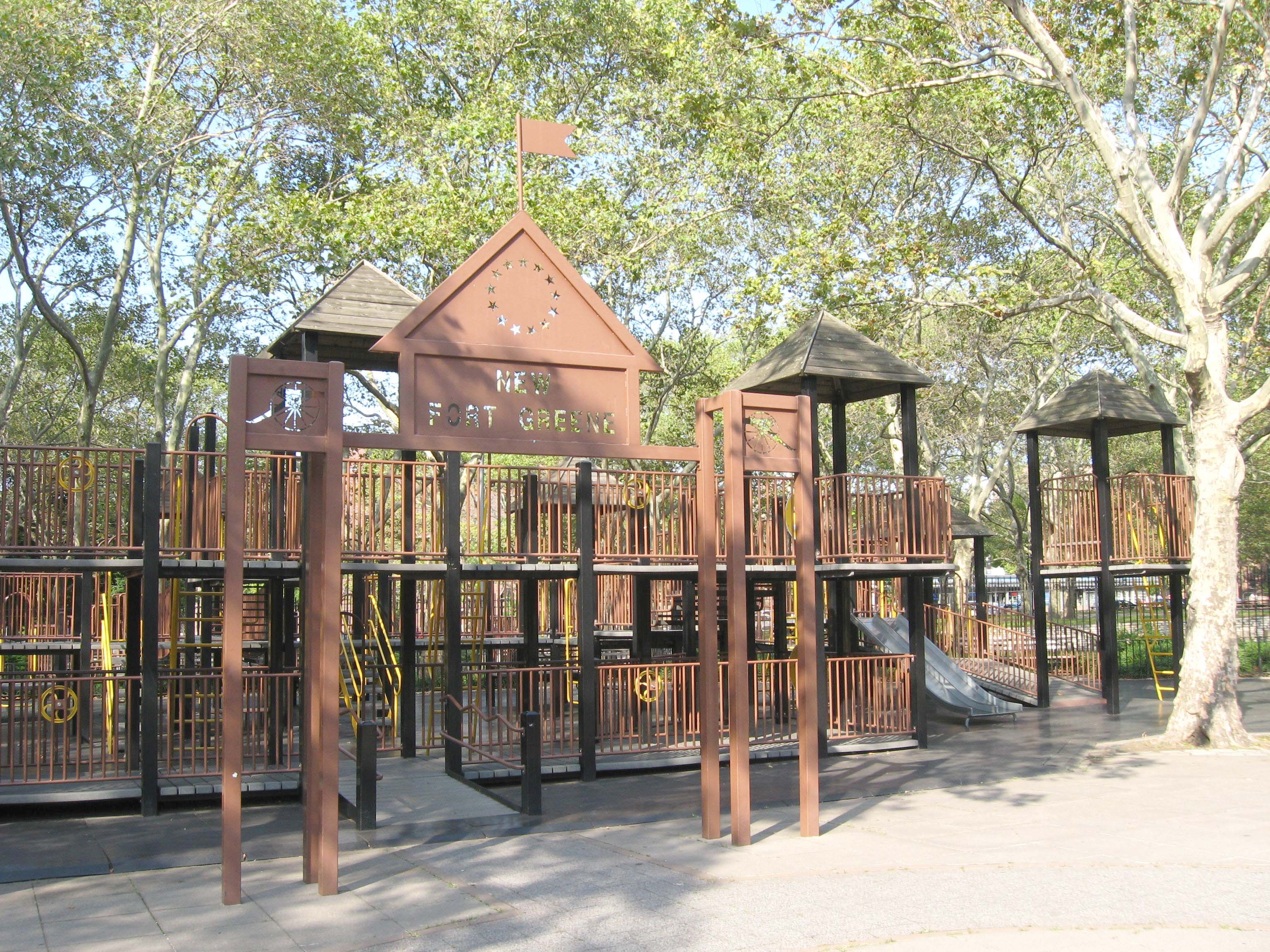
Fort Greene Park playground in 2008

Although there are no official neighborhood boundaries in New York City, Fort Greene is roughly bounded by Flushing Avenue to the north, Flatbush Avenue to the west, Vanderbilt Avenue to the east, and Atlantic Avenue to the south. Its main arteries are Fulton Street, Lafayette Avenue, and DeKalb Avenue, and the Brooklyn–Queens Expressway (Interstate 278) passes through the neighborhood's northern edge. A 2015 survey by DNAinfo found that local residents disagreed over the neighborhood's precise boundaries; more recent residents were more likely to push the northern boundary south toward Myrtle Avenue and the eastern boundary east toward Classon Avenue.

== Police and crime ==
Fort Greene is patrolled by the 88th Precinct of the NYPD, located at 298 Classon Avenue. A second precinct building, the 84th Precinct at 301 Gold Street, is physically located in Fort Greene but does not serve the neighborhood.

The 88th Precinct ranked 64th safest out of 69 patrol areas for per-capita crime in 2010. This was attributed to a high rate of crimes relative to its low population, especially in the public housing developments in Fort Greene. As of 2018, with a non-fatal assault rate of 40 per 100,000 people, Fort Greene and Brooklyn Heights' rate of violent crimes per capita is less than that of the city as a whole. The incarceration rate of 401 per 100,000 people is lower than that of the city as a whole.

The 88th Precinct has a lower crime rate than in the 1990s, with crimes across all categories having decreased by 82.9% between 1990 and 2018. The precinct reported 1 murder, 12 rapes, 100 robberies, 181 felony assaults, 101 burglaries, 402 grand larcenies, and 48 grand larcenies auto in 2018.

== Fire safety ==
Fort Greene is served by two New York City Fire Department (FDNY) fire stations. Engine Co. 207/Ladder Co. 110/Satellite 6/Battalion 31/Division 11 is located at 172 Tillary Street, serving the western part of the neighborhood, while Engine Co. 210 is located at 160 Carlton Avenue, serving the eastern part of the neighborhood.

== Health ==
As of 2018, preterm births and births to teenage mothers are less common in Fort Greene and Brooklyn Heights than in other places citywide. In Fort Greene and Brooklyn Heights, there were 74 preterm births per 1,000 live births (compared to 87 per 1,000 citywide), and 11.6 births to teenage mothers per 1,000 live births (compared to 19.3 per 1,000 citywide). Fort Greene and Brooklyn Heights have a relatively low population of residents who are uninsured, or who receive healthcare through Medicaid. In 2018, this population of uninsured residents was estimated to be 4%, which is lower than the citywide rate of 12%. However, this estimate was based on a small sample size.

The concentration of fine particulate matter, the deadliest type of air pollutant, in Fort Greene and Brooklyn Heights is 0.0088 milligrams per cubic metre (8.8×10^{−9} oz/ft^{3}), lower than the citywide and boroughwide averages. Eleven percent of Fort Greene and Brooklyn Heights residents are smokers, which is slightly lower than the city average of 14% of residents being smokers. In Fort Greene and Brooklyn Heights, 24% of residents are obese, 6% are diabetic, and 25% have high blood pressure—compared to the citywide averages of 24%, 11%, and 28% respectively. In addition, 14% of children are obese, compared to the citywide average of 20%.

Eighty-eight percent of residents eat some fruits and vegetables every day, which is slightly higher than the city's average of 87%. In 2018, 86% of residents described their health as "good", "very good", or "excellent", more than the city's average of 78%. For every supermarket in Fort Greene and Brooklyn Heights, there are 12 bodegas.

== Post offices and ZIP Codes ==
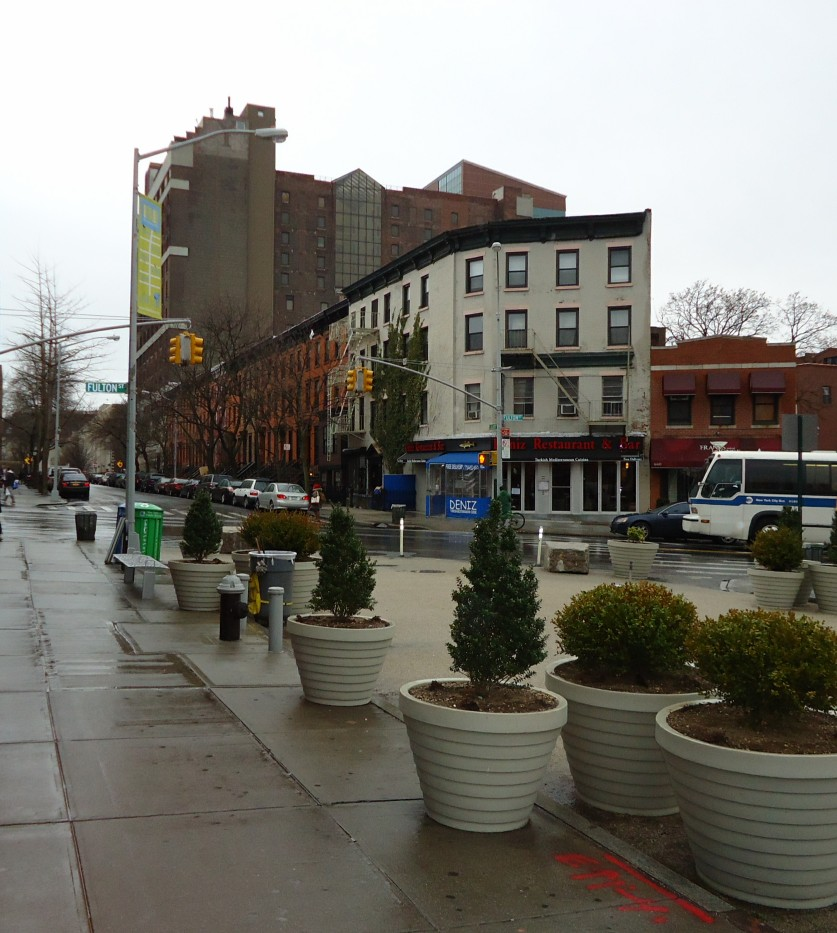
Streetscape near Fulton Street

Fort Greene is covered by ZIP Codes 11201, 11205, 11217, and 11238, which respectively cover the northwest, northeast, southwest, and southeast parts of the neighborhood. The United States Post Office operates three locations nearby: the Times Plaza Station at 539 Atlantic Avenue, the Times Plaza Annex at 594 Dean Street, and the Adelphi Station at 950 Fulton Street.

== Education ==
Fort Greene and Brooklyn Heights generally have a higher ratio of college-educated residents than the rest of the city as of 2018. The majority of residents (64%) have a college education or higher, while 11% have less than a high school education and 25% are high school graduates or have some college education. By contrast, 40% of Brooklynites and 38% of city residents have a college education or higher. The percentage of Fort Greene and Brooklyn Heights students excelling in math rose from 27 percent in 2000 to 50 percent in 2011, and reading achievement rose from 34% to 41% during the same time period.

Fort Greene and Brooklyn Heights' rate of elementary school student absenteeism is about equal to the rest of New York City. In Fort Greene and Brooklyn Heights, 20% of elementary school students missed twenty or more days per school year, the same as the citywide average. Additionally, 75% of high school students in Fort Greene and Brooklyn Heights graduate on time, equal to the citywide average.

=== Educational and cultural institutions ===
Fort Greene is home to Brooklyn Technical High School, one of New York City's most competitive public schools, and Bishop Loughlin Memorial High School. Success Academy Charter Schools opened Success Academy Fort Greene in 2013 as an elementary school. There are two public elementary schools serving the area: PS 20, which also serves Clinton Hill, and The Urban Academy of Arts and Letters, open to all students in school district 13.

The prestigious Pratt Institute is in neighboring Clinton Hill.

Fort Greene is also home to the Brooklyn Academy of Music, the Brooklyn Music School, The Museum of Contemporary African Diasporan Arts, BRIC Arts, UrbanGlass, 651 ARTS performing center for African-American presenters, The Irondale Center for Theater, Education, and Outreach, the Mark Morris Dance Center and Lafayette Church.

=== Library ===
The Brooklyn Public Library (BPL)'s Walt Whitman branch is located at 93 Saint Edwards Street. The current Carnegie library structure opened in 1908, though a library had existed in Fort Greene since 1900.

== Transportation ==
The neighborhood is served by the New York City Subway at DeKalb Avenue (B, D, N, Q, R, and W trains), Atlantic Avenue–Barclays Center (2, 3, 4, 5, B, D, N, Q, R and W trains), Lafayette Avenue (A and C trains), and Fulton Street (G train). The LIRR's Atlantic Terminal station is also here, and the neighborhood is also served by the B25, B26, B38, B45, B52, B54, B57 and B62 bus routes.

Fort Greene is served by NYC Ferry's Astoria route, which stops at the Brooklyn Navy Yard. The Brooklyn Navy Yard stop opened on May 20, 2019.

There are plans to build the Brooklyn–Queens Connector (BQX), a light rail system that would run along the waterfront from Red Hook through Fort Greene to Astoria in Queens. However, the system is projected to cost $2.7 billion, and the projected opening has been delayed until at least 2029.

== Notable residents ==
=== Politicians and political activists ===
- Letitia James (born 1958), Attorney General of New York
- Hakeem Jeffries (born 1970), U.S. representative for New York's 8th congressional district
- Velmanette Montgomery (born 1942), State Senator
- Walter T. Mosley (born 1967), Assemblyman
- Eli Pariser (born 1980), activist and co-founder of MoveOn.org, Avaaz.org, and CEO of Upworthy
- Zephyr Teachout (born 1971), associate law professor at Fordham University and 2014 Democratic gubernatorial candidate
- Conrad Tillard (born 1964), politician, Baptist minister, radio host, author, and civil rights activist

=== Writers ===
- Helen Adam (1909–1993), Scottish poet, collagist and photographer
- Gwendolyn B. Bennett (1903–1981), Harlem Renaissance writer and artist
- Sarah Benson (born 1977/78), director of avant-garde theatre productions
- Uli Beutter Cohen, documentarian
- Truman Capote (1924–1984), novelist
- Colin Channer (born 1963), novelist
- Jennifer Egan (born 1962), novelist
- Sasha Frere-Jones (born 1967), writer and former music critic for The New Yorker
- Nelson George (born 1957), music journalist and novelist
- Amitav Ghosh, novelist
- Clara Whitehill Hunt (1871–1958), children's novelist
- David Henry Hwang, playwright
- Jhumpa Lahiri, novelist
- Karan Mahajan, novelist
- Marianne Moore, poet who lived at 260 Cumberland Street from 1929 to 1966. Moore worshiped at the Lafayette Avenue Presbyterian Church and fought to save the boathouse and camperdown elm in Prospect Park.
- Carl Hancock Rux, novelist, poet, playwright, and recording artist
- John Steinbeck, novelist
- Adario Strange, writer-filmmaker
- Touré, novelist, music journalist and TV host
- Adelle Waldman (born 1977), novelist, columnist and blogger
- Michael Weller (born 1942), playwright
- Colson Whitehead (born 1969), novelist, lived in the area early in his career
- Walt Whitman, poet who was influential in the creation of Fort Greene Park in 1843
- Richard Wright (1908–1960), novelist, wrote Native Son while living at 175 Carlton Avenue

=== Artists ===
==== Photographers and visual artists ====
- Ernest Crichlow (1914–2005), social realist artist
- Kyle DeWoody (born 1984/85), gallery owner and curator
- Akiko Ichikawa, artist and activist
- Gertrude Käsebier (1852–1934), photographer
- Robert Mapplethorpe (1946–1989), photographer
- Chris Ofili, artist
- José Parlá, artist
- David Salle, painter
- Ken Schles (born 1960), photographer.
- Lorna Simpson, photographer
- Mickalene Thomas, visual artist
- Kara Walker, visual artist
- Carrie Mae Weems, photographer
- Robert Wilson, artist and theater director

==== Musicians ====
- Erykah Badu, musician
- Gary Bartz, musician
- Lester Bowie (1941–1999), musician
- Betty Carter, musician
- Steve Coleman, musician
- Carla Cook, musician
- Dana Dane, musician
- Slide Hampton, musician
- John Wesley Harding, singer
- El-P, underground hip-hop artist and founder of Definitive Jux Records; his album "I'll Sleep When You're Dead" was recorded at his residence in Fort Greene
- Ol' Dirty Bastard, rapper (deceased), grew up in Fort Greene
- Digable Planets, hip-hop group
- Free Murda, rapper, cousin of ODB and RZA
- Popa Wu, patriarch of the Wu-Tang Clan
- Just-Ice, rapper
- Lisa Fischer, musician, born in Fort Greene
- Mary Halvorson, guitarist
- Talib Kweli, rapper
- Vernon Reid, musician of Living Colour
- Chubb Rock, rapper
- Justine Skye, singer
- Patti Smith, musician, now lives in the Rockaways
- Cecil Taylor (1929–2018), jazz musician
- Johnny Temple, musician with the bands Soulside and Girls Against Boys
- Citizen Cope, musician
- Bill Lee, musician and father of Spike Lee; Rented rooms on Carlton Avenue to musicians Eric Dolphy, Freddie Hubbard, Wes Montgomery, and Wayne Shorter.
- Branford Marsalis, musician
- Toshi Reagon, musician
- Rev. Hezekiah Walker, musician
- Mos Def, actor, rapper
- John Flansburgh and John Linnell of the band They Might Be Giants
- Jalal Mansur Nuriddin, founding member of The Last Poets

=== TV and movie industry ===
==== Directors, producers, choreographers ====
- Alan Ball (born 1957), screenwriter and producer; creator and writer of Six Feet Under and True Blood
- Ernest Dickerson, film director and cinematographer
- Lee Hirsch, documentary filmmaker; writer-director of Amandla!: A Revolution in Four-Part Harmony (2002) and Bully (2011)
- Spike Lee, film director; lives now in Harlem but maintains his movie studio 40 Acres & A Mule Filmworks there, and several of his films, including She's Gotta Have It, and She Hate Me were partially shot in Fort Greene.
- Sonya Tayeh, (born 1977/78) choreographer
- Robert Verdi (born 1968), fashion stylist

==== Actors and performers ====
- Uzo Aduba (born 1981), Golden-Globe-winning star of Netflix's Orange Is the New Black
- Wyatt Cenac (born 1976), comedian, actor, producer and Emmy Award winning writer, who hosts and produces the HBO series Wyatt Cenac's Problem Areas
- Adrian Grenier (born 1976), actor who now lives in Clinton Hill
- Gaby Hoffmann (born 1982), actress best known for her roles in Sleepless in Seattle, Transparent and Girls
- Holly Hunter (born 1958), actress
- Kyle Jean-Baptiste (1993–2015), actor
- Denis O'Hare (born 1962), actor
- Rosie Perez (born 1964), The View host and Academy Award-nominated actor.
- Christina Ricci (born 1980), actress.
- Chris Rock, now lives in Alpine, New Jersey
- Keri Russell
- Roger Guenveur Smith (born 1955), actor, director and writer
- Alek Wek
- Saul Williams, singer, musician, poet, writer, and actor (now lives in Paris)
- Jeffrey Wright

=== Athletes ===
- Taj Gibson (born 1985), NBA player
- Ronald Holmberg (born 1938), ranked World No. 7 in tennis 1960 and in the U.S. Top 10 for nine years.
- Michael Jordan (born 1963), entrepreneur, owner/chairman of the Charlotte Hornets, and former NBA player
- Albert King (born 1959), former NBA player and younger brother of Bernard King
- Bernard King (born 1956), former NBA player
- Lia Neal (born 1995), 2012 US Olympic bronze-winning swimmer
- Mike Tyson (born 1966), professional boxer who was undisputed heavyweight champion from 1987 to 1990.

=== Criminals ===
- Al Capone, born in Fort Greene
- Nicky Cruz, former leader of a notorious New York City gang, The Mau-Maus; later became a Christian evangelist
- Kelvin Martin, an infamous robbery expert and criminal also known as the original 50 Cent

=== Other notables ===
- Brigadier General (Brevet) Edward Brush Fowler, American Civil War. Commander, 14th Regiment, also known as the 14th Brooklyn, nicknamed the Red Legged Devils at the First Battle of Bull Run; for whom Fowler Square is named
- Georgianna Glose, Dominican religious sister and founder/director of the Fort Greene Strategic Neighborhood Action Partnership
- William Quan Judge, mystic, esotericist, and occultist, and one of the founders of the original Theosophical Society
- Dr. Susan McKinney Steward, first African American woman to receive a medical degree in New York State and the third in the U.S.
