= Ezequiel Melillo =

Ezequiel Melillo may refer to:

- Ezequiel Melillo (footballer, born 1990), Argentine midfielder
- Ezequiel Melillo (footballer, born 1993), Argentine midfielder
