= Young at Heart (1995 film) =

1995 American television film

- Genre: Comedy; Drama
- Written by: Judith Paige Mitchell
- Directed by: Allan Arkush
- Starring: Olympia Dukakis; Chelsea Altman; Yannick Bisson; Philip Bosco
- Music by: Mason Daring
- Country of origin: United States
- Original language: English

Production
- Producers: Ian Sander; Tina Sinatra; Paula Weinstein
- Cinematography: Alar Kivilo
- Editor: Tammis Chandler
- Production companies: TS Productions; Warner Bros. Television

Original release
- Network: CBS
- Release: March 12, 1995

Young at Heart is a 1995 American television film directed by Allan Arkush and starring Chelsea Altman, Yannick Bisson, and Philip Bosco. Frank Sinatra appears as himself in his final screen performance. It is also Sinatra's final role before his death.

== Plot ==
After discovering that her deceased husband lost the family's bar and home to a gambling debt, a woman takes on the mobsters who threaten all she holds dear.

== Cast ==
- Olympia Dukakis as Rose Garaventi
- Joe Penny as Michael "Mike" Garaventi
- Louis Zorich as Joe Garaventi
- Yannick Bisson as Joey Garaventi
- Philip Bosco as Patsy
- Joseph Griffin as J.J.
- Chelsea Altman as Gina
- Frank Sinatra as Himself

== Production ==
The film was shot in Toronto, staged as Hoboken, New Jersey.

== Reception ==
Todd Everett of Variety praised the performance by Dukakis and wrote that "impressive perfs are given by Penny, Landers, Bosco and virtually all of the supporting players."

Lynne Heffley of the Los Angeles Times called it a "contrived Olympia Dukakis vehicle" that is nevertheless "a guilty pleasure."
