= Milillo =

Milillo is a surname. Notable people with this surname include:

- Alessio Milillo (born 1997), Italian football player
- José Milillo (born 1961), Venezuelan football player
- Ricardo Milillo (born 1969), Venezuelan football player
- Valeria Milillo (born 1966), Italian actress
- Vincenzo Milillo (born 1966), Italian politician in Legislature I of Italy, et al.

== See also ==
- Melillo
