= Brooklyn Academy of Music =

Arts venue in Brooklyn, New York

- BAM
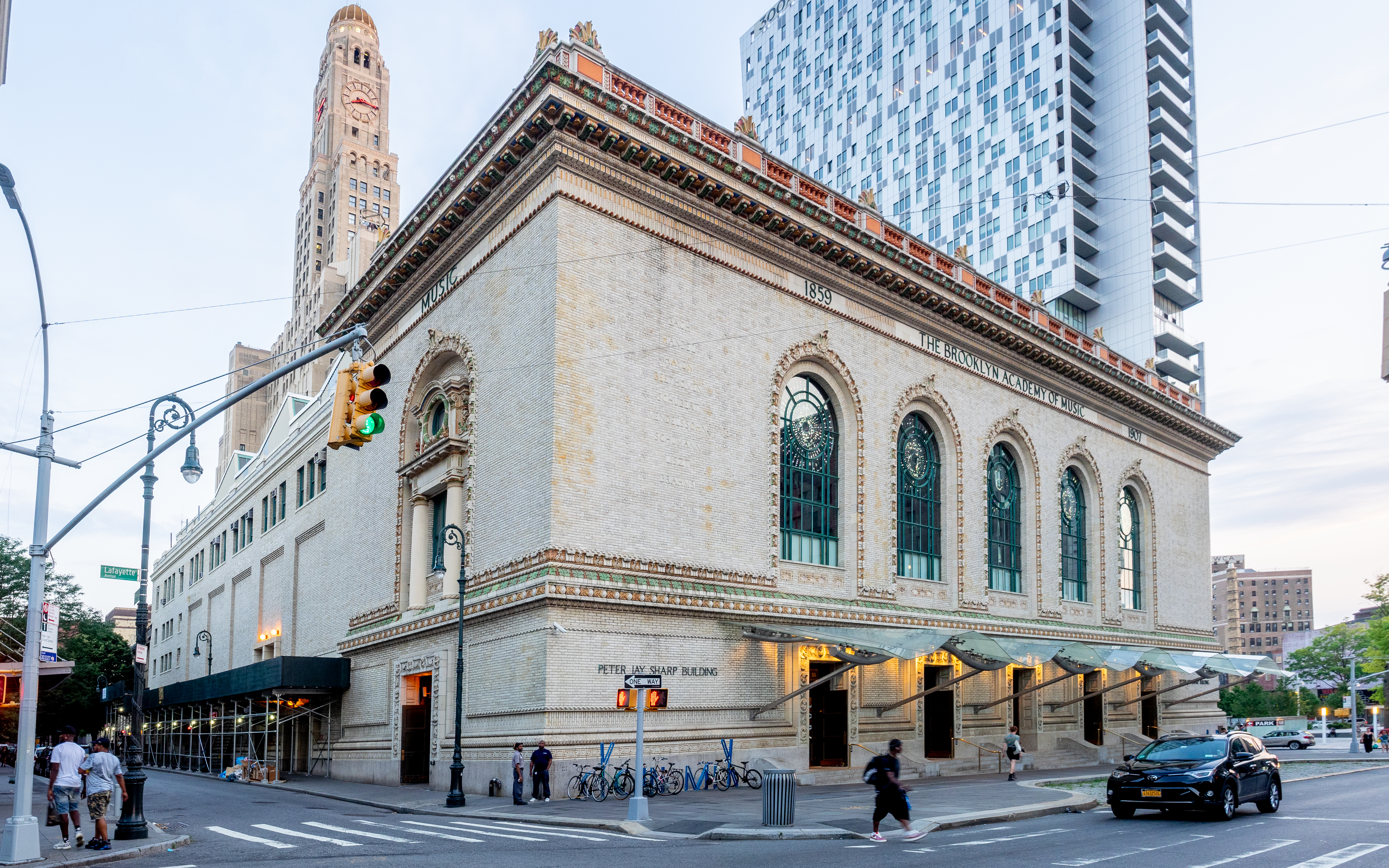
- BAM Peter Jay Sharp Building (2019)
- Interactive map of Brooklyn Academy of Music
- Address: 30 Lafayette Avenue (Peter Jay Sharp); 651 Fulton Street (BAM Strong); 321 Ashland Place (Fisher)
- Location: Brooklyn, New York
- Capacity: Howard Gilman Opera House: 2,109; Harvey Theater: 874; Lepercq Space: 350; Fishman Space: 250; Total: 3,583
- Type: Performing arts center
- Public transit: Long Island Rail Road: Atlantic Branch at Atlantic Terminal; New York City Subway: at Atlantic Avenue–Barclays Center at Fulton Street at Lafayette Avenue; New York City Bus: B25, B26, B38, B41, B45, B52, B67

Construction
- Built: 1908
- Opened: 1908

Website
- bam.org
- Brooklyn Academy of Music
- U.S. National Register of Historic Places
- New York State Register of Historic Places
- Location: 30 Lafayette Ave., Brooklyn, New York
- Coordinates: 40°41′11″N 73°58′41″W
- Area: less than one acre
- Built: 1907
- Architects: Herts & Tallant
- Architectural style: Renaissance
- NRHP reference No.: 06000251
- NYSRHP No.: 04701.000159

Significant dates
- Added to NRHP: May 2, 2006
- Designated NYSRHP: December 14, 2005

The Brooklyn Academy of Music (BAM) is a multi-arts center in Brooklyn, New York City. It hosts avant-garde and contemporary performances, with theater, dance, music, opera, film programming across multiple nearby venues.

BAM was chartered in 1859, presented its first show in 1861, and began operations in its present location in Fort Greene, Brooklyn, in 1908. The Academy is incorporated as a New York State not-for-profit corporation. It has 501(c)(3) status.

== History ==
=== Early history (1858–1903) ===
On October 21, 1858, a meeting was held at the Polytechnic Institute to measure support for establishing "a hall adapted to Musical, Literary, Scientific and other occasional purposes, of sufficient size to meet the requirements of our large population and worth in style and appearance of our city." The group applied to the New York State Legislature for a charter in the name of Brooklyn Academy of Music. The New York Legislature passed the bill to incorporate the Brooklyn Academy of Music on February 16, 1859. The group raised $60,000 by November 22 and another $90,000 by March 16, 1859. The Brooklyn Academy of Music opened on January 15, 1861.

At the inaugural address on the opening, the management announced that no dramatic performance should ever be held within its walls. The first concert opened with the overture to Der Freischütz, followed by arias and excerpts from various operas, including the William Tell Overture which opened part 2 of the concert.

Founded in 1861, the first BAM facility at 176–194 Montague Street in Brooklyn Heights was conceived as the home of the Philharmonic Society of Brooklyn. The building, designed by architect Leopold Eidlitz, housed a large theater seating 2,109, a smaller concert hall, dressing and chorus rooms, and a vast "baronial" kitchen. BAM presented amateur and professional music and theater productions, including performers such as Ellen Terry, Edwin Booth, and Fritz Kreisler. On her lecture tour of the United States in 1889–1890, Egyptologist and founder of the Egypt Exploration Society Amelia Edwards gave her first and last lectures here, in November and March, respectively.

=== Move to Fort Greene (1903–1950s) ===
After the building burned to the ground on November 30, 1903, BAM made plans to relocate to a new facility in Fort Greene, Brooklyn. Herts & Tallant designed the new building. The cornerstone was laid at 30 Lafayette Avenue on May 25, 1907.

A series of opening events were held in November 1908; the first opera to be staged there was the Metropolitan Opera production of Faust. The noted operatic tenor Enrico Caruso was appearing in a Metropolitan Opera production of L'elisir d'amore at the academy on December 11, 1920, when he experienced a throat hemorrhage and the performance was cancelled. Nearly two weeks later, Caruso sang the final performance of his career at the Met and he died the following year, aged only 48. During the early 1900s, the academy was also used for religious services, when Charles Taze Russell, founder of the bible students movement (now Jehovah's Witnesses and International Bible Students Association), gave sermons there.

=== 1960s–1990s ===
The Waltann School of Creative Arts (WSCA), founded in 1959, located at 1078 Park Place, Brooklyn, was a BAM venue during the 1960s and 1970s. One of the dance teachers there was African American contemporary dancer Carole Johnson, and the Eleo Pomare Dance Company performed there in 1967.

In 1967, Harvey Lichtenstein was appointed executive director and during his 32 years in that role, BAM experienced a turnaround, attracting audiences with new programming and establishing an endowment. BAM established a shuttle bus service to Manhattan, the BAMbus, which ran from 1968. BAM began hosting the annual Next Wave Festival in 1983, featuring performances by international and American artists.

The Chelsea Theater Center was in residence from 1967 to 1977. The Harvey Theater was completed in 1987.

=== 21st century ===
From 1999 to 2015, Karen Brooks Hopkins was president, and Joseph V. Melillo was executive producer through 2018. 30 Lafayette Avenue's facade was restored for $8.6 million in 2004. Due to low ridership and increasing expenses, the BAMbus service was discontinued in 2013.

In 2012, BAM opened its Richard B. Fisher Building, which includes a 250-seat experimental theater. A regular event at the time was BAMcinemaFest, a festival focusing on independent films. Katy Clark was president from 2015 and left the institution in 2021. The BAM Strong complex opened in October 2019, and a renovation of the Harvey Theater was finished at that time. The COVID-19 pandemic severely impacted BAM's finances. BAM KBH, which includes a black box theater and an archives space, opened in early 2025. The New York Times wrote the same year that, while many of BAM's previous executives (including Melillo and Hopkins) had worked there for several decades, their successors had left after only a few years.

Gina Duncan served as president from 2022–2025. David Binder served as artistic director from 2019–2023. Amy Cassello served as interim artistic director from 2023–2024 until she was announced as artistic director in 2024. Since 2026, Tamara McCaw has been BAM's president.

In the 21st century, BAM continued to host prominent theatrical productions, including stagings of Macbeth starring Patrick Stewart (2008), A Streetcar Named Desire starring Cate Blanchett (2009) and Paul Mescal (2024), Diary of a Madman with Geoffrey Rush (2011), King Lear with Frank Langella (2014), Richard II and Henry V with David Tennant (2016), The Judas Kiss with Rupert Everett (2016), Medea with Bobby Cannavale and Rose Byrne (2020), Cyrano de Bergerac with James McAvoy (2022), and The Sign in Sidney Brustein's Window (2023) with Oscar Isaac and Rachel Brosnahan.

== Venues ==
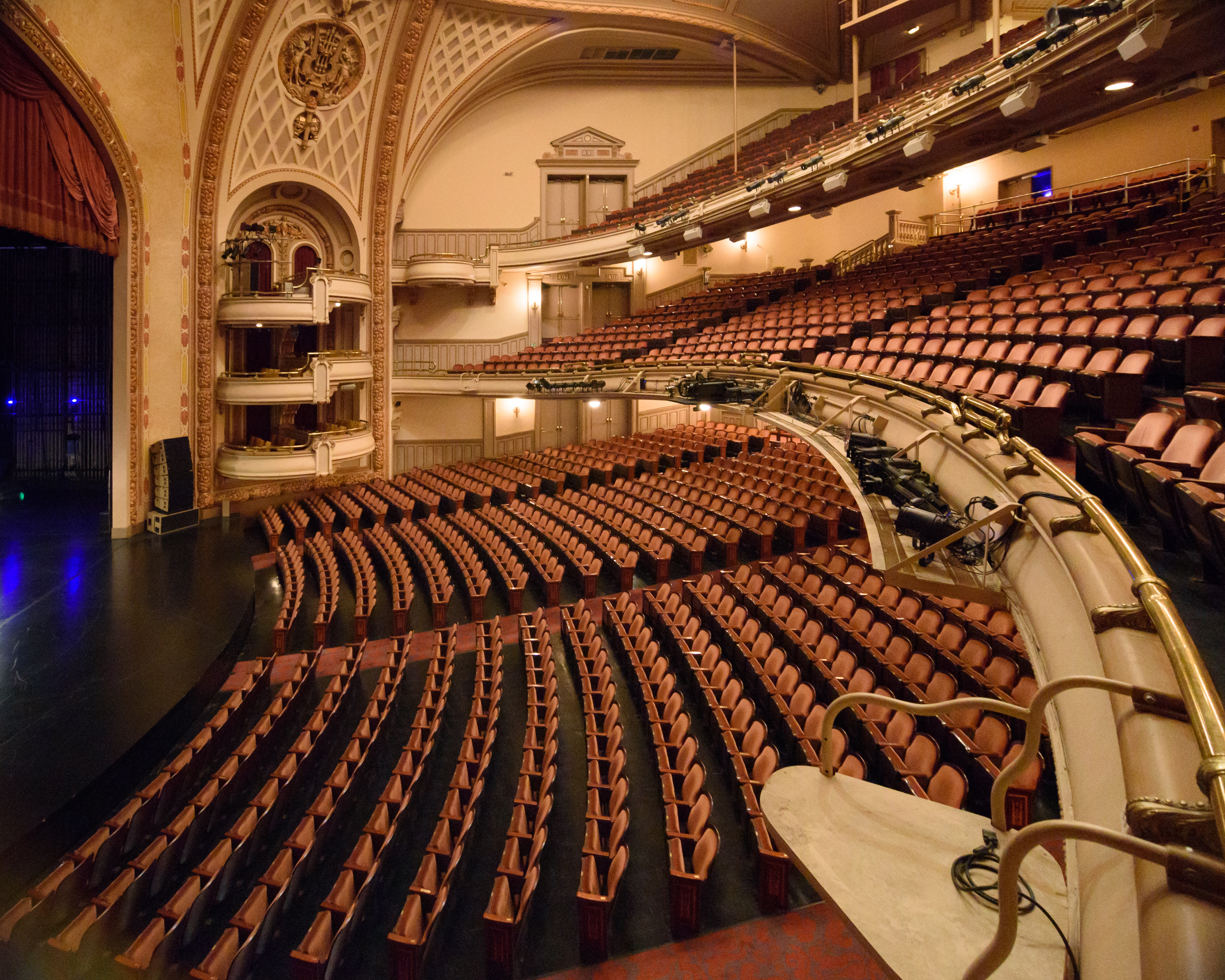
Howard Gilman Opera House

The Peter Jay Sharp Building in the Fort Greene Historic District houses the Howard Gilman Opera House and the BAM Rose Cinemas (formerly the Carey Playhouse). It was designed by the firm Herts & Tallant in 1908, in the renaissance revival style. It is a U-shaped building with an open court in the center of the lot between two theater wings above the first story. The building has a high base of gray granite, with cream colored brick trimmed in terracotta with some marble detail above. The Howard Gilman Opera House has 2,109 seats and BAM Rose Cinemas, which opened in 1998, comprises four screens, and primarily shows first-run, independent and repertory films and series.

Also within the Peter Jay Sharp Building is the Lepercq Space, originally a ballroom and now a flexible event space which houses the BAMcafé, and the Hillman Attic Studio, a flexible rehearsal/performing space.

The BAM Strong, an array of spaces, includes the 874-seat BAM Harvey Theater at 651 Fulton Street. Formerly known as the Majestic Theater, it was built in 1904 with 1,708 seats and eventually showed vaudeville and then feature films, and was named in Lichtenstein's honor in 1999. A renovation by architect Hugh Hardy left the interior paint faded, with often exposed masonry, giving the theater a unique feel of a "modern ruin". In April 2014, CNN named the BAM Harvey as one of the "15 of the World's Most Spectacular Theaters". The complex also features a dedicated art gallery.

The BAM Fisher Building, opened in 2012, contains Fishman Space, a 250-seat black box theater, and Fisher Hillman Studio, a flexible rehearsal and performance space, as well as administrative offices. The BAM Hamm Archives are located in BAM KBH inside of the L10 Arts and Cultural Center at 300 Ashland Place, and the Shelby White & Leon Levy BAM Digital Archive is available online.

The BAM Sharp and Fisher Buildings are located within the Brooklyn Academy of Music Historic District created by the New York City Landmarks Preservation Commission in 1978; the BAM Strong is not. BAM is adjacent to downtown Brooklyn, near Atlantic Terminal, the Barclays Center arena, and the Williamsburgh Savings Bank Tower (once the tallest building in Brooklyn). BAM is part of the Brooklyn Cultural District.

== See also ==
- List of museums and cultural institutions in New York City
