= Alberto Melillo =

Italian painter

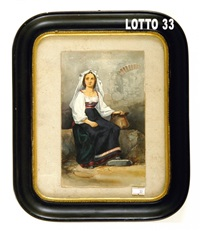
Alberto Melillo

Alberto Melillo (April 1, 1866 – 1915) was an Italian painter.

He completed his studies under Domenico Morelli and Vincenzo Marinelli in his native Naples. Among his works is Guapperello, a half-figure displayed at the Promotrice of Genoa. To the 1888 Italian Exhibition at London, he sent Il racconto della nonna, Il pasto ai polli, Un paesaggio, and two pastel head portraits. He also exhibited some artistic maiolica, for which he earned a diploma of honor. At the Promotrice of Naples, he displayed a pastel of a peasant woman, life size.
