= Fort Greene Historic District =

Historic district in Brooklyn, New York

- U.S. National Register of Historic Places
- U.S. Historic district
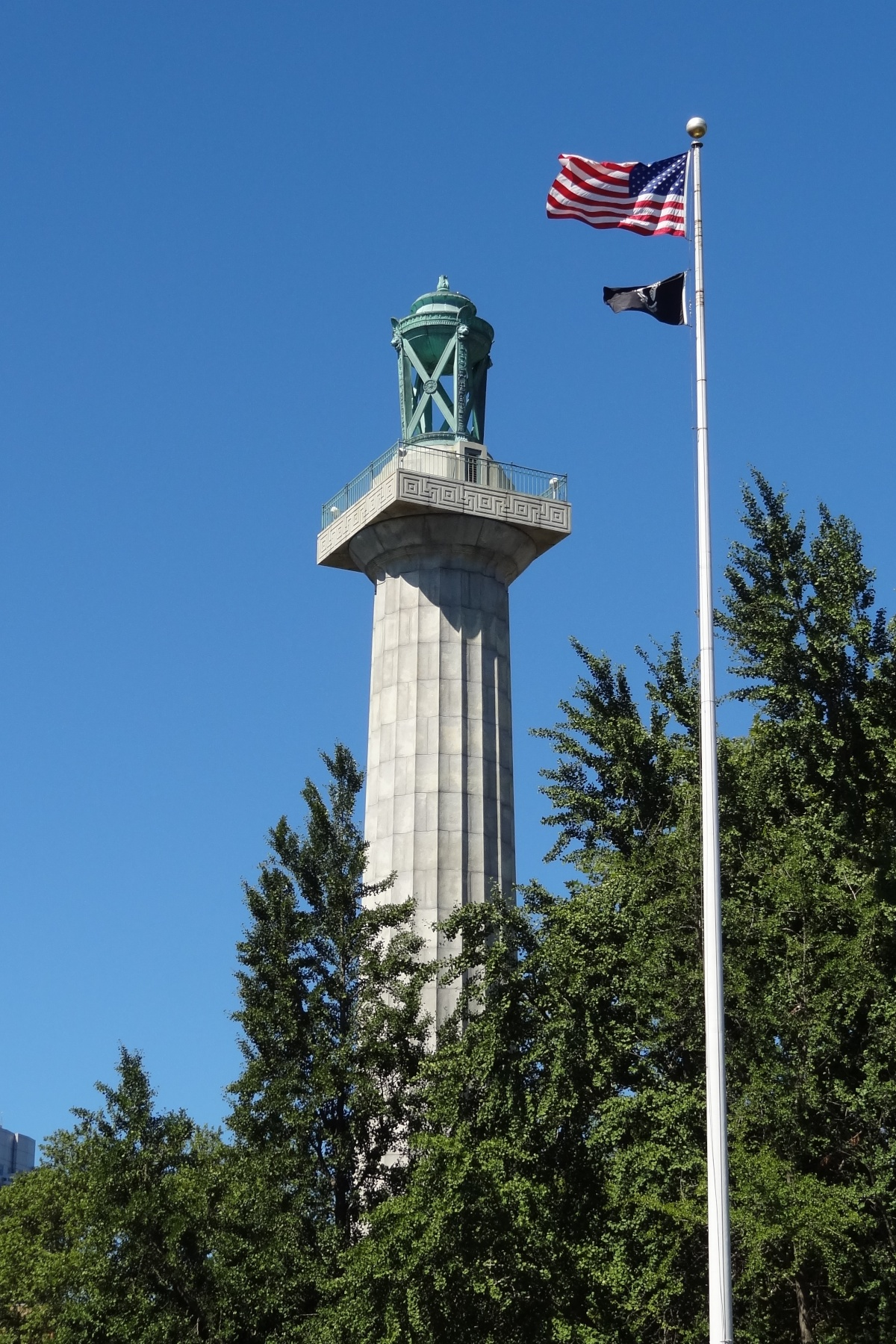
- Prison Ship Martyrs' Monument

- Location within New York City Location within New York Location within the United States
- Location: Roughly bounded by Ft. Greene Pl., Fulton St., Vanderbilt and Myrtle Aves., New York, New York
- Coordinates: 40°41′19″N 73°58′19″W
- Area: 105 acres (42.5 ha)
- Built: 1840
- Architect: Multiple
- Architectural style: Mixed (more Than 2 Styles From Different Periods), Italianate
- NRHP reference No.: 83001691
- Fort Greene Historic District (Boundary Increase)
- U.S. National Register of Historic Places
- U.S. Historic district
- Location: Roughly bounded by Ashland Pl., DeKalb Ave., Hanson Pl., and Oxford St., Adelphi St., Vanderbilt and Myrtle Aves., New York, New York
- Area: 137 acres (55.4 ha)
- Built: 1850
- Architect: Multiple
- Architectural style: Second Empire, Italianate, Anglo-Italianate
- NRHP reference No.: 84002451
- Added to NRHP: September 7, 1984
- Added to NRHP: September 26, 1983

Fort Greene Historic District is a national historic district in Fort Greene, Brooklyn, New York, New York. It consists of 1,158 contributing buildings, two contributing sites, one contributing object, and two contributing structures. It is characterized by a concentration of architecturally distinguished three and four story townhouses developed speculatively and built between 1840 and 1890. Most are faced in sandstone and exhibit characteristics of the Greek Revival, Italianate, Second Empire, and Neo-Grec styles. It includes the 33-acre Fort Greene Park designed by Frederick Law Olmsted and Calvert Vaux in 1868. In the park is a column memorializing Revolutionary War soldiers (Prison Ship Martyrs' Monument) that was designed by McKim, Mead, and White and erected in 1908. The park was built on the site of fortifications built in 1776 and 1814. Also located in the district is the Brooklyn Academy of Music.

It was listed on the National Register of Historic Places in 1983 and expanded in 1984.
