= Joseph V. Melillo =

Joseph V. Melillo was executive producer at Brooklyn Academy of Music (BAM) from 1999 to 2018, and was named executive producer emeritus when he left the post. He is Columbia Artists Management's international artistic advisor, and was a 2019 Director’s Fellow at the Center for Ballet and the Arts at New York University.

== Biography ==
=== Education ===
Joseph V. Melillo earned a Bachelor of Arts degree in English and theater at Sacred Heart University in Fairfield, CT and a Masters of Fine Arts in speech and drama at Catholic University of America in Washington, DC.

=== Career ===
Melillo was responsible for the artistic direction of theater, dance, music, visual art and film at the multi-venue arts center, which includes the Harvey Theater, Howard Gilman Opera House, Fishman Space, Rose Cinemas, and BAMcafé. Prior to that, working with President/Executive Producer Harvey Lichtenstein, Melillo was BAM's producing director, following a six-year tenure as founding director of the BAM Next Wave Festival.

Over 35 years at BAM, Melillo programmed the work of artists such as Pina Bausch, Philip Glass, Trisha Brown, Bill T. Jones/Arnie Zane, Merce Cunningham, Robert Wilson, Urban Bush Women, Ivo van Hove, Ralph Lemon, Lee Breuer/Bob Telson, Anne Bogart, Cheek by Jowl, Reggie Wilson, Mark Morris, Carl Hancock Rux and Michelle Dorrance. During his tenure, he worked with Karen Brooks Hopkins (BAM president from 1999—2015) and Katy Clark (BAM president from 2015—present).

He set up artistic partnerships such as the Bridge Project, a three-year series of international theater engagements with a trans-Atlantic company of actors directed by Sam Mendes and produced by BAM, The Old Vic, and Neal Street, and for seven seasons, DanceMotion USA^{sm}, an international cultural diplomacy program in partnership with the US Department of State. In 1999, the BAM Rose Cinemas opened with four screens, including one dedicated to repertory and special series.

Under Melillo's guidance, in 2012 BAM expanded to include the Richard B. Fisher Building. It includes the smaller, flexible Fishman Space, a third stage for BAM's programs, as well as the education department and children's programming. The history of Melillo's programming at BAM is described in two books: BAM: The Complete Works (2011) and BAM: The Next Wave Festival (2018). BAM's archive is digitized and publicly accessible through the Leon Levy Digital Archive.

== Awards ==
- Chevalier (1999) and Officier (2004) de L’ordre des Arts et des Lettres, France
- OBIE Award for International Programming (2002—3)
- Drama Desk Special Award for bringing works of distinction from around the world (2002—3)
- Honorary OBE for outstanding commitment to British performing arts in the US (2004)
- Knight of the Royal Order of the Polar Star for solidifying ties in performing arts between Sweden and the US (2007)
- Cultural ambassador for Taiwan for bringing the arts of Taiwan to US (2012)
- Honorary Doctorate of Humane Letters, St. Francis College, Brooklyn, NY (2012)
- Gaudium Award, Breukelein Institute (2012)
- National Medal of the Arts (2013), received by Joseph V. Melillo and Karen B. Hopkins on behalf of BAM
- Knight of the National Order of Québec (2016)
- Bessie Awards, Presenter Award for Outstanding Curating (2018)
- Aga Khan Music Initiative, advisor (2018—19)
- Medal of Commander of the Ordre des Arts et des Lettres, France (2019)
- International Citation of Merit, International Society for the Performing Arts (2020)

== Teaching and adjudication ==
Melillo has been an adjudicator/panelist for award-giving and honorary bodies including the Praemium Imperiale, Japan Art Association; Wexner Prize, Wexner Center for the Arts; Pew Fellowship in the Arts; and the Rolex Mentor and Protégé Arts Initiative. He has been on boards of directors (Association of Performing Arts Presenters; En Garde Arts); and has taught and lectured at places including Brooklyn College.
