= South Oxford Tennis Club =

Tennis club in New York City (1981–1997)

Coordinates: 40°41′1.6″N 73°58′20.9″W

The South Oxford Tennis Club was an athletic club and event space in the Fort Greene neighborhood of Brooklyn, New York which was in operation from 1981 to 1997. It was noted as the only Black-owned tennis club in New York City and for its role as a community hub, particularly for the Black and gay communities of its district. In the assessment of Patrick Sauer, "What started out as a Brooklyn hot spot for matches on green Har-Tru clay would become, during its 16-year existence, a focal point for the surrounding, predominantly Black neighborhoods. It was a place where kids could take free lessons, members competed in tournaments, future hip-hop legends spit rhymes, folks marked important occasions, politicians held fund-raisers, and the area's gay community found an unlikely locus."

== History ==
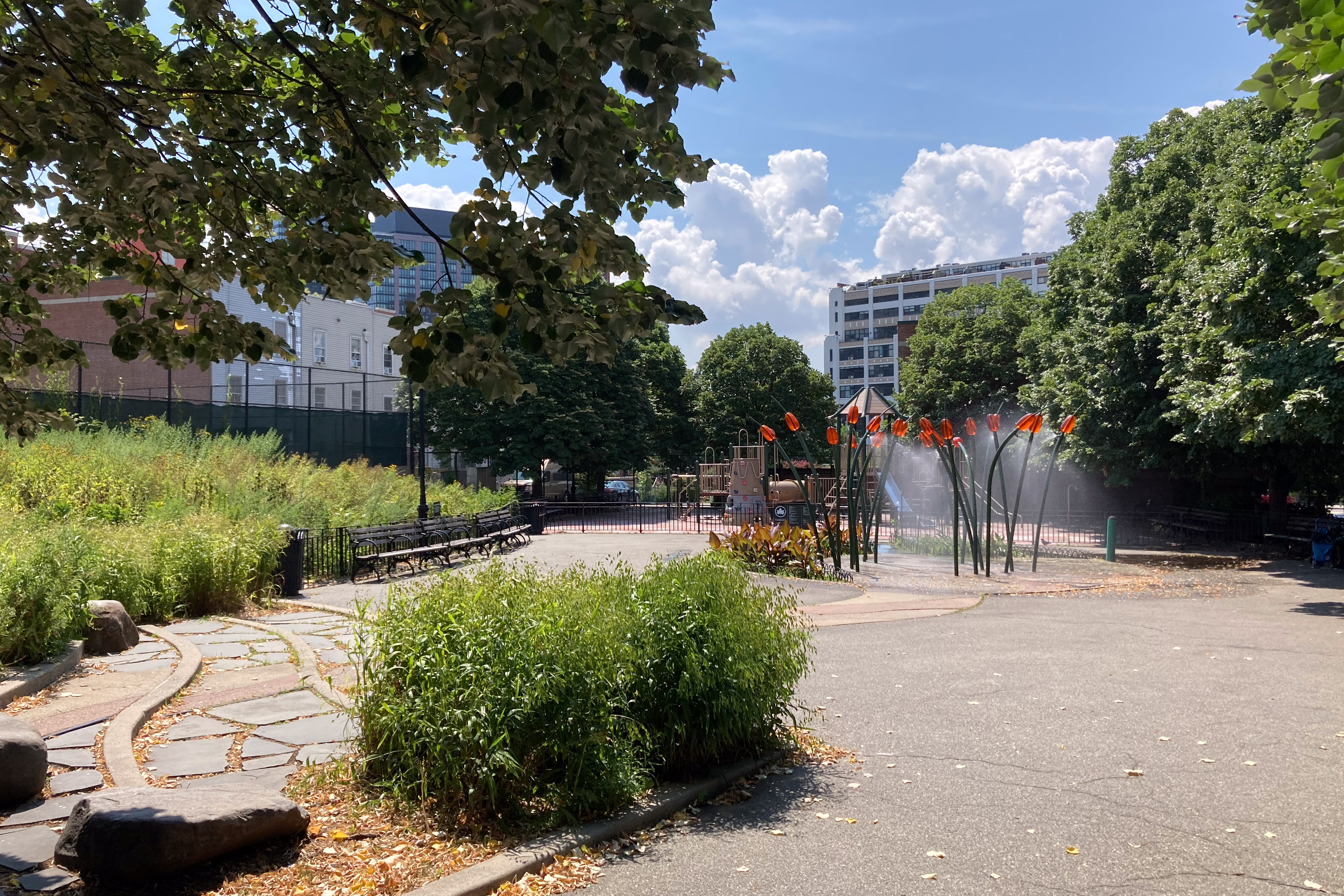
South Oxford Park in 2025

Founded in 1981 by Richard Northern, the club was located on South Oxford Street between Atlantic Avenue and Fulton Street. Its main building was a 5,000-square-foot neo-Georgian edifice, constructed in 1927 and once home to a funeral parlor, the New York and Brooklyn Casket Company.

In addition to the main building, the club had four tennis courts. Richard Northern leased the space from the city on a month-to-month basis, but in 1997 the city closed the club; the club house was demolished in 2001. After a period lying derelict, the land was replaced with South Oxford Park, a park completed in 2006.

While it was in operation, the South Oxford Tennis Club was the only Black-owned tennis club in New York City. The club hosted parties, fund-raisers, fashion shows, and free tennis clinics for children. Events that took place at the South Oxford Tennis Club included a Do the Right Thing-themed voter registration event featuring a performance by Spike Lee's father, jazz musician Bill Lee; a fundraiser concert for Mutulu Shakur featuring The Notorious B.I.G.; and dances.
