= Uli Beutter Cohen =

American documentarian

Uli Beutter Cohen is a German-born American documentarian, living in New York City. She is the creator of Subway Book Review on Instagram.

== Career ==
Uli Beutter Cohen's work explores connection, identity, and belonging. Over the course of her documentation for Subway Book Review, she has interviewed everyday people and prominent figures.

=== Subway Book Review ===
In 2013 Beutter Cohen moved to New York City and started documenting readers on the subway. She shares her photography and interviews on social media. What started as an experiment on the Q Train has been called "one of the few purely good things on the internet" and has been widely praised by reviewers.

For Subway Book Review's 5-year anniversary in 2019, Beutter Cohen threw a surprise party on the G train and gave away over 400 books to commuters. Broad City's Abbi Jacobson joined the afterparty as a surprise guest.

== Activism ==
Beutter Cohen is a social justice advocate. She served on the advisory board of the Black Gotham Experience and is currently an active member of PEN America's Literary Action Coalition speaking to how the publishing industry needs to change sustainably to support multidimensional, intersectional writers and readers.
