= Moe's (bar and lounge) =

New York City bar (2007–2011)

Coordinates: 40.68702°N 73.97471°W

Moe's was a bar in Fort Greene, Brooklyn that closed in 2011.

== History ==
Opened in a former tailor's shop in June 2001 by Ruby Lawrence and Chelsea Altman, the bar was popular and unusual in aggressively gentrifying post-Giuliani New York City in that it attracted an extremely mixed crowd, racially, gender-wise, and socially. New York magazine found it so racially diverse they quipped "they should shoot an after-school special here." The Village Voice called it a "nightlife crucible for the colliding worlds of old-school Fort Greene, urban bohemianism, and yuppification."

The bar's bi-level space was decorated with thrift-store furnishings, a vibrating chair, and a dance floor in the back. The namesake character from The Simpsons, bar owner / operator Moe Szyslak, was honored with a drink special and a poster in the bathroom.

== Closing ==
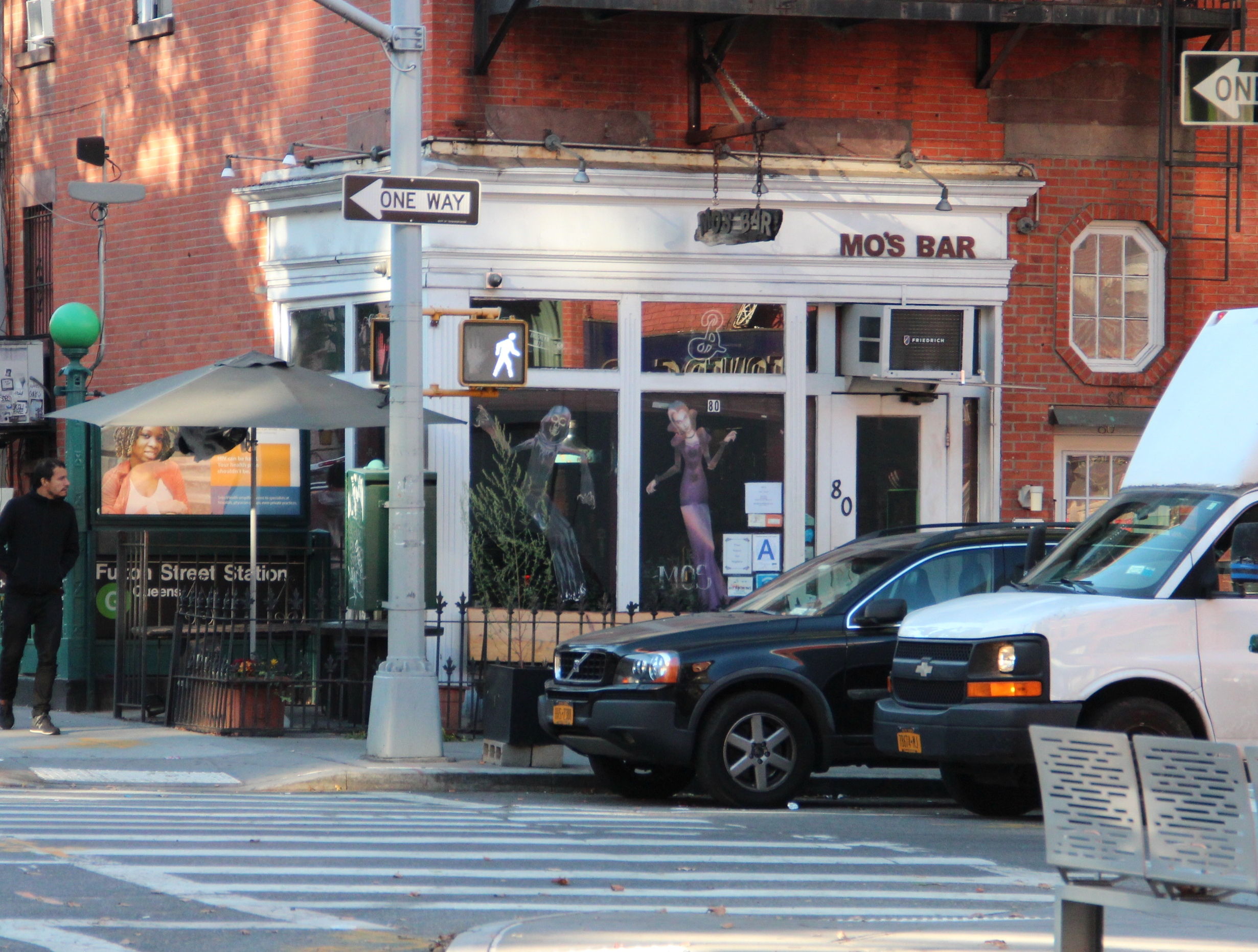
Mo's Bar and Lounge in 2017

Moe's closed at the end of April 2011 due to rising rent, and hundreds packed its closing. The new renters controversially named the new bar that took its place Mo's.
