= Karen Brooks Hopkins =

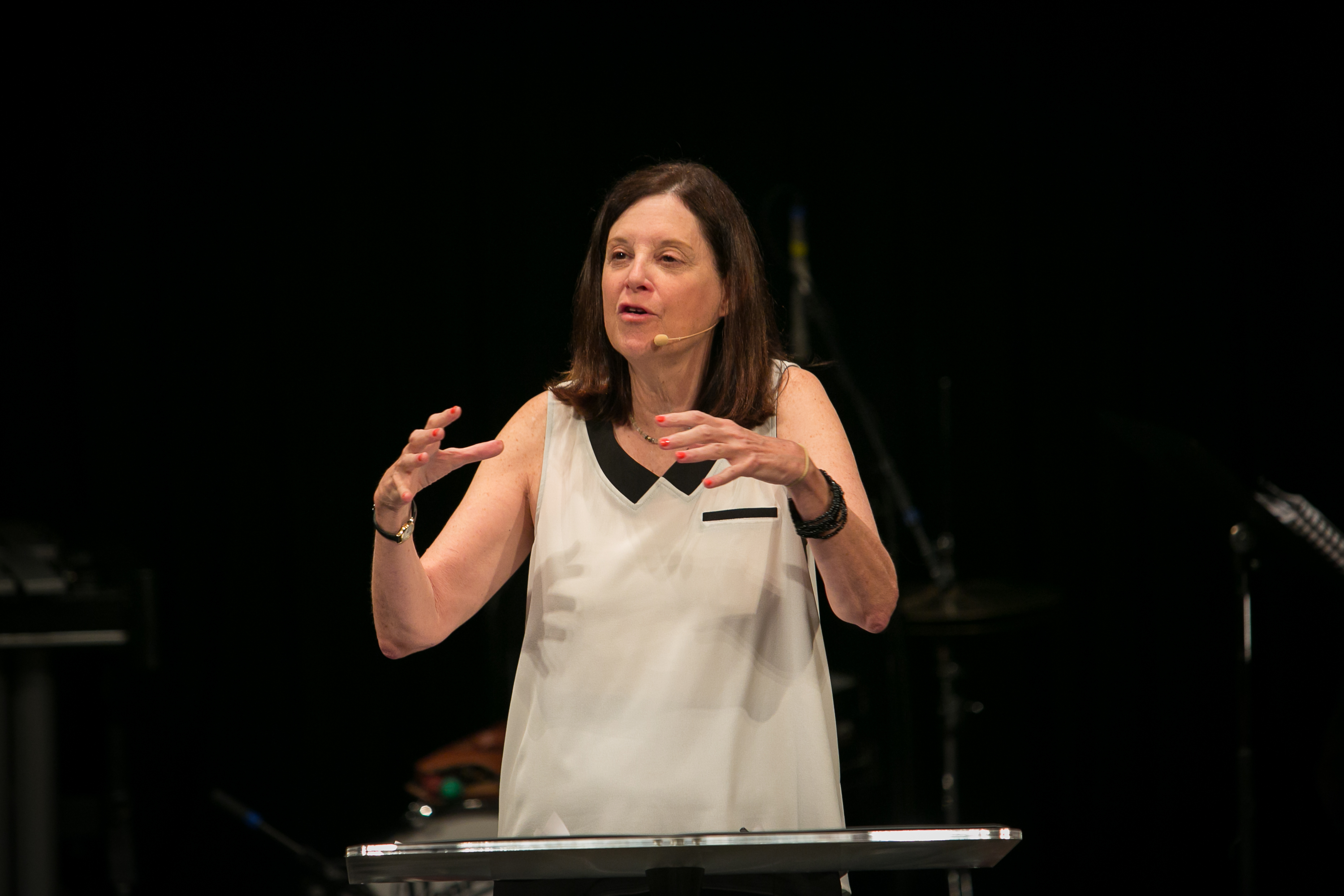
Karen Brooks Hopkins

Karen Brooks Hopkins is the president emerita of Brooklyn Academy of Music, having served as its president from 1999 to 2015. Previously she was an adjunct professor for the Brooklyn College Program for Arts Administration. In the spring of 1995, Hopkins served as the executive producer of the Bergman Festival, which celebrated the life and work of Swedish director Ingmar Bergman.

== Education ==
Hopkins studied at the University of Maryland and received her MFA from George Washington University.

== Publications ==
She is the author of the book, Successful Fundraising for Arts & Cultural Organizations (1997), published by Greenwood Publishing, and the book, BAM... and Then It Hit Me (2021), published by Powerhouse Books, a memoir of her 36 years leading America's oldest performing arts center.

== Awards and recognition ==
The success of the Bergman Festival earned her a medal from the Royal Dramatic Theatre of Sweden and also, in recognition of her work on behalf of the Norwegian National Ballet, Norway awarded her its St. Olav Medal. In November 2006, Hopkins was awarded the honor of Chevalier de L’Ordre des arts et des Lettres by the Republic of France for her work supporting the French arts in the United States. In 2007, she was named one of the “100 Most Influential Women in New York City Business” by Crain’s. That same year, she was appointed Commander of the Royal Order of the Polar Star, in recognition of her role in solidifying ties between the performing arts communities of Sweden and the United States. In May 2012, Hopkins was awarded an honorary Doctorate of Humane Letters from St. Francis College, Brooklyn, NY. In March 2014 she was named by Brooklyn Magazine to the list of "The 100 Most Influential People in Brooklyn Culture".

In January 2025, the Brooklyn Academy of Music opened a new facility named after Hopkins, called BAM Karen or BAM KBH, as part of the L10 Arts and Cultural Center located at 300 Ashland Place / 10 Lafayette Avenue.
