= Vincenzo Marinelli =

Italian painter

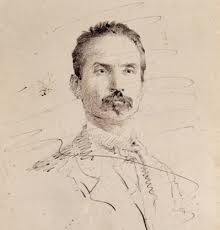
- Vicenzo Marinelli, Self-portrait,
- Born: 5 June 1820; San Martino d'Agri, Province of Potenza, Basilicata, Kingdom of the Two Sicilies
- Died: 18 January 1892 (aged 71); Naples, Italy
- Education: Royal Institute of Fine Arts of Naples; Academy of Rome
- Known for: Painter, teacher
- Movement: Orientalist
- Awards: Order of the Crown of Italy

Vincenzo Marinelli (5 June 1820 – 18 January 1892) was an Italian painter, known best for his Orientalist canvases based on his travels in Greece, Crete, Egypt, and Sudan.

== Biography ==
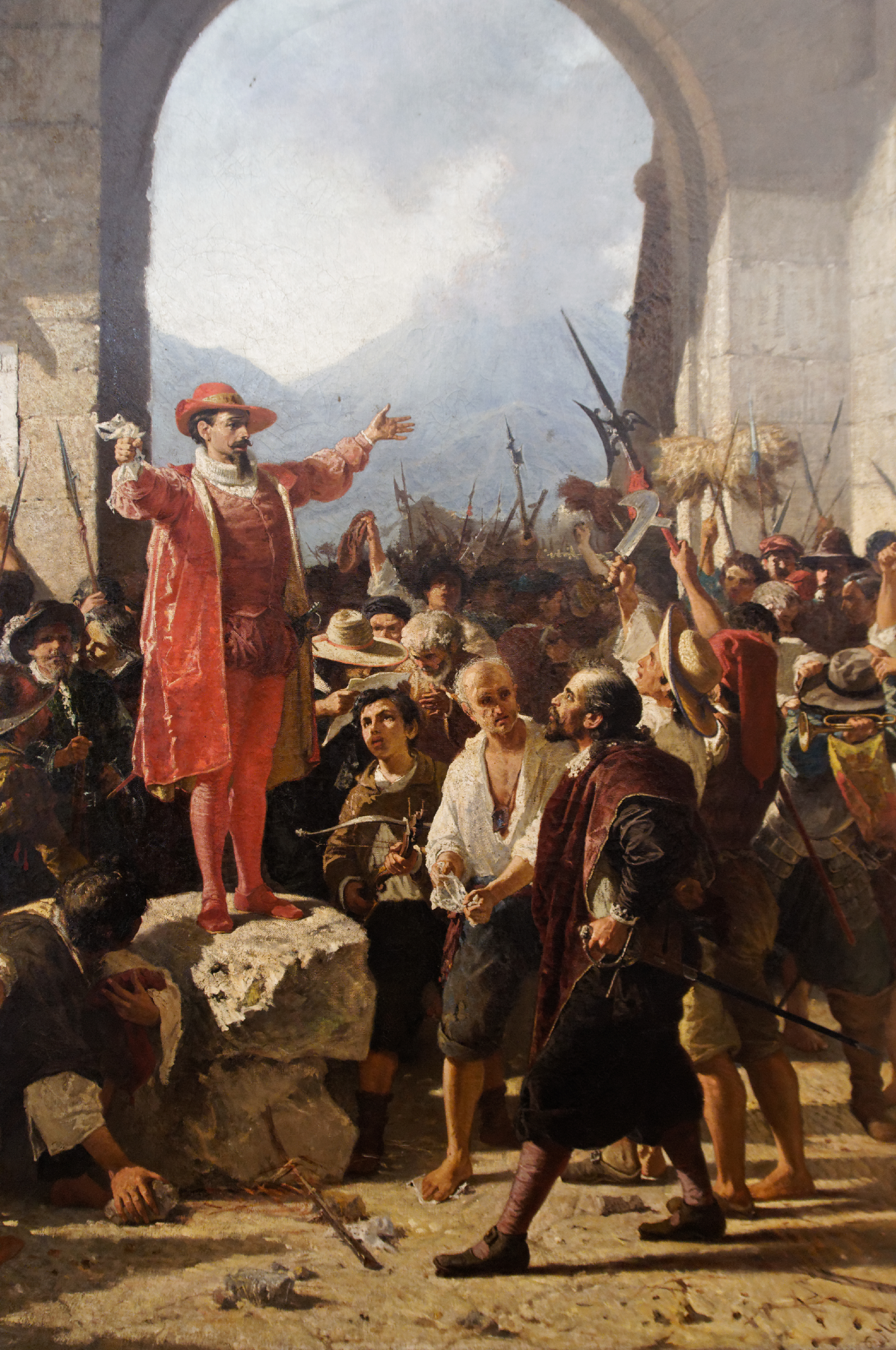
Cesare Mormile Addresses the People Rebelling against the Decrees of the Inquisition

Marinelli was born in San Martino d'Agri near Potenza. His father was a surgeon and a dedicated Jacobin. At the age of 17, he moved to Naples to complete his literary and scientific studies. By the age of 22, he dedicated himself to painting and studied under Costanzo Angelini at the Royal Institute of Fine Arts of Naples. Obtaining a scholarship from the Province of Basilicata, from 1842 to 1848, he studied in Rome at the Academy under Tommaso Minardi.

Returning to Naples after the restoration, he travelled through Greece working for Otto, King of Greece. He visited the Greek Isles and painted for the Cathedral of Rethymno in Crete. He then travelled to Egypt, where he completed works for the Ottoman Khedive, Muhammad Sa'id Pasha, accompanying him on a nine-month trip to Sudan. Back in Naples in 1859, ten years later, he was invited to the inauguration of the Suez Canal. He returned to Egypt and travelled up to the first cataract of the Nile.

Again returning to Italy, he won a contest in 1875 to become Professor of design and figure at the Royal Institute of Fine Arts in Naples, and in 1881, upon the resignation of Domenico Morelli, he was named Professor of painting at the Royal Institute. He taught from 1865 to 1887 at the Royal Educandato Femminile Regina Maria Pia. He died in Naples on 18 January 1892.

Among his works are: Parnassus and Great Poets of Antiquity in 17 life size canvases for the Royal Palace in Athens; two large altarpieces: Assumption of the Virgin and Baptism of Christ in the Jordan for the Cathedral of San Antonio of Padua in Rethymno; a canvas of recollecting his trip to Sudan, Khedive Said Pasha ordering the caravan to form, Ballo dell' ape nell Harem (Dance of the Bee in the Harem), and le Baiadere exhibited in 1862 at the first International Exposition of London; Cleopatra and her handmaidens receive Antonio; Cesare Mormile addresses the people rebelling against the decrees of the Inquisition; Un episodio del Cantico dei cantici; Il ritorno del tappeto dalla Mecca; and The Kamsin once in the Gladstone House at Liverpool; Henry IV at Canossa; Un corteo nuziale arabo and Una fiera di schiavi nel deserto.

His Ballo dell'ape garnered notoriety in prior centuries for its exotic and sensuous tone; modern attention is likely more to be disturbed by the depiction of an African courtesan, likely a slave, dancing half-naked for her Arab ruler.

For his Ferrante Carafa riding through the streets of Naples with Masaniello, the popular hero, seated on the horse behind him (1870, Exhibition at Parma), awarded a gold medal at the Exhibition of Parma and a thousand lire by the Ministry of Public Education. For this latter work, he was awarded the cross of the Order of the Crown of Italy, and the painting was moved to the Pinacoteca of the city of Turin.

== See also ==
- List of Orientalist artists
- Orientalism
