= Ezequiel Melillo (footballer, born 1990) =

Argentine professional footballer

Personal information
- Full name: Ezequiel Vicente Melillo
- Date of birth: 1 June 1990 (age 36)
- Place of birth: La Plata, Argentina
- Height: 1.76 m (5 ft 9 in)
- Position: Midfielder

Team information
- Current team: San Miguel

Youth career
- Peñarol Infantil Olmos
- Villa San Carlos

Senior career*
Years	Team	Apps	(Gls)
2009–2015	Villa San Carlos	78	(10)
2012–2013	→ Racing Club (loan)	0	(0)
2015–2016	Central Norte		
2016–2018	San Telmo	60	(9)
2018–2019	Almirante Brown	25	(3)
2019–2022	Tristán Suárez	66	(11)
2022–	San Miguel	0	(0)
- * Club domestic league appearances and goals as of 17:51, 8 June 2022 (UTC)

Ezequiel Vicente Melillo (born 1 June 1990) is an Argentine professional footballer who plays as a midfielder for San Miguel.

== Career ==
Melillo played in the youth ranks of Peñarol Infantil Olmos, before continuing his career with Villa San Carlos. Ten goals in fifty-five appearances arrived in three Primera B Metropolitana seasons from 2009–10, which included a hat-trick over Tristán Suárez on 11 August 2011. In July 2012, Melillo joined Primera División side Racing Club on loan. He didn't feature in 2012–13, a season which his parent club ended with promotion to Primera B Nacional; where he'd appear twenty-three times as they were relegated back down. Central Norte became Melillo's third team in 2015, which preceded him signing for San Telmo in 2016.

After participating in sixty games and netting nine goals across two campaigns, Melillo completed a move to Almirante Brown on 13 June 2018. His debut came in a defeat to Estudiantes on 20 August, which was followed by his first goal against All Boys in September. July 2019 saw Melillo head across Primera B Metropolitana to Tristán Suárez. He scored five goals in twenty-one games in his first season there.

On 2 June 2022, Melillo joined San Miguel.

== Career statistics ==
As of 17 July 2020.

Appearances and goals by club, season and competition
Club	Season	League			Cup		League Cup		Continental		Other		Total	
Club	Season	Division	Apps	Goals	Apps	Goals	Apps	Goals	Apps	Goals	Apps	Goals	Apps	Goals
Villa San Carlos	2012–13	Primera B Metropolitana	0	0	0	0	—		—		0	0	0	0
Villa San Carlos	2013–14	Primera B Nacional	23	0	0	0	—		—		0	0	23	0
Villa San Carlos	Total		23	0	0	0	—		—		0	0	23	0
Racing Club (loan)	2012–13	Primera División	0	0	0	0	—		—		0	0	0	0
San Telmo	2016–17	Primera B Metropolitana	33	5	0	0	—		—		0	0	33	5
San Telmo	2017–18	Primera B Metropolitana	27	4	0	0	—		—		0	0	27	4
San Telmo	Total		60	9	0	0	—		—		0	0	60	9
Almirante Brown	2018–19	Primera B Metropolitana	25	3	0	0	—		—		0	0	25	3
Tristán Suárez	2019–20	Primera B Metropolitana	21	5	0	0	—		—		0	0	21	5
Career total			129	17	0	0	—		—		0	0	129	17
