= Art Deco architecture of New York City =

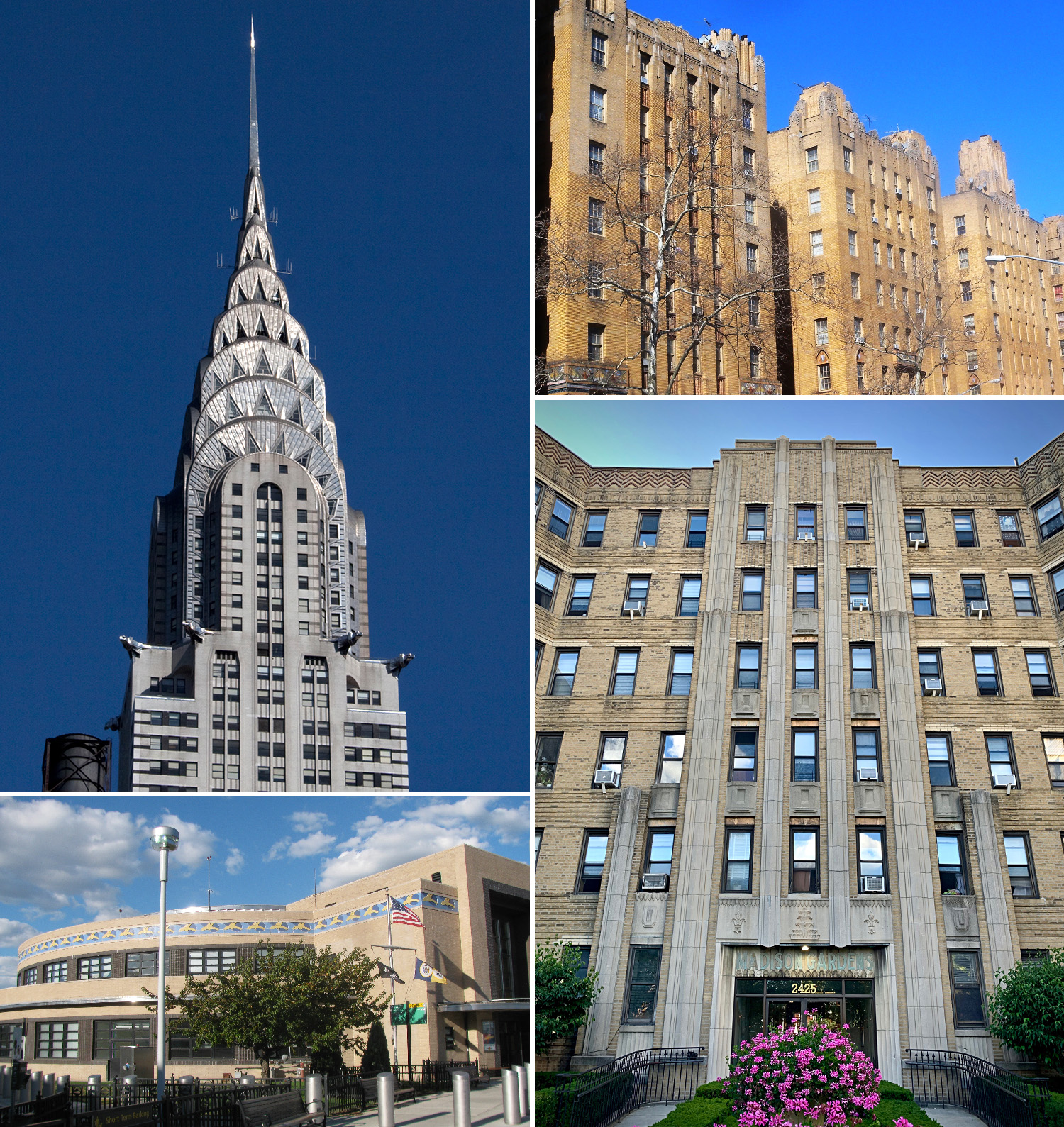
Clockwise from top left: Spire of the Chrysler Building, Manhattan; upper levels of the Park Plaza Apartments, the Bronx; entrance of Madison Gardens apartments, Brooklyn; and the Marine Air Terminal exterior, Queens

Art Deco architecture flourished in New York City during the 1920s and 1930s. The style broke with many traditional architectural conventions and was characterized by verticality, ornamentation, and building materials such as plastics, metals, and terra cotta. Art Deco is found in government edifices, commercial projects, and residential buildings in all five boroughs. The architecture of the period was influenced by worldwide decorative arts trends, the rise of mechanization, and New York City's 1916 Zoning Resolution, which favored the setback feature in many buildings.

The exuberant economy of the Roaring Twenties and commercial speculation spurred a citywide building boom. The size and sophistication of Art Deco ranged from towering skyscrapers to modest middle-class housing and municipal buildings. Colorful, lavishly decorated skyscrapers came to dominate the skyline of Manhattan before the Great Depression ended their construction. The Depression and changing tastes pushed the style to more subdued applications as it spread in the 1930s, becoming a style of choice for infrastructure projects and modern middle-class apartments in the outer boroughs.

A lull in construction during World War II and the rise of the International Style led to the end of new Art Deco in the city. After falling out of favor and suffering from neglect during the city's downturn in the latter half of the 20th century, the city's Art Deco has been reappraised. Among New York's most treasured and recognizable skyscrapers are the Art Deco Empire State and Chrysler buildings. Art Deco skyscrapers formed the core of the city's skyline for decades and influence modern construction. Many of these buildings are protected by historic preservation laws, while others have been lost to new development or neglect.

== Background ==
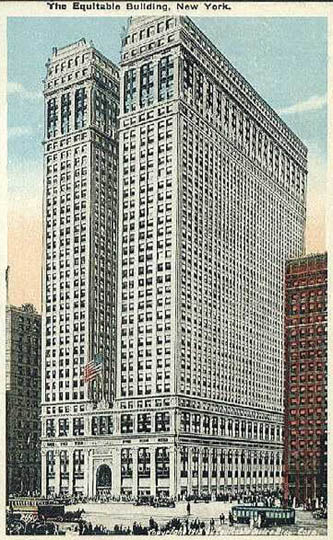
The Equitable Building's size spurred the passage of zoning laws that affected Art Deco architecture in the city.

American Art Deco has its origins in European arts, especially the style moderne popularized at the 1925 International Exhibition of Modern Decorative and Industrial Arts in Paris, from which Art Deco draws its name (Exposition internationale des arts décoratifs et industriels modernes). While the United States did not officially participate, Americans—including New York City architect Irwin Chanin—visited the exposition, and the US government also sent a delegation. Their resulting reports helped spread the style to America. Other influences included German expressionism, the Austrian Secession, Art Nouveau, cubism, and the ornament of African, Central American, and South American cultures. American Art Deco architecture would assume different forms across the country, influenced by local culture, laws, and tastes.

Art Deco came into style just as New York City was being rapidly transformed. An exploding population, flush economic times, cheap credit, and lax zoning combined to encourage a building boom. The real estate market was so frenetic that buildings that had stood for just a few years were regularly torn down for newer construction. New, larger buildings replaced multiple smaller structures on old lots. The amount of office space in New York City increased by 92% in the late 1920s.

Zoning regulations had major impacts on the design of buildings. The proliferation of ever-larger skyscrapers like the 40-story Equitable Building spurred New York City's passage of the US's first citywide zoning code, the 1916 Zoning Resolution. The regulations, intended to prevent tall buildings from cutting off light and air at street level, required buildings to "set back" from street level depending on the width of the street and the zoned area. After a building rose up and set back to cover 25% of the lot, the total height was unrestricted. The impact of the new regulations did not materialize until later in the decade, as American entry into World War I slowed construction.

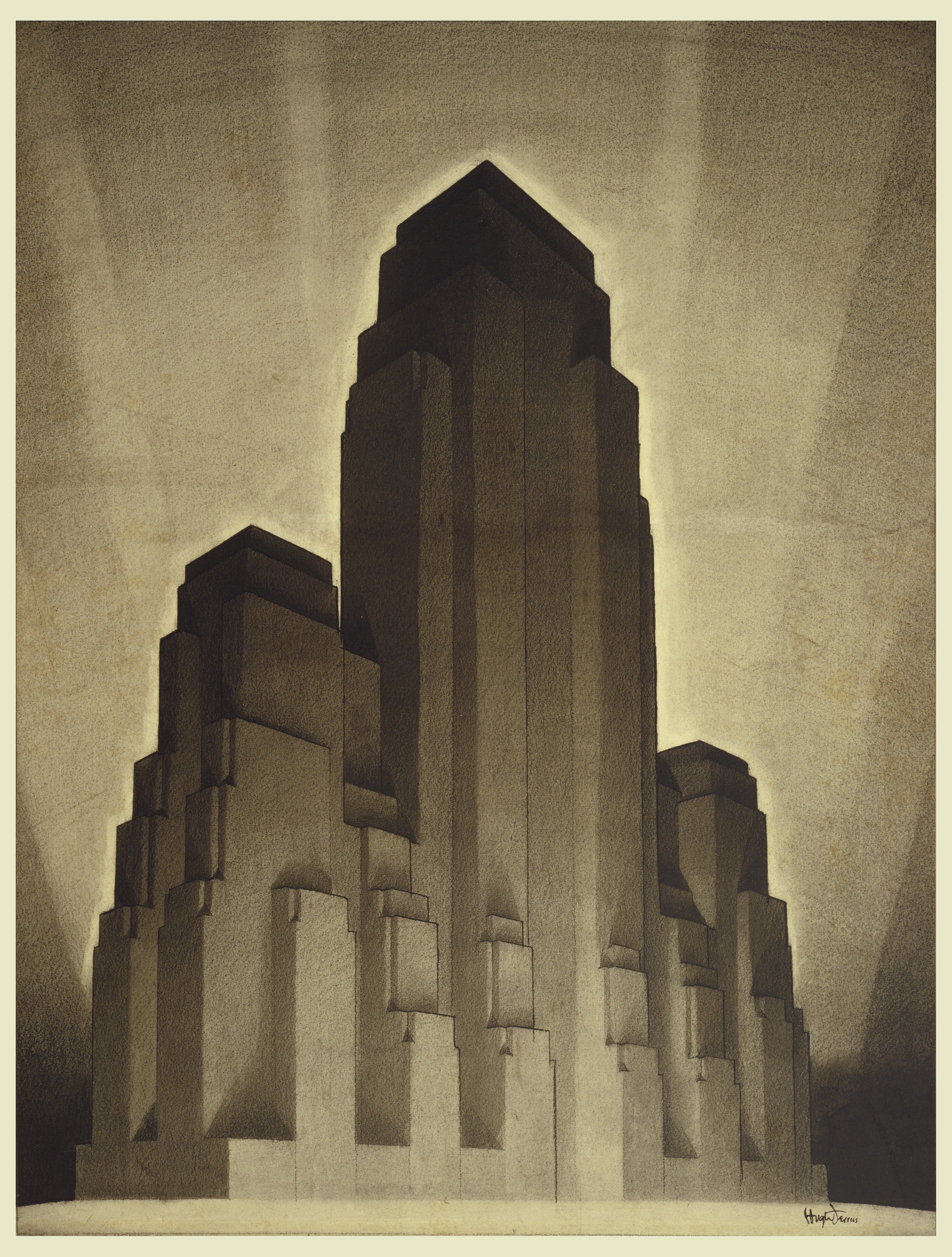
Hugh Ferriss' illustration, demonstrating an approach to New York City's setbacks requirements that would come to define the city's Art Deco buildings

Early buildings built to conform to the new codes did so unimaginatively—the Heckscher Building in Midtown (completed 1921) set back evenly like a stack of boxes as it rose—but more inspired interpretations of the law followed. A major influence on the resulting skyscrapers was Eliel Saarinen's second-place design entry for Chicago's Tribune Tower, considered a new style distinct from earlier Gothic or Classical architecture. Also influential were architect and illustrator Hugh Ferriss' series of speculative architectural illustrations exploring how to make buildings that met the zoning requirements. Ferriss' illustrations envisioned buildings as sculptural forms rather than simple boxes. Architect Talbot Hamlin described Ferriss' work as "a magic wand to set the American city architecture free from its nightmare [...] No longer was the high building apparently built by the mile and cut off to order, but it was composed break upon break, buttress on buttress. The possibilities of poetry entered in."

Precursors to the Art Deco skyscrapers that soon went up across the city were buildings such as Raymond Hood's American Radiator Building (1924), which was neo-Gothic in general style but featured abstract ornament that would characterize Art Deco. Another early transitional building was the Madison Belmont Building at 181 Madison Avenue (1924–1925), which featured traditional ornamentation and organization on upper floors, combined with Art Deco motifs on the lower floors. The Art Deco ironwork was provided by Edgar Brandt, who contributed the entrance gates to the 1925 Paris Exhibition. One of the first Art Deco skyscrapers was the New York Telephone Company Building, built between 1923–1927 and designed by Ralph Thomas Walker. Its muted color and ornament did not fully demonstrate the style that soon flourished across the city, but its massing and verticality were thoroughly modern and broke with established architectural styles.

== Common elements ==
The buildings that would later be described as Art Deco shared common elements. The setback laws resulted in sculptural buildings with long, uninterrupted piers rising between columns of windows and decorated spandrels. These choices were made to emphasize the height of the buildings, a choice mimicked even on much shorter buildings built across town. New York's architects were at the forefront of using new materials, including synthetics like Bakelite and Formica plastics, as well as Nirosta, a corrosion-resistant steel alloy that made exterior metal on skyscrapers more feasible. Where stainless steel was too expensive to use, aluminum's declining price and lighter weight made it a common choice for interior and exterior usage. Other favored materials were multicolored terra cotta, limestone, and glass brick. Even when traditional building materials were used—marble, wood, brick, bronze—they were combined in novel ways, intending to shock and delight.

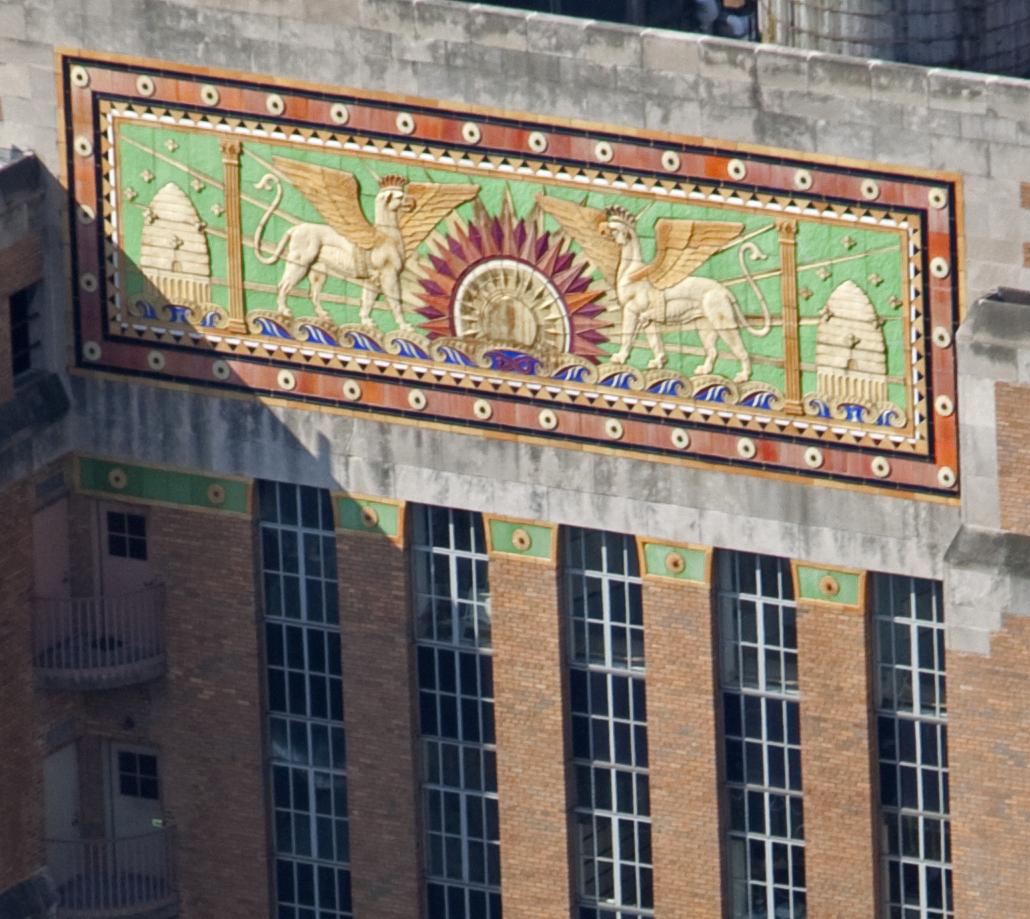
Detail of the Fred F. French Building's upper floors, showing beehives, bees, griffins, and a sunburst

Architectural historian Rosemarie Haag Bletter described the most pronounced element of Art Deco as its use of "sumptuous ornament". The most dynamic elements were reserved for entrances and at the tops of buildings, with multiple materials combined to form dazzling colors or rich textures. Sometimes the buildings were shaded—using darker-colored materials at the base, and then gradually lightening towards the top—to increase the building's visibility. Art Deco buildings in the city were also richly appointed inside and out with reliefs, mosaics, murals, and other art. Allegorical depictions—such as beehives of industry on the Fred F. French Building, personifications of virtues at Rockefeller Center, or figures portraying industry and the arts at the International Magazine Building—were common decorative elements. The entries and lobbies of these skyscrapers often drew direct influence from the painted sets and stages of theaters, with framing like hanging curtains. Elaborate ironwork blended with decorative frosted or etched glass.

Art Deco in New York became intrinsically linked with commercial architecture. Its focus on rich ornamentation appealed to commercial patrons who wanted an "acceptable" modern style. These developers in turn gave architects a permissive mandate to create in the style, as long as the end result was not too shocking. The buildings rose to the height where the cost of added space equalized with the commercial value of that space. The emerging style was contemporaneously called the "vertical style", "skyscraper style", or simply "modern", with the characteristic look of setback buildings leading to them being called "wedding cake" buildings. Architect Ely Jacques Kahn commented in 1926 on the emerging style that his brethren were creating with their buildings:

[It] is so characteristic of New York that it would be more logical, by far, to call it a New York Style. [...] Decoration becomes a far more precious thing than a collection of dead leaves, swags, bull's heads and cartouches. It becomes a means of enriching the surface with a play of light and shade, voices and solids. [Today's ornamental forms] respond to the bulk and simplicity of the skyscraper itself.

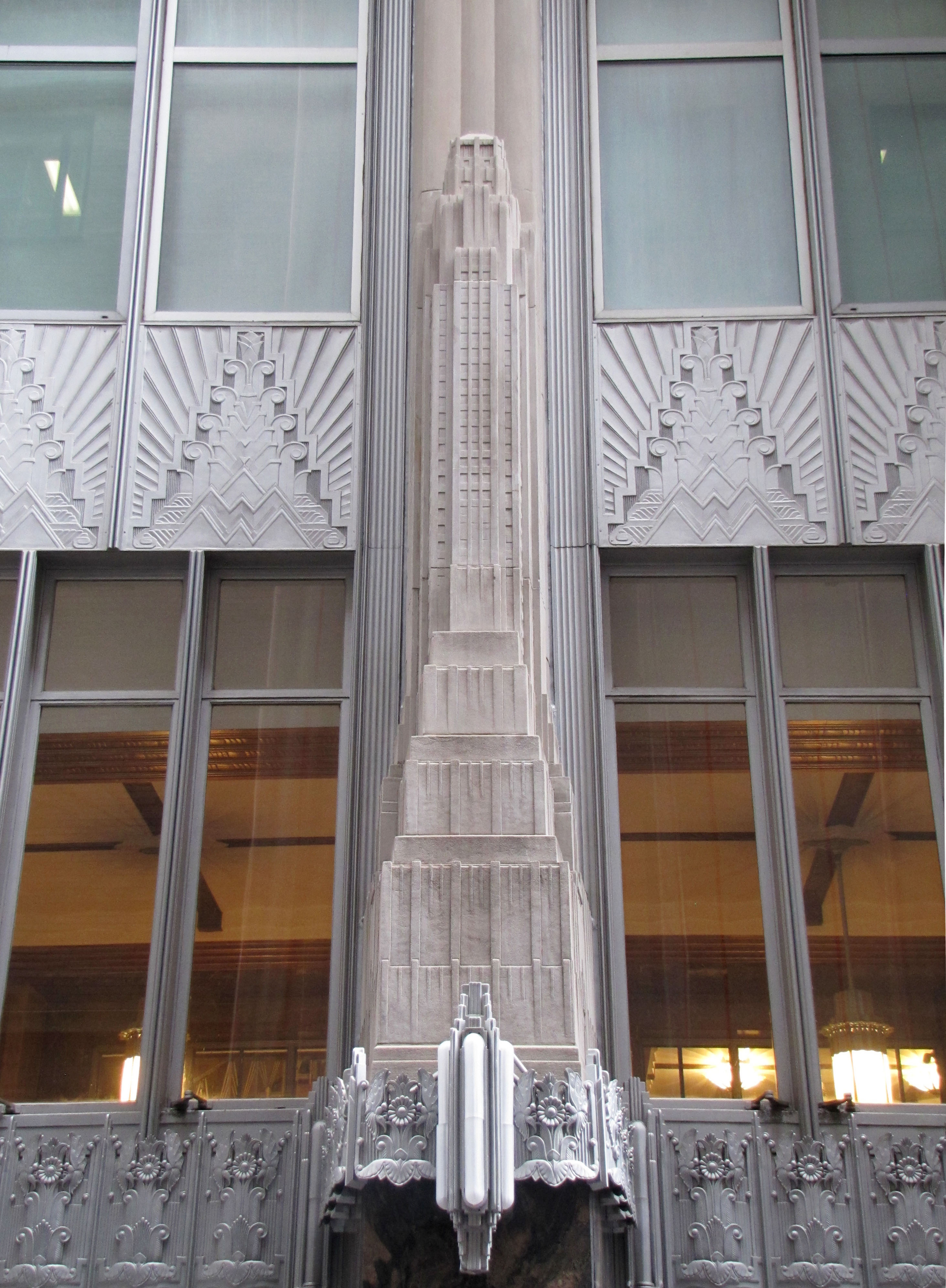
Entrance to 70 Pine Street, featuring geometric aluminum spandrels and a limestone model of the building

The demand for Art Deco buildings was such that even architectural firms known for more restrained, classical designs adopted the new style. Cross & Cross's main practice was for discreet townhomes and banks, but in the late 1920s, they produced modern skyscrapers such as the RCA Victor Building. The 50-story skyscraper turned Gothic tracery into stylized lightning bolts. Another conservative firm that moved to modernistic designs was Walker & Gillette, whose best-known Art Deco building in New York is the Fuller Building. Buildings already being constructed were sometimes appended with Art Deco flourishes; the Paramount Building at 1501 Broadway (1926) had an Art Deco clock tower appended to a Beaux-Arts base. These buildings were constructed either as headquarters for established and emerging companies, or else speculative projects where the money would be drawn from renting out the space in the new building.

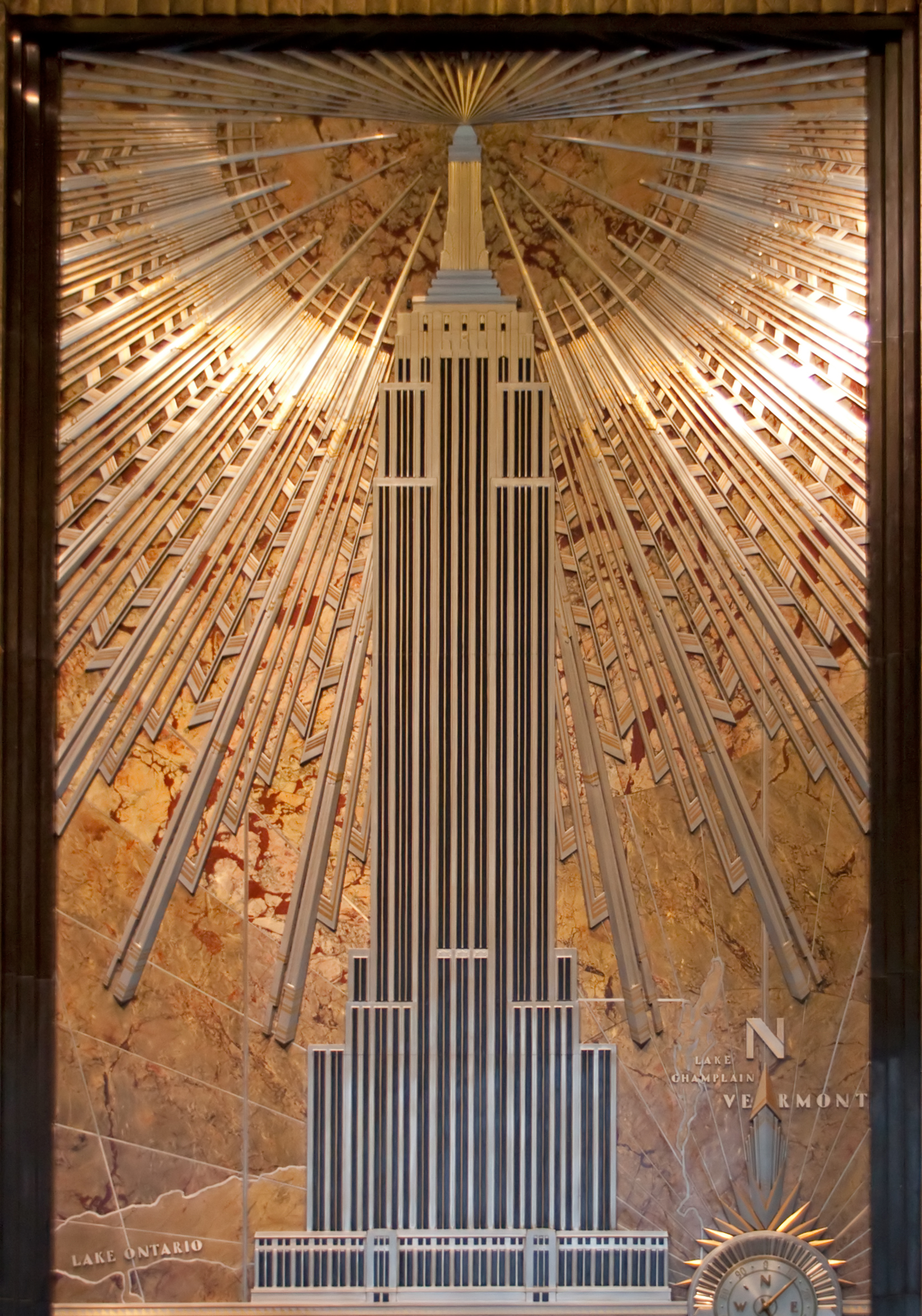
Empire State Building Entrance decoration

The design of speculative buildings was chiefly driven by maximizing rentable space, whereas corporate buildings served as advertisements for the corporations themselves—spending money not for direct financial gain, but what architect Timothy L. Pflueger termed "special architectural appeal". Even with these corporate projects, however, the owners often lent space to smaller businesses and treated them as real estate investments. The look of the buildings often echoed the business conducted there; the RCA Victor Building's wave motifs represent the power of radio, while the Chrysler Building had ornamental touches of radiators and hubcaps representing the automobile company. The McGraw-Hill Building, New Yorker Hotel, and Daily News Building feature their names in prominent signage or embedded into the facade. Because the true shape of the building was often hard to grasp for a street-level observer, many skyscrapers featured miniature versions of themselves as part of their ground-level decoration.

In the Financial District and downtown Manhattan, the skyline was quickly transformed by the proliferation of Art Deco high-rises. The New York Telephone Company Building was decorated with motifs derived from Aztec designs, and the lobby featured a vaulting ceiling with frescoes detailing the history of communication. Other notable Art Deco skyscrapers in downtown include the Irving Trust Company Building (1929–1931), designed with a "curtain" exterior and Hildreth Meiere-produced mosaics in the interior; 120 Wall Street (1929–1930), with a wedding-cake form and a red granite and limestone base; and the City Bank-Farmers Trust Building (1930–1931), featuring abstract heads along the facade looking down at street level, and bronzed doors featuring transportation methods. The final skyscraper built before World War II in the Financial District was 70 Pine Street, completed in 1932. It featured unique double-deck elevators servicing two lobby floors, designed to maximize the profitable space of the small plot.

In comparison to downtown, which already had skyscrapers dating to the previous century and fewer available plots, Midtown Manhattan was only just beginning to develop its skyline as Art Deco became popular. Its business district was booming after the construction of Grand Central Terminal and the undergrounding of train tracks opening up new plots for development. 42nd Street became Midtown's major Art Deco thoroughfare, hosting some of the city's most famous skyscrapers. One of the earliest was the Chanin Building (1927–1929), headquarters for the Chanin Construction Company. It featured exterior buttresses evocative of miniature skyscrapers, along with abstract floral reliefs on the lower floors. Inside, the lobby included bronze grills that laud the economic opportunity of the city.

New York's architects were caught in a furious race for the title of tallest building in the world, and several Art Deco buildings vied for the title. By the end of 1930 more than 11 building plans had more than 60 floors; among them were the Chrysler Building and the Empire State Building, both of which increased in height from earlier drafts. In competition with 40 Wall Street for the title of the tallest building, architect William Van Alen secretly constructed the Chrysler Building's 185-foot (56 m) steel spire within the building itself, hoisting it and securing it into position in a single day, claiming the title of the tallest building. The triumph was short-lived; a month later former governor and businessman Al Smith updated the plans for the Empire State Building, adding more stories and a 200-foot spire of its own.

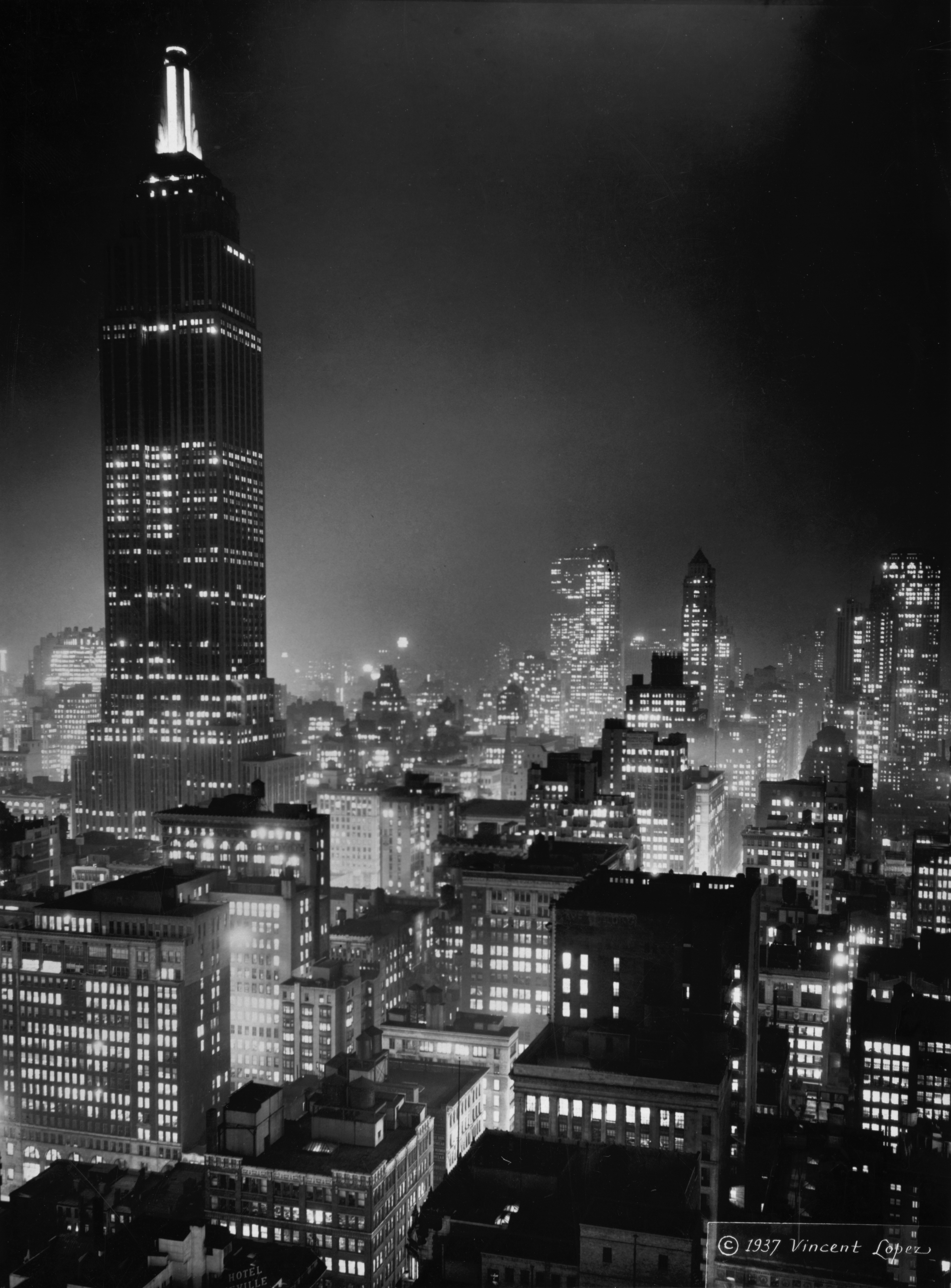
The Empire State Building towers above the city's skyline in 1937. The unoccupied and unlit floors are visible.

The Chrysler Building's spire went up just one day before the October 1929 Wall Street Crash that triggered the economic turmoil of the Great Depression. The immediate impact of the Depression was a reduction in building of all kinds; one architectural firm went from 17 filed plans for buildings up to 30 stories in 1929 to just three plans in 1930, the tallest being four stories. The scope of some existing construction was also downsized; the Metropolitan Life Company intended to capture the title for the tallest building with the Metropolitan Life North Building, but construction stopped during the downturn and never resumed, leaving it an "enormous stump" of 31 stories instead of the planned hundred. In the shadow of the deepening Depression, the Metropolitan Opera abandoned its plans to move to a new three-block complex financed by John D. Rockefeller Jr. Rockefeller decided to proceed with the construction of Rockefeller Center, hiring three different architectural firms. The architects envisioned a plan for buildings arranged on several axes, clad in the same materials. At the center was 30 Rockefeller Plaza. The Rockefellers earmarked $150,000 ($2,891,000 adjusted for inflation) for art in the plaza alone, filling the space with paintings, reliefs, and sculptural forms. The decorative features focus on the achievements of humankind, mythology, and stories of education and commerce.

== Art Deco in the city ==
=== Commercial ===
The heyday of Art Deco skyscrapers was effectively ended by the Great Depression, but Art Deco had proliferated outwards across the city in myriad forms. Art Deco proved a popular style for an expanding range of modern commercial edifices that proliferated during the period—department stores, news offices, and transportation. The initial prevailing wisdom was that the real estate market would quickly recover. To tide landowners over until economic conditions improved, many built "taxpayers" on their lots—single or two-story buildings. Despite being intended as temporary, many of these buildings remained for decades afterward. One such Art Deco taxpayer was the East River Savings Bank on 22 Cortlandt Street, which replaced a fifteen-story building from the 1890s. The New York Times dubbed the lot "the most valuable piece of New York real estate for a taxpayer in the city." Despite being a more modest building, the structure is appointed with polished stone eagles, interior marble, and at one time featured a 3,000-square-foot (280 m^{2}) mural of the East River. Completed speculative buildings faced issues in the difficult economy—the Empire State Building took more in as a tourist attraction than from tenants, and office buildings across Midtown were pressured by the Rockefeller Center's aggressive courting of tenants.

As the 1930s progressed, the rental market began to improve, and the pace of construction increased. The buildings that went up in this period tended to be more reserved, with grayer, more austere versions of Art Deco; Bletter suggests that this change was due to the influence of mechanization, and the lush, colorful look of the earlier style now appearing "frivolous". Terra cotta decoration was replaced with smoother, rounded surfaces, and metal-clad streamlining influenced by vehicular designs. Throughout the Art Deco period, brick was the most common building material for ordinary buildings, but even here bricklayers created geometric designs by alternating the color of brick or the coursing.

Art Deco was a popular choice for the movie theaters and stages being built at the time, an apropos choice given that Art Deco itself found influence in design from films, including German Expressionist works such as Fritz Lang's Metropolis. Art Deco theaters in the city included the Ziegfeld Theater, an explicit example of the building-as-set metaphor, with the facade including a proscenium to mirror the one indoors. As the Roaring Twenties ended, so too did the era of the large movie palace, and smaller Art Deco theaters like the Metro Theater on the Upper West Side and the RKO Midway Theater in Ridgewood, Queens served more modest audiences.

As the city developed northward, Manhattan's most prestigious department and retail stores moved to Midtown. Along Fifth Avenue, the rise of the Empire State and other Art Deco buildings corresponded with the street's transformation from a "millionaire's mile" of wealthy residences to middle-class commercial business. The Tiffany & Co. flagship store at 727 Fifth Avenue, built 1940, was designed to feature luxurious amenities including central air conditioning. Its exterior features stainless steel window frames paired with marble and limestone, intended to connect the building to Classical architecture. At 59th Street, Bloomingdale's expanded to encompass an entire city block in 1930, with the new addition featuring a black and gold facade festooned with decorative metal grilles. Additional notable Art Deco department stores across the city include the Sears Roebuck & Company Department Store in Flatbush, Brooklyn, and the Montgomery Ward Department Store in Jamaica, Queens.

Other major Art Deco commercial buildings in the city included hotels such as the Waldorf Astoria New York. The original building with that name had been demolished to make way for the Empire State Building, and the new building drew influence from it, designed more like a skyscraper than a traditional hotel. Architects Schultz & Weaver designed twin limestone and brick towers, and included a suite for the president and a private rail line from Grand Central. Apartment hotels flourished in this period as a way of enjoying luxurious living without the expense of maintaining a private home. The Essex House was at the time of its construction one of the city's largest apartment hotels. It features gilded frozen fountain motifs and floral patterns rising above its main entrance. Further uptown, the Carlyle Hotel combined two buildings (one an apartment house, the other the hotel) and drew influence from Westminster Cathedral, albeit with modern Art Deco touches; the facade is broken up with beige terra cotta stripes inscribed with geometric V's and plant forms.

=== Residential ===
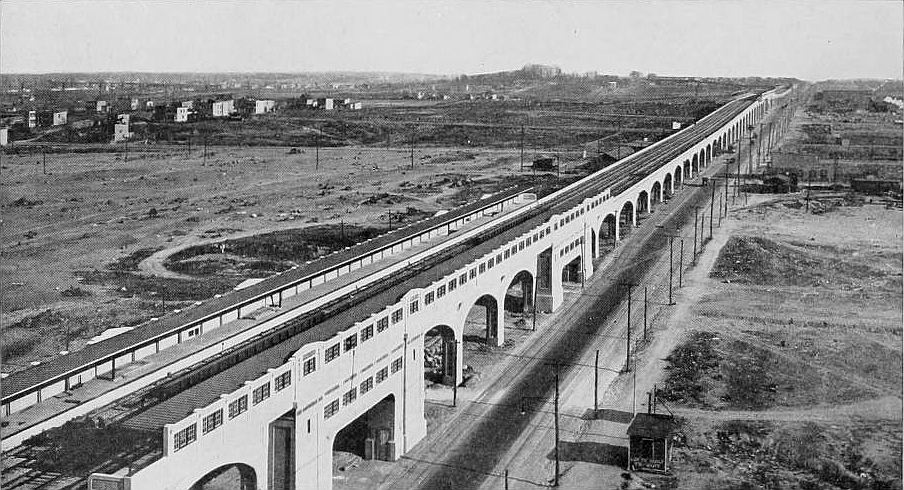
View of the new elevated Flushing subway line down Queens Boulevard in 1920: the arrival of the subway spurred a housing construction boom in the area.

Alongside the commercial boom of the 1920s, New York experienced a huge increase in residential construction; 20% of all new housing built in the US in that decade was built in New York. Apartment buildings grew from 39% of construction in 1919 to 77% in 1926. The Art Deco era paralleled New Yorkers' shift away from tenement-style housing (multifamily homes with shared facilities) and row houses, towards apartment buildings (single-family rooms with separate bathrooms). Developers began building apartments targeting the middle class. Urban Art Deco was a way of appealing to prospective renters and keep them in the city, rather than the suburbs. The growth of the subway drove new Art Deco architecture as well. Developers built new speculative housing in the undeveloped areas the new subway lines reached, and New York's population diffused outward. The great majority of these new apartments throughout the boroughs topped out at six stories, because building seven stories or taller required more expensive fireproof materials. The downturn in the housing market of the 1930s encouraged New Dealers to focus on nonprofit and limited-profit housing to renew blighted parts of the city or expand beyond its current limits. Examples of these limited-profit housing initiatives can be found throughout the boroughs, especially in Sunnyside, Queens. To save money, the middle-class Art Deco often used "cast stone" (concrete) instead of expensive carved stone, reusing molds to repeat designs and shapes.

In Manhattan, Art Deco apartments sprouted up across the borough. On the Upper East Side, Raymond Hood and John Mead Howells were commissioned to build a small apartment building in 1927 by the owner of the Daily News. Its ten floors features silver window spandrels with geometric designs and zigzags, and was awarded a medal by the American Institute of Architects for demonstrating a pioneering form of the new modern architectural style. One of the only known Art Deco townhouses was built nearby on East 80th Street as a residence for the banker Lionello Perera. Its modest brick facade is broken up by different patterns, with geometric stone bands separating stories and a decorative metal entrance. The residence was later owned by Art Deco collector Barbra Streisand, making it her largest piece.

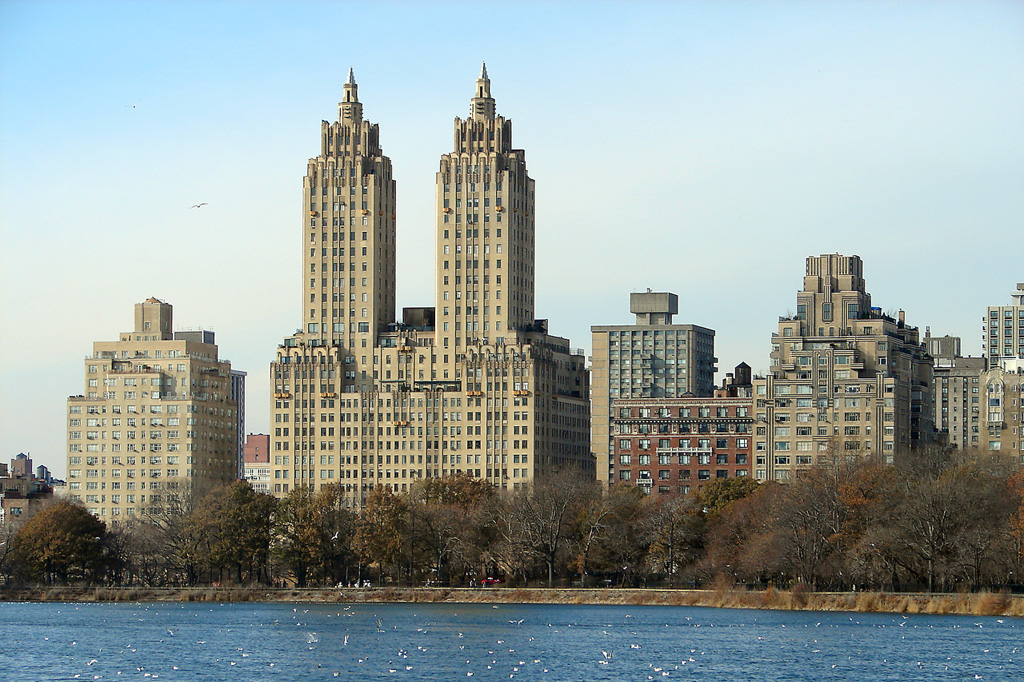
Skyline of Central Park West, showing a number of Art Deco buildings, including the twin-towered El Dorado

Across town, some of the first large apartment buildings to receive influence from the Art Deco office buildings and skyscrapers downtown were the sister buildings The Majestic and The Century. Together with The El Dorado, designed by Margon & Holder in association with Emery Roth, these twin-towered apartments transformed Central Park West's skyline. Roth generally avoided modernistic designs in his output (The San Remo and The Beresford in the same area were Italianate in style) but he contributed further Art Deco apartments in this part of town, including the Ardsley at 320 Central Park West. Towards the end of the 1930s more streamline moderne designs such as The Normandy (Roth again) and 10 West 74th Street (H. Herbert Lilien) had more subdued brick and horizontal speed lines. In northern Manhattan, Washington Heights filled with more modest Art Deco apartments, featuring amenities such as sunken living rooms, casement windows, and elevators.

In Brooklyn, apartments and homes in the 1920s and 30s filled the previously sparsely populated land from the island's terminal moraine down to the southern shore. Art Deco apartments and commercial buildings changed the character of new or developing neighborhoods. Ocean Avenue and stretches of Kings Highway filled with a number of Art Deco apartment houses, such as 832 Ocean Avenue, built in 1931 by prolific Brooklyn architects Kavy & Kavovitt. Clad in yellow brick, piers capped with cast stone emphasize verticality and evoke the skyscrapers in Manhattan. In Brighton Beach, the old hotels and racetracks of the area gave way to Art Deco apartments, including 711 Brightwater Court (1934), appointed with riotously colored terra cotta in jungle and geometric patterns.

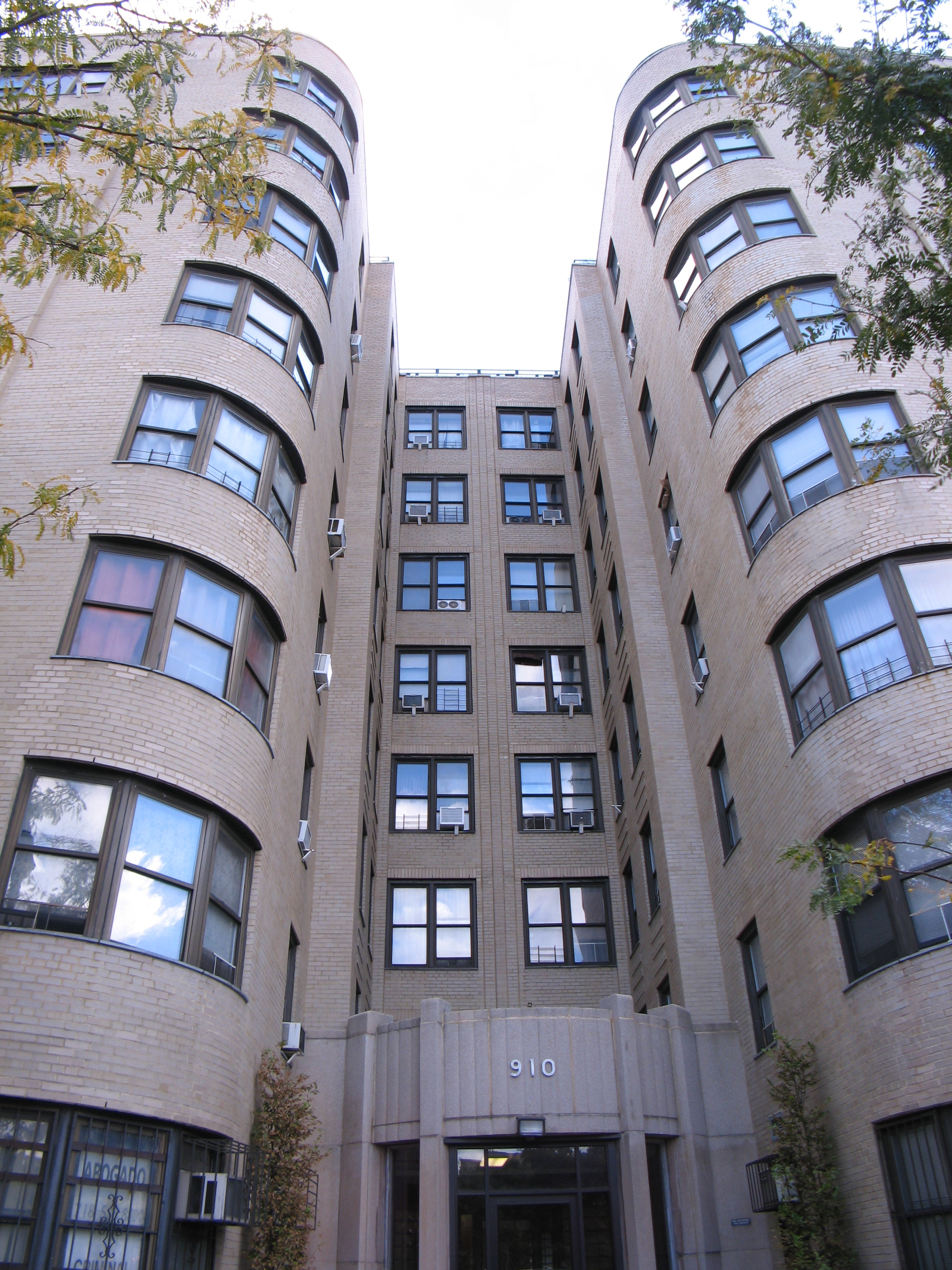
An Art Deco apartment building on the Grand Concourse, built 1937

The densest concentration of Art Deco buildings in New York is in the west Bronx centered along the Grand Concourse, with roughly 300 buildings constructed between 1935 and 1941. Many of the buildings share styles and architects with the apartment houses across the river in Washington Heights. One of the first, and grandest, Art Deco apartments along the Concourse was the Park Plaza Apartments, completed 1931. Intended to rise ten stories before being damaged by fire during construction, the final building is eight stories and decorated with bright polychromatic terra cotta. Park Plaza was the first Bronx Deco apartments by Horace Ginsbern & Associates, who helped change the face of the borough. These buildings featured Deco hallmarks of geometric patterns and colored brick, with indirectly lit public interiors floored with tile, framed with metal, and capped by mosaic ceilings. Private interiors featured sunken living rooms, wrap-around windows in the corners, and ample closet space; inside and out these apartments were designed to appeal to the fashion-conscious, "new money" middle class. Compared to the famous architects of Manhattan who often studied at prestigious schools, many of the architects of the Art Deco in the outer boroughs were Jewish, studied at local art schools, and were forgotten in a generation.

=== Public works ===
The pace of public works spending increased after World War I, and especially during the Depression. Mayor Fiorello H. La Guardia saw the Depression as an opportunity to remake the city, and spearheaded a bevy of public works projects. The city benefited greatly from Franklin Roosevelt's New Deal Works Progress Administration program, established to provide relief. In 1935 and 1936, the city alone received one-seventh of all WPA funds. The money went to projects such as a network of public pools across the city, with Crotona Park in the Bronx and Tompkinsville Pool in Staten Island being built with Art Deco flourishes.

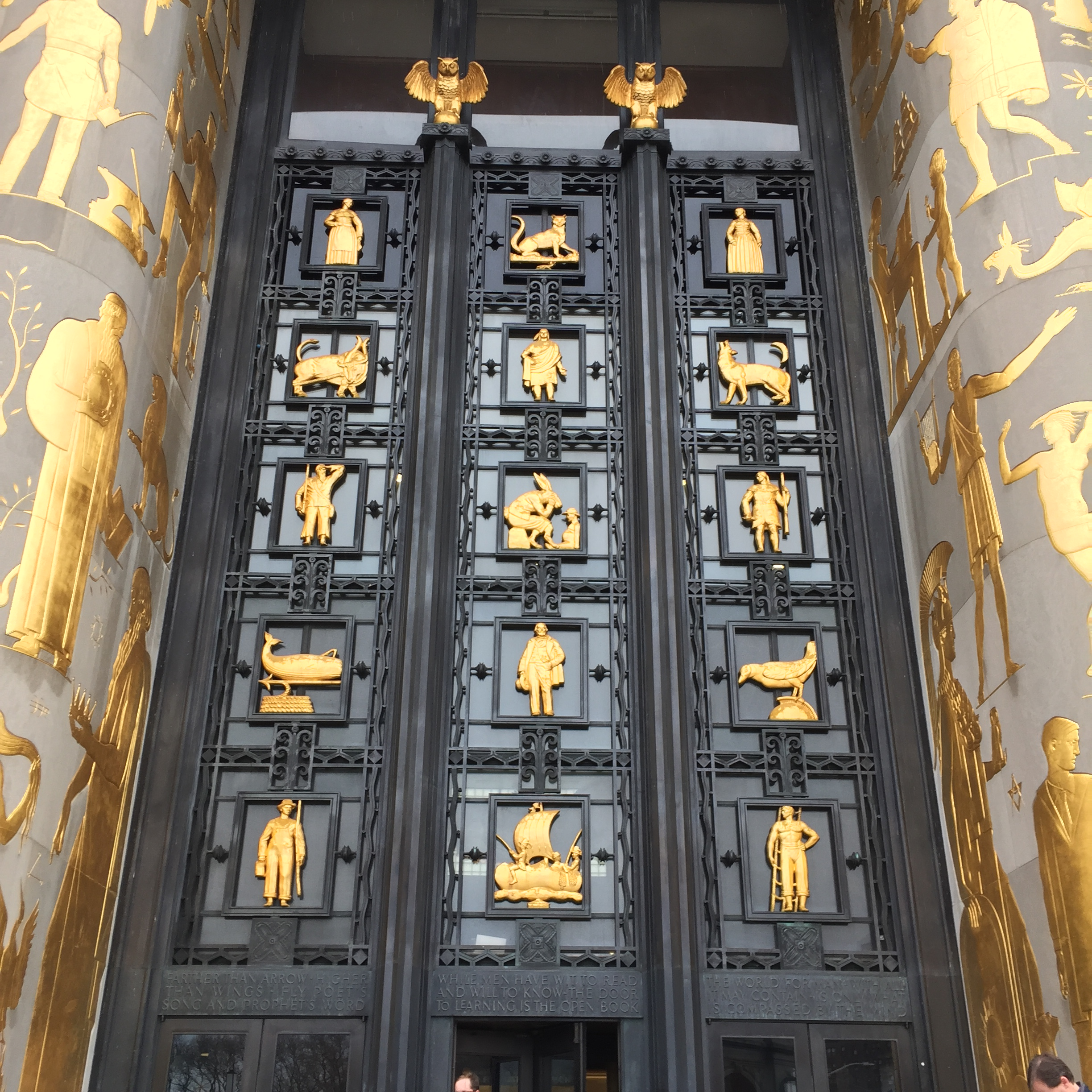
The entranceway to the Brooklyn Public Library's Central Library

Art Deco's influence affected many aspects of New York's public works during this period; by the late 1930s, most Art Deco buildings were municipal projects, not commercial ones. The Health Building at 125 Worth Street (c. 1932–1935) has metal grillwork and health-related designs around the entrances, designed by German craftsman Oscar Bruno Bach, who produced custom metalwork for the Chrysler and Empire State Buildings. Other Art Deco sanitation buildings include the Tallman Island Water Pollution Control Plant in Queens and the Manhattan Grit Chamber in East Harlem. Art Deco libraries from the period include the Central Library of the Brooklyn Public Library. Though construction began in 1911, by 1930 it was still incomplete. The Library hired new architects in 1935 that hewed to the original footprint, but discarded the Greco-Roman elements for a modern look. The resulting facade is sparsely ornamented, with the main decoration being 50-foot (15 m) pylons illustrating the arts and sciences with gilded images, flanking entry doors surrounded by gilded bronze reliefs of figures from American literature.

Art Deco is also represented in the city's transportation and mass transit networks. The Independent Subway System (IND) subway lines have stations designed from the late 1920s on. Squire J. Vickers, who worked on a myriad of New York City Subway stations, designed Art Deco edifices for stops such as the 181st Street station in Washington Heights, the Fourth Avenue station in Park Slope, the York Street station in Dumbo, and IND substations like that on West 53rd Street in Midtown. Other major Art Deco projects included the New York Municipal Airport, of which the Marine Air Terminal remains, and the ventilation tunnels and portals of the Lincoln Tunnel, which opened in 1937 and connect New Jersey and Manhattan.

The first Art Deco school in the city was Public School 98 in the Bronx, one of the first new schools built to establish a separate junior high school program in the city. Public School 98 was joined by Joan of Arc High School on the Upper West Side, one of the first buildings designed by Eric Kebbon, school buildings superintendent on the New York Board of Education who ultimately designed more than 100 schools for the city. The High School was designed more like a skyscraper than a traditional school building, with long brick piers rising up to accommodate two thousand students. The triple-height entranceway contains an inscription of the school's name and symbols from the story of Joan of Arc. Other schools include Samuel Gompers Industrial High School in the Bronx, and the former Public School 48 in Queens.

=== Religious structures ===
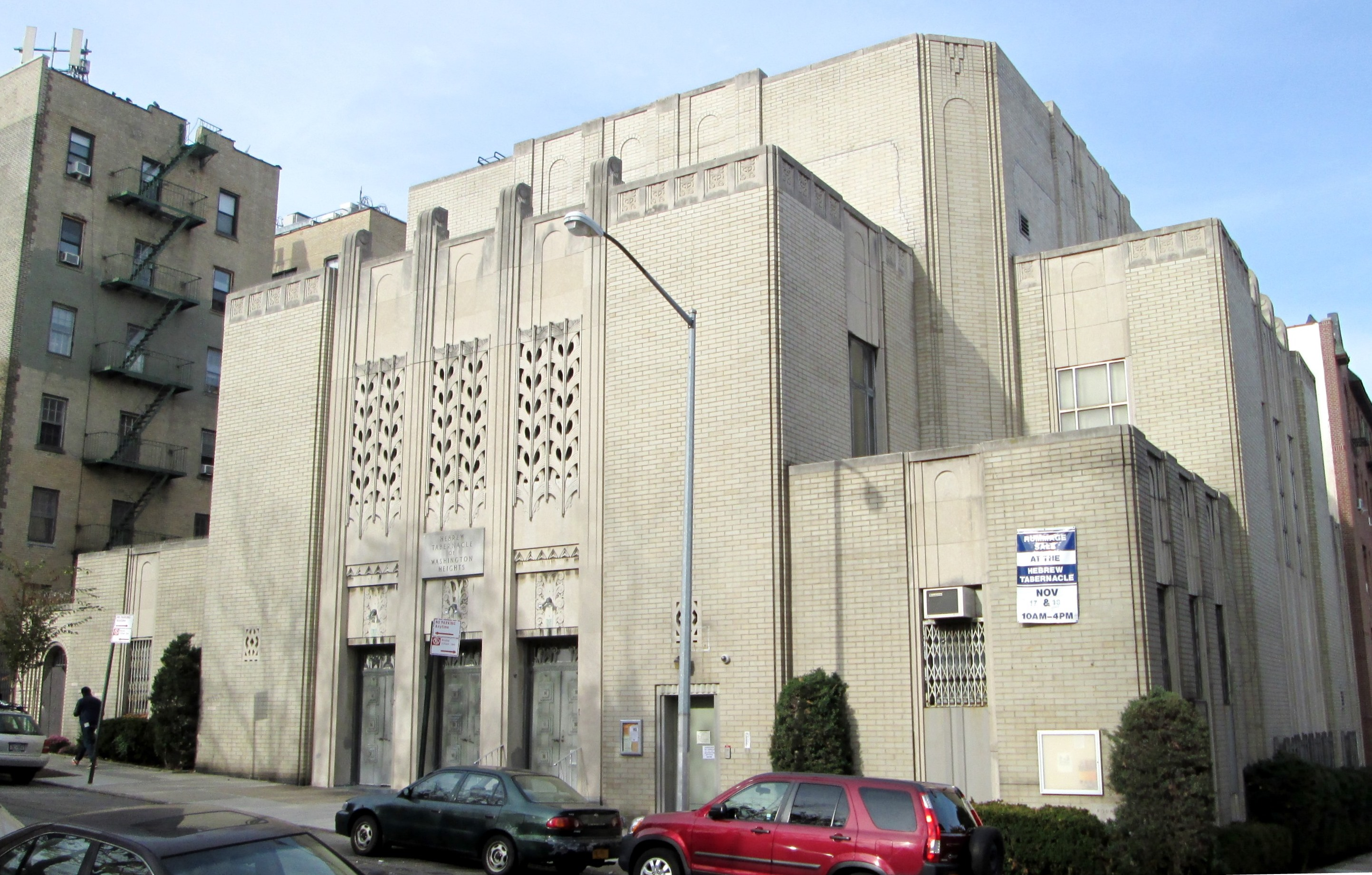
The Fourth Church of Christ, Scientist, now the Hebrew Tabernacle of Washington Heights

Few religious buildings in the Art Deco style were built in New York City; artist Don Vlack wrote that the architects may have felt confined to more traditional styles given their conservative congregations. The Church of the Heavenly Rest and St. Luke's Lutheran Church have Art Deco elements to their more traditional, neo-Gothic elements, while the Society for the Advancement of Judaism blends modern elements with traditional Jewish motifs rather than geometric forms, with some calling the result "Modern Semetic". The Fourth Church of Christ, Scientist (now a synagogue) is a rare example of Christian Science Art Deco anywhere in the country, while the Rego Park Synagogue provides a late example of an Art Deco synagogue. Other buildings include the Trinity Baptist Church and Temple Emanu-El of New York, both on the Upper East Side.

== Decline and legacy ==
A 1932 Museum of Modern Art architecture exhibit introduced the International Style to New Yorkers. Where Art Deco favored ornamentation, International Style favored undecorated facades; Bletter summed up International Style as "less is more", and Art Deco as "more than enough." International Style buildings, with their emphasis on airy glass and the horizontal, were now modern and exciting, while Art Deco became seen as outmoded and linked to the tough times of the Depression. The International Style and modernism replaced Art Deco as it fell out of favor during and after World War II; many smaller commercial buildings remodeled to fit the newest tastes.

Art Deco's role as the first international style, and its importance, were largely forgotten for decades. Art Deco was not reappraised and formally named and categorized until the 1960s. Writing in 1975, Cervin Robinson noted that by the standard of direct stylistic influence, Art Deco had virtually no impact on contemporary buildings—but by its impact on the character of New York itself, Art Deco "helped crystallize our image of Gotham." The style has inspired 21st-century construction in the city using Deco design details or building materials.

The downturn in New York City's fortunes in the latter half of the 20th century caused the damage and loss of many Art Deco buildings. Smaller commercial buildings and theaters were often completely lost, while by the 1970s few Deco skyscrapers still had intact lobbies. Horace Ginsbern's Noonan Plaza Apartments on the Grand Concourse suffered from heavy vandalism, with skylights ripped from frames to sell for scrap metal. It was eventually restored in the 1980s thanks to the efforts of Ginsbern's son and a new owner. The desirability of Art Deco objects has led buildings to be stripped of their ornamentation to be resold piecemeal.

The modern historical preservation movement in New York City was sparked by the loss of the old Penn Station in the 1960s, leading to the empowering of the New York City Landmarks Preservation Commission to protect historic buildings. Don Vlack considered the fact that no Art Deco buildings had been landmarked by 1974 an example of the lingering bias against the style. Some of the first Art Deco buildings protected were the Chrysler Building and Chanin Building in 1978. Some building owners fought some or all of the designation; General Electric successfully fought the interior landmark designation for the RCA Victory Building, and Radio City Music Hall's interiors were landmarked only after a contentious battle with the Music Hall's owners, who wished to demolish it. The Landmarks Commission received more than 100,000 signatures urging the landmark status.

Some Art Deco buildings were demolished before they were eligible for protection. For example, Donald Trump demolished the 12-story Bonwit Teller building at Fifth Avenue and 57th Street in 1980; the limestone reliefs Trump had promised to the Metropolitan Museum of Art were instead jackhammered and destroyed. Other Art Deco losses, such as the New Market Building in the South Street Seaport, were surrounded by landmarked districts but were not old enough to be initially included, and had landmarked status later denied. To avoid landmark status, landowners will sometimes rush to demolish the building or deface the facade. Given that interiors and exteriors of buildings are landmarked separately, even landmarked buildings can see their unique Deco features lost—such as the McGraw-Hill Building, whose unique streamlined metal and enamel lobby was destroyed in a 2021 renovation.

Groups such as the Art Deco Society of New York (ADSNY) produce talks and tours about the city's architecture, as well as advocating for the preservation of the city's remaining Deco. New York City Landmarks Commission veteran Anthony W. Robins wrote that decades after the rise and fall of Art Deco, the style "survives and flourishes" in New York. The once-daring buildings have become city historic landmarks, and new building projects draw influence from the style.

== Landmarked buildings ==
Below is a partial listing of landmarked Art Deco buildings within New York City. Items with a NYCL ID number are New York City designated landmarks. Items marked with a dagger (†) are also (or alternatively) listed on the National Register of Historic Places, those with a double dagger (‡) have landmarked interiors, and those with a section sign (§) are National Historic Landmarks.

Borough	Address	Name	Constructed	Landmark Date	Reference	Registry ID
Bronx	1005 Jerome Avenue	Park Plaza Apartments †	1929–1931	1981		NYCL #1077
Bronx	1619 Boston Road	Herman Ridder Junior High School	1929–1931	1990		NYCL #1628
Bronx	105–149 West 168th Street	Noonan Plaza Apartments	1931	2010		NYCL #2400
Bronx	455 Southern Boulevard	Samuel Gompers Industrial High School	1931–1932	2023		NYCL #2666
Bronx	West 205th Street	Concourse Yard Bldgs. †	1933	2006 (NRHP)		NRHP #06000013
Bronx	1700 Fulton Avenue	Crotona Play Center † ‡	1934–1936	2007 (NYCL); 2015 (NRHP)		NRHP #15000177, NYCL #2232 (exterior), NYCL #2233 (interior)
Brooklyn	Grand Army Plaza	Brooklyn Central Library †	1911–1940	1997 (NYCL); 2002 (NRHP)		NRHP #01001446, NYCL #1963
Brooklyn	47–61 Greenpoint Avenue	Eberhard Faber Pencil Factory	1923–1924	2007		NYCL #2264 (Historic District)
Brooklyn	450 Fulton Street	A. I. Namm & Son Department Store	1924–25; 1928–29	2005		NYCL #2170
Brooklyn	97–105 Willoughby Street	Former New York Telephone Company Headquarters	1929–1930	2004		NYCL #2144
Brooklyn	185 Montague Street	National Title Guaranty Company Building	1929–1930	2017		NYCL #2587
Brooklyn	580 and 582–584 Myrtle Avenue	M. H. Renken Dairy Company Office Building and Engine Room Building	1932	2015		NYCL #2519
Brooklyn	2307 Beverley Road	Sears Roebuck & Company Department Store	1932–1940	2012		NYCL #2469
Brooklyn	4200 Fifth Avenue	Sunset Park Play Center ‡	1936	2007		NYCL #2242 (exterior), NYCL #2243 (interior)
Manhattan	140 West Street	Barclay–Vesey Building (New York Telephone Company Building) † ‡	1923–1927	1991 (NYC); 2009 (NRHP)		NRHP #09000257, NYCL #1745 (exterior), NYCL #1746 (interior)
Manhattan	420 Lexington Avenue	Graybar Building	1925–1927	2016		NYCL #2554
Manhattan	551 Fifth Avenue	Fred F. French Building † ‡	1926–1927	1986 (NYC); 2004 (NRHP)		NRHP #03001514, NYCL #1415 (exterior), NYCL #1416 (exterior)
Manhattan	2 Park Avenue	2 Park Avenue	1926–1928	2006		NYCL #2186
Manhattan	122 East 42nd Street	Chanin Building †	1927–1929	1978		NYCL #993
Manhattan	593-599 Madison Avenue	Fuller Building ‡	1928–1929	1986 (NYC)		NYCL #1460 (exterior); NYCL #1461 (interior)
Manhattan	310-312 Riverside Drive	Master Building †	1928–1929	1989 (NYC); 2016 (NRHP)		NRHP #16000036, NYCL #1661
Manhattan	511 Lexington Avenue	Lexington Hotel	1928–1929	2016		NYCL #2559
Manhattan	405 Lexington Avenue	Chrysler Building § ‡	1928–1930	1978		NRHP #76001237, NYCL #992 (exterior), NYCL #996 (interior)
Manhattan	120–130 West 14th Street	The Salvation Army National and Territorial Headquarters	1929	2017		NYCL #2565
Manhattan	20 West Street	Downtown Athletic Club	1929–1930	1999		NYCL #2075
Manhattan	350 Fifth Avenue	Empire State Building § ‡	1929–1931	1981 (NYC); 1986 (NHL)		NRHP #82001192, NYCL #2000 (exterior), NYCL #2001 (interior)
Manhattan	570 Lexington Avenue	General Electric Building †	1929–1931	1985 (NYC); 2004 (NRHP)		NRHP #03001515, NYCL #1412
Manhattan	300 Central Park West	Eldorado Apartments	1929–1931	1985		NYCL #1521
Manhattan	301 Park Avenue	Waldorf Astoria New York ‡	1929–1931	1993 / ‡2017		NYCL #1812 (exterior), NYCL #2591 (interior)
Manhattan	32 6th Avenue	The Long Lines Building	1911–1932	1990		NYCL #1747 (exterior), NYCL #1748 (interior)
Manhattan	630 Ninth Avenue	Film Center Building † ‡	1928–1929	1982 (NYC); 1984 (NRHP)		NRHP #84002768, NYCL #1220
Manhattan	49 East 80th Street	49 East 80th Street †	1930	2007 (NRHP)		NRHP #07001193
Manhattan	60 Hudson Street	Western Union Building ‡	1928–1930	1990		NYCL #1749 (exterior), NYCL #1750 (interior)
Manhattan	220 East 42nd Street	Daily News Building † ‡	1928–1930	1981/ ‡1998 (NYC); 1989 (NHL)		NRHP #82001191, NYCL #1049 (exterior), NYCL #1982 (interior)
Manhattan	33-43 West 61st Street	Kent Automatic Parking Garage †	1929–1930	1983 (NYC); 1984 (NRHP)		NRHP #84002801; NYCL #1239
Manhattan	1 Wall Street	Irving Trust Company Building ‡	1929–1931	2001/ ‡2024		NYCL #2029 (exterior), NYCL #2679 (interior)
Manhattan	500–506 Fifth Avenue	500 Fifth Avenue	1929–1931	2010		NYCL #2427
Manhattan	228 East Broadway	Bialystoker Center and Home for the Aged	1929–1931	2013		NYCL #2529
Manhattan	2701–2714 Broadway	Horn & Hardart Automat Cafeteria Building	1930	2006		NYCL #2192
Manhattan	330 West 42nd Street	McGraw-Hill Building §	1930–1931	1979 (NYC); 1989 (NHL)		NRHP #80002701, NYCL #1050
Manhattan	115 Central Park West	Majestic Apartments	1930–1931	1988		NYCL #1518
Manhattan	1619 Broadway	Brill Building	1930–1931	2010		NYCL #2387
Manhattan	86 Trinity Place	New York Curb Exchange §	1930–1931	1978 (NHL); 2012 (NYC)		NRHP #78001867, NYCL #2515
Manhattan	608 Fifth Avenue	Goelet (Swiss Center) Building ‡	1930–1932	1992		NYCL #1810 (exterior), NYCL #1811 (interior)
Manhattan	70 Pine Street	Cities Service Building ‡	1930–1932	2011		NYCL #2441 (exterior), NYCL #2442 (interior)
Manhattan	25 Central Park West	Century Apartments	1931	1985		NYCL #1517
Manhattan	22 East 40th Street (273–277 Madison Avenue)	275 Madison Avenue Building	1931	2009		NYCL #2286
Manhattan	126 West 53rd Street	Central IND Substation †	1932	2006		NRHP #06000019
Manhattan	99 John Street	Insurance Company of North America Building †	1932	1999		NRHP #99001425
Manhattan	1260 6th Avenue	Radio City Music Hall † ‡	1932	1978		NRHP #78001880, NYCL #995
Manhattan	Between 5th and 6th Aves, between 48th and 51st Sts	Rockefeller Center §	1932–1933 (RCA/GE Building)	1985 (NYC); 1987 (NHL)		NYCL #1446
Manhattan	2624-2626 Broadway	Midtown Theater (Metro Theater)	1932–1933	1989		NYCL #1710
Manhattan	2366 Fifth Avenue	369th Regiment Armory †	1933	1985 (NYC); 1993 (NRHP)		NRHP #93001537, NYCL #1390
Queens	90-04 161st Street	(Former) Suffolk Title and Guarantee Company Building	1929	2001		NYCL #2088
Queens	162-24 Jamaica Avenue	Former J. Kurtz & Sons Store Building	1931	1981		NYCL #1132
Queens	90-33 160th Street	La Casina †	1933	1990 (NRHP); 1996 (NYC)		NRHP #89002259, NYCL #1940
Queens	24-02 to 24-36 19th Street	Astoria Park Pool and Play Center	1936	2006		NYCL #2196
Queens	155-02 108th Avenue	Public School 48 (now P75Q, The Robert E. Peary School)	1936	2020		NYCL #2646
Queens	146-21 Jamaica Avenue	Jamaica Savings Bank (Sutphin Boulevard)	1938–1939	2010		NYCL #2393
Queens	107-55 Queens Boulevard	Ridgewood Savings Bank (Forest Hills)	1939	2000		NYCL #2066
Queens	La Guardia Airport (Terminal A)	Marine Air Terminal † ‡	1939–40	1980 (NYC); 1982 (NRHP)		NRHP #82003397, NYCL #1109 (exterior), NYCL #1110 (interior)
Staten Island	6 Victory Boulevard	Lyons Pool Recreation Center ‡	1934–1936	2008		NYCL #2234 (exterior), NYCL #2235 (interior)
Staten Island	168 New Dorp Lane	Lane Theater (interior) ‡	1937–1938	1988		NYCL #1696

== See also ==
- List of Art Deco architecture in New York (state)
