= Noonan Plaza Apartments =

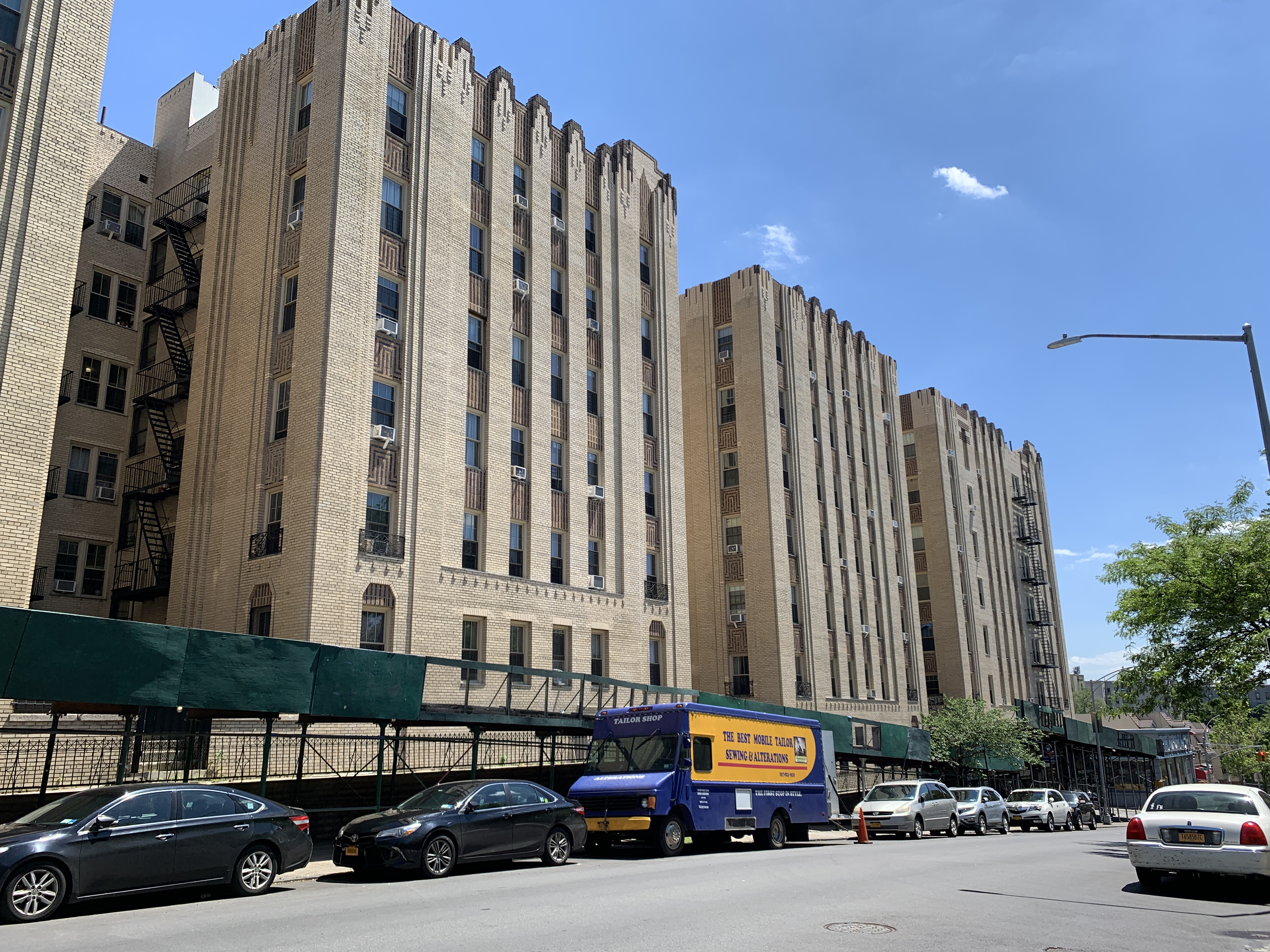

- Location within New York City Location within New York Location within the United States
- 40°50′18″N 73°55′30″W
- Location: 139 West 168th Street; Highbridge, Bronx, New York City

History
- Built: 1931

Site notes
- Architectural style: Art Deco
- Governing body: Private

New York City Landmark
- Designated: June 22, 2010
- Reference no.: 2400

The Noonan Plaza Apartments are an eight-story Art Deco apartment complex in the Highbridge neighborhood of the Bronx in New York City. Built in 1931 by Horace Ginsbern & Associates, with exteriors by Marvin Fine, the building forms part of the rich tapestry of Art Deco apartments in the West Bronx. It was made a New York City designated landmark in 2010.

== Description ==
The Noonan Plaza Apartments is a 300-dwelling, garden apartment that occupies much of the book bounded by West 168th Street and Ogden and Nelson Avenues. It rises between six and eight stories, with facades on three sides and a central 15,000-square-foot courtyard garden bounded by a one-story arcade at the corner of Nelson and 168th.

== History ==
In the 1920s, the population of New York grew substantially, with migration from the crowded environs of Manhattan to the outer boroughs. Jews, in particular, eagerly decamped from crowded tenement ghettos to new, modern housing that was being built in locations such as the West Bronx, centered along the Grand Concourse. Horace Ginsbern and his company, Ginsbern & Associates, collaborated with Marvin Fine on a number of apartment buildings in the Bronx.

Fine had been inspired by watching the Art Deco skyscrapers going up from Ginsbern & Associates' Midtown Manhattan offices, and was inspired to use the Daily News Building's multicolored brick as the firm's trademark in the Bronx. Ginsbern and Fine built one of the earliest Art Deco apartment buildings in the Bronx at 1005 Jerome Avenue, the Park Plaza Apartments, from 1929–1931.

Ginsbern's work on Park Plaza impressed Bernard Noonan, an Irish developer who was building housing in the Bronx, and he recruited them to build a much larger version of those apartments, to be called "Noonan Plaza". Noonan intended the Plaza to be the apotheosis of design and craftsmanship of his building.

== See also ==
- Art Deco architecture of New York City
- List of New York City Designated Landmarks in the Bronx
