= Jamaica Savings Bank Building (Sutphin Boulevard) =

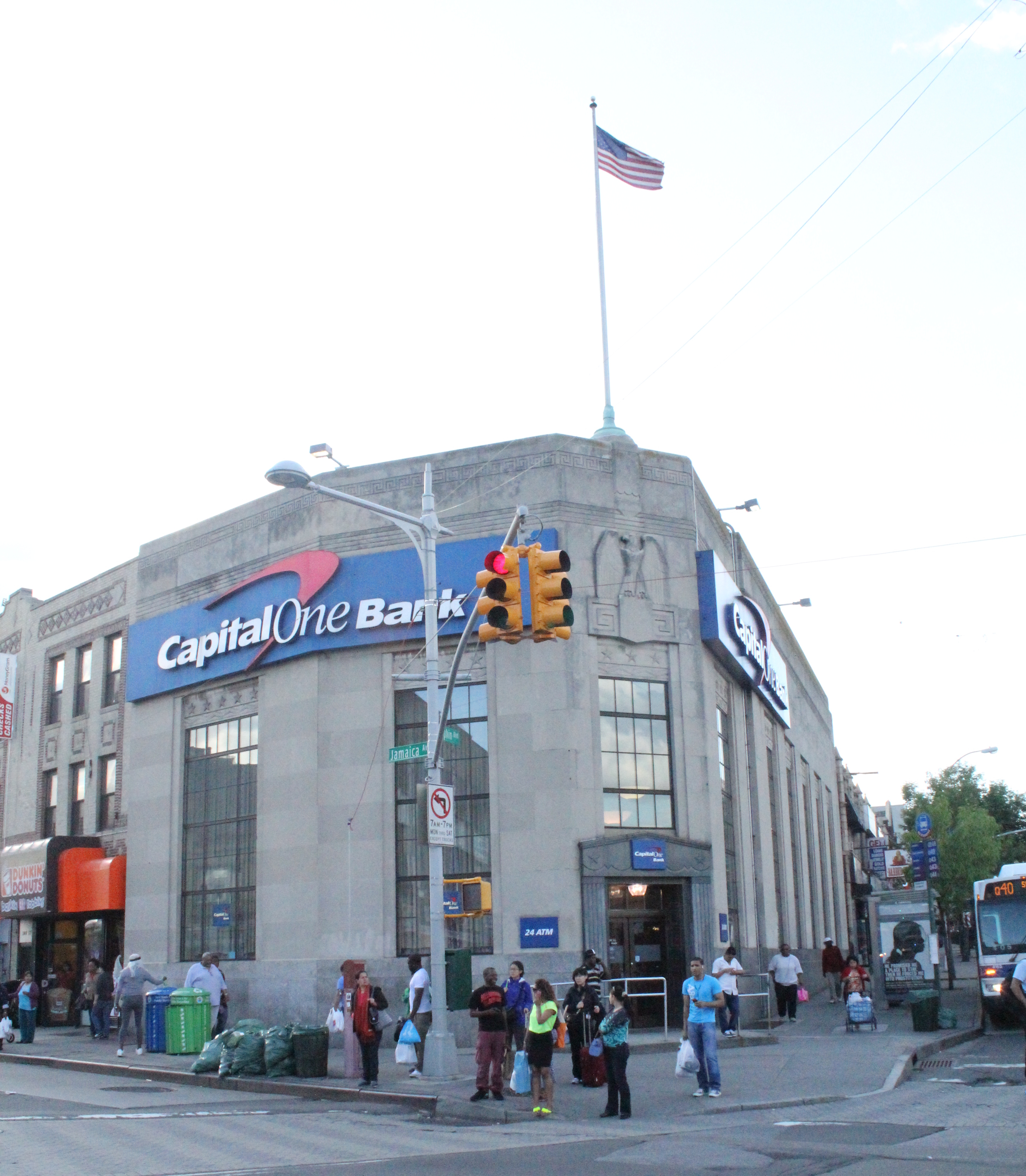
- Jamaica Savings Bank Building in 2014

General information
- Address: 146-21 Jamaica Avenue; Jamaica, New York
- Coordinates: 40°42′07″N 73°48′30″W
- Opened: April 22, 1939

Design and construction
- Architect(s): Morrell Smith
- Main contractor: Theodore L. Rubsamen and Company

New York City Landmark
- Designated: October 26, 2010
- Reference no.: 2393

The Jamaica Savings Bank is a building at Jamaica Avenue and Sutphin Boulevard in Jamaica, Queens, New York City. The building was built between 1938 and 1939 in the Art Deco style. It replaced the Queensboro Savings Bank at 90-55 Sutphin Boulevard, which was acquired by the Jamaica Savings Bank in 1934 and demolished in 1938. The address was changed to the current 146-21 Jamaica Avenue and is a New York City designated landmark.

== Context ==
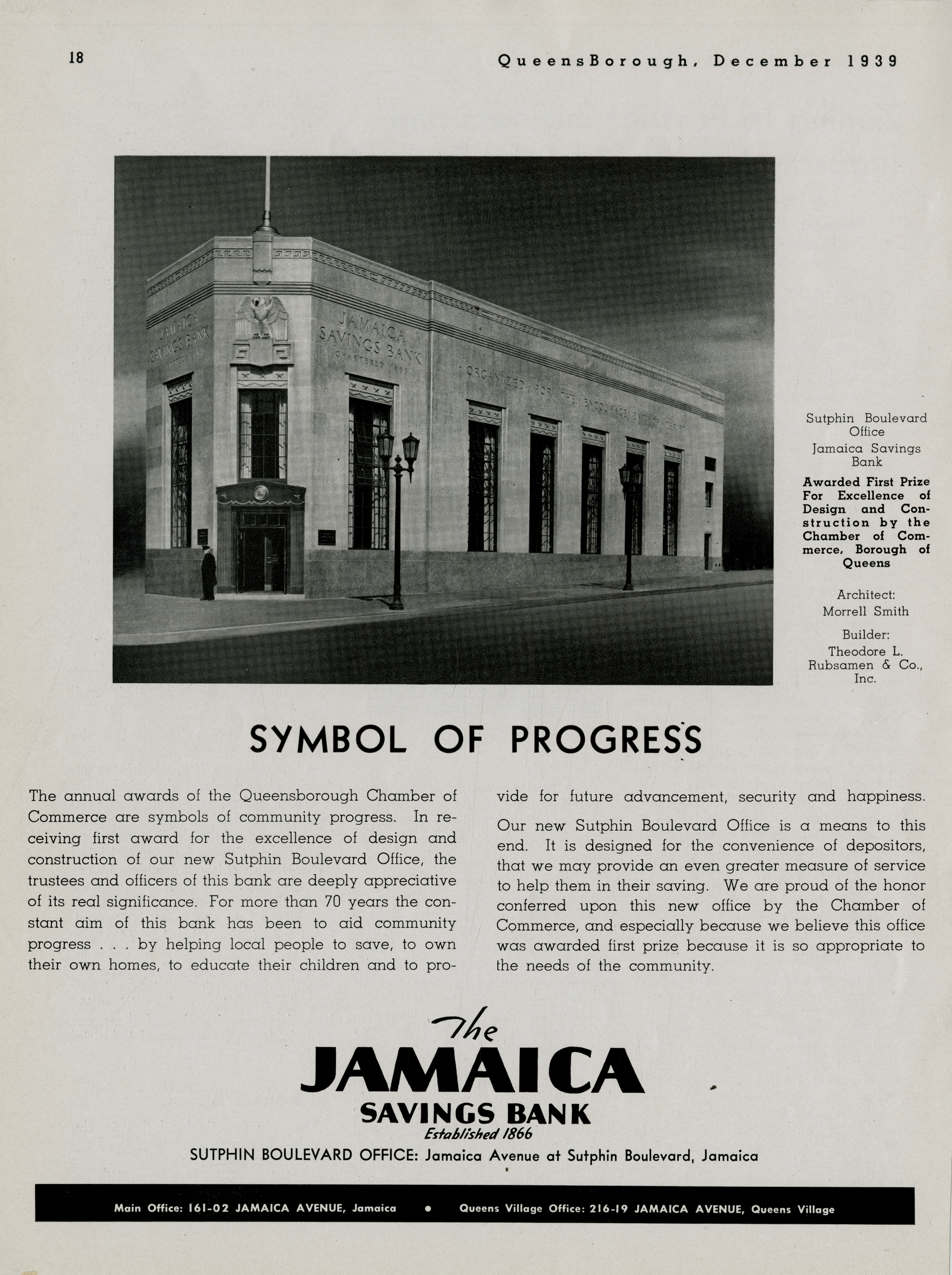
Advertisement for the Jamaica Savings Bank, Sutphin Boulevard Branch

With the advent of the railroad and other transportation systems, Jamaica quickly developed into the economical and commercial hub of Queens County throughout the early-twentieth century. To fulfill the economic needs of Jamaica's rapidly expanding population, the President of the Jamaica Savings Bank, George S. Downing, felt that the creation of more bank branches was necessary. In December 1934, the Queensboro Savings Bank (located at 90-55 Sutphin Boulevard) was merged with the Jamaica Savings Bank. As a result, the Queensboro Savings Bank was henceforth known as the Jamaica Savings Bank; the bank with the 161-02 Jamaica Avenue address became the Main Office of the company and the Sutphin Boulevard address served as the Branch Office. The employees of the Queensboro Savings Bank all retained their positions but were then considered employees of the Jamaica Savings Bank.

In 1934, Jamaica Savings Bank had a total of 50,614 accountants and was listed as fifty-seventh among the 100 largest savings banks in the United States. The officers of the Jamaica Savings Bank at that time were George S. Downing, president; Supreme Court Justice Leander B. Faber, Robert W. Higbie and George K. Meynen, vice-presidents; Charles R. Doughty, treasurer; G. Warren Smith, secretary, and Richard W. Reeves, assistant secretary.

== Construction ==
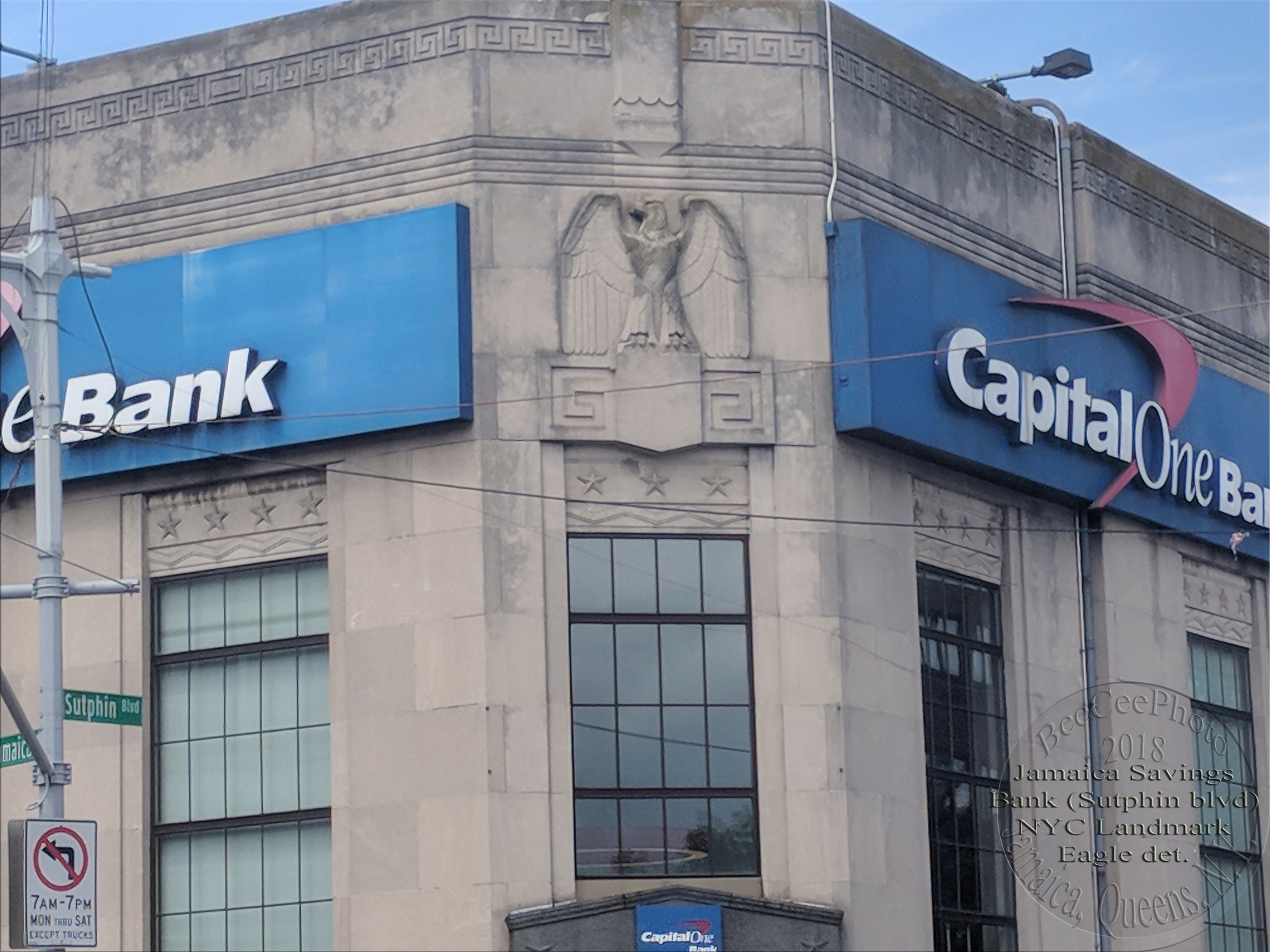
Detail of eagle over doorway

On August 27, 1938, George S. Downing announced that the construction of the second Jamaica Savings Bank branch was underway and was expected to be completed on February 1, 1939. Downing stated that the "decision to construct the building had been precipitated by the rapid grown of the Jamaica area" and that the "extension of the Eighth Avenue subway line to Jamaica had resulted in a 'phenomenal growth of apartments' in that section."

The Sutphin Boulevard Branch of the Jamaica Savings Bank officially opened on April 22, 1939 and was designed by Architect Morrell Smith of 475 Fifth Avenue and Builder/General Contractor Theodore L. Rubsamen and Company of Jamaica. This unique art deco building featured striking decorative features; its most notable feature being the American eagle carved in a low relief and placed over the entrance. "Ornamental cast bronze doors grace the entrance which opens upon a semicircular vestibule lined with marble of black and gold...Furnishings in American walnut, bronze lighting fixtures...and carpets of and draperies of harmonious design and hue complete the interior. Cladded with Indiana limestone and featuring a polished granite base, the longer frontage on the Sutphin Boulevard side hosts an emergency exit. Tall rectangular windows on the façade and a stylized Greek relief provides a motif to the building centered on the eagle above the entrance. There is an ornamental bronze doorway and windows are slightly recessed, there are spandrel panels at the tops that have stars and a geometric design in bas relief. A flagpole stands out on the roof which was part of the architects vision.

== Mural ==
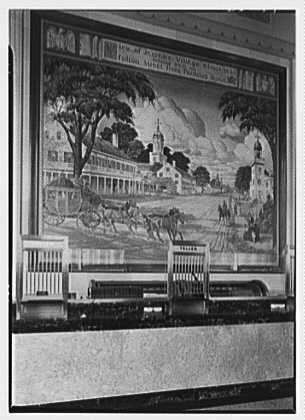
Mural

The interior western wall featured a 16'x25' mural of 19th century Fulton Street with a stagecoach and wide street that was removed by Capital One Bank in 2011.

== New York City Landmark ==
The legacy of the Jamaica Savings Bank lasted for nearly a century until the bank was acquired by North Fork Bank in 1999, which itself was acquired by Capital One Bank in 2008. At the time, the bank served the New York City metropolitan area with over 350 branches and around $60 billion in assets. As of this writing, the Sutphin Boulevard branch of the Jamaica Savings Bank building is a Capital One Bank branch. The main office Jamaica Savings Bank building was listed on the National Register of Historic Places in 1983, and a New York City Landmark in 2008. The second branch building on Sutphin Boulevard was dedicated as a New York City Landmark in 2010.

== See also ==
- Art Deco architecture of New York City
