= Jamaica Savings Bank =

Historic commercial building in Queens, New York

- U.S. National Register of Historic Places
- New York City Landmark
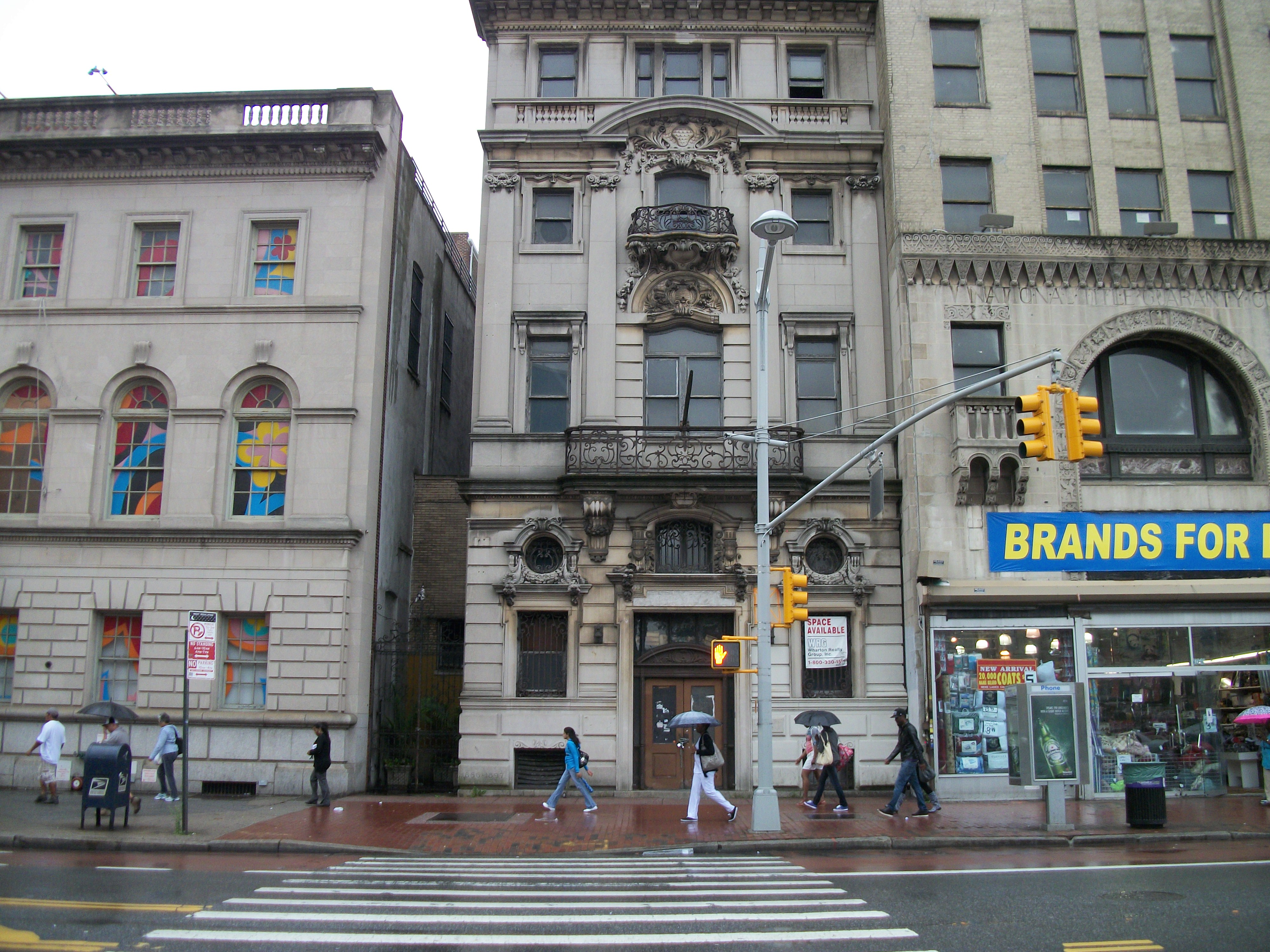
- The old Jamaica Savings Bank Building as seen from the northeast corner of Jamaica Avenue and 161st Street.

- Location within New York City
- Location: 161-02 Jamaica Avenue, Jamaica, New York
- Coordinates: 40°42′13″N 73°47′55″W
- Built: 1897
- Architects: William C. Hough; Edgar Deuell Jr.
- Architectural style: Beaux Arts
- NRHP reference No.: 83001774
- NYCL No.: 2109

Significant dates
- Added to NRHP: May 19, 1983
- Designated NYCL: February 12, 2008

The Jamaica Savings Bank was a bank incorporated in 1866 in the Jamaica section of the borough of Queens in New York City. It had four branches across Queens before it was acquired by North Fork Bank in 1999, which itself was acquired by Capital One Bank in 2008.

The bank's original building was built between 1897 and 1898 in the Beaux-Arts style. It is a slender, four-story brick building with a limestone facade. It features a deeply rusticated ground floor with windows protected by elegant metal grilles. The facade is framed by double-story pilasters and covered with elaborate carved brackets, swags and other elements.

== History ==
=== Incorporation ===
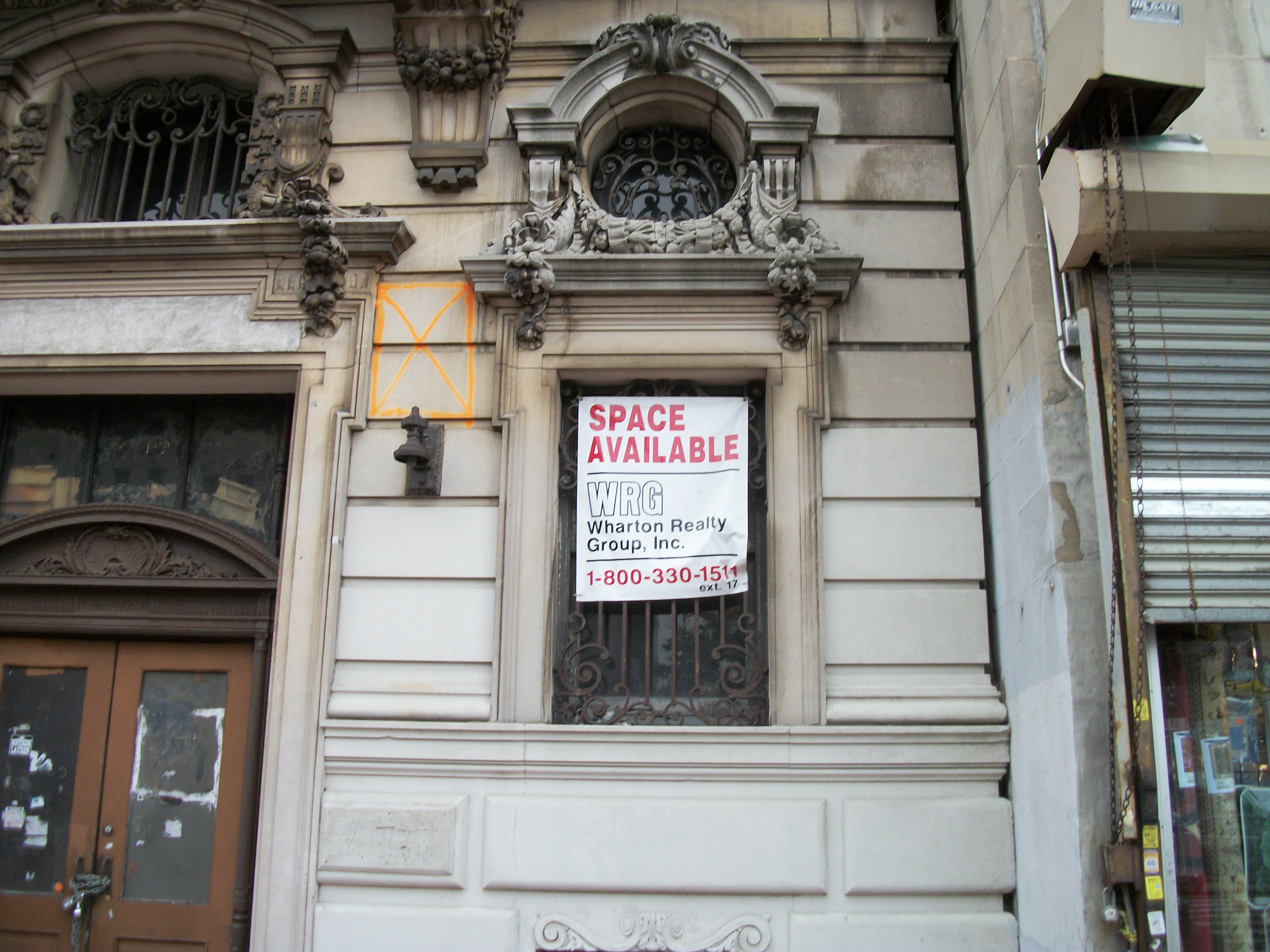
Old Jamaica Savings Bank Building; 2013 Owners

The original Jamaica Savings Bank was incorporated on April 20, 1866, by 19 local business leaders, including John Alsop King, governor of New York (1857-1858); Morris Fosdick, and Colonel Aaron A. Degrauw, who met in the Jamaica Town Hall in an effort to "pool their local resources for the purpose of protecting their savings and financing future development" of the Jamaica area. The bank officially opened to the public on July 14, 1866, at 161-02 Jamaica Avenue —a year after the civil war—and operated out of the Queens County Clerk's office with 15 customers depositing a total of $2,675.00. To supplement the ever-expanding community of Jamaica, the bank trustees hired the architectural firm of Hough and Deuell to build the new Beaux-Arts style bank headquarters that became flagship building of the Jamaica Savings Bank in 1898. "This building conveyed the kind of monumentality that is often associated with private social clubs and civic institutions."

=== Jamaica grows ===
With the advent of the railroad and other transportation systems, Jamaica quickly developed into the economical and commercial hub of Queens County throughout the early-twentieth century. To fulfill the economic needs of Jamaica's rapidly expanding population, the President of the Jamaica Savings Bank, George S. Downing, felt that the creation of more bank branches was necessary. In December 1934, the Queensboro Savings Bank (located at 90-55 Sutphin Boulevard) was merged with the Jamaica Savings Bank. As a result, the Queensboro Savings Bank was henceforth known as the Jamaica Savings Bank; the bank with the Jamaica Avenue address became the Main Office of the company and the Sutphin Boulevard address served as the Branch Office. The employees of the Queensboro Savings Bank all retained their positions but were then considered employees of the Jamaica Savings Bank.

In 1934, Jamaica Savings Bank had a total of 50,614 accountants and was listed as fifty-seventh among the 100 largest savings banks in the United States. The officers of the Jamaica Savings Bank at that time were George S. Downing, president; Supreme Court Justice Leander B. Faber, Robert W. Higbie and George K. Meynen, vice-presidents; Charles R. Doughty, treasurer; G. Warren Smith, secretary, and Richard W. Reeves, assistant secretary.

On August 27, 1938, George S. Downing announced that the construction of the second Jamaica Savings Bank branch was underway and was expected to be completed on February 1, 1939. Downing stated that the "decision to construct the building had been precipitated by the rapid grown of the Jamaica area" and that the "extension of the Eighth Avenue subway line to Jamaica had resulted in a 'phenomenal growth of apartments' in that section." The Sutphin Boulevard Branch of the Jamaica Savings Bank officially opened on April 22, 1939, and was designed by Architect Morrell Smith of 475 Fifth Avenue and Builder/General Contractor Theodore L. Rubsamen and Company of Jamaica. This unique art deco building featured striking decorative features; its most notable feature being the American eagle carved in a low relief and placed over the entrance. "Ornamental cast bronze doors grace the entrance which opens upon a semicircular vestibule lined with marble of black and gold...Furnishings in American walnut, bronze lighting fixtures...and carpets of and draperies of harmonious design and hue complete the interior.

=== Late 20th century ===
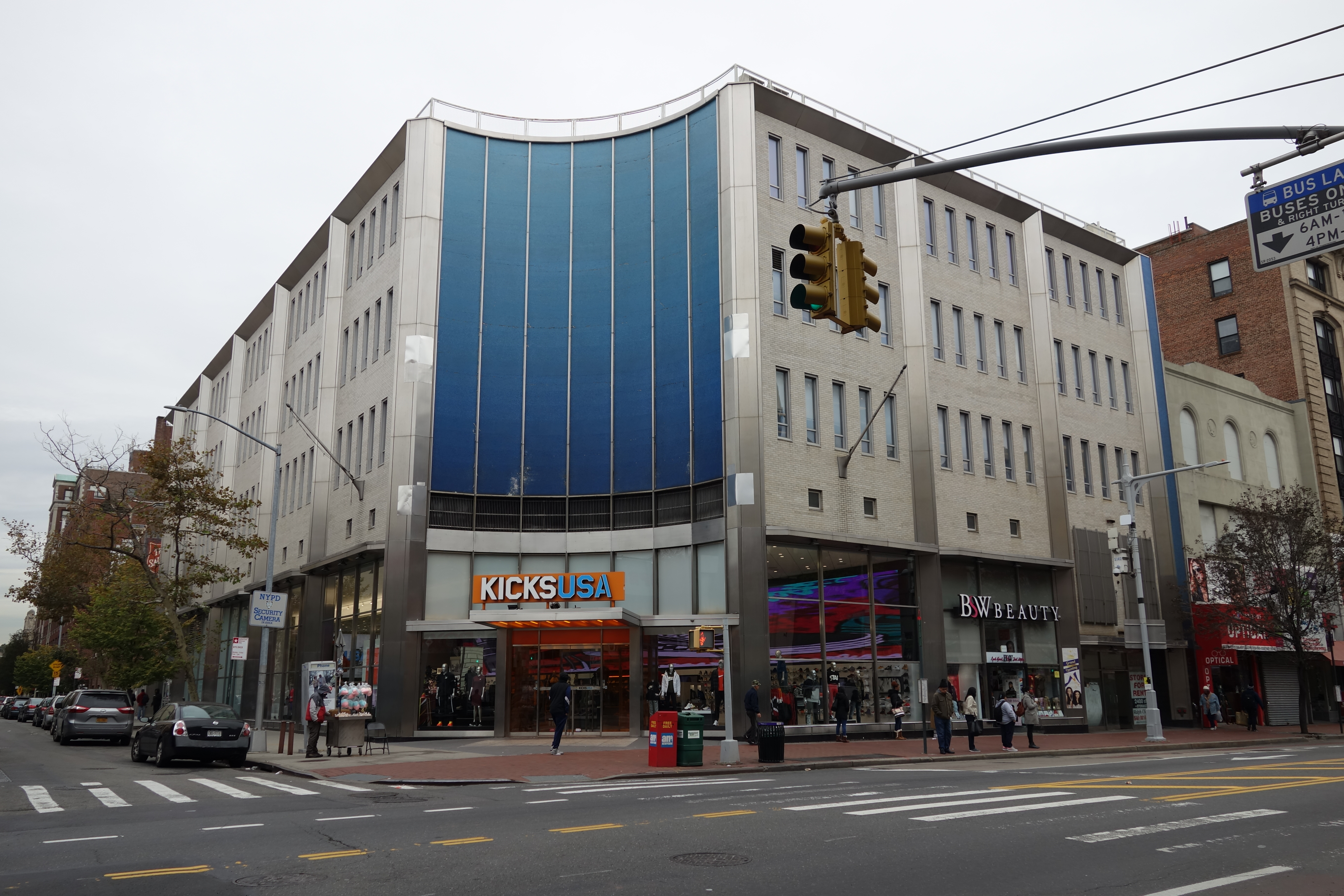
The 1964-built building at 161st Street.

The modern Jamaica Savings Bank of 1964 is on the corner of 161st Street in downtown Jamaica just across from its Victorian predecessor. Constructed as the new headquarters, the bank built a modernistic steel blue facade with a curved wall of blue Venetian glass. The concave entrance continues the accents and it was given an annual architectural award for commercial buildings for innovation by the Queens Chamber of Commerce. The award cites the fireproofing materials of gray glazed enamel brick, incorporation of stainless steel columns, and the exterior blue mosaic panels. The building interior had a wrap-around interior mural 162 ft x 11 ft depicting themes of historic Jamaica that included Captain Kidd, the Muscogee Native American tribe and Revolutionary War General Nathaniel Woodhull. The fourth branch was built during 1966-1968 at a 56th Avenue and Queens Boulevard in Elmhurst, next to the Queens Place Mall. The New York City Landmarks Preservation Commission designated the building as a landmark on June 28, 2005 (designation number LP-2173), but the full council voted the designation down on October 20, 2005.

== Legacy ==
The legacy of the Jamaica Savings Bank lasted for nearly a century until the bank was acquired by North Fork Bank in 1999, which itself was acquired by Capital One Bank in 2008. The Sutphin Boulevard branch of the Jamaica Savings Bank building is a Capital One Bank branch. The original Jamaica Savings Bank building was listed on the National Register of Historic Places in 1983, and a New York City Landmark in 2008. The second branch building on Sutphin Boulevard was dedicated as a New York City Landmark in 2010. The third building has closed and a sneaker company resides inside, the mural is no longer visible. The Queens Boulevard building with an elongated-saddle roof, built in 1966–1968, houses a Bank of America branch.

== See also ==
- Jamaica Savings Bank Building (Sutphin Boulevard)
- List of New York City Designated Landmarks in Queens
- National Register of Historic Places listings in Queens County, New York
