= Samuel Gompers High School =

Defunct public school in Bronx, New York

Coordinates: 40°48′37″N 73°54′27″W

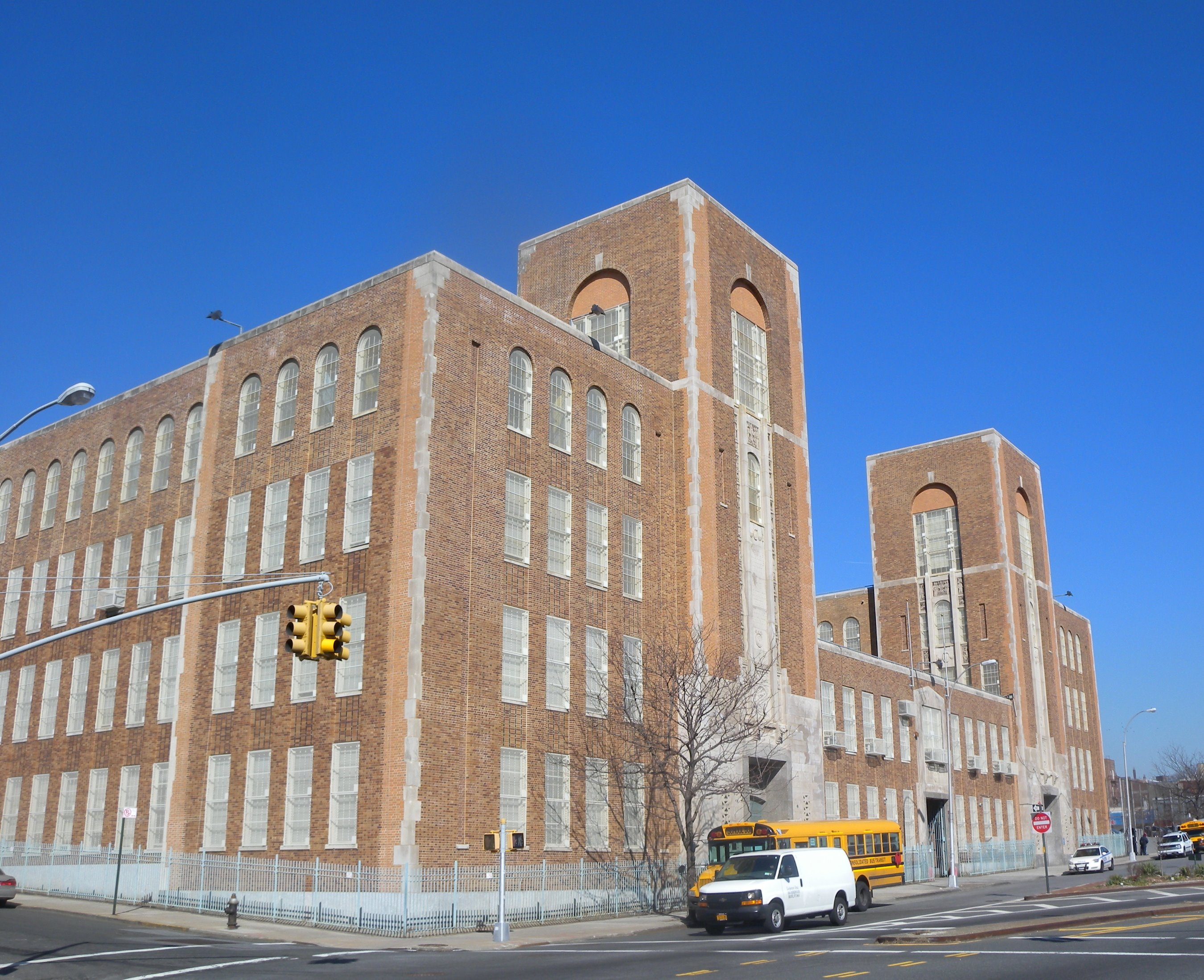
Samuel Gompers High School (2012)

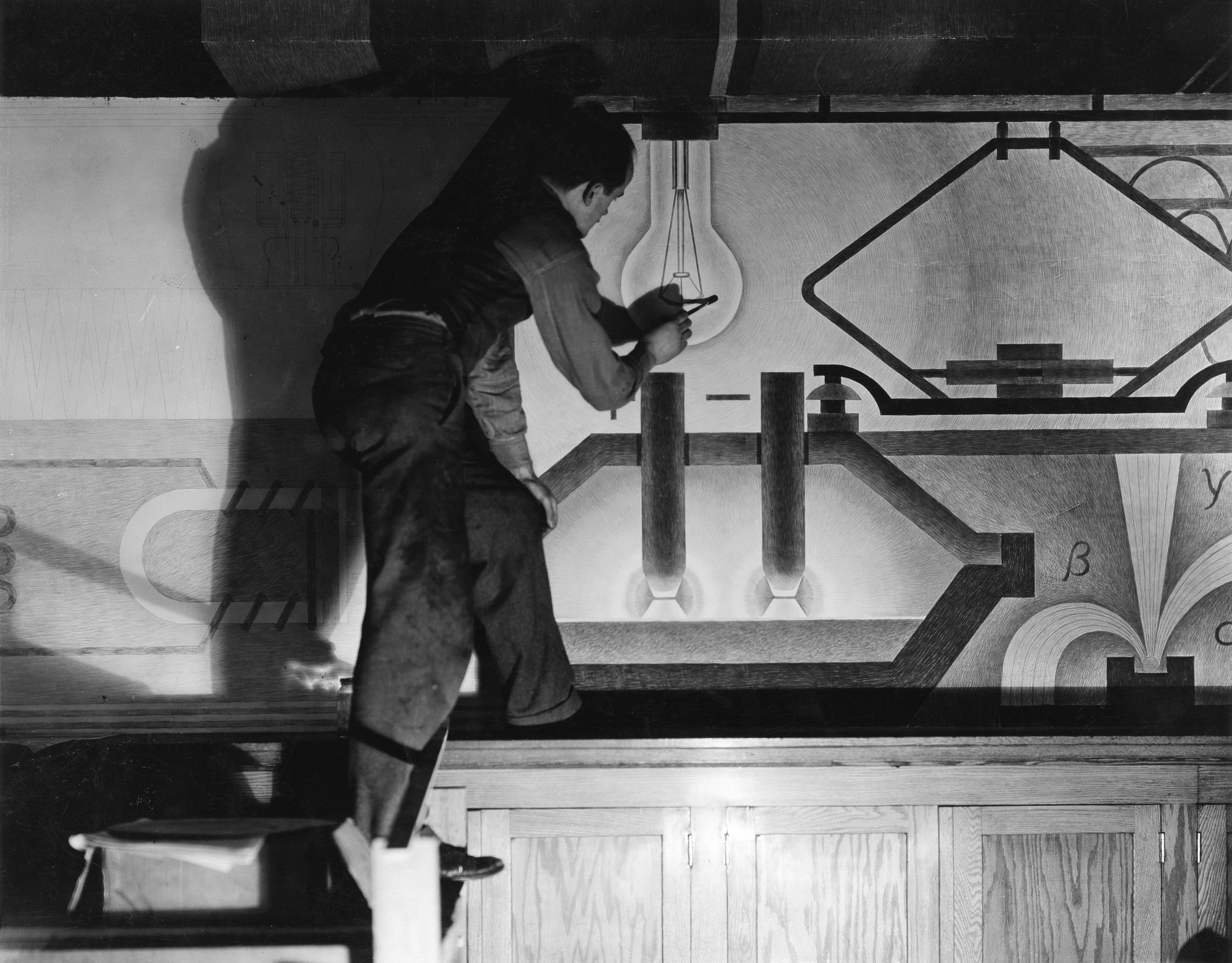

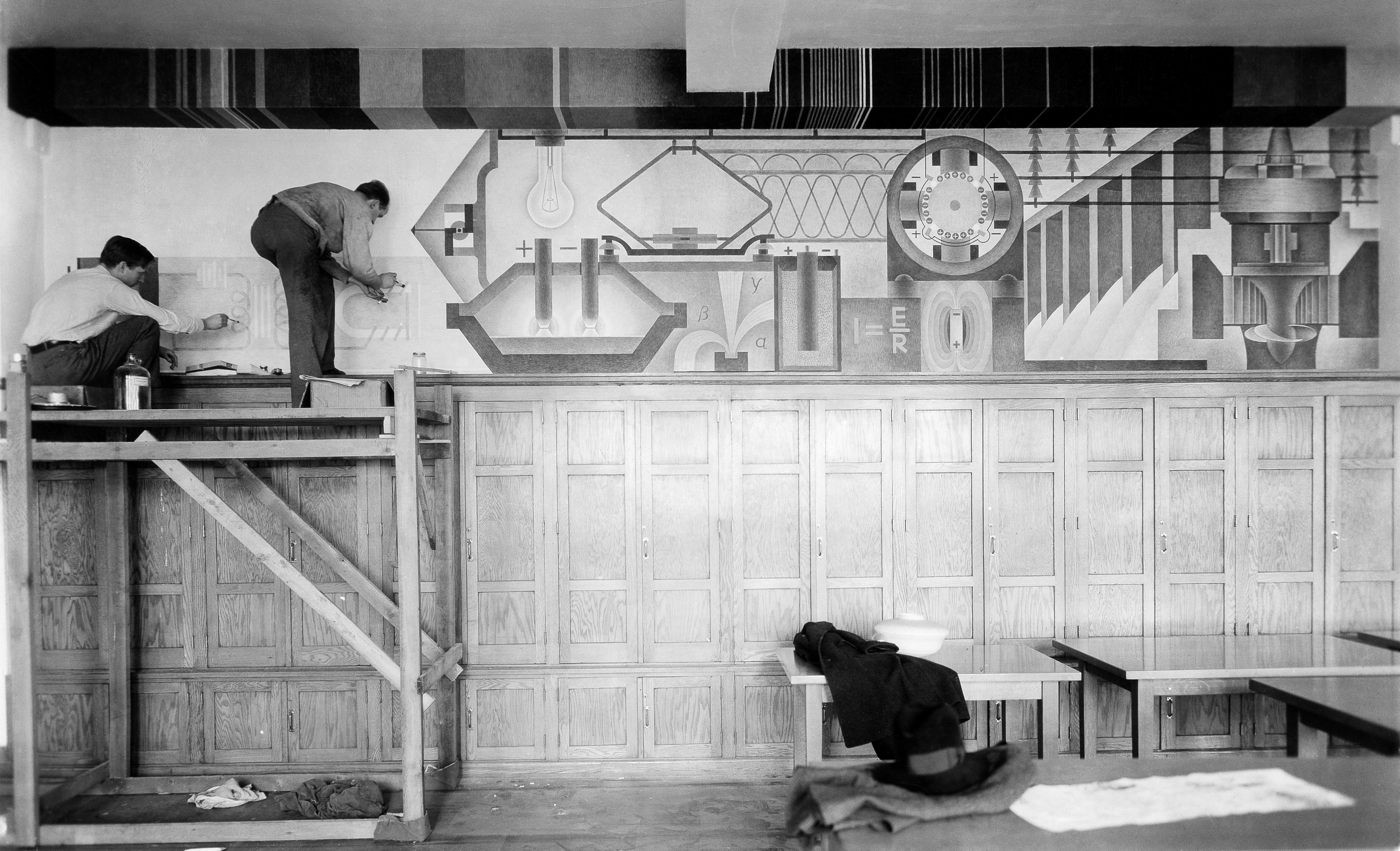
WPA muralist Eric Mose at work on his fresco, Power (1936), in the library of Samuel Gompers Industrial High School for Boys

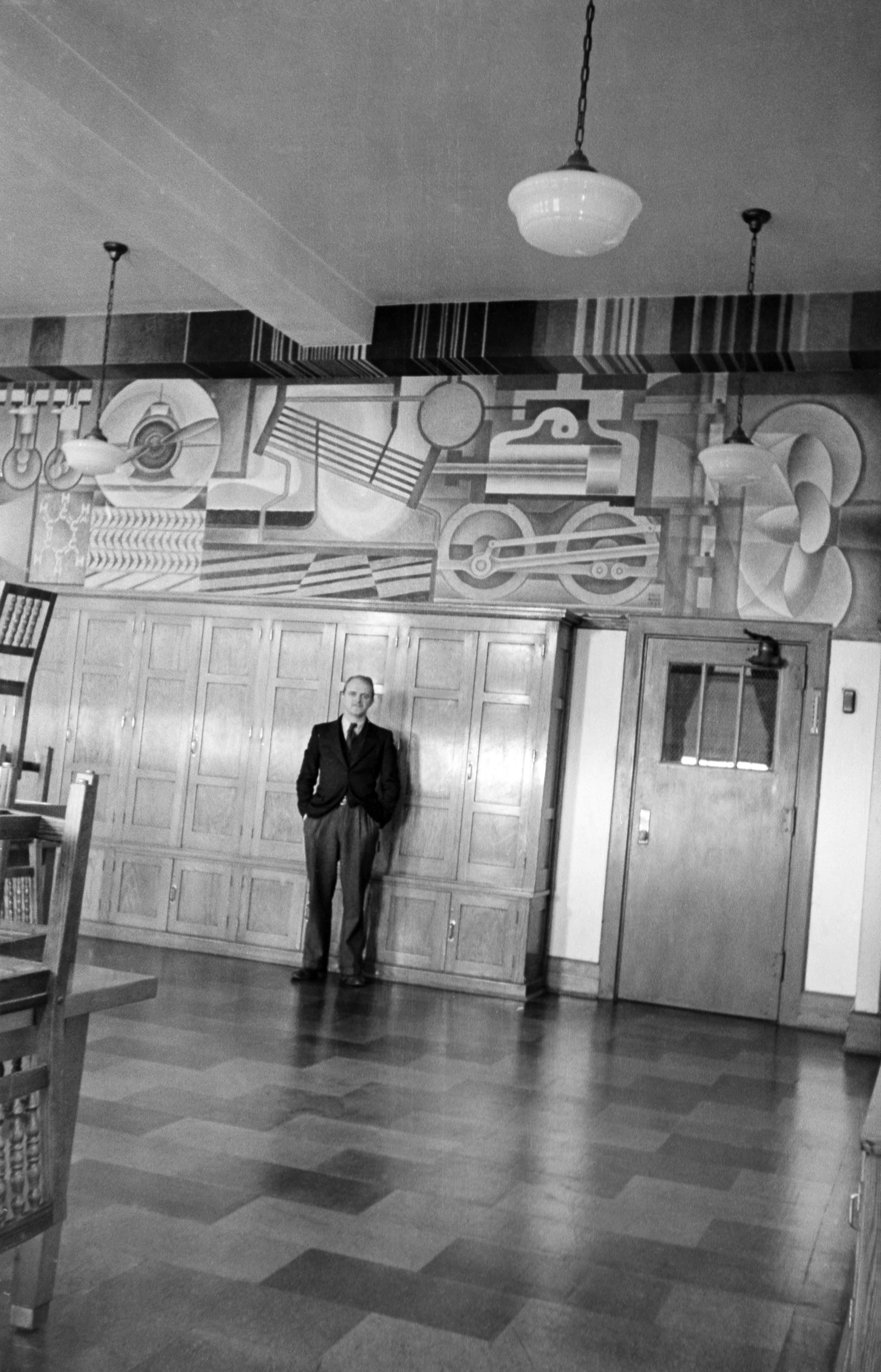
Eric Mose with his mural Power (1936)

Samuel Gompers Career and Technical Education High School was a public vocational school for grades 9–12 located in East Morrisania, Bronx, New York, named for American Federation of Labor founder Samuel Gompers. The school was founded in 1930 as Samuel Gompers Industrial High School for Boys. It was closed in 2012.

== Public art ==
Samuel Gompers High School is the site for a notable Federal Art Project mural created in 1936 by Eric Mose. The three-panel, 600-square-foot fresco, Power, was created in the school library. The work was described in an April 1938 article in The New York Times:

The central theme of this mural is Light. The artist of two decades ago probably would have pictured light as a Greek lady with a torch, or possibly as Prometheus. Mose, however, has combined cubism with physics. The central "figure" is a stylized abstraction of the sun, seen in design with a prism, which relates to a broad band of color that runs along the top of the mural and is broken up into brilliant stripes—the spectrum.

Beneath this field the artist has made an abstract design of the forms through which we know light and power. One recognizes spark-plugs, dynamos and such actual electrical machines as a fan. Those forms are all carried out in color-design derived from the spectrum above, and interestingly applied to individual objects such as infra-red, violet ray and other "light" instruments.

Thus the mural, a great field of glowing, angled color that looks, superficially, like something by a cubist, and has the quality of Chartres stained glass, is at the same time an accurate scientific chart. Moveover, it is used as one by the school, and so effectively that almost any boy one may find in the library can explain its design.

== Notable alumni ==
- Chris Lighty (1968–2012), was an American music industry executive. He co-founded Violator, a record label,
- Frank Malzone (1930–2015), was an All-Star Major League Baseball player.
- Grandmaster Flash (1958–present), is a legendary American DJ.
