= North Fork Bank =

American bank

North Fork Bancorporation
- Trade name: North Fork Bank
- Traded as: NYSE: NFB
- Industry: Bank holding company
- Founded: 1858; 168 years ago (as Southold Savings); 1905; 121 years ago (as Mattituck Bank); 1950; 76 years ago (as North Fork Bank)
- Defunct: March 28, 2008
- Fate: Acquired by Capital One
- Successor: Capital One
- Headquarters: Melville, New York, U.S.
- Products: Financial services
- Website: Archived website

North Fork Bank was an American bank that operated from 1950 until 2008 when it was acquired by Capital One Bank and was merged into that bank. In November 2007, it had 365 branches in the New York metropolitan area.

== History ==
North Fork early history was dominated by mergers of banks on the North Fork, Suffolk County, New York. Its earliest component was Southold Savings Bank in Southold, New York (although the company dates its history from 1905 with the founding of Mattituck Bank in Mattituck, New York, which would become the most active early partner).

It first assumed the name of North Fork Bank & Trust Company in 1950 through the consolidation of Mattituck and First National Bank of Cutchogue in Cutchogue, New York. North Fork Bancorporation was formed in 1980 and Southold Savings was acquired in 1988.

In the 1990s, it began an aggressive move into New York City market with the acquisition of

- Eastchester Financial Corporation in Eastchester, New York, in 1991;
- Bayside Federal Savings in Bayside, New York, in 1994;
- the Bank of Great Neck in Great Neck, New York, in 1995;
- 10 locations of First Nationwide in 1996;
- North Side Savings in 1996;
- Branford Savings Bank (in Branford, Connecticut) in 1997;
- Home Federal Savings in 1998;
- Amivest Corporation in 1998;
- New York Bancorp in 1998;
- Reliance Federal Savings in 1999;
- Jamaica Savings Bank FSB in 1999;
- the domestic deposits of Commercial Bank of New York in 2001 (marking an expansion of its two branches in Manhattan);
- the Trust Company of New Jersey in 2004,
- GreenPoint Financial, in 2004.

North Fork Logo Pre-2005

At the time of its acquisition, the bank served the New York City metropolitan area with over 350 branches and around $60 billion in assets. The bank specialized in commercial banking. North Fork Bank CEO John Kanas incorporated the bank in 1980, joined Capital One with the 2006 acquisition, and in 2007, stepped down from his position as Capital One's head of banking.

The bank's reporting of unusual transactions made by then-New York Governor Eliot Spitzer led to the criminal investigation that led to the Governor stepping down in March 2008.

=== GreenPoint Mortgage ===
In 2005, North Fork Bank acquired Greenpoint Finance Corp, one of the first innovators of Alt-A mortgages. Capital One later acquired North Fork and thus GreenPoint along with it. In August 2007, as a result of the 2007 subprime mortgage financial crisis, Capital One announced that it was eliminating its GreenPoint Mortgage unit, citing an inability to sell its mortgages on the secondary market. As of November 8, 2017, Capital One no longer offers mortgages.

Capital One acquired GreenPoint and its Melville, New York, headquarters for $14.6 billion U.S. dollars. It was only the second bank bought by Capital One, and was the larger of two acquisitions comprising Capital One's 2005-06 expansion into retail banking. On March 10, 2008, all North Fork Banks began using the Capital One branding.

The bank has naming rights to the North Fork Theatre at Westbury (formerly the Westbury Music Fair). It is located in the Westbury postal-zone section of Jericho, New York.
