= Sears Roebuck & Company Department Store (Brooklyn) =

Historic building in Brooklyn, New York

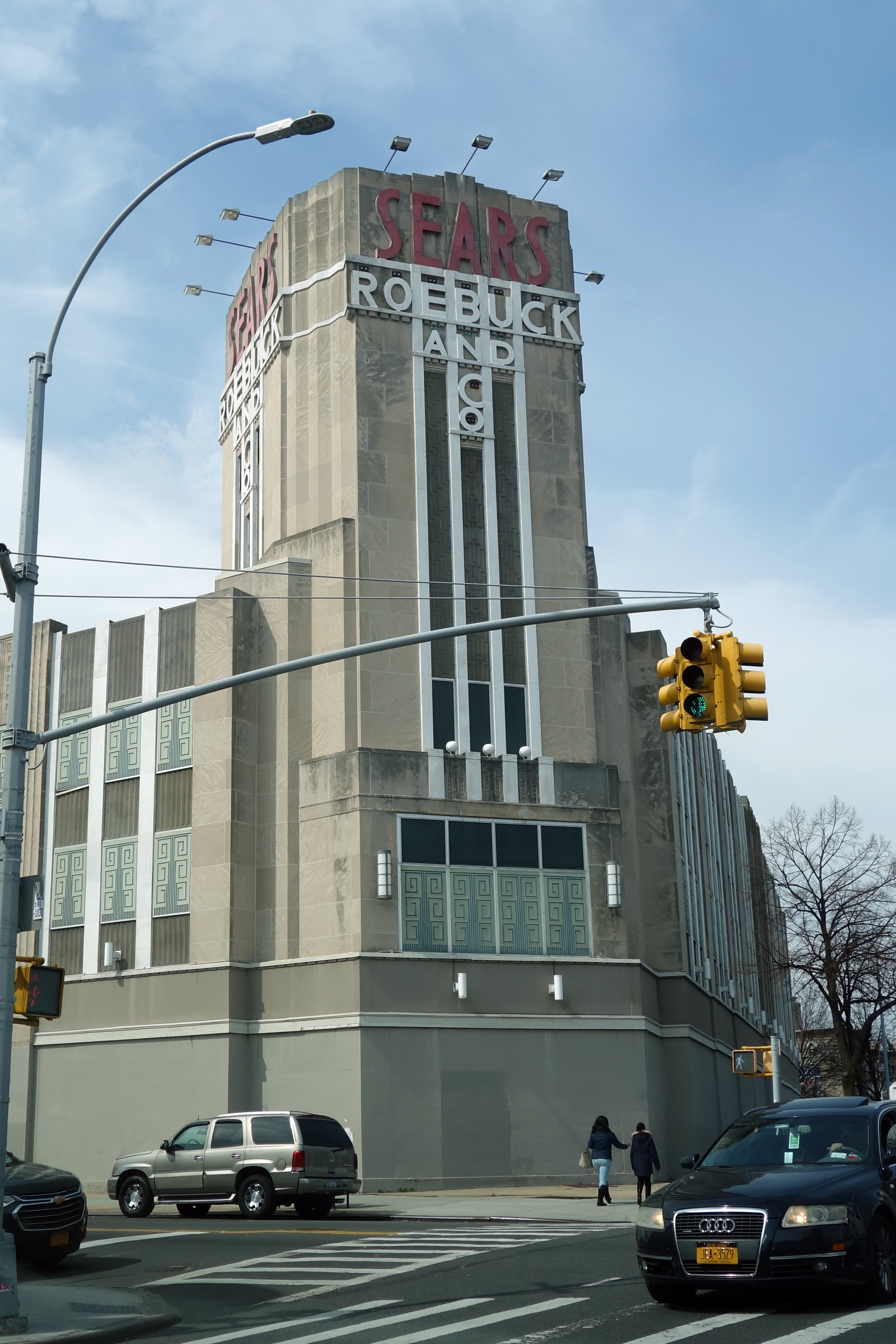
- The building from the corner of Beverly Rd. and Bedford Ave., 2019
- Interactive map of Sears Roebuck & Company Department Store
- 40°38′42″N 73°57′19″W

History
- Built: 1932

Site notes
- Architect(s): Nimmons, Carr & Wright, with Alton L. Craft
- Architectural style: Art Deco

New York City Landmark
- Designated: May 15, 2012
- Reference no.: 2469

The Sears Roebuck & Company Department Store is a landmarked former department store in the Flatbush neighborhood of Brooklyn in New York City.

== Description ==
The Sears Roebuck & Company Department Store is an Art Deco edifice of three stories, plus a 103-foot tower. The building is situated at the corner of Beverly Road and Beford Avenue in an L shape, with nine bays of grouped windows or entrances along Bedford and four along Beverly. Each window bay had a large display window, while the entrance bays are flanked by limestone piers and decorative spandrel panels that draw the eyes upward. The entrances are recessed to protect customers from inclement weather.

== History ==
=== Background ===
The town of Flatbush was annexed by the neighboring city of Brooklyn in 1894. In the subsequent decades the area saw intense development, spurred by increasing transit. By the 1920s the intersection of Church and Flatbush Avenues was a busy commercial area. Having started with mail order sales, Sears, Roebuck and Co. expanded to retail operations in 1925; by 1929 it was the third-largest retailer in the country, and it continued growing through the subsequent Great Depression.

Sears opened its first retail store in New York City in the Crown Heights neighborhood of Brooklyn in 1930. They announced a new flagship store for the location at Bedford Avenue and Beverly Road in March 1932; the site was near the busy commercial area on Flatbush Avenue, and its location was chosen to target the "motoring shopper"—land in the area was cheaper than congested downtown Brooklyn, and it was centrally located between the established, older neighborhoods to the north and the developing, car-equipped southern regions. Originally, the site was to have occupied two blocks, separated by the course of East 23rd St.; the road was not extended, and the blocks were merged.

=== Construction ===
The site was originally occupied by roughly ten homes and car barns. The Cheshill Realty Corporation acquired 25 parcels for the store through private negotiations in 1931–1932; the Brooklyn Eagle called the purchases the "Flatbush mystery". The announcement of the new store, coinciding with two others in Union City and Hackensack, New Jersey, was only made once all the land had been purchased.

=== 21st century ===
The building was made a New York City designated landmark in 2012. At this point, Sears was in dire financial straits; the company had merged with Kmart a few years earlier amid increasing competition from ecommerce, and under chief executive Eddie Lampert started spinning off brands and selling stores. In 2018, the company filed for bankruptcy protection, and the store would become the final open Sears location in New York City.

During the COVID-19 pandemic, the parking lot served as a drive-thru testing area. In November 2021, the Sears closed. Although the landmarked building is protected from demolition, Clipper Equity announced plans to build two seven-story buildings on the remainder of the site, with 650 residential units between them. In March 2024, Clipper Equity received a $24 million loan for the redevelopment. Clipper also received $300 million from an undisclosed source that April and a $95 million loan from Bank Hapoalim that June.
