= Park Plaza Apartments (Bronx) =

- U.S. National Register of Historic Places
- New York City Landmark
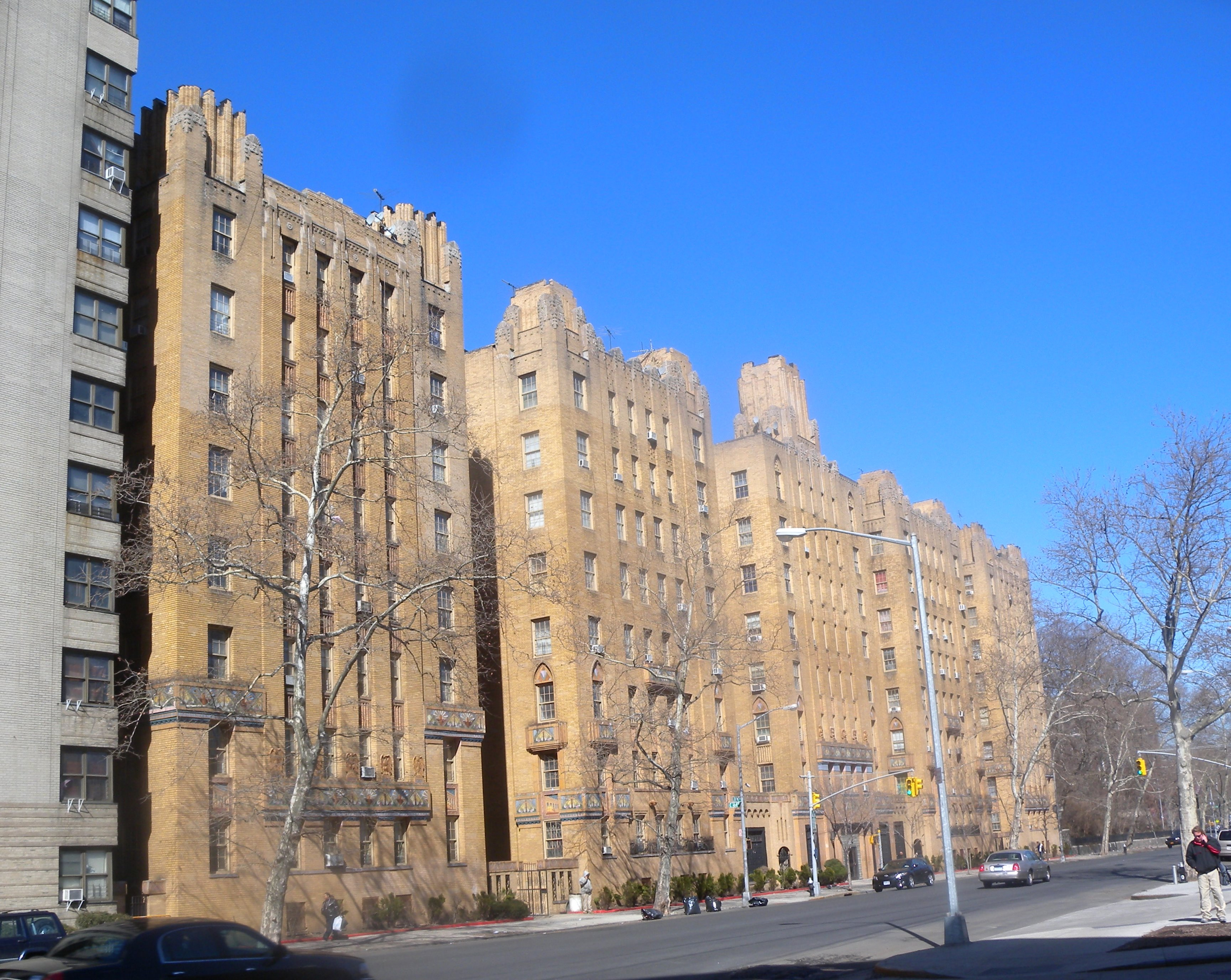
- Park Plaza Apartments, March 2011

- Location within New York City Location within New York Location within the United States
- Location: 1005 Jerome Ave., Bronx, New York
- Coordinates: 40°49′53″N 73°55′36″W
- Built: 1928
- Architect: Horace Ginsbern; Marvin Fine
- Architectural style: Art Deco
- NRHP reference No.: 82003346
- NYCL No.: 1077

Significant dates
- Added to NRHP: June 3, 1982
- Designated NYCL: May 12, 1981

The Park Plaza Apartments were one of the first and most prominent Art Deco apartment buildings erected in the Bronx, New York City. The eight-story, polychromatic terra cotta embellished structure at 1005 Jerome Avenue and West 164th Street was designed by Horace Ginsberg and Marvin Fine and completed in 1931. It is an eight-story building divided into five blocks or sections, each six bays wide. There are about 200 apartments, ranging from one to five rooms.

It became a New York City designated landmark in 1981 and was listed on the National Register of Historic Places in 1982.

== See also ==
- List of New York City Designated Landmarks in The Bronx
- National Register of Historic Places in Bronx County, New York
