= Horace Ginsbern =

American architect

Horace Ginsbern (né Ginsberg, 1902–1987) was an American architect. His firm, Horace Ginsbern & Associates, was responsible for the Park Plaza Apartments the first Art Deco building in the Bronx, New York, as well as the Fish Building on the Grand Concourse. He also designed 225 East 74th Street in Manhattan, which was built by the Bricken Brothers (1937); it has been the home to many people in the arts including violinist Felix Galimir and playwright/screenwriter David Shaw (Redhead, If It's Tuesday, This Must Be Belgium).
