= Offerman =

Offerman, Offermann, or Offermanns is a surname. Notable people with the surname include:

- Birgit Offermann (born 1960), German retired footballer
- Heribert Offermanns (born 1937), German chemist
- José Offerman (born 1968), Dominican baseball player
- JoJo Offerman (born 1994), American ring announcer
- Nick Offerman (born 1970), American actor, writer, comedian, and producer

== See also ==
- Offerman Building, a historic building
- Offerman, Georgia, a city in United States
- Offermann Stadium, an outdoor baseball and football stadium in Buffalo, New York
