= Hyde and Benham =

American theatre firm

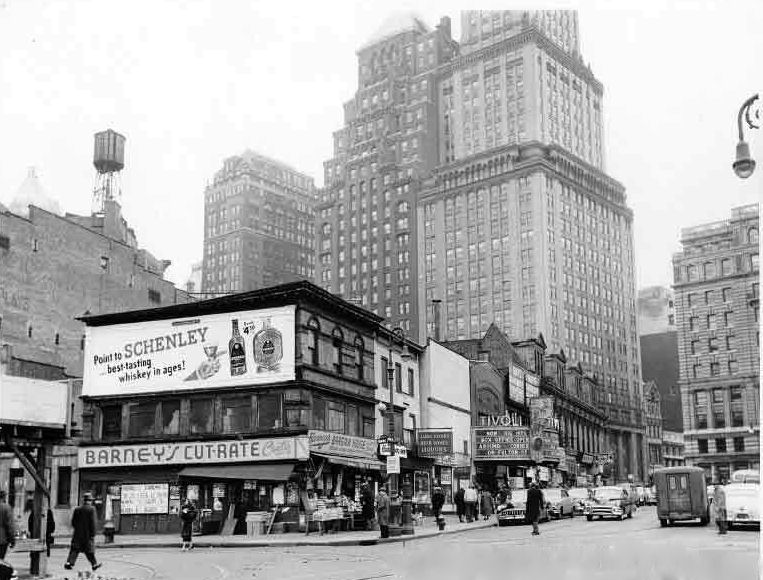
A 1954 photograph of the Tivoli Theatre; formerly named Hyde & Benhams Theater.

Hyde and Benham, was an American theatre firm that was owned and operated by Brooklyn-based impresarios Richard Hyde (1856–1912) and Louis C. Benham (1855–1902). They owned several theaters in the cities of Philadelphia, Brooklyn, and Baltimore from the 1870s into the early part of the 20th century. Through their theatre chain, they programmed new stage works that made innovative contributions to the art forms of burlesque and vaudeville. Two of their many theaters in Brooklyn were the Grand Opera House, and the Hyde & Behmans Theater.
