= Offerman Building =

Building in Brooklyn, New York

- U.S. National Register of Historic Places
- New York State Register of Historic Places
- New York City Landmark
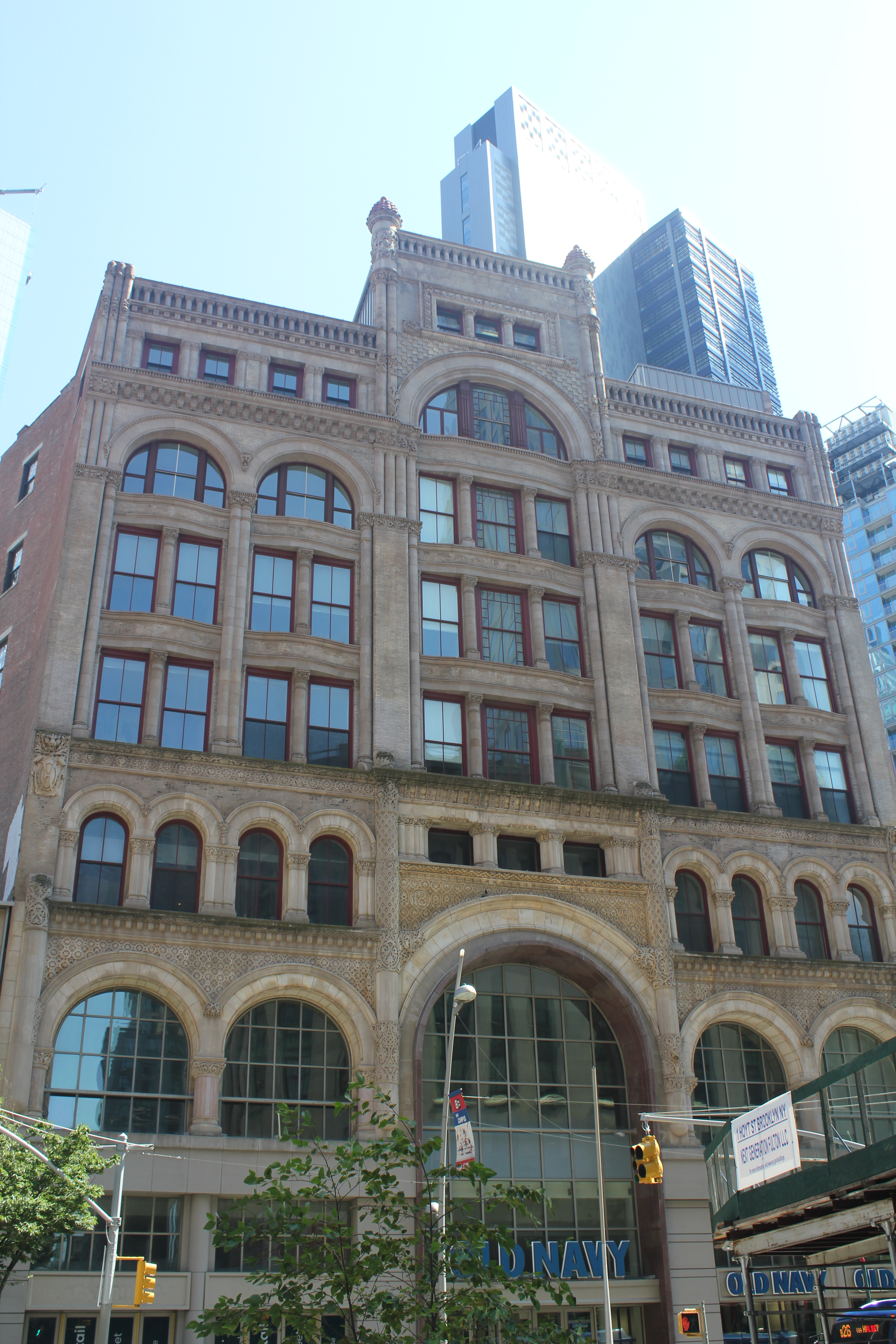
- Location: 503–513 Fulton Street, Brooklyn, New York 11201, U.S.
- Coordinates: 40°41′27″N 73°59′05″W
- Built: 1890–1892
- Architect: Peter J. Lauritzen
- Architectural style: Romanesque Revival
- NRHP reference No.: 100000661
- NYSRHP No.: 04701.015763
- NYCL No.: 2169

Significant dates
- Added to NRHP: February 21, 2017
- Designated NYSRHP: December 16, 2016
- Designated NYCL: March 15, 2005

The Offerman Building is a historic building at 503–513 Fulton Street in the Downtown Brooklyn neighborhood of New York City, New York, U.S. Designed by Danish architect Peter J. Lauritzen in a Romanesque Revival style, the eight-story building was built between 1890 and 1892 as a commercial structure, housing the S. Wechsler & Brother department store. Although the lower stories remain in commercial use, the upper stories were converted into a 121-unit residential complex in the 2010s. The building is a New York City designated landmark and is listed on the National Register of Historic Places.

The building has three distinct sections: the original wings on Fulton Street to the south and Duffield Street to the east, as well as a three-story glass annex on Bridge Street to the west that dates from the 2010s. On the Fulton and Duffield Street wings, the first and second stories of the facade are clad in stone, while brick and terracotta were used on the upper stories. The Fulton Street wing is mostly seven stories high (except for the central eight-story section), while the Duffield Street wing is six stories high. Inside, the building was originally used in its entirety as a department store, with various selling departments on each floor, as well as a small mechanical plant in the basement. The building's interior has been rearranged multiple times throughout the years; by the 2010s, only the basement and first two stories remained in retail use.

The building was developed by Brooklyn Sugar Refining Company president Henry Offerman, who agreed in late 1889 to lease the entire structure to S. Wechsler & Bro. (later Wechsler Bros. & Co.). The Offerman Building opened on May 1, 1891, and was expanded along Duffield Street in 1892 after the store's business grew significantly. Wechsler Bros. & Co. occupied the building until 1895, when Offerman took over the store. Joseph H. Bauland operated the store from 1897 to 1903, and Chapman & Co. then operated the store until 1907. The structure was then used as offices from 1909 to 1922, when Martin's department store moved into the building. Martin's occupied the Offerman Building for nearly six decades, moving out during 1979, after which the Laboz family's company United American Land bought the building. In the first two decades of the 21st century, the Laboz family leased out the lowest floors as retail space and converted the upper stories to apartments.

== Site ==
The Offerman Building is located at 503–513 Fulton Street in the Downtown Brooklyn neighborhood of New York City, New York, U.S. It occupies an irregular land lot on the city block bounded by Fulton Street to the south, Bridge Street to the west, Willoughby Street to the north, and Duffield Street (Abolitionist Place) to the east. The original building has frontage of 100 feet (30 m) on Fulton Street and 180 ft (55 m) along Duffield Street; including the newer annex, it has an area of 46,046 square feet (4,277.8 m^{2}). Originally, the building's Duffield Street frontage was only 94 ft (29 m) wide. The Fulton Street wing originally extended about 160 feet (49 m) deep, but an extension in 1893 increased this depth to 275 feet (84 m).

Due to the unusual shape of the lot, both of the original building's frontages are in the middle of their respective blockfronts. The Offerman Building's site wraps around three buildings at the corner of Fulton and Duffield Streets, which the building's developers had never acquired. Nearby buildings include 388 Bridge Street to the northwest, BellTel Lofts and AVA DoBro to the north, and 1 Hoyt Street and 11 Hoyt to the south. In addition, the entrances to the New York City Subway's Hoyt Street station are next to the building.

The Offerman Building's site was part of the 19th-century Duffield estate. The adjacent stretch of Fulton Street, between Brooklyn Borough Hall and Flatbush Avenue, was known as "upper Fulton Street" in the 19th century and was the commercial center of the then-independent city of Brooklyn. After the Brooklyn Bridge opened during the late 19th century, upper Fulton Street contained large numbers of retail stores, which had relocated from the Fulton Ferry landing near the East River shoreline. The opening of the Fulton Street Elevated line in 1888, as well as the opening of the New York City Subway system in the early 20th century, attracted further commercial development in the area. Just before the Offerman Building was erected, the site had been occupied by houses.

== Architecture ==
The building was designed by Peter J. Lauritzen in the Romanesque Revival style. According to the Brooklyn Daily Times, the Romanesque Revival style had been chosen because it "readily lends itself to richness and solidity of design". It ranges between six and eight stories; the section on Fulton Street is generally seven stories high, while the wing on Duffield Street is six stories high. The eight-story tower at the center of the Fulton Street wing was built to a height of 150 feet (46 m). Although the Offerman Building's floor count was not unusual for its time, the ceilings were so high that the structure was one of the tallest buildings in Brooklyn when it opened in 1891.

=== Facade ===
On the Fulton Street elevation of the facade, the first and second stories were originally clad with granite, with a light sandstone band above the second story; brick and terracotta are used on the upper stories. The vertical quality of the Fulton Street facade is emphasized by the use of vertical piers, similar to in early skyscrapers. In addition, Lauritzen divided the facade into numerous arcades to give the facade a quality of intricacy. The lowest two stories on Fulton Street have been renovated at least three times: in the 1940s, 1980s, and 2010s. The Duffield Street elevation is similar, except that gray stone is used on the lowest two stories instead.

==== Fulton Street wing ====
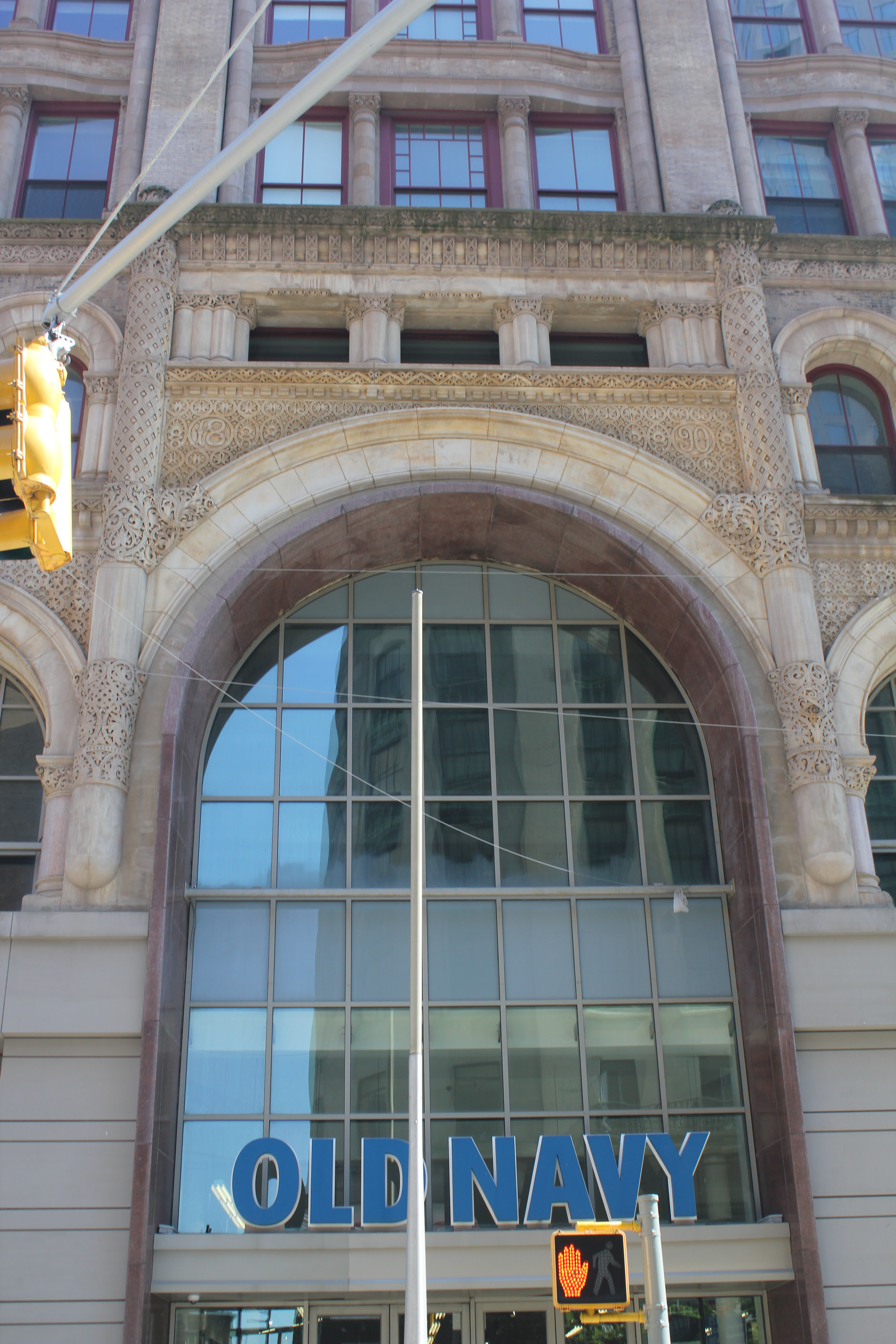
Main entrance

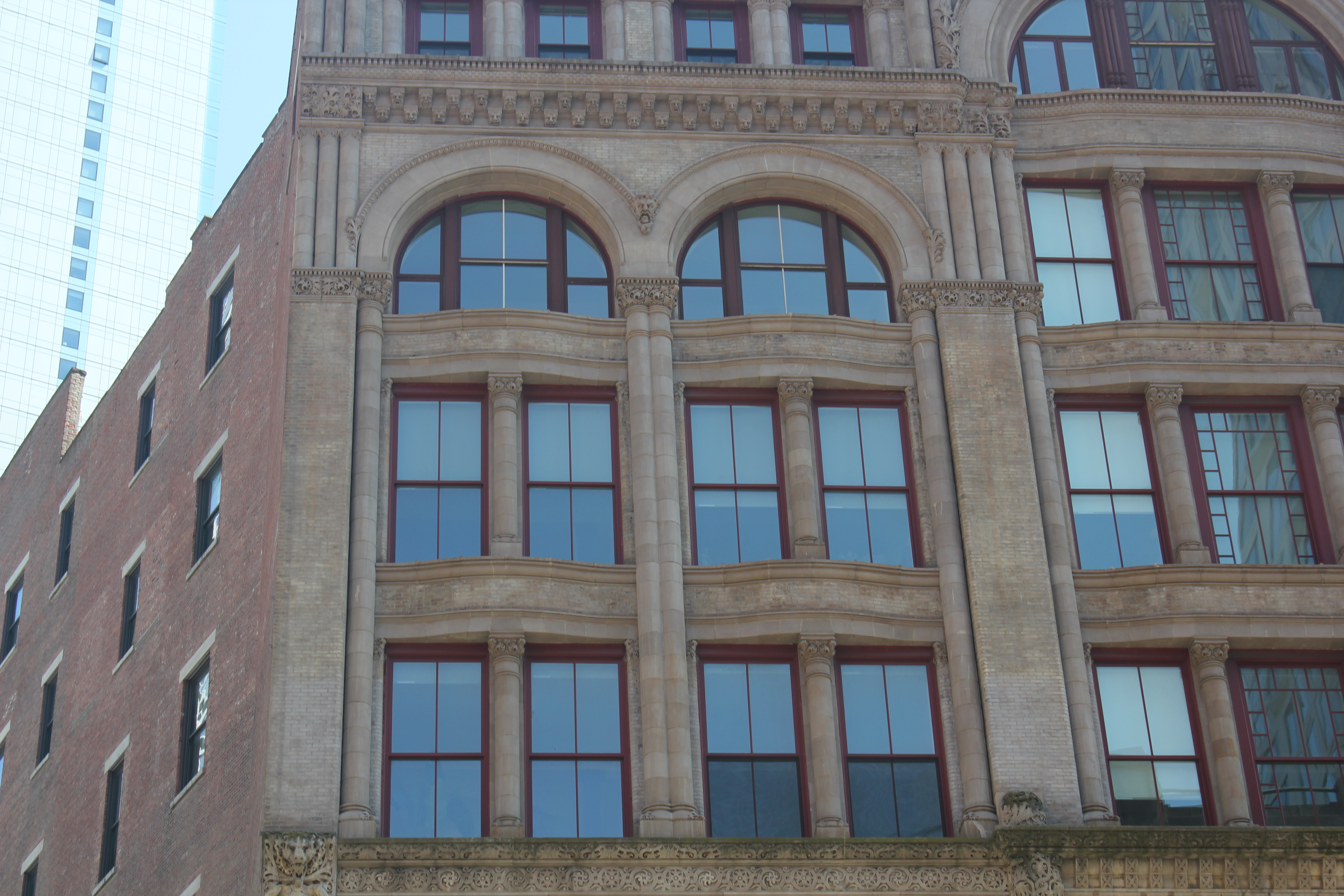
Details of windows atop the Fulton Street facade

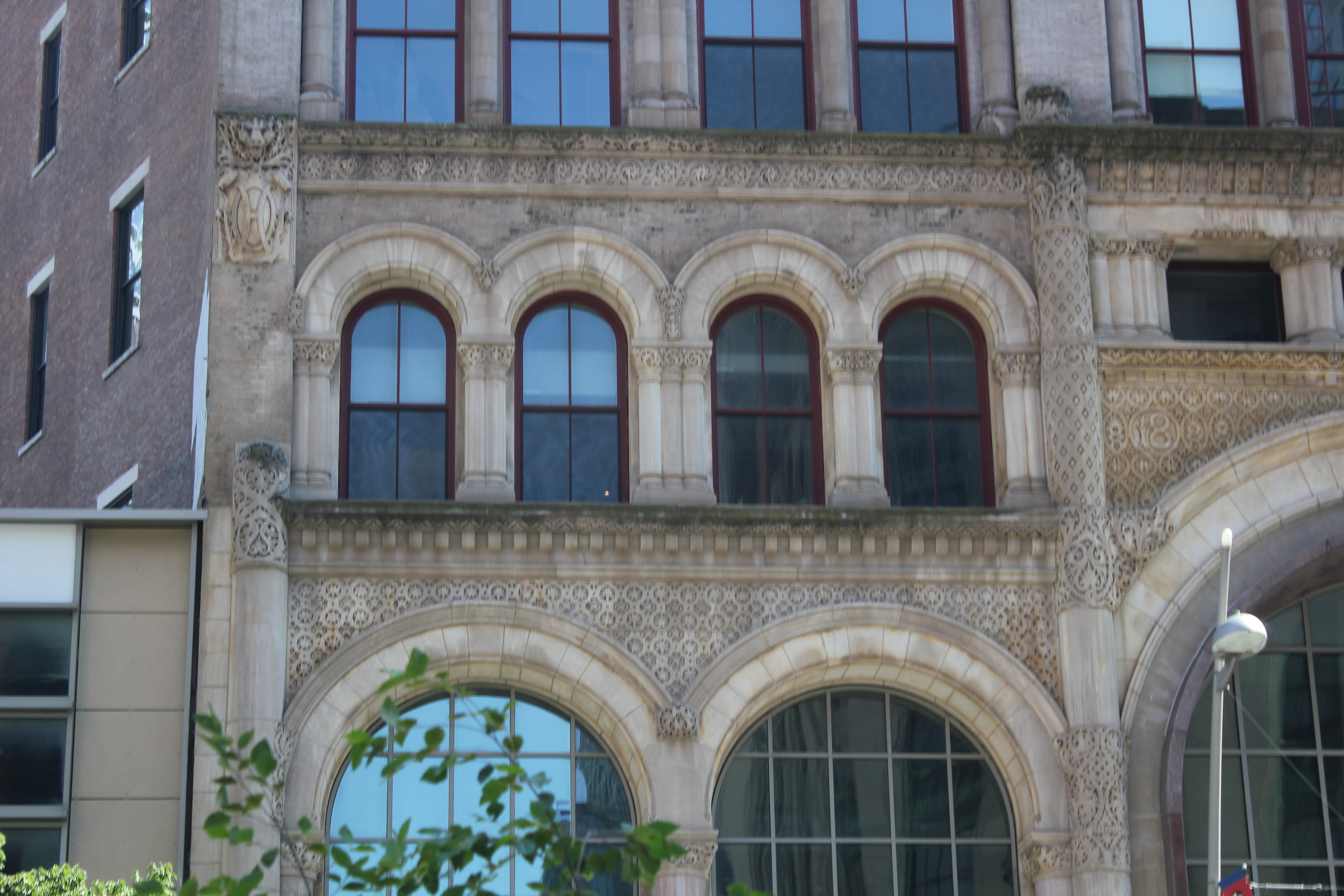
Details of windows near the bottom of the Fulton Street facade

The facade on Fulton Street is divided vertically into three bays: a central section measuring eight stories tall, which is flanked by a pair of seven-story sections. There were originally five arches at ground level. The central section originally was decorated with a three-story arch measuring 25 feet (7.6 m) wide. Each of the outer sections had two display windows measuring 12 feet (3.7 m) high and 13 feet (4.0 m) wide, with transom windows above. Running above the first floor was a cornice which divided the ground and second floors; this cornice was at the same height as the former Fulton Street Elevated. During the 1940s, Morris Lapidus designed a new central arch with a red granite frame and a grid of windows. This arch rises two and a half stories and is surrounded with ornament; above the center arch is a small colonnade with three windows separated by colonnettes. In the outer sections, the first and second stories were redesigned in the 2010s with a cast stone facade, in a simple imitation of the original design, and metal-and-glass storefronts. There are two smaller arches on either side of the central arch at the second story. On the third story, each of the outer sections has four arched windows, supported by colonnettes. There are also lions with the initials "H. O." (standing for Henry Offerman) at either corner.

The windows on the fourth through eighth floors were replaced in 2015. On the fourth to sixth stories, the outer sections of the facade each have two triple-height arches, with two window openings per story. The spandrel panels above the windows on these stories protrude from the facade; this was intended to create the impression of organic quality. Within either of the outer sections, a cornice runs horizontally above the sixth story, and there are four rectangular windows on the seventh story. The center section of the facade has a quadruple-height arch that ascends to the seventh story; the central arch is divided vertically into three windows on each story. Only the center section rises to the eighth floor, where there are three windows. There are molded Romanesque Revival decorations, such as faces and reliefs, on the sixth through eighth stories above the arches, and there are stone finials atop the eighth floors.

The side facades of the Fulton Street wing are plain in design. The western facade has window openings and is set back significantly from the wing on Bridge Street. The third through sixth stories each have four windows, while the seventh story has five windows; the rest of the western facade is of plain brick. The eastern facade of the Fulton Street wing was covered by an advertisement until the 2000s. After the 2010s renovation, the eastern facade has had two windows on each of the fourth to sixth stories, while the seventh story has had three windows. There is a wooden water tower above the eastern section of the roof.

==== Duffield Street wing ====
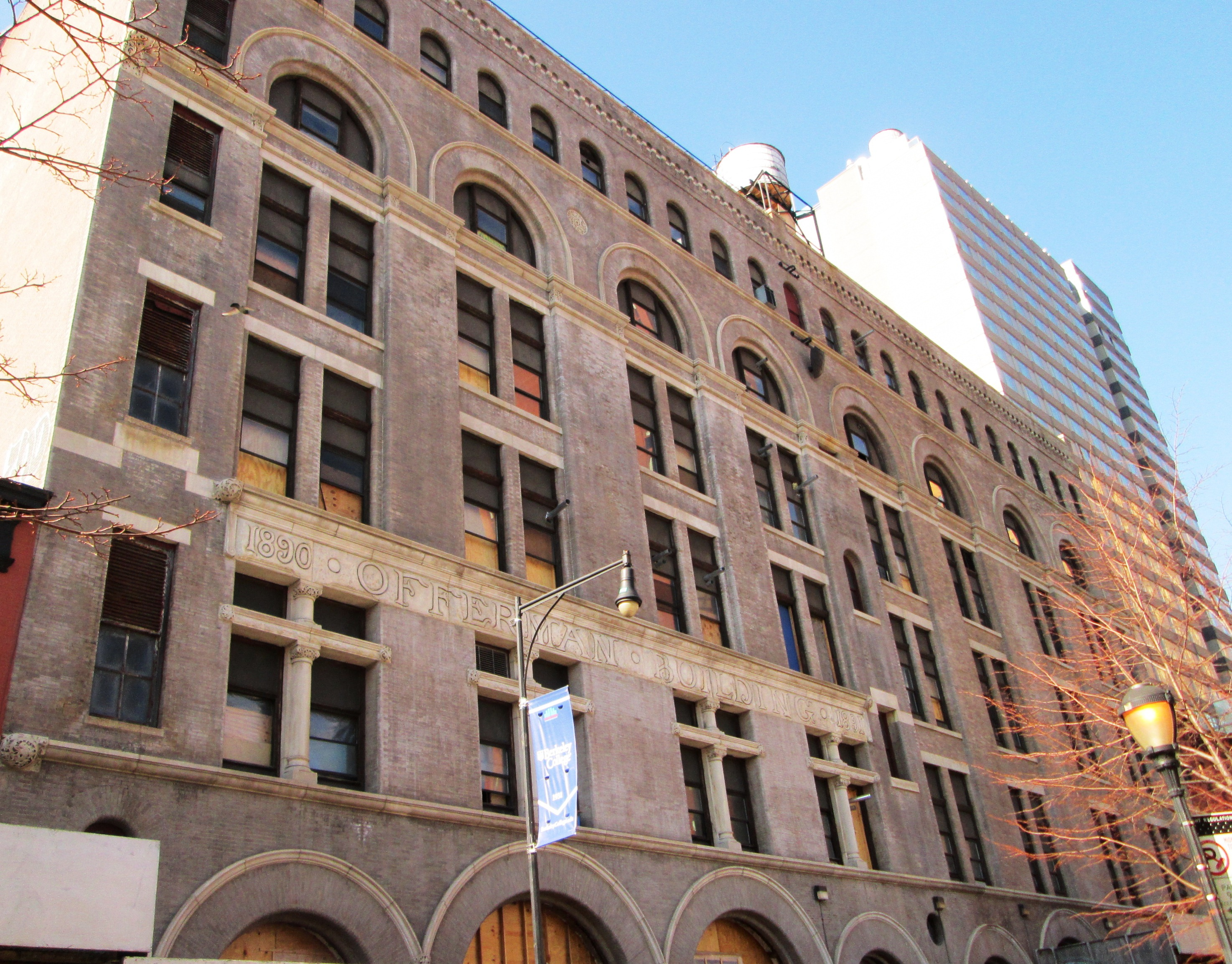
View of the building from Duffield Street

The facade on Duffield Street is for the most part six stories tall and ten bays wide. The center eight bays are in two groups of four. All of the windows on Duffield Street date from the 2010s renovation. At the ground story, each bay has an arch supported on large granite piers; the two center arches in each group are taller than the two outer arches. The arches generally feature storefronts that were installed in the 2010s; the southernmost arch serves as the building's residential entrance, which is covered by a glass canopy. The arches originally had large windows that illuminated the back of the ground-level store. There is a deeply recessed window at the extreme northern and southern ends of the Duffield Street facade.

On the second through fifth stories, there are quadruple-height arches supported by shallow pilasters in the eight center bays. There are two windows on the center pilaster: one between the second and third stories, which is rectangular, and one between the third and fourth stories, which is arched. In the four bays immediately to the south of the center pilaster, there is a frieze with the words "1890 Offerman Building 1892" carved above the second floor. There are 23 arched windows on the sixth story, above which is a brick cornice with corbels. At the center of the sixth story is a metal cartouche, which is painted red and bears the overlapping letters "H" and "O".

The northern wall of this wing, measuring 100 feet (30 m) wide, has windows that are visible above the roofs of adjacent buildings. The western wall is 130 ft (40 m) wide and has eleven rectangular windows on each of the third through sixth floors. There is a glass-and-metal penthouse above the Duffield Street wing. The southern wall has no windows and is clad in brick.

==== Bridge Street wing ====
The Bridge Street wing, designed by Greenberg Farrow, was added in 2014 and wraps around the northeastern corner of Bridge and Fulton Street, extending to the Offerman Building's original northern end. The Bridge Street wing is two stories high and has a facade with metal and concrete frame, as well as full-height glass windows. The ground floor contains a storefront with a store entrance, while the second floor is reached through the original building. The structure has a flat roof above the second story.

=== Interior ===
The original building on Fulton Street had 20,000 square feet (1,900 m^{2}) on each floor. The annex on Duffield Street increased the building's total size to approximately 30,000 ft^{2} (2,800 m^{2}) per floor or 200,000 ft^{2} (19,000 m^{2}) in total. The building's framework may have included both cast-iron and steel columns; the columns were placed in four rows and supported horizontal girders beneath each floor slab. Near the rear left of the building were originally two elevators and a staircase connecting all floors. Following an expansion in 1892, there were seven elevators in total: three freight elevators, one dumbwaiter for packages, and three passenger elevators.

The second basement houses a small electric plant installed by the Excelsior Electric Light Company. The plant consisted of four 120 hp (89 kW) boilers, four 60 hp (45 kW) engines (of which three were used to power the dynamos for the building's arc lights), and pumps to operate the elevators. The building was also outfitted with a central heating system, which at the time was still uncommon. The ceiling of the first basement contained an extensive system of pipes, which was used to carry cash from various parts of the building to a central cash room. Reflectors were placed throughout the building to minimize the need for artificial light during the daytime.

Although the whole building was originally used for retail purposes, the interiors have been renovated multiple times throughout the years. The first major renovation occurred in the 1940s, and some of the building's original decorations were removed after the second renovation in the 1980s, when the upper stories became offices. Following the third renovation in the 2010s, the building was split into commercial space on the lower two floors and residences above.

==== Original use ====
When the building opened, the central arch on Fulton Street led to a vestibule with marble-mosaic tiles spelling out the name of the first tenant, S. Wechsler & Bro. The first story was devoted to the sale of "dress goods"; furnishings such as cabinets; and other objects like umbrellas and cutlery. A central aisle ran the full length of the first floor, and there was a counter on one side. A 35-foot-wide (11 m) light well with a dome was placed at the center of the building, extending several stories. Within this dome, a balcony with a women's parlor overlooked the first floor; this was replaced with a music room by the 1900s. Also on Duffield Street were a private employee entrance and an employees' room. By 1899, the first floor had been converted to a men's clothing department. By the time Martin's Department Store moved into the second floor in the 1920s, three staircases connected the first floor and balcony. The first floor was described in the Brooklyn Daily Times as having "gleaming white Corinthian pillars support[ing] a richly ornamented ceiling" measuring 21 feet (6.4 m) high.

The building had two basement levels which extended 23 feet (7.0 m) deep. In the first basement were the cut-glass and bric-à-brac departments. Toys, dolls, and games were sold in a 100-by-100-foot (30 by 30 m) room in the northern part of the Duffield Street wing. On the second basement were the boilers, engines, dynamos, and elevator pumps. The boilers occupied a vault directly under the sidewalk of Fulton Street. Two goods lifts connected the second basement directly with the street. The second basement level housed offices for the credit department, cashiers, the head delivery clerk, the delivery department, and the timekeeper's office. This level also had the lunch rooms, the employee locker rooms, and a crockery delivery room. A stairway led from the second basement directly to a raised platform on the first basement level.

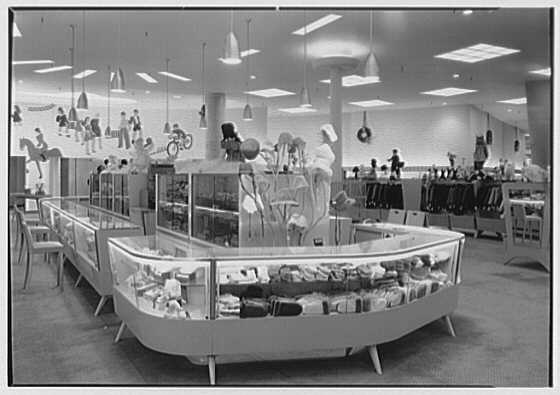
Interior of the store when it was being used as a Martin's location from the 1920s to the 1970s

The second story contained the children's, underwear, millinery, and ready-made costume departments. A portion of the second floor, above the women's parlor, was raised by 3 feet (0.91 m) and housed the millinery department; various types of clothing were sold throughout the rest of the third floor. The next three floors housed upholstery and furniture departments. When Bauland's store took over the building in the late 1890s, some of these departments were relocated or expanded. By 1900, the second floor housed an art gallery, and the third and fifth floors were devoted exclusively to groceries.

On the sixth floor were storerooms, receiving rooms, fur storage, supply rooms, and window dressing rooms, as well as the advertising department and private offices for the firms. The seventh floor was used for private events and manufacturing, while the eighth floor was an observatory. The upper stories were used entirely as offices after 1909.

==== Current use ====
The basement of the Offerman Building, and the first and second floors of both the original structure and the Bridge Street annex, operate as commercial space and are arranged in an open plan. The first and second floors of the original building are attached to the Bridge Street wing to the west. In the westernmost bay on Fulton Street is an entrance with escalators, a stair, and an elevator. The rest of the retail space has been redecorated over the years with tiled floors and drywall walls and ceilings. The first and second stories of the original building have cast iron columns, which date to the building's opening in 1891; the decorations on these columns were removed during the 1940s renovation.

The southernmost bay on Duffield Street leads to the residential lobby. The original rotunda was restored during the 2010s. On each floor, there is a north-south corridor in the Duffield Street wing and a west-east corridor in the Fulton Street wing, which intersect at the central rotunda. The hallways have carpeted floors and metal doorways leading to apartments on either side. At alternating floors, the rotunda has been glassed-in as a fire-safety measure. The apartments themselves range from studio apartments to three-bedroom units. Inside each apartment, the floors are made of hardwood, except in the kitchens and bathrooms, where there are tiled floors. There are also baseboards and trim made of wood, as well as some of the original cast-iron columns, which have lost their original trims. In both the hallways and apartments, the walls and ceilings are gypsum (i.e. drywall). There are 121 apartments in total.

During the 2010s renovation of the upper stories, some of the spaces were converted into residents' amenity areas such as a fitness room, kitchen, and lounge. In addition, the roof contains a landscaped terrace with seats.

== History ==
The building was developed by Brooklyn Sugar Refining Company president Henry Offerman. Its first occupant was S. Wechsler & Brother, established by brothers Samuel and Hermann Wechsler in 1868. S. Wechsler & Bro., originally headquartered at 293–295 Fulton Street, subsequently expanded to 297–299 Fulton Street. By the late 1880s, the store required yet more space for its expanding operations.

=== Development and opening ===
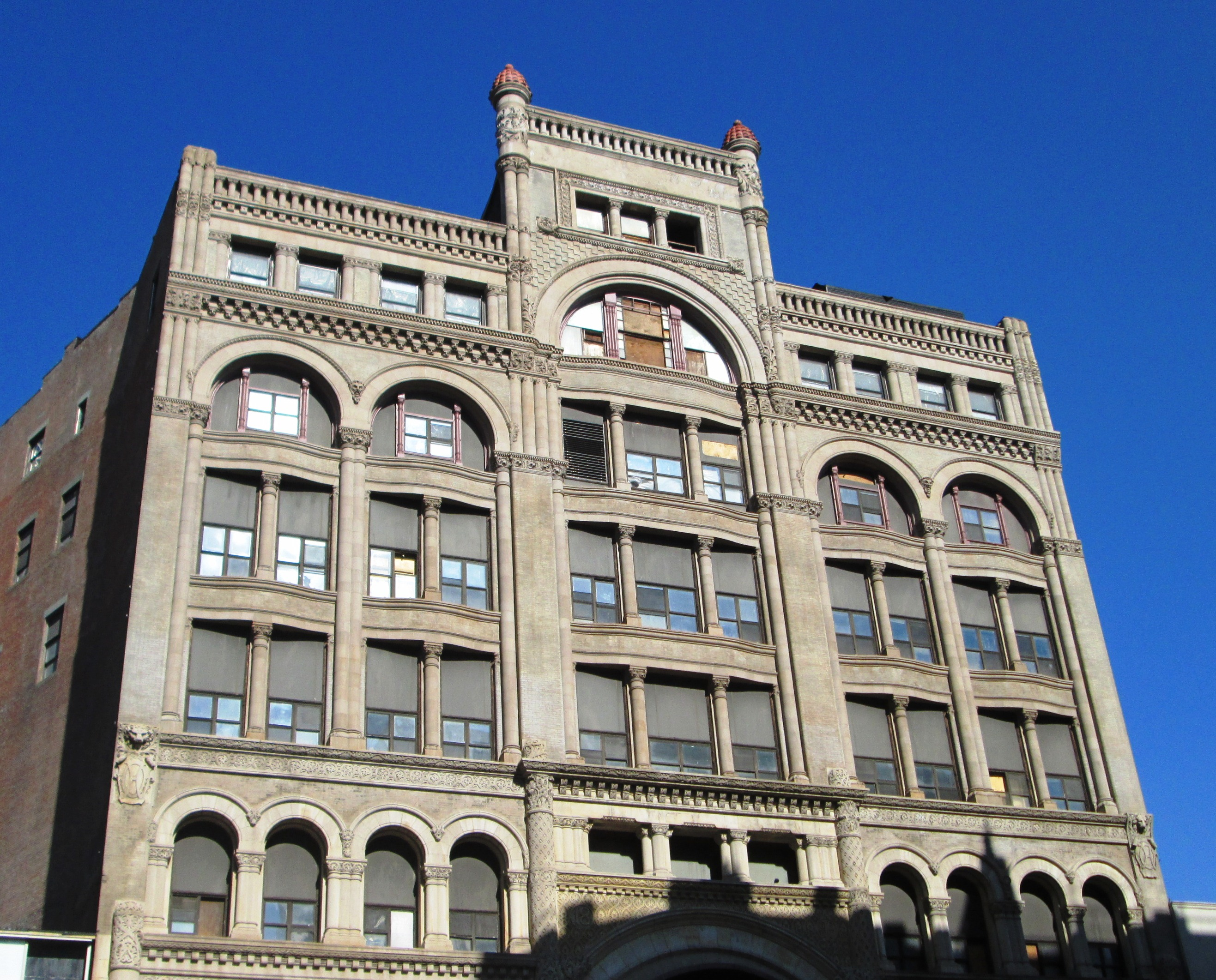
Fulton Street facade

During 1889, Offerman and real estate agent Frank A. Barnaby had discussed the feasibility of erecting a seven-story building at the corner of Fulton and Duffield Streets. That November, Barnaby agreed to lease the entire building to dry goods department store S. Wechsler & Brother for 12 years, and Offerman agreed to erect a five-story building on the site. The lease was officially announced the next month. Barnaby acquired nine lots: six at 503–513 Fulton Street and three at 240–244 Duffield Street. The site cost $235,000, which the Brooklyn Daily Eagle characterized as "a low figure, as the locality is one of the best for business purposes". The Brooklyn Building Department issued a construction permit for the building in May 1890, and William and Thomas Lamb began erecting the structure the same month. Shortly before construction began, Offerman sued Barnaby, claiming that two of the Duffield Street plots could have been acquired at a lower price.

S. Wechsler & Son closed its original store on April 28, 1891, and reopened at the Offerman Building three days later, on May 1. To promote its new building, S. Wechsler & Brother printed pamphlets with color photographs of the structure and its interior, and it distributed these pamphlets to customers. The store was so popular that, by 1892, the owners had decided to acquire several additional lots on Duffield Street, measuring a total of 87 feet (27 m) wide and 100 ft (30 m) deep. The extra land was used to provide more loading bays and commercial space. S. Wechsler & Bro.'s owners raised additional capital and hired C. Henry Offerman, the son of the building's owner, to raise money for the expansion. After the younger Offerman was hired, the Wechsler store became Wechsler Bros. & Co. in October 1892. By that December, the store's annex had opened. The store's book department was expanded into the balcony in late 1894.

Wechsler Bros. & Co. only lasted for three years. In September 1895, a week before the partnership agreement was to expire, Samuel and Hermann Wechsler and C. Henry Offerman suddenly decided to dissolve their partnership, and all of the company's stock was liquidated. Henry Offerman, who still owned the building, took over the store's operation. The elder Offerman began hosting exhibitions at the building, such as a showcase of oil paintings. Henry Offerman died in April 1896, less than a year after taking over the store. The trustees of Offerman's estate decided to sell the building's lease and the Offerman store to Joseph Bauland in March 1897, paying $500,000 each for the lease and store. Bauland had been visiting the area from Chicago, and broker Leonard Moody had convinced Bauland to open a store within the Offerman Building.

=== Late 1890s to early 1920s ===
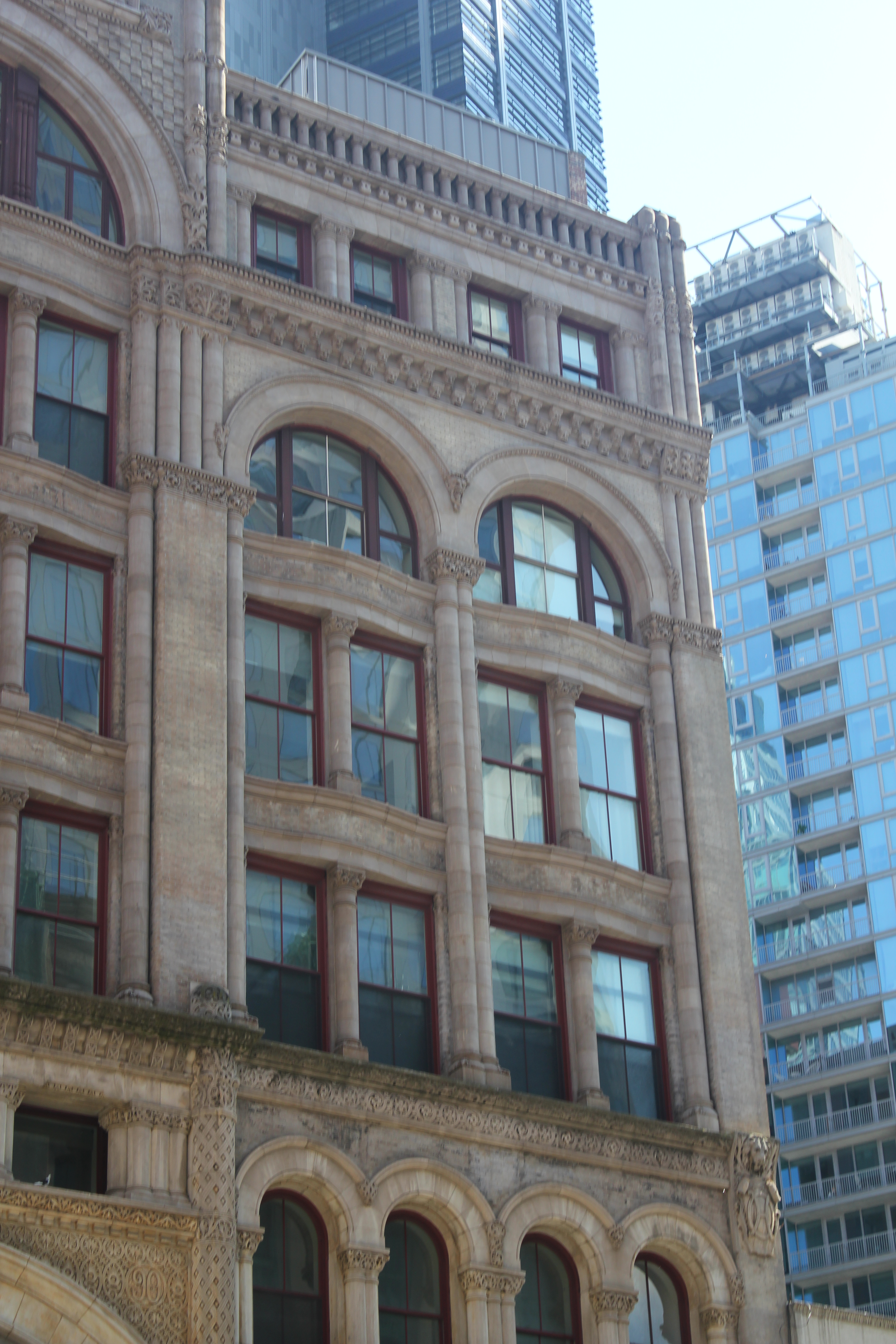
The eastern portion of the Fulton Street facade

Bauland remodeled the store to make room for several new or enlarged departments, such as sewing and grocery departments. The millinery department was expanded fourfold, and three elevators were added. The rebuilt store opened in mid-March 1897 as Joseph H. Bauland's Great Cash Store. Under Bauland's operation, the store hosted events such as food exhibits and doll receptions. By its second anniversary in 1899, the store was one of Brooklyn's most popular dry-goods stores. Bauland acquired several buildings on Fulton and Bridge Streets, opening a 30,000-square-foot (2,800 m^{2}) annex within these buildings in October 1899. The annex provided space for multiple new and expanded departments of the store, in addition to a restaurant, beauty salons, and photography studios. Further growth in Bauland's business prompted him to open a grocery department on the third and fifth floors in October 1900. By the next year, Bauland's store was four times as profitable as the Wechslers' store had been at its peak.

Chapman & Co., operated by longtime Bauland employee William H. Chapman, acquired the store from Bauland in the beginning of 1903 and began renovating it. The store began hosting events such as food shows and women's hat shows. Chapman & Co. moved their store to Manhattan in January 1907, as the lease of the Offerman Building was about to expire. The building was then acquired by businessman Ralph Leininger, who incorporated the Kingston Realty Company with $1,000 in paid-in capital and a valuation of $1 million. Leininger had intended to operate the Darlington department store within the Offerman Building, renovating the interiors to designs by "experts from Paris". The second floor of the Darlington store was supposed to contain a sizable silk and dress-goods department on the second floor. Leininger spent $75,000 renovating the building before announcing in September 1907 that the store's opening, which had been planned for the next month, had been delayed indefinitely. The deputy sheriff of Brooklyn seized the building and the store's assets shortly thereafter.

For the next two years, the Offerman Building remained closed while it underwent extensive renovations. The structure reopened as an office building in 1909, with some stores remaining on the ground story. One of the building's retail establishments, a restaurant named Silsbe, installed a marquee above its space at some point after 1909. Decoration firm Robert Griffin Co. leased the second floor in 1911 and opened a showroom there. By the 1910s, the tax department of the government of New York City had offices in the Offerman Building, occupying four stories there. The city government also planned to move additional offices to the Offerman Building, but the New York City Comptroller blocked these plans. The ground floor of the Offerman Building was occupied by several stores, including the United Cigar Stores, while the New York City government occupied about 150,000 square feet (14,000 m^{2}) on the upper stories.

=== Martin's occupancy ===
==== 1920s and 1930s ====
In July 1922, Martin's Department Store bought the Offerman Building from the Offerman estate, along with an adjacent three-story building at 237 Duffield Street, for nearly $1 million. Martin's, operated by the Zeitz family, had occupied the corner of Fulton and Bridge Streets since 1904, and it planned to raze its existing structure after moving into the Offerman Building. Martin's bought out Silsbe's lease, for 26,000 square feet (2,400 m^{2}) of ground-floor space, in May 1924 and spent over $300,000 on renovations over the next several months. The new store opened in November 1924. The next year, Martin's opened a ready-to-wear clothing department in the basement and a merchandise receiving department on the fifth floor. The company also decided to take over the space used by various city offices. Three more departments of the store opened in early 1926, and a sprinkler system was installed throughout the building the same year. Martin's occupied the entire ground story by September 1926, after Bickford's and United Cigar Stores had moved out. The extra ground-floor space was occupied by the women's shoe department and the men's furnishing department.

The company expanded its infants' clothing department to the Offerman Building's mezzanine in 1928, and Martin's had built its "men's corner" at Bridge and Fulton Streets by the next year. The store was initially successful because of its location in Downtown Brooklyn, with $5 million in annual profits by 1930. The city government briefly considered leasing space for a municipal courthouse within the Offerman Building in 1930 before canceling their plans later that year. The building's owner Martin Securities Company then unsuccessfully sued to force the city to lease space there. Martin's enlarged its children's and women's clothing departments, relocating these divisions to the second floor, in 1938.

==== 1940s to 1970s ====
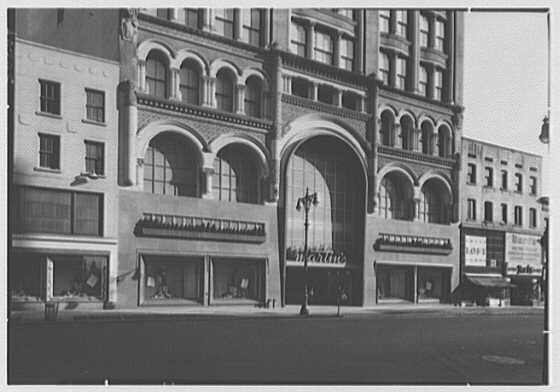
Lapidus's renovation of the first two stories on Fulton Street in 1947

Martin's shared the Offerman Building with the Michael Bros. store; by 1945, Martin's officials were considering expanding their store to the fourth floor, using space occupied by Michael Bros. The store's operators hired Morris Lapidus, a then-little-known architect who had started his own firm in 1944. According to a 1979 autobiography by Lapidus, the renovation of Martin's was his first major solo project. Martin's president Fred Zeitz wanted any architect to remain associated with the store for the long term, and Lapidus agreed, as he had no other clients at the time. The fourth-floor expansion was renovated in a modern style and opened in October 1945 as a children's department. Later that year, Zeitz announced plans to expand the store by 60,000 square feet (5,600 m^{2}) after Michaels Bros. relocated to another structure. Martin's stopped operating its basement store in 1946 and further expanded the men's and shoe departments in 1947. Lapidus also redesigned the Offerman Building's facade on Fulton Street in March 1947, re-cladding the first two stories in Swedish granite and adding a red-granite arch.

Lapidus remained associated with Martin's through the late 1950s, over a dozen years after his original commission for the company. Martin's had three additional stores on eastern Long Island by the 1960s, but it continued to operate its flagship store at the Offerman Building. The store's continued presence in the Offerman Building led The New York Times to describe Martin's as "an oasis of calm" in 1966. At the time, Martin's Offerman Building store occupied 225,000 square feet (20,900 m^{2}) and used five of the seven floors for selling goods; the store's Fulton Street location alone was making an annual profit of $15 million per year. Compared with competitors on Fulton Street, Martin's remained successful in part because it focused on providing customers full service, similar to the upscale stores on Manhattan's Fifth Avenue. As such, Martin's Offerman Building store employed 900 people by the late 1960s.

Martin's business began to decline in the 1970s. The store remained one of the four largest department stores on Fulton Street in Downtown Brooklyn, which was renovated into a pedestrian plaza named Fulton Mall in the mid-1970s. The Seedman Manufacturing Group had bought the Martin's chain in 1977; in an unsuccessful attempt to attract buyers, they started selling lower-quality and cheaper products at the Offerman Building location. In February 1979, Martin's opened a section for "budget items" on the building's second and third floors. Seedman announced in April 1979 that it would close Martin's Offerman Building store, saying the store was unprofitable. At the time, the number of employees at that location had declined to 250 or 350. Seedman also planned to sell off the Offerman Building and focus on its remaining locations.

=== Laboz ownership ===
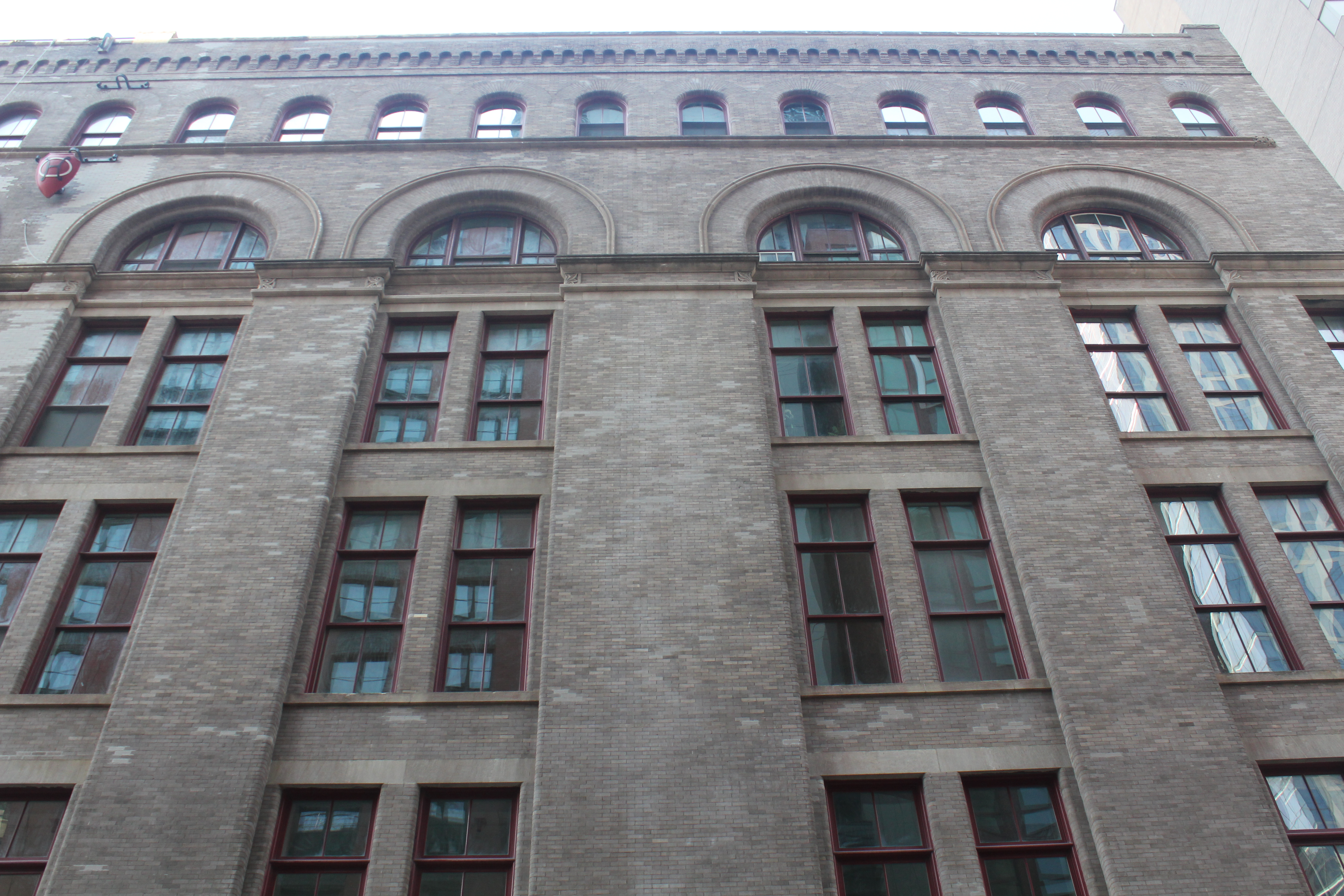
The upper portion of the Duffield Street facade

Shortly after the Martin's store closed, Rentar Development Corp. and Times Square Stores offered to acquire the Offerman Building, with the intention of razing it and developing a new building for Alexander's department store on the site. They were beat out by Richard Carroll, a developer who planned to divide the building into "a number of national chain stores". Albert Laboz bought the building in 1979 through his company United American Land, and he and his younger brothers Jason and Jody subsequently operated the structure. The structure's interior was renovated extensively during the 1980s. By 1986, the New York City Transit Authority's transit court operated within the building. Discount store Conway's also occupied the building for more than twenty years, until 2010.

The Municipal Art Society's Preservation Committee, along with local civic group Brooklyn Heights Association, began petitioning the New York City Landmarks Preservation Commission (LPC) to designate over two dozen buildings in Downtown Brooklyn as landmarks in 2003. Among these structures was the Offerman Building, which was designated as a New York City landmark in March 2005. The following year, Al Laboz said some of the upper-story offices had been sealed for forty to fifty years. The building was added to the National Register of Historic Places on February 21, 2017.

==== New stores ====
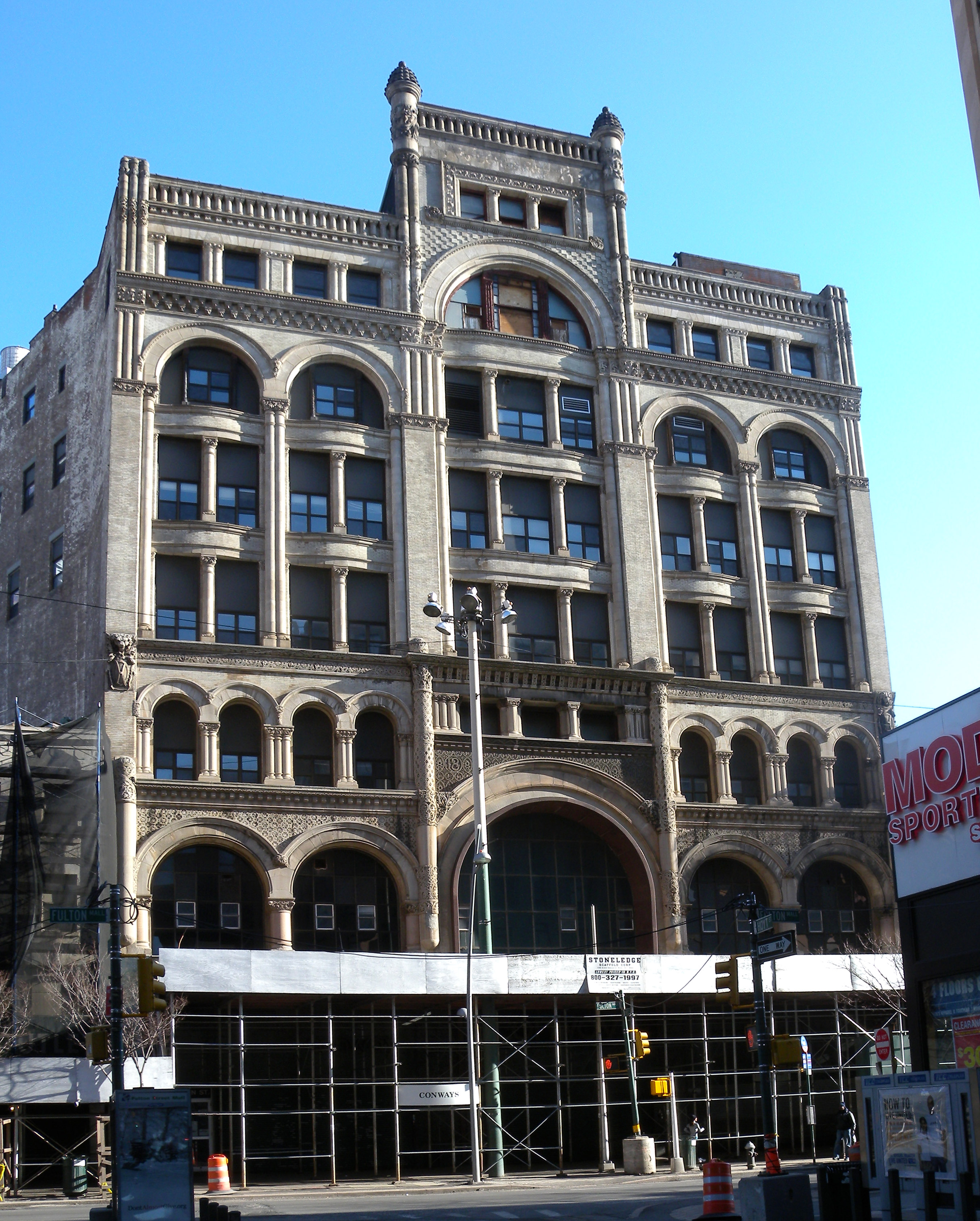
The building seen in 2010

Al Laboz, who was a chairman of Fulton Mall, announced in 2005 that he wanted to redevelop the mall with new stores. As part of this redevelopment, clothing store H&M announced in June 2008 that it would move into the ground floor of a neighboring retail structure at 497 Fulton Street that Laboz, planned to develop. H&M officially signed a lease for the space that November, and clearing of the site at 497 Fulton Street began in 2011. United American Land began renovating 505 Fulton Street and constructing a three-story building at 497 Fulton Street, with a connection between the two structures at the second floor. The opening of the H&M store was delayed because United American Land had to negotiate with the Metropolitan Transportation Authority, which operated the Hoyt Street subway station. The H&M store ultimately opened in July 2013.

H&M's lease only covered 35,000 square feet (3,300 m^{2}) in the basement and first story, and Laboz sought to lease out the remaining 46,000 square feet (4,300 m^{2}) of retail space in the building. Around the same time that the H&M store opened, Nordstrom Rack announced in 2013 that it would operate a 41,000-square-foot (3,800 m^{2}) store on the second floor of 497 and 505 Fulton Street, making it the Nordstrom chain's first Brooklyn store. Nordstrom Rack opened in May 2014, followed the same year by TJ Maxx. Also in 2014, United American Land received a $65 million loan to refinance the retail space on the lowest stories. Clothing-store chain Old Navy had also opened a store at the Offerman Building by the late 2010s.

==== Conversion of upper-story space ====
Since at least 2005, Al Laboz had indicated that he wished to convert the upper stories to loft apartments, similar to those that he and his brothers had developed in the SoHo and Tribeca neighborhoods of Manhattan. By 2011, United American Land had finalized plans to convert the Offerman Building's upper stories into upscale residences. Al Laboz also negotiated with an unidentified institution to lease 150,000 square feet (14,000 m^{2}) of space on the upper stories. The Laboz brothers began renovating the upper stories of the Offerman Building into 120 residential lofts, adding a residential entrance on Duffield Street, in the early 2010s. GreenbergFarrow designed the renovation. Although the Offerman Building's residential conversion was supposed to have been completed at the end of 2014, the project was still not finished two years later. Sales of the residences on the upper stories, branded as the Offerman House, began in mid-2017.

== Critical reception ==
When the building opened, the Brooklyn Times Union wrote that the edifice was a "palatial building". The Brooklyn Daily Eagle wrote: "The splendid Fulton Street front and the fine facade on Duffield Street, vast and fine as they are, still do not prepare one fully for the great proportions and elegant vistas of interior." The Eagle wrote in 1892 that the building's arch "is majestic in its proportions and greatly enhances the beautiful effect of the building". Architectural writer Francis Morrone wrote in 2011 that "both the Fulton and the Duffield Street facades are Romanesque Revival extravaganzas" but that the Duffield Street facade was designed in a "much more austere manner" than that on Fulton Street. Lore Croghan of the Eagle wrote in 2016 that "the Offerman Building is a tasty piece of Romanesque Revival-style eye candy".

== See also ==
- List of New York City Designated Landmarks in Brooklyn
- National Register of Historic Places listings in Brooklyn
