= Grand Opera House (Brooklyn) =

Theater in Brooklyn, New York (1881–1920)

Coordinates: 40°41′23.5″N 73°59′5″W

The Grand Opera House was a theatre in Brooklyn, New York that was in operation from 1881 through 1920. The theatre was demolished in 1924 along with several adjacent buildings to make room for the A. I. Namm & Son Department Store.

== History ==
The Grand Opera House was built by the firm of Barry, Fay & Lewis; a partnership which consisted of theatrical impresario Benjamin Lewis (died 1905), and Irish comedic actors Hugo Fay and Billy Barry. The theater was constructed at 14 Elm Place, on the west side of the street just south of Fulton Ave. It was built on the former site of the Congregational Church on Elm Pl. which had been destroyed by fire in June 1880.

The Grand Opera House was inaugurated on Monday, November 14, 1881, with a performance of Muldoon's Picnic. Seating 2,000 people, at the time it opened it was the second largest theatre in Brooklyn; with only the Brooklyn Academy of Music surpassing its size. The theatre was purchased by the firm of Hyde and Benham in 1882. In 1907 it was acquired by Klaw and Erlanger for their chain of theatres, and the following year it became part of The Shubert Organization's chain of theatres. The building remained in operation as a theatre until 1920. The theatre, along with several adjacent buildings, was demolished in 1924 for the purposes of building the A. I. Namm & Son Department Store.
