= Hoyt Street station =

New York City Subway station in Brooklyn

Hoyt Street
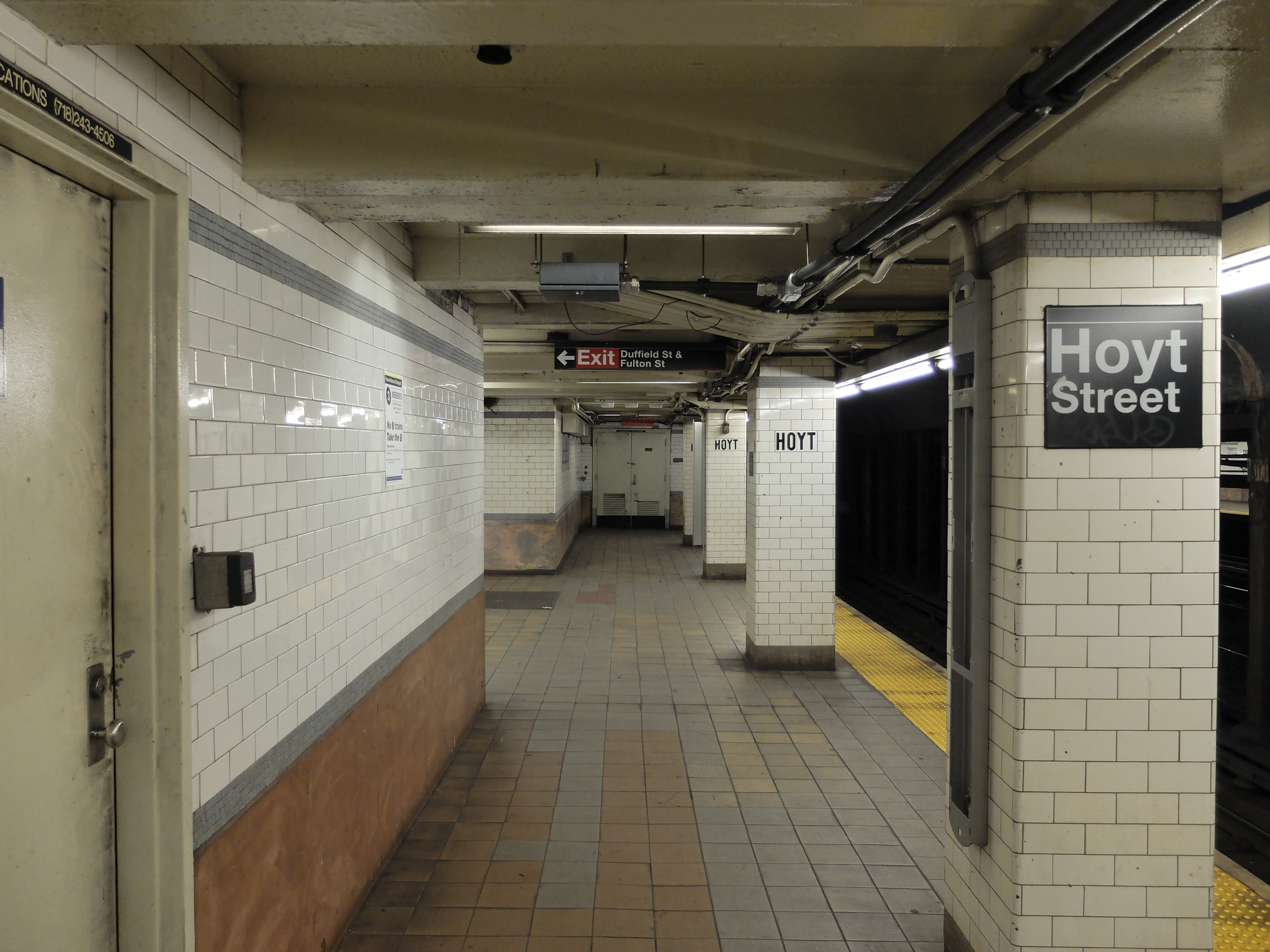
- Northbound platform

Station statistics
- Address: Hoyt Street & Fulton Street; Brooklyn, New York
- Borough: Brooklyn
- Locale: Downtown Brooklyn
- Coordinates: 40.690531°N 73.985109°W
- Division: A (IRT)
- Line: IRT Eastern Parkway Line
- Services: 2 (all times); 3 (all except late nights)
- Transit: NYCT Bus: B25, B26, B38, B41, B45, B52, B54, B57, B62, B67; MTA Bus: B103
- Structure: Underground
- Platforms: 2 side platforms
- Tracks: 4

Other information
- Opened: May 1, 1908; 118 years ago
- Accessible: Partially; full access planned (southbound platform accessible via elevator)
- Former/other names: Hoyt Street – Fulton Mall; Hoyt Street – Bridge Street

Traffic
- 2025: 1,825,757 ▼5.8%
- Rank: 195 out of 423
Services
Preceding station	New York City Subway	Following station
Borough Hall 2 3 via 135th Street	Local	Nevins Street 2 3 via Franklin Avenue–Medgar Evers College
and do not stop here
Location
Location within New York City Subway
Location within New York City
Location within New York
Track layout
Street map
Station service legend
Symbol	Description
Stops all times except late nights	Stops all times except late nights
Stops all times	Stops all times
Stops weekdays during the day	Stops weekdays during the day
Stops weekdays and weekday late nights	Stops weekdays and weekday late nights

The Hoyt Street station (signed as Hoyt Street–Bridge Street and Hoyt Street–Fulton Mall) is a local station on the IRT Eastern Parkway Line of the New York City Subway in Downtown Brooklyn. Located under the intersection of Fulton Street, Hoyt Street, and Bridge Street, the station is served by the 2 train at all times and the 3 train at all times except late nights.

== History ==
=== Construction ===
Planning for a subway line in New York City dates to 1864. However, development of what would become the city's first subway line did not start until 1894, when the New York State Legislature passed the Rapid Transit Act. The subway plans were drawn up by a team of engineers led by William Barclay Parsons, the Rapid Transit Commission's chief engineer. The Rapid Transit Construction Company, organized by John B. McDonald and funded by August Belmont Jr., signed the initial Contract 1 with the Rapid Transit Commission in February 1900, in which it would construct the subway and maintain a 50-year operating lease from the opening of the line. In 1901, the firm of Heins & LaFarge was hired to design the underground stations. Belmont incorporated the Interborough Rapid Transit Company (IRT) in April 1902 to operate the subway.

Several days after Contract 1 was signed, the Board of Rapid Transit Railroad Commissioners instructed Parsons to evaluate the feasibility of extending the subway south to South Ferry, and then to Brooklyn. On January 24, 1901, the Board adopted a route that would extend the subway from City Hall to the Long Island Rail Road (LIRR)'s Flatbush Avenue terminal station (now known as Atlantic Terminal) in Brooklyn, via the Joralemon Street Tunnel under the East River. Contract 2, which gave the IRT a 35-year lease, was executed between the commission and the Rapid Transit Construction Company on September 11, 1902. Work under Fulton Street and Flatbush Avenue in Brooklyn commenced in April 1904. The IRT line in Brooklyn had been proposed with two tracks, as engineers originally did not think it was feasible to build four tracks under Fulton Street. Belmont submitted a revised proposal to the Rapid Transit Commission in April 1905 to widen the line to four tracks. Because of the narrowness of Fulton Street, as well as the fact that there would be an express station at the intersection of Flatbush Avenue and Fulton Street, the plan called for constructing the Hoyt Street station as a local station.

=== Opening and early history ===
The first station on the line in Brooklyn, Borough Hall, opened on January 9, 1908. An extension to Atlantic Avenue, including a station at Hoyt Street, opened on May 1, 1908, completing the Contract 2 IRT line. Initially, the station was served by express trains along both the West Side (now the Broadway–Seventh Avenue Line to Van Cortlandt Park–242nd Street) and East Side (now the Lenox Avenue Line). The express trains, running to Atlantic Avenue, had their northern terminus at 242nd Street or West Farms (180th Street). Lenox local trains to 145th Street served the station during late nights.

After the original IRT opened, the city began planning new lines. In 1913, as part of the Dual Contracts, the New York City Public Service Commission planned to split the original IRT system into three segments: two north-south lines, carrying through trains over the Lexington Avenue and Broadway–Seventh Avenue Lines, and an east–west shuttle under 42nd Street. This would form a roughly H-shaped system. The Broadway–Seventh Avenue Line would split into two branches south of Chambers Street, one of which would turn eastward through Lower Manhattan, run under the East River via a new Clark Street Tunnel, and connect with the existing Contract 2 IRT Brooklyn Line at Borough Hall. Service increased after the opening of the Clark Street Tunnel on April 16, 1919. Trains using the Clark Street Tunnel began serving the Hoyt Street station at all times, while trains using the Joralemon Street Tunnel only served the station during off-peak hours.

=== Later years ===
An entrance from the A. I. Namm & Son Building, at the southeast corner of Fulton and Hoyt Streets, to the Hoyt Street station opened in November 1914, two months after Namm's and IRT officials signed an agreement for the subway entrance. Martin's Department Store, occupying the Offerman Building on the northern side of Fulton Street, built a 44-foot-wide (13 m) staircase leading to the station in 1923, on the site of its former store. The entrance had two large display windows at platform level, two windows at the top of the stairs, a bank of turnstiles, and a change booth for the store's customers. The House of Worth, a neighboring store at Fulton and Bridge Streets, opened an entrance from the basement of its store to the subway in 1925.

The city government took over the IRT's operations on June 12, 1940. In November 1946, the New York City Board of Transportation awarded a $733,200 contract for the lengthening of the Hoyt Street station's platforms. On February 2, 1948, the platform extensions at the Hoyt Street station opened, allowing 10-car express trains to board as opposed to only 6-car trains. Initially, the platforms were 360 feet (110 m), but they had been lengthened to 515 feet (157 m). The platform extensions were part of a program to lengthen the platforms at 32 of the original IRT station for $12.27 million. The Hoyt Street project cost $750,000.

The New York City Transit Authority (NYCTA) announced plans in 1956 to add fluorescent lights above the edges of the station's platforms. In 1981, the Metropolitan Transportation Authority (MTA) listed the station among the 69 most deteriorated stations in the subway system. In 1982, the Urban Mass Transportation Administration gave a $66 million grant to the New York City Transit Authority. Part of the grant was to be used for the renovation of several subway stations, including Hoyt Street. The renovation of the Hoyt Street station was funded as part of the MTA's 1980–1984 capital plan. The station was renovated around the 1980s.

In 1995, as a result of service reductions, the MTA was considering permanently closing the Hoyt Street station, as well as two or three other stations citywide, due to its proximity to other stations. An entrance to the southbound platform, with an elevator, opened in September 2023. The entrance's construction was funded entirely by Macy's department store, which owned the building above the entrance.

== Station layout ==
The Hoyt Street station is a standard local station with four tracks and two side platforms serving only the local tracks, and is the northernmost four-track station on this line. The station is between Borough Hall to the west (railroad north) and Nevins Street to the east (railroad south). The 2 stops here at all times and the 3 stops here except at night. Both trains run on the outer local tracks, which come from the Clark Street Tunnel. The two center express tracks, used by the 4 at all times and the 5 only on weekdays during the day, come from the Joralemon Street Tunnel. Fixed platform barriers, which are intended to prevent commuters falling to the tracks, are positioned near the platform edges.

The original construction included only the Joralemon Street Tunnel with crossover switches north of Hoyt Street. These switches have been removed and new ones were installed between Nevins Street and Atlantic Avenue, so trains from the Joralemon Street Tunnel cannot stop at this station at all. South of Borough Hall, the IRT Lexington Avenue Line and the Brooklyn Branch of the IRT Broadway–Seventh Avenue Line join to form the four-track IRT Eastern Parkway Line. Southbound (east Brooklyn-bound) trains use track E1 while northbound (Manhattan-bound) trains use track E4. Southbound and northbound express trains use tracks E2 and E3, respectively. Track numbers and letters are used for chaining purposes and are rarely, if ever, used by passengers.

=== Exits ===
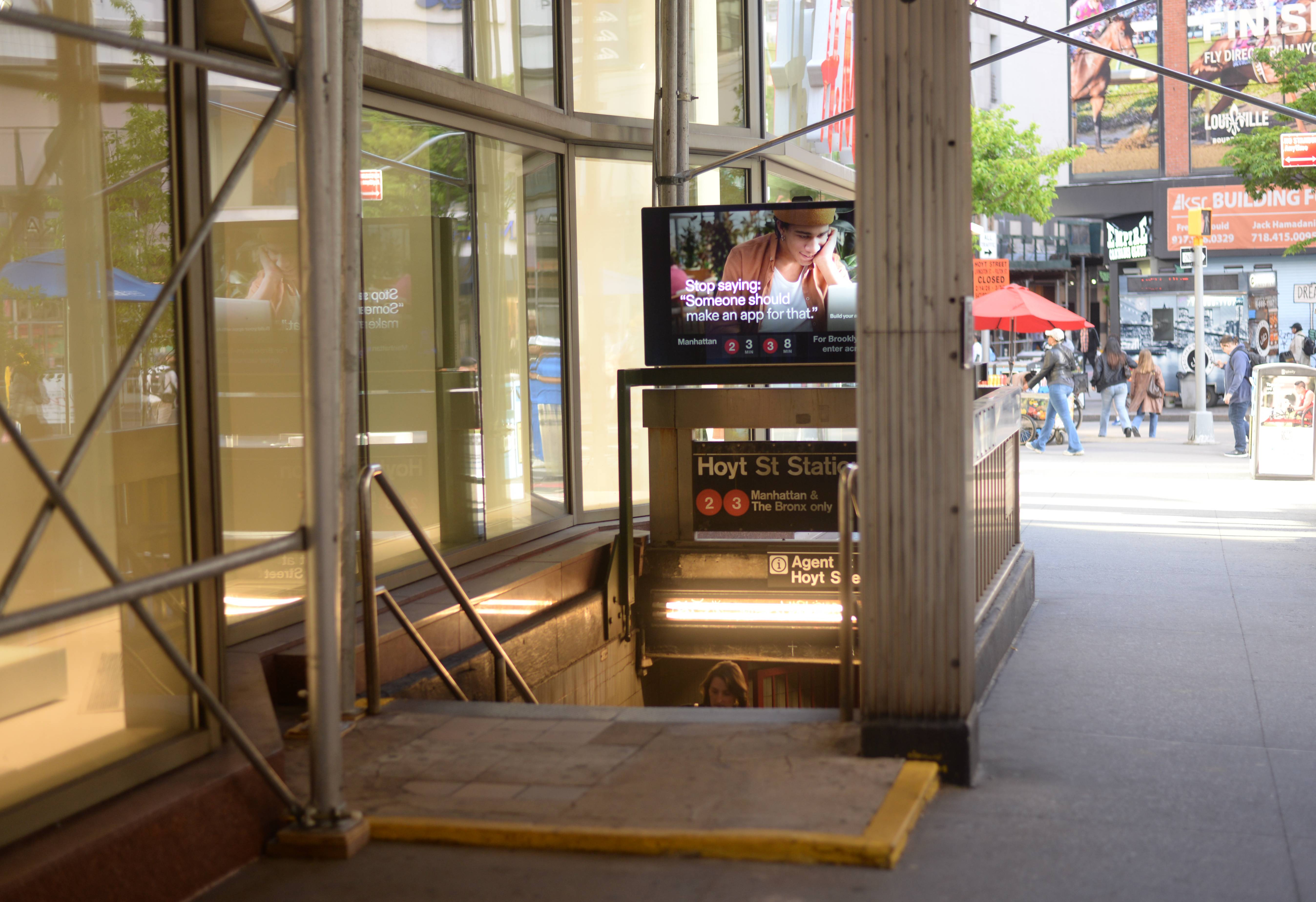
Northbound entrance at the corner of Bridge and Fulton St.

All fare control areas are on the respective platforms. The full-time fare control is at the west end of the station, and contains one token booth and a turnstile bank for each platform. The northbound platform has two exits, one to either northern corner of Bridge and Fulton Streets. The southbound platform has an exit to the southwest corner of Hoyt and Fulton Streets.

There is a part-time fare control area at the extreme eastern ends of both platforms. There are HEET turnstiles on both platforms. The southbound platform's exit leads to the southwest corner of Fulton Street and Elm Place, and the northbound platform's exit leads to the northeast corner of Duffield and Fulton Streets. The northbound platform's part-time fare control area also had an exit-only stair to the northwest corner of Duffield and Fulton Streets, but it was closed due to security concerns.

At the north end of the southbound platform is an entrance to Macy's (formerly Abraham & Straus); the entrance was closed for some time but reopened in September 2023 with an elevator. It formerly included a crossunder to the northbound platform.
