= Frederick Loeser & Co. =

Department store in Brooklyn, New York

- Industry: Retail
- Founded: Brooklyn, New York (1860; 166 years ago)
- Founder: Frederick Loeser
- Defunct: February 13, 1952; 74 years ago
- Fate: Bankrupt
- Number of locations: 5 (during peak)
- Area served: New York City
- Revenue: $25M (1951)
- Net income: -$600,000 (1951)
- Owner: Frederick Loeser
- Number of employees: 1,400 (1952)

Frederick Loeser & Co. was a large department store in Brooklyn, New York. Their flagship store on 484 Fulton Street served as one of Brooklyn's major landmarks for 65 years. The store closed down in February 1952.

== History ==
Founded in 1860 as Loeser and Dinkelspiel by German immigrant Frederick Loeser (1833-1911); the company started out as an embroidery and trimmings business. The original store was situated at 277 Fulton Street, roughly a block from Brooklyn Borough Hall. The company grew relatively quickly, buying out competitors and partners.

In 1870 the company opened a larger second store near the present-day intersection of Fulton Street and Boerum Place. In March 1887, the store was moved to 484 Fulton Street, a new five-story building. The building included all modern convenience including electric lights, telephone services, elevators, restrooms, fitting rooms, and luxury duplex escalators. The bottom three floors were used for sales, the fourth floor held administrative offices. The upper floor was used for restrooms, ladies' fitting rooms, buyer's samples, and various other applications.

In 1887, Scottish born Lace and fabric importer John Gibb entered into partnership with Frederick Loeser. Upon Loeser’s death in 1903, the Gibb family assumed ownership of the business. John Gibb’s son, Walter Gibb was the last of the Gibb brothers involved in the store, and when he died in 1912, his widow Florence Swan Gibb became its principal owner. The firm would expand to branches in Bay Shore and Garden City, Long Island, New York.

During the early 20th century, The company provided china for the immigration station at Ellis Island.

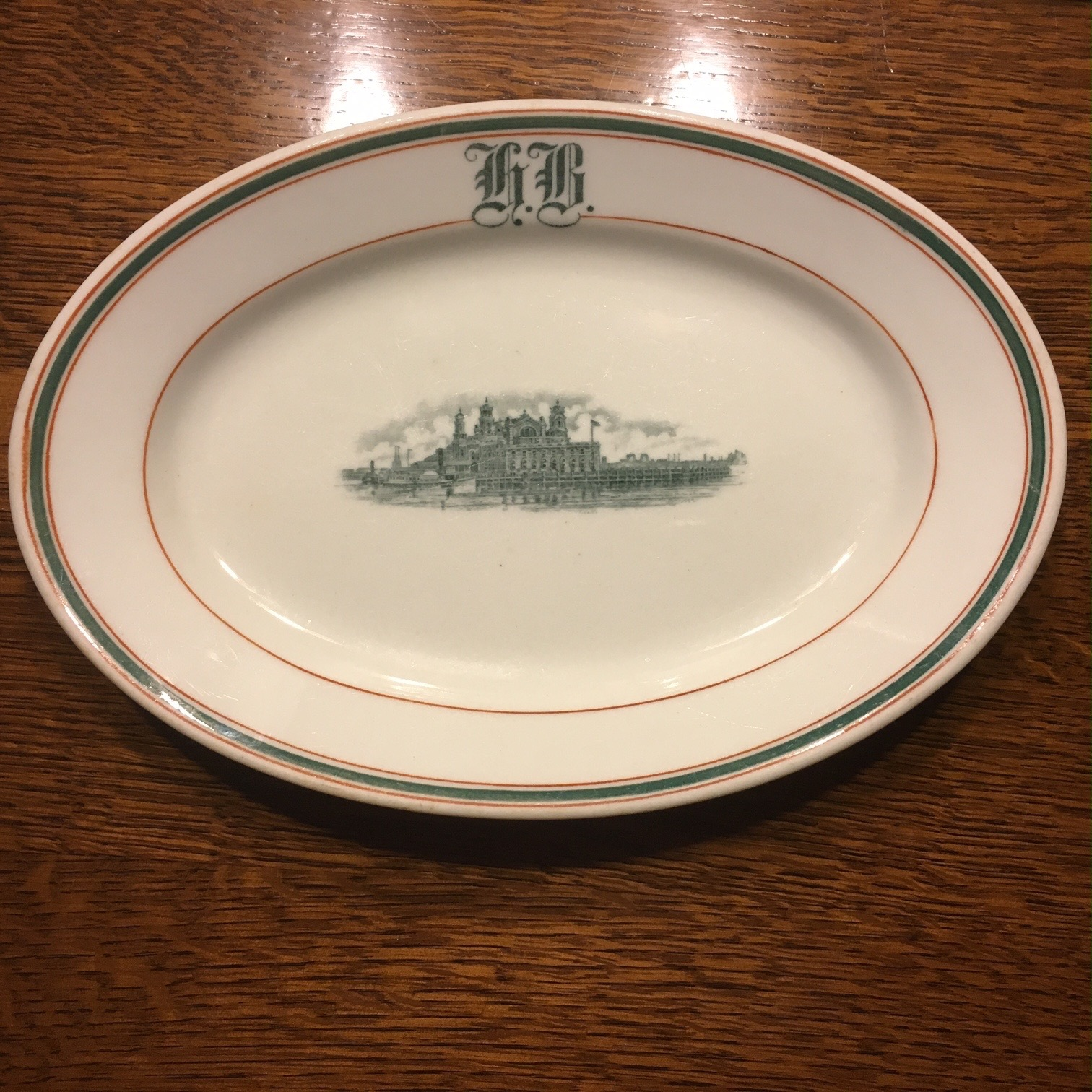
One of the pieces of china provided by Frederick Loeser & Co. for the immigration station at Ellis Island

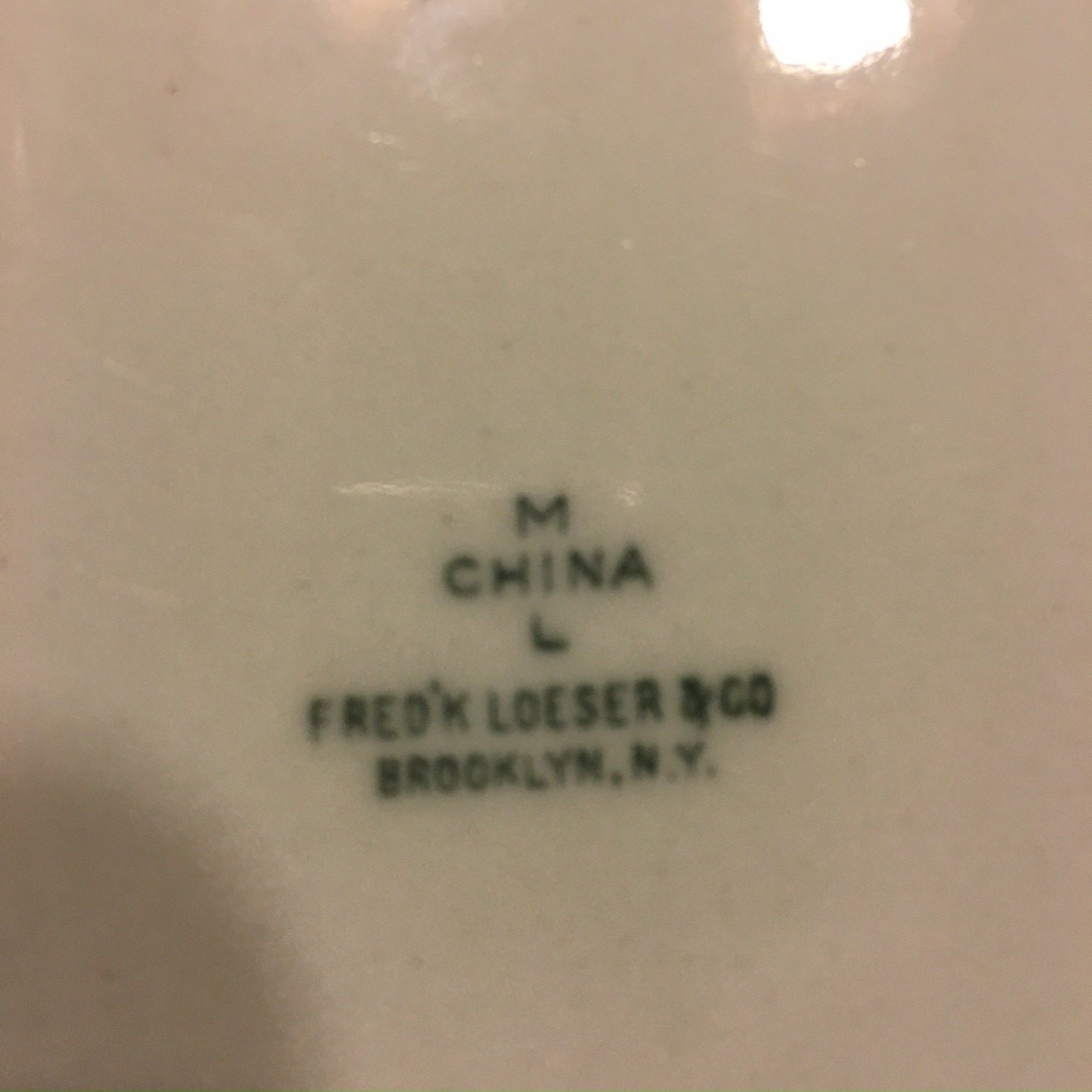
Stamped "Fred'k Loeser & Co"

In 1934-36, Lois Wilson was a sales clerk and interior decorator at Loeser's Department Store. Lois Wilson was the long-suffering wife of William Griffith Wilson (Bill W.), a co-founder of Alcoholics Anonymous.

In 1947, upon the death of Walter Gibb’s only child, Althea Gibb Hunter, the business was sold to a syndicate of investors for a reported $8 (~$88 million in 2024) Million. They would operate it until 1952 when, following two years of steep losses, it was closed. Following this, neighboring Brooklyn retailer A. I. Namm & Son purchased the trademark and goodwill of Frederick Loeser. They continued to operate under the Namm Loeser name until 1957 when the business closed, a victim of the flight of its customer base to the suburbs.
