= A. I. Namm & Son Department Store =

Building in Brooklyn, New York

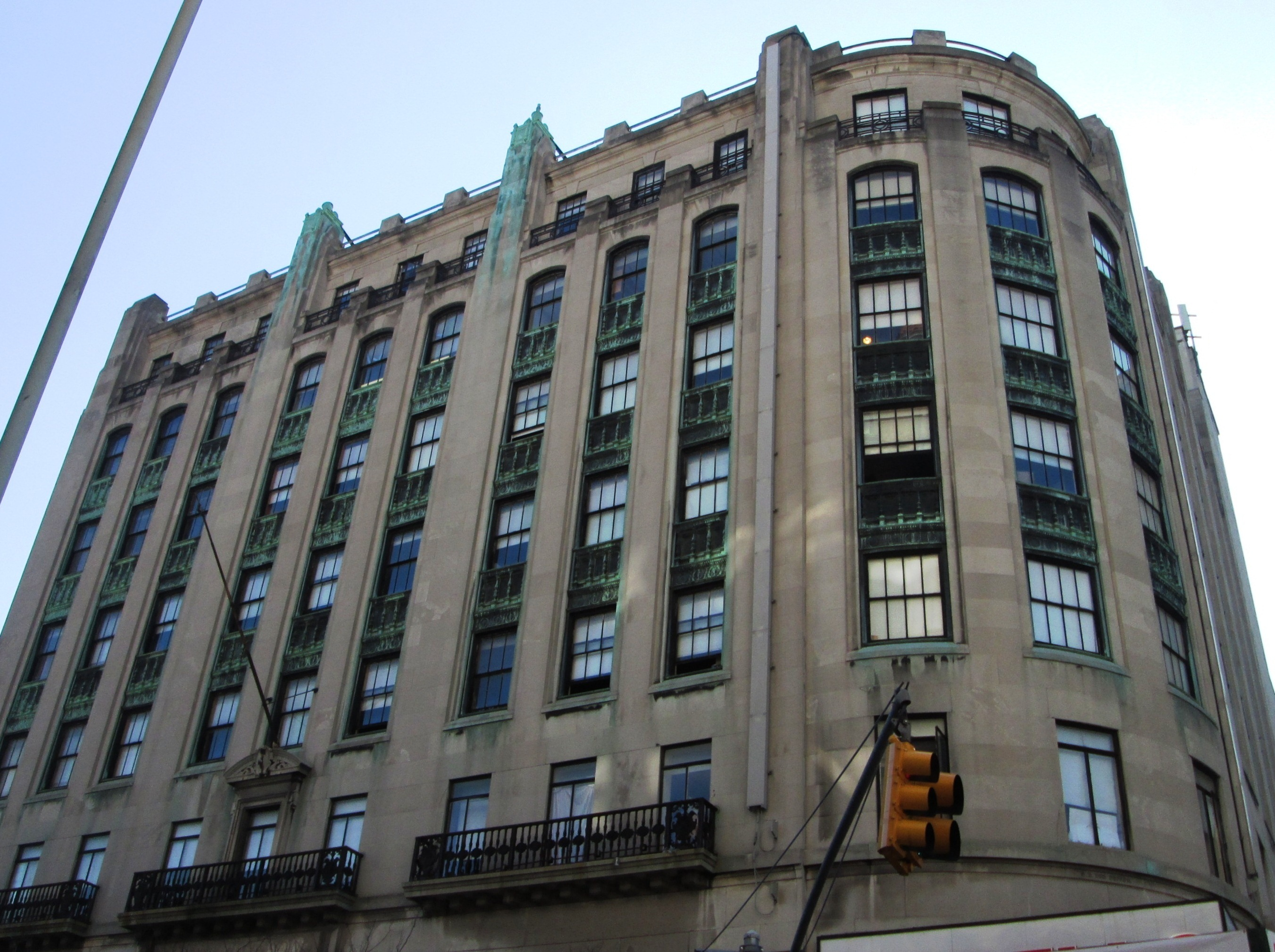
- Front of the building (2022)
- Interactive map of the A. I. Namm & Son Department Store area

General information
- Architectural style: Art Deco
- Location: 450–458 Fulton Street, Brooklyn, New York, United States
- Coordinates: 40°41′25″N 73°59′06″W
- Construction started: 1890 (original building); 1893–1921 (former annexes); May 1924 (current annex)
- Completed: February 4, 1925 (current annex)
- Demolished: 1957 (original building and annexes)

Technical details
- Floor count: 8

Design and construction
- Architects: Robert D. Kohn and Charles Butler (current annex)
- Main contractor: Thompson–Starrett Company (first section of current annex)

New York City Landmark
- Designated: March 15, 2005
- Reference no.: 2150
- Designated entity: Exterior

The A. I. Namm & Son Department Store is a commercial structure at 450–458 Fulton Street, at the southeast corner with Hoyt Street, in the Downtown Brooklyn neighborhood of New York City, United States. It is the last remaining structure of a complex of buildings constructed for the A. I. Namm & Son Department Store chain. The current structure, built in 1924–1925 and expanded in 1928–1929, is eight stories tall and was designed by Robert D. Kohn and Charles Butler in the Art Deco style. It is a New York City designated landmark.

The A. I. Namm & Son store was founded in 1876 by the Polish immigrant Adolph I. Namm in Manhattan's Ladies Mile district. Namm moved to Brooklyn in 1885, and the store moved to the intersection of Fulton and Hoyt streets in 1890. The store expanded several times over the next three decades, covering nearly the entire city block. By the 1920s, it was one of the United States' largest cash-only department stores. The current structure replaced Namm's original building on the site when it was completed in February 1925, and it was expanded in November 1929. The buildings underwent several renovations between the 1930s and the 1950s. After Namm's merged with Frederick Loeser & Co. in the 1950s, the Namm-Loeser chain closed its former Brooklyn store. Most of the site was razed in 1957, while the remainder of the building operated as an Abraham & Straus store until 1980. Since then, the structure has been resold several times.

When the current buildings were completed, few contemporary architectural publications wrote about the structures. The facade of the current building is divided horizontally into four sections and includes decorative features such as pilasters, balconies, and pediments. As built, the first two stories were clad in bronze and stone, while the upper stories were clad in limestone. There is a curved corner at the intersection of Fulton and Hoyt streets, and the building originally had a large entrance on Fulton Street. Inside, the basement and several above-ground stories were used as sales floors, while the upper stories had inventory rooms and offices. The previous buildings on the site contained additional selling space for the A. I. Namm store.

== Site ==
The A. I. Namm & Son Department Store building is located at 1 Hoyt Street, at the southeastern corner of Hoyt Street and Fulton Street, in the Downtown Brooklyn neighborhood of New York City. It occupies a mostly rectangular land lot on the city block bounded by Fulton Street to the north, Hoyt Street to the west, Livingston Street to the south, and Elm Place to the east. The lot has an area of 8,837 square feet (821.0 m^{2}), with a frontage of 112.6 feet (34.3 m) on Hoyt Street and 95.4 feet (29.1 m) on Fulton Street, Nearby buildings include 388 Bridge Street to the northwest, the Offerman Building to the north, and 11 Hoyt to the south. In addition, the entrances to the New York City Subway's Hoyt Street station are next to the building.

== History ==
The A. I. Namm store's namesake and founder was Polish immigrant Adolph I. Namm, who opened a trimmings store within the Ladies' Mile in Manhattan, at Sixth Avenue and 18th Street, in 1876. Namm relocated to 286 Fulton Street in Brooklyn during 1885, and he then moved to 335–337 Fulton Street two years later. At the time, many of Brooklyn's largest stores were located on "lower Fulton Street", near Fulton Ferry, while Namm's was located on what the public commonly considered as "upper Fulton Street". 335–337 Fulton Street, a four-story brick edifice, was severely damaged in a fire in December 1890. Namm was already considering relocating to another structure; the fire prompted him to move "uptown" to Hoyt Street.

=== Earlier buildings ===
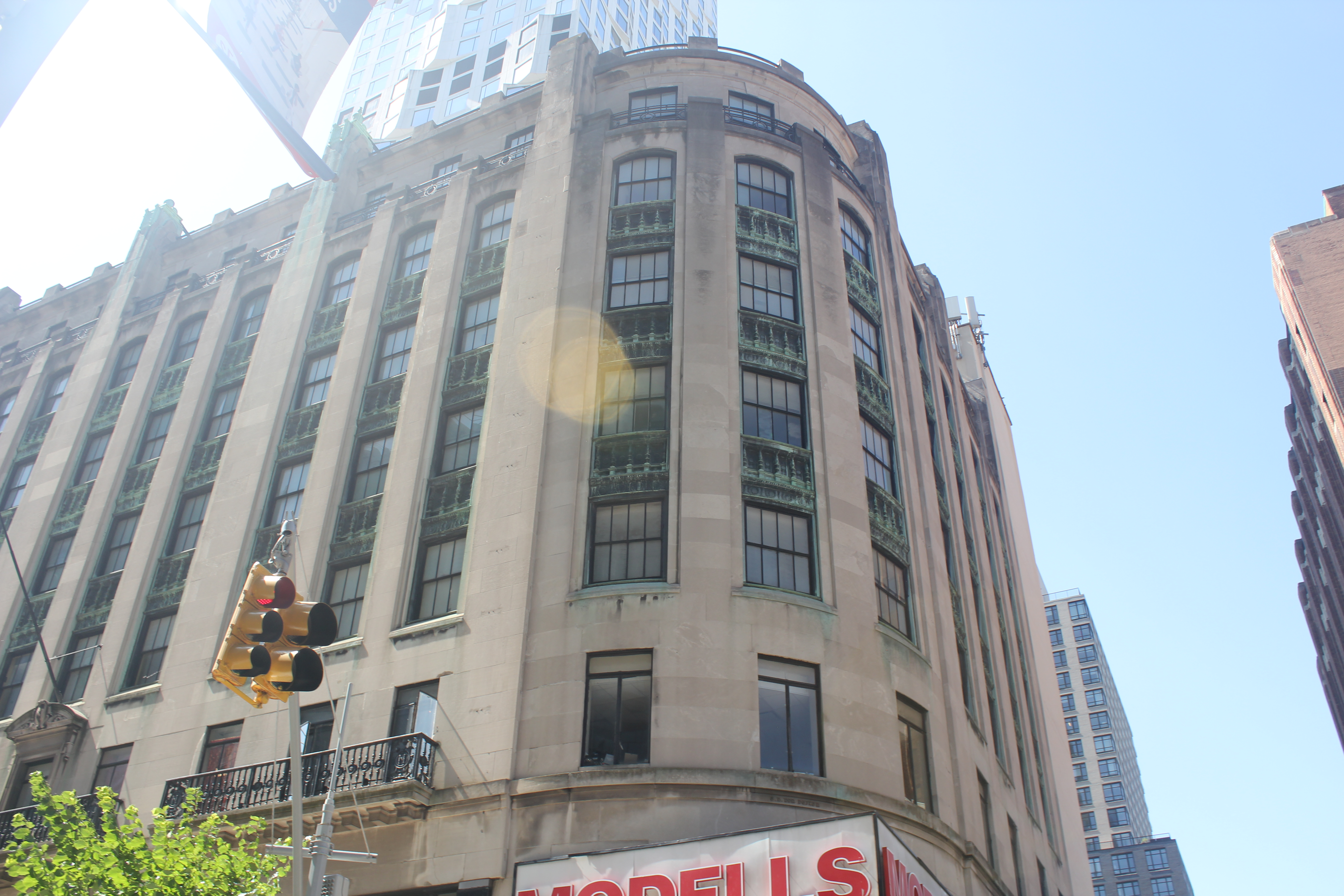
The A. I. Namm Department Store building, seen from the intersection of Fulton and Hoyt Street

Namm leased the site at the corner of Fulton Street and Hoyt Street from theatrical managers Hyde and Behman in November 1890, paying $10,000 per year. Namm announced his intention to spend $60,000 erecting a store on the site, with entrances on both streets. After relocating to Fulton and Hoyt Street, Namm gradually acquired buildings and added new selling departments to his store. Namm bought a land lot on Hoyt Street, with a narrow wing leading to Fulton Street, from Hyde and Behman for $200,000 in 1893. The ground floor was originally operated by S. R. Jonap & Co. as a "dry-goods emporium". The building was damaged by flooding after a water tank on the roof burst in 1896. At the end of 1898, Namm bought the adjacent Zipp's Casino and began renovating the structure. The old Zipp's Casino extended 156 ft (48 m) east to Elm Place, giving the Namm store a third entrance from that street. The store's Elm Place annex had been completed by April 1900.

During the 1900s, Adolph Namm continued to buy additional nearby properties and expand his store. Namm's expanded to a three-story building on Hoyt Street in September 1902. New York City officials approved plans for a six-story wing on Hoyt Street, south of the existing structure, in 1906. Workers began rebuilding a structure at 454 Fulton Street and erecting the six-story Hoyt Street wing, which opened in November 1907. Namm's added various departments to the fourth and fifth floors in early 1908, including a home-furnishings department and a shade-and-screen department. The company also expanded other departments throughout the building and added an entrance with two arches along Fulton Street. The 1907–1908 expansions doubled Namm's floor area and gave the building entrances from all sides of the city block. The store had 75 departments by its 33rd anniversary in 1909. Even with the completion of the Hoyt Street annex, Namm's quickly outgrew its existing structures.

Namm's proposed erecting an eight-story wing on Hoyt and Livingston streets in May 1912, partly on the site of a theater known as the Grand Opera House. Construction of the Hoyt and Livingston annex began the same year, with contractors completing the iron frame in five weeks. The Hoyt and Livingston annex officially opened in January 1913, providing additional space for the store's selling departments and offices. The Interborough Rapid Transit Company agreed to allow Namm's to build a subway entrance from the store's basement to the Hoyt Street station in September 1914. The subway entrance opened two months later, along with a sewing machine department. Spurred by growing patronage, Namm's installed escalators between the first and second floors during late 1915. During World War I, the store's windows contained various exhibits and posters related to the war effort, and Namm's operated a recruiting office on the fourth floor. To reduce congestion caused by delivery trucks, Namm's relocated its delivery depot out of the building in 1918. The next year, a department for novelty furniture opened at the store.

=== 1920s expansions ===
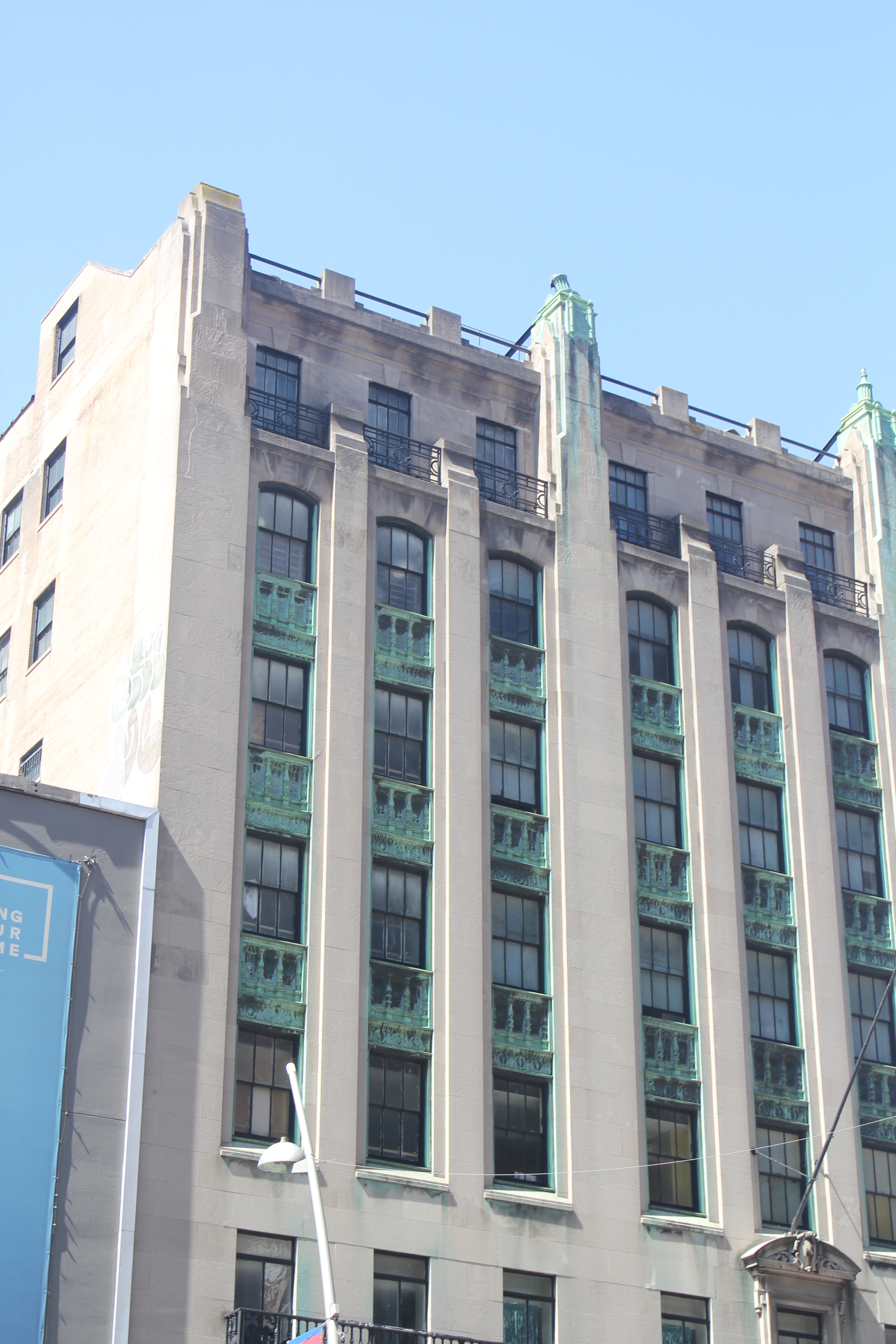
The facade on Fulton Street as seen from the northeast

A. I. Namm & Sons had decided to expand its store by 1920. The company opened a "bargain basement" that April, and it hosted a groundbreaking ceremony for an annex at the corner of Elm Place and Livingston Street two months later. This annex occupied part of the site of the Grand Opera House, which in turn replaced the Elm Place Congregational Church; artifacts from the old church were incorporated into the annex's cornerstone. By then, the building occupied nearly the entire city block between Fulton, Hoyt, and Livingston streets and Elm Place, and it employed between 1,200 and 2,100 people at different times of the year. The first story of the Livingston annex opened in November 1920, and the entire annex opened in February 1921 at a total cost of $1.5 million. The new wing provided space for an art shop, apparel department, and furniture and bedding departments. Following the expansion, the store had 500,000 square feet (46,000 m^{2}), along with 17 elevators, five stairs, and a direct subway entrance. The company built an additional entrance on Livingston Street and added several display windows during 1922 and 1923.

Namm's acquired three buildings on Fulton Street in June 1923 and issued $3.5 million of bonds the same month to fund an expansion of the store. By then, Namm's was the third-largest cash-only department store in the U.S. Namm's formally announced in January 1924 that it would be erecting a nine-story annex along Fulton Street, more than doubling the store's Fulton Street frontage, to designs by Kohn & Butler. This required demolishing Namm's original store at 452 Fulton Street and the adjoining Huyler and Liggett stores. The plans involved building a nine-story building on Fulton Street, measuring 90 feet (27 m) wide, as well as a 15-story tower with setbacks behind it. Work on the nine-story section was to begin first, in May 1924, and last five months. A new clothing department opened at Namm's in September 1924, and the Fulton Street annex had topped out by the next month. Namm's annex formally opened on February 4, 1925. The company never built the 15-story tower on Livingston Street, citing the fact that the new annex was large enough for the store's operations. Namm's instead placed the tower's 100-by-141-foot (30 by 43 m) site for sale.

Namm's opened a radio department in September 1925, and the company began renovating two floors of the new Fulton Street annex for its buying department that November. The company leased space in the adjoining 468 Fulton Street, opening a "sample room" there in early 1926. After completing its first annex on Fulton Street, Namm's bought additional lots on Fulton and Hoyt streets. In June 1928, Namm's announced that they would construct yet another annex at Fulton and Hoyt streets, also designed by Kohn & Butler, as well as reconstruct an existing structure on Livingston and Hoyt streets. The Sorosis Shoe Company's building, which occupied the site, could not be demolished until its lease expired at the beginning of February 1929. The annex at Fulton and Hoyt streets, measuring 22.5 feet (6.9 m) on Fulton Street and 71 feet (22 m) on Hoyt Street, opened in September 1929, in time for Namm's 53rd anniversary. The annex was finished by that November, giving the store 500,000 square feet (46,000 m^{2}) of floor area. The site of the expanded building spanned 67,650 square feet (6,285 m^{2}), nearly the entirety of the 78,600-square-foot (7,300 m^{2}) block.

=== 1930s to 1950s ===
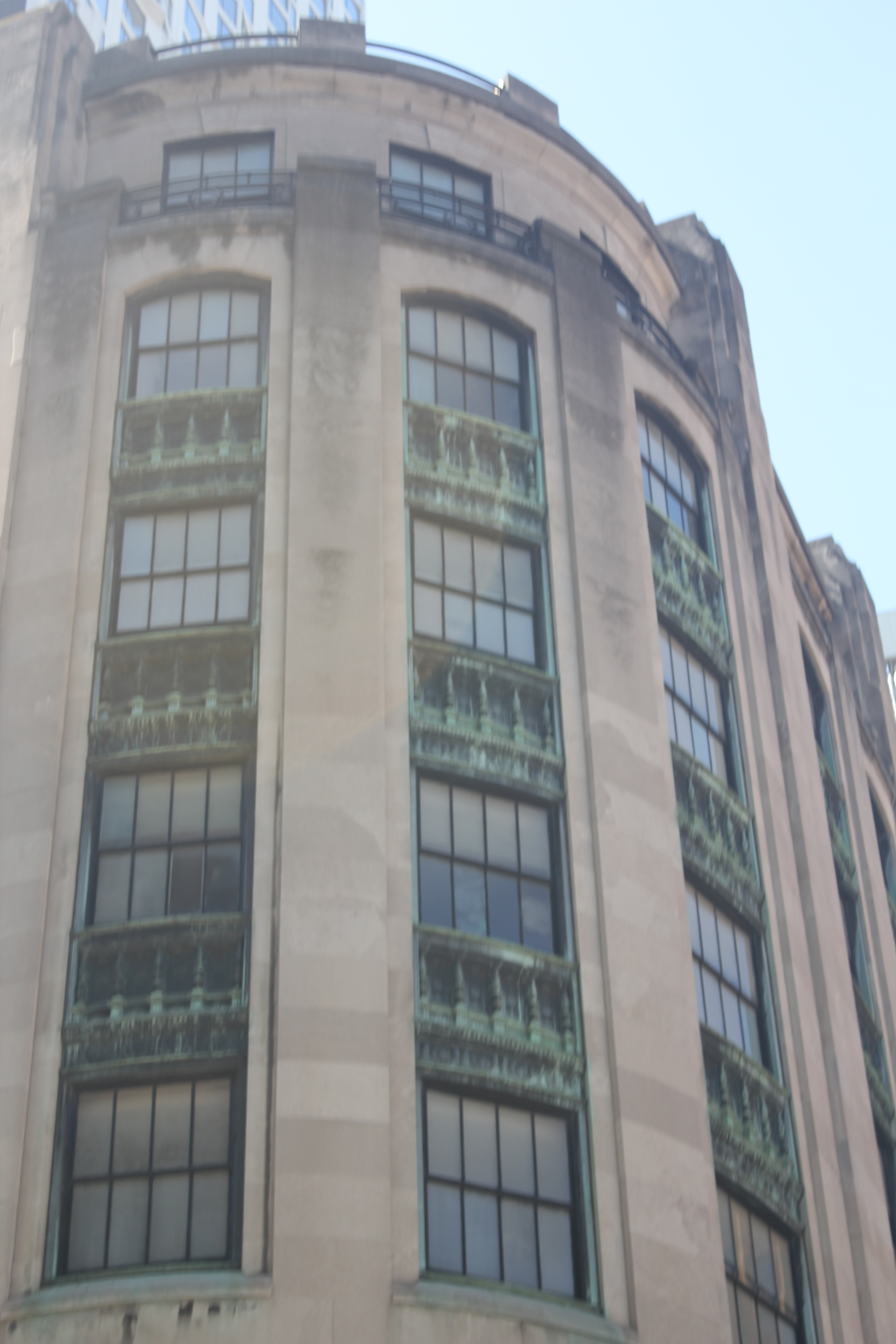
Detail of the curved corner

By 1930, the A. I. Namm & Son Department Store employed 2,000 people in 200 departments. That September, Namm's opened a third entrance to its store from Hoyt Street, as well as a gift shop and a glasses store on Livingston Street. Namm's opened a broadcasting studio for radio station WMCA at the building in November 1931, and it leased an adjacent store on Fulton Street the next year, opening a self-service department there. Four elevators were also added to the Hoyt Street portion of the building in 1933. Mayor Fiorello La Guardia dedicated five diesel generators in the building's basement in 1936; the generators powered an air-conditioning system in the basement, first floor, and second floor.

Namm's renovated its handbag department and added a "hat bar" on the building's ground floor in 1943. The company remodeled the store's Fulton Street entrance in 1945, replacing a show window with a direct entrance from the street. The store remained successful in the mid-1940s, with 125 selling departments spread across the basement and the first five stories. During this time, Namm's hired Morris Lapidus to renovate the store. After Lapidus remodeled the building's ground floor in 1946, Namm's added five additional selling departments to that floor.

Namm's began renovating the second floor in January 1950 at a cost of $125,000, and a new fashion department opened on the second floor at the beginning of that September. The project was designed by Peter Copeland Associates. Namm's remained the third-largest department store in Brooklyn during the early 1950s. After Namm's acquired Frederick Loeser & Co. in 1952, the company decided to continue operating the Namm's store at 452 Fulton Street while closing the Loeser's store at 484 Fulton Street. Following the merger, Namm-Loeser's opened several additional stores on Long Island while maintaining the 452 Fulton Street location as its flagship. A sportswear department opened within the ground floor of the Brooklyn store in early 1955. The Namm family's Arebec Corporation, which owned a 69 percent stake in the Namm-Loeser's chain, acquired 452 Fulton Street in February 1956. Arebec leased the building back to the company.

=== Post-Namm's use ===
==== Closure and partial demolition ====
Namm-Loeser's announced in February 1957 that it would close its Brooklyn store to concentrate on its eastern Long Island operations. The closure was attributed to Namm-Loeser's inability to compete with nearby discount stores, the rise of shopping malls in the suburbs, and the store's growing reliance on "hard goods". Despite opposition from several Namm-Loeser's shareholders, the chain's board of directors voted overwhelmingly to close the store and cancel Namm-Loeser's lease of the building. The company held a liquidation sale that attracted thousands of patrons, and the store officially closed on March 2, 1957. Afterward, there were widespread rumors that another department store chain would acquire the building and raze or reopen it.

Department store Abraham & Straus (A&S), a subsidiary of Federated Department Stores, bought 452 Fulton Street in July 1957 for $2.85 million. The sale had been intended to show A&S's "confidence in the continuous growth of downtown Brooklyn as a shopping area". A&S began demolishing the structures on Livingston Street but did not reveal its plans for the site for several months. In May 1958, A&S announced plans to build a one-story store and 600-car garage on Livingston Street, connected to the A&S store to the west. The New York City Board of Estimate approved the planned store and garage in July 1958. The remaining portion of the Namm building on Fulton and Hoyt streets was to be renovated with stores at ground level and offices above. Four companies had already leased the ground-level stores, Liberty Mutual had leased four of the upper stories, and A&S planned to move its accounting offices to the A. I. Namm & Son Department Store building's top three stories. The garage opened in August 1959, at which point A&S had begun moving its offices into the remaining portion of the Namm building.

==== Reuse of remaining buildings ====
The retail space underneath the adjacent parking garage operated as an annex of A&S until 1980. Crown Acquisitions, operated by developer Stanley Chera, acquired 458 Fulton Street and a small portion of the adjacent parking garage from Federated Department Stores in January 1985.

The Municipal Art Society's Preservation Committee, along with local civic group Brooklyn Heights Association, began petitioning the New York City Landmarks Preservation Commission (LPC) to designate over two dozen buildings in Downtown Brooklyn as landmarks in 2003. Among these structures was the A. I. Namm & Son Department Store, which was designated as a New York City landmark in March 2005. A Modell's Sporting Goods store opened within the building in 2008, and Adidas leased space for a clothing store at 454 Fulton Street in mid-2015.

By 2014, Macy's was planning to redevelop the adjacent parking garage at 11 Hoyt Street. After Brookfield Properties proposed developing a skyscraper on that site, Macy's stipulated that a department store be built at the base of the skyscraper, extending into 458 Fulton Street. In 2021, the New York City Department of Homeless Services announced that it would open a 160-bed homeless shelter for single men within the Namm building. Public hearings for the proposed shelter were hosted that October.

== Architecture ==
=== Current structure ===
The present building at 450–458 Fulton Street is the only remnant of the original A. I. Namm & Son Department Store building, which occupied much of the Fulton Street blockfront between Hoyt Street and Elm Place. It was built during 1924–1925 and 1928–1929 as a pair of annexes to the original building. Robert D. Kohn and Charles Butler were the architects of both annexes on Fulton Street. The Thompson–Starrett Company was hired to build the first annex; although the contractor for the second annex is unknown, the Thompson–Starrett Company may have been rehired for the second annex. When Namm's Fulton Street annexes were completed, few contemporary architectural publications wrote about the structures. Nonetheless, Kohn and Butler received an award from Turin's Exposition of Fine Arts in 1926 for their design of the first Fulton Street annex.

==== Facade ====
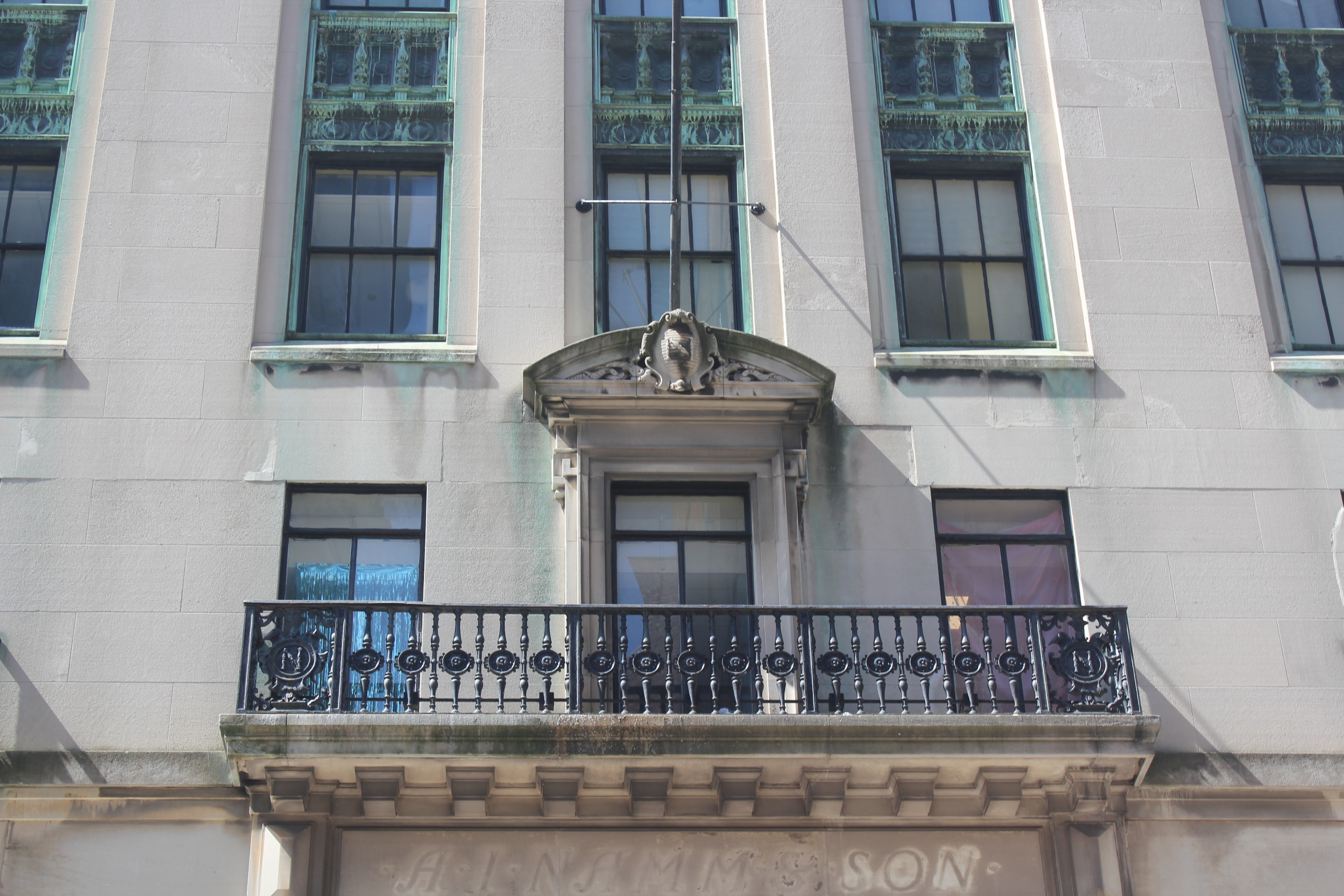
Balcony on Fulton Street

The 1925 and 1929 annexes on Fulton Street are eight stories high. The facade is divided horizontally into several sections: a two-story base, a transitional story, a four-story midsection, and an attic story. As built, the first two stories were clad in bronze and stone, while the upper stories were clad in limestone. The Fulton Street facade to the north is divided vertically into three groups of three bays; each group of bays is separated by a sculptured pier that rises above the roofline. The tops of the piers on Fulton Street originally contained the letter "N" (signifying the building's original tenant, A. I. Namm Department Store), which in turn is flanked by torches and topped by bronze finials. The annexes' northwestern corner on Hoyt and Fulton streets is rounded. The Hoyt Street facade to the west is similarly divided into two groups of two bays. The eastern facade is partially visible and is clad mostly in brick, except the section nearest Fulton Street, which is clad in limestone.

In the center three bays of the Fulton Street facade, there was originally a wide ground-level entrance with two Corinthian columns, which in turn was flanked by large storefront windows. The rest of the ground story contained storefront windows with bronze spandrel panels above them, and there was a three-sided storefront window at the corner of Fulton and Hoyt Street. The second story contained multi-paned windows topped by transoms. In addition, there were awnings above the windows, as well as sconces attached to the piers. Over the years, the first two stories were altered significantly with the addition of glass-and-metal storefronts and rolldown gates. A limestone band course runs across the facade above the second story, and traces of the letters "A. I. Namm & Son" are visible on the band course along Fulton Street.

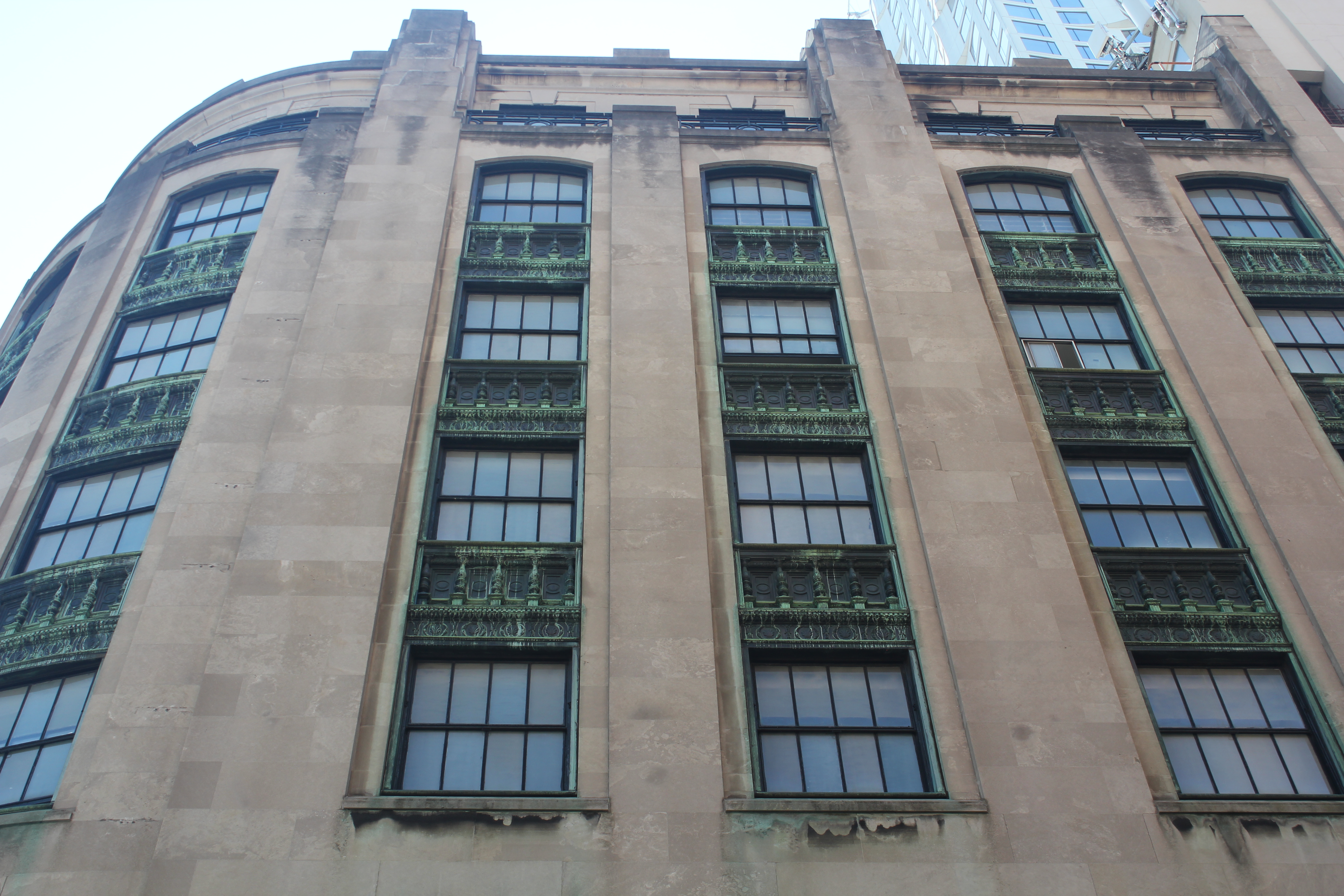
The upper part of the facade seen from Hoyt Street

On the third story, there are three balconies with modillions and metal railings; each of the balconies corresponds to a group of three windows. In the center grouping, the center window contains a pediment with a cartouche and flagpole. On the fourth through seventh stories, each bay contains multi-paneled sash windows on each floor; the windows on the seventh story are placed within segmental arches. (Note: The windows in the 1925 annex are arranged in a three-over-three layout, while the windows in the 1929 annex are arranged in a four-over-four layout.) Each bay is separated vertically by pilasters, and the windows on different floors are separated horizontally by bronze spandrel panels that depict balusters. The eighth story is set back from the rest of the facade and contains metal railings, which run between the tops of each pier. The eighth-story facade consists of rectangular sash windows topped by keystones. Above the eighth story is a parapet with crenellations that are linked by a metal-tube railing, as well as a bulkhead on the Hoyt Street side of the building.

==== Interior ====
The basement and first through fifth stories of the 1925 annex on Fulton Street were used as sales floors. A bank of escalators rose from the ground story to the second and third stories. The entirety of the ground floor was clad with marble, and the ground floor's heating system could prevent cold drafts from coming in. At the ground story, a staircase within the main entrance vestibule, as well as a marble staircase in the middle of the store, originally led to the basement, where there was an exit to the Hoyt Street subway station. This exit was decorated with a red-marble floor. Because the subway entrance was the same height as the basement floor, the basement had a ceiling height of 16 feet (4.9 m). Above the sales floors, the sixth story contained inventory rooms. The accounting and financial control departments occupied the seventh floor, while the executive offices were on the eighth floor. The ninth floor contained employee recreation facilities and additional departmental offices.

The 1929 annex, on Fulton and Hoyt streets, slightly expanded the selling area of the 1925 annex. The Fulton and Hoyt streets annex added 28,000 square feet (2,600 m^{2}) to the store, including 15,000 square feet (1,400 m^{2}) of space for sales floors. The first six stories contained the sales floors, while the top two stories contained the store's offices. The ground floor of the 1929 annex also contained a direct subway entrance from the street.

=== Former structures ===
The A. I. Namm & Son Building occupied much of the city block at its peak in the 1930s. The original building from 1890 was a utilitarian structure with few decorations. It occupied a 91-by-117-foot (28 by 36 m) site on Hoyt Street, with a narrow 25-by-70-foot (7.6 by 21.3 m) wing extending north to Fulton Street. Because the Fulton Street wing was only 25 feet wide, the storefront windows were placed perpendicularly to the street, creating an entrance vestibule that extended 35 feet (11 m) deep into the store. After the Elm Street site was acquired in 1898, local architecture firm Parfitt Bros. designed a six-story structure on Elm Street, measuring 50 feet (15 m) wide and 156 feet (48 m) deep. Another six-story addition on Hoyt Street, measuring 60 by 125 feet (18 by 38 m), was constructed between 1906 and 1907 to designs by local architect B. E. Lowe.

At the southwest corner of the building, on Hoyt and Livingston streets, was an eight-story wing measuring 100 feet (30 m) wide and 80 feet (24 m) deep, dating from the early 1910s. The first five stories of this annex were used as sales floors, the sixth and seventh floors were for receiving and marking incoming merchandise, and the top story was for business and executive offices. By the mid-1910s, the store building covered 300,000 square feet (28,000 m^{2}) and had its own post office; 20 private telephone booths; an employees' clinic, a roof garden, reading room, and library; two escalators; 12 elevators; and entrances from the subway and from all four sides of the block. Yet another six-story annex, completed in 1921, extended southeast to the corner of Livingston Street and Elm Place. All these structures were demolished in 1957 after A&S took over the site.

== See also ==
- Art Deco architecture of New York City
- List of New York City Designated Landmarks in Brooklyn
