= 11 Hoyt =

Skyscraper in Brooklyn, New York

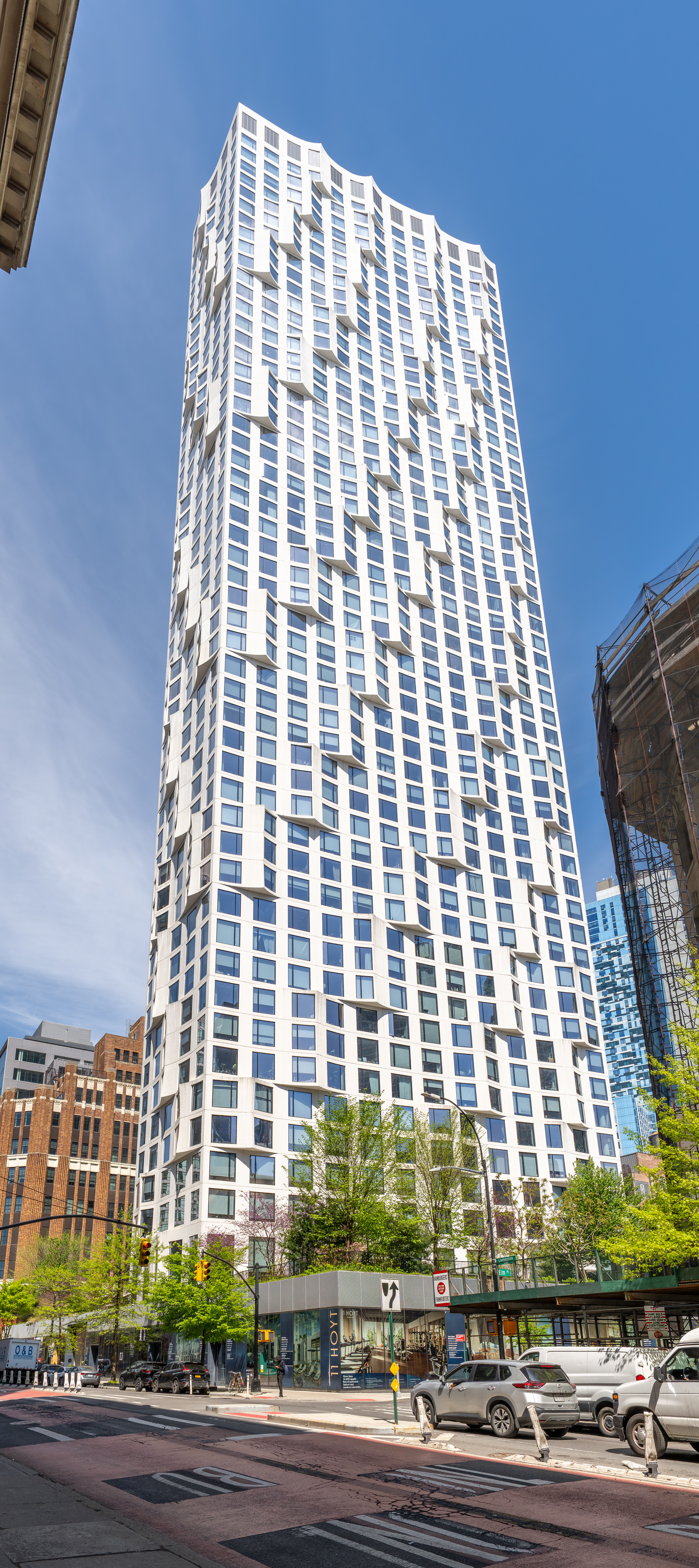
- Interactive map of the 11 Hoyt area

General information
- Status: Completed
- Type: Residential
- Location: 11 Hoyt Street, Brooklyn, New York, United States
- Coordinates: 40.6897°N 73.9850°W
- Construction started: 2015
- Completed: 2021
- Cost: $685 million

Height
- Height: 618 feet (188 m)

Design and construction
- Architect: Studio Gang
- Developer: Tishman Speyer

Website
- 11hoytbrooklyn.com

11 Hoyt is a residential skyscraper in the Downtown Brooklyn neighborhood of Brooklyn in New York City. It was designed by architect Studio Gang with executive architect Hill West and developed by real estate conglomerate Tishman Speyer.

== History ==
In August 2015, Tishman Speyer purchased the site, which was next to the A. I. Namm & Son Department Store. Three lenders—JPMorgan Chase, Starwood Property Trust, and iStar—provided $380 million in financing for the deal. The building's facade was constructed in Canada. The building topped out in June 2019, and was completed in 2021. The building is Tishman Speyer's first residential building in New York City.

Sales for condominiums in the building launched in September 2018.

The building is part of the larger Tishman-led project to redevelop the former Macy's branch in Brooklyn.

== Design ==
The building's exterior somewhat resembles that of 8 Spruce Street, designed by architect Frank Gehry. Jeanne Gang has said the building's facade was inspired by townhouses in Brooklyn, many of which include bay windows. The interiors were designed by Michaelis Boyd, and the units have two possible color palettes.

== Usage ==
The building is residential, with 480 condominium residences. It also includes 40,000 square feet (3,700 m^{2}) of retail space. The day care Petits Poussins signed a lease for space in the building in June 2021.

== See also ==
- List of tallest buildings in Brooklyn
