= Jeffrey Feil =

- Born: 1947 (age 78–79)
- Education: University of Cincinnati (BS); Brooklyn Law School (JD)
- Occupation: real estate developer
- Known for: president and CEO of The Feil Organization
- Spouse: Lee Feil
- Parent(s): Gertrude Cohen Feil; Louis Feil
- Family: Marilyn Feil Barry (sister); Judith Feil Jaffe (sister); Carole Feil (sister)

Jeffrey Feil is a New York-based real estate developer and president and CEO of The Feil Organization.

== Early life and education ==
Feil was born to a Jewish family, the only son of Gertrude (née Cohen) and Louis Feil. His father first worked in the fur business before investing into real estate in the 1950s. He took a conservative approach using minimal debt and re-invested his profits which enabled him to grow his portfolio steadily and to survive the inevitable downturns. His father's motto was "take care of your buildings and your buildings will take care of you." Feil was raised in Rockville Centre, New York. He has three sisters: Marilyn Barry (born 1938), Judith Jaffe (born 1940), and Carole Feil (born 1944). Feil graduated with a B.S. from the University of Cincinnati and a J.D. from Brooklyn Law School.

== Career ==
In 1978, he joined The Feil Organization and after his father retired in 1988, he was running the organization. His brother-in-law Stanley Barry, helped to manage the New York portfolio; his nephews, Justin and Eric Derfner, also worked for the Feil Organization. In 1999, his father died with an estate estimated at $250 million. In 2002, Feil was a founding partner of RCG Longview, a real estate financing company, separate from the Feil Organization. RCG Longview and the Feil Organization, would often partner together to complete transactions.

In 2004, he was an investor in a group that purchased the 110-story Sears Tower in Chicago for $840 million with partners Joseph Moinian, Joseph Chetrit, and Lloyd Goldman, eventually changing the name to the Willis Tower in 2009. After the real estate crash of 2008–2009, and backed by the real estate held by the Feil Organization, he made several large and lucrative purchases. In 2009, he partnered with Lloyd Goldman and Stanley Chera to purchase for $117 million the retail space in The St. Regis Hotel; in 2012, they sold it for $380 million. Also in 2009, he partnered with George Comfort & Sons to purchase One Worldwide Plaza for $590 million after developer Harry Macklowe turned the property over to his lenders after the real estate crash (Macklowe had paid $1.74 billion for it in 2008); in 2013, they sold 49% of the building to RXR Realty, LLC for $600 million. In 2010, he co-developed Bakery Square in Pittsburgh.

As of 2013, the Feil Organization owns or manages over $7 billion in real estate spread over nine states including the Fred F. French Building and the General Electric Building.

== Philanthropy ==
In 2011, Feil donated $3 million to the South Nassau Communities Hospital in Oceanside, New York to build a cancer center. The center was renamed The Gertrude & Louis Feil Cancer Center at South Nassau Communities Hospital. Feil serves as a trustee for the Joan & Sanford I. Weill Medical College and Graduate School of Medicine; Yeshiva University, and Brooklyn Law School. He also serves on the Board of Governors of the Real Estate Board of New York and is president of the Feil Family Foundation. In 2013, Feil donated $28 million to establish the Feil Family Brain and Mind Research Institute at Weill Cornell Medical College. Also in 2013, Feil and his wife Lee donated $5 million to the Peconic Bay Medical Center to open an ambulatory care campus in Manorville, New York. It will be named The Gertrude and Louis Feil Campus for Ambulatory Care.

== Personal life ==
Feil lives with his wife Eileen "Lee" Feil in Remsenburg, New York. After his mother's death in 2006, his three sisters accused him of withholding distributions from their father's estate. The matters within the family ended in 2017 when a settlement was reached within the family.
