= The Feil Organization =

Real estate company

- Type: family-owned real estate investment, development, and management company
- Location: New York City, New York, United States
- CEO, Chairman of the Board: Jeffrey J. Feil
- Website: www.feilorg.com
- Remarks: Portfolio of $7 billion (2013)

The Feil Organization is a family-owned real estate investment, development, and management company in New York City governed by a nine-member board, with a portfolio of $7 billion as of 2013.

The Feil Organization is one of New York City's oldest family-owned real estate companies. Its CEO and chairman is Jeffrey J. Feil. Other board members include Jay Anderson, Marty Edelman, David Schizer, Richard Barry, Eric Derfner, Jonathan Estreich, Brian Feil and Adam Jaffe.

The company owns, develops, and manages retail, commercial, industrial, residential, and undeveloped properties. It owns and operates over 26 million square feet of office space. Its New York City properties include the Fred F. French Building at 551 Fifth Avenue at East 45th Street; 4 Park Avenue at East 34th Street; the Rodin Studios at 200 West 57th Street and Seventh Avenue; and 570 Lexington Avenue at East 51st Street.
