= 4 Park Avenue =

Building in Manhattan, New York

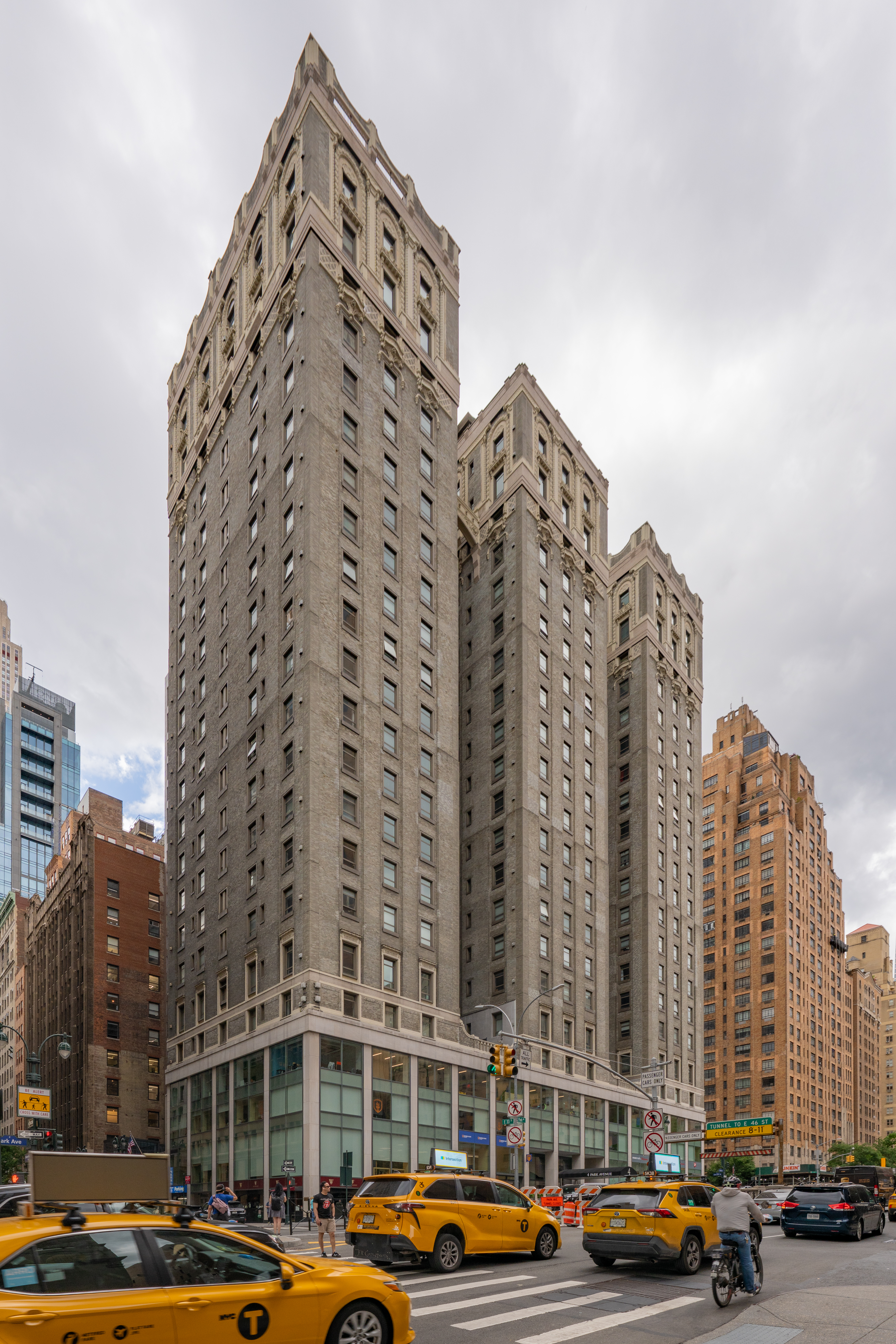
- Seen from the east
- Interactive map of the 4 Park Avenue area
- Alternative names: Vanderbilt Hotel

General information
- Architectural style: neoclassical
- Location: Manhattan, New York
- Coordinates: 40°44′49″N 73°58′55″W
- Construction started: 1910
- Completed: March 1913
- Opening: January 10, 1912

Height
- Roof: 225 ft (69 m)

Technical details
- Structural system: Steel superstructure, concrete floor arches
- Floor count: 22
- Lifts/elevators: 10

Design and construction
- Architect: Warren and Wetmore
- Developer: Alfred Gwynne Vanderbilt

Renovating team
- Architect: Schuman, Lichtenstein & Claman

New York City Landmark
- Designated: April 5, 1994
- Reference no.: 1904
- Designated entity: Interior: Della Robbia Bar (Crypt)

4 Park Avenue (formerly known as the Vanderbilt Hotel) is a 22-story building in the Murray Hill neighborhood of Manhattan in New York City. Designed by Warren and Wetmore, the structure was built for Alfred Gwynne Vanderbilt and opened in 1912 as a hotel. It is along the west side of Park Avenue between 33rd and 34th Streets. Following a renovation by Schuman, Lichtenstein & Claman between 1965 and 1967, the top 18 stories have been used as residential apartments. The lowest three stories above ground, as well as three basement levels, are used as commercial space and carry an alternate address of 6 Park Avenue. As of 2021, the building is owned by The Feil Organization.

4 Park Avenue's facade was originally made of gray brick and white architectural terracotta. The facade of the lowest four stories dates from the 1960s renovation and is made of glass and steel. Above that, the building retains its original facade and has two light courts facing Park Avenue. The building has a steel superstructure and had mechanical equipment in its basements. The hotel's lobby was designed in the Adam style and is partially preserved as the modern residential lobby. The first basement had a grill room known as the Della Robbia Room, decorated ornately with Guastavino tile; part of the room survives and is designated as a New York City interior landmark. The upper stories had close to 600 rooms, and the top two stories originally contained a private penthouse apartment for A. G. Vanderbilt and his family.

After several years of planning and construction, the Vanderbilt Hotel opened on January 10, 1912, as one of the first large commercial developments in Murray Hill. The Vanderbilt soon became a popular meeting place for companies in the textile and women's apparel industries. A syndicate bought the hotel in 1925, and the New York Life Insurance Company foreclosed on the hotel in 1935. Manger Hotels acquired the hotel in 1941 and continued to operate it until the hotel closed in 1965. A group led by John Marqusee bought the building in 1966 and spent the next year converting the hotel into residences and offices. The building has undergone minor renovations over the years.

== Site ==
4 Park Avenue (formerly the Vanderbilt Hotel) is in the Murray Hill neighborhood of Manhattan in New York City, bounded by 33rd Street on the south, Park Avenue on the east, and 34th Street on the north. The building's land lot has a total area of 15,800 ft^{2} (1,470 m^{2}). It measures 197.5 ft (60.2 m) from north to south and 80 ft (24 m) from west to east. An entrance to the New York City Subway's 33rd Street station is directly outside the building's southeast corner. The building is on the same block as the Madison Belmont Building to the west. Other nearby buildings include 2 Park Avenue to the south, 3 Park Avenue to the east, B. Altman and Company Building to the northwest, and 29 East 32nd Street to the southwest.

The adjacent portion of Park Avenue slopes upward from south to north. The site was part of the 18th-century estate of merchant Robert Murray. In the 1860s, after the Park Avenue Tunnel was built, the segment of Fourth Avenue between 34th and 40th Streets was renamed Park Avenue, while the avenue's name south of 34th Street remained unchanged. Since the house numbering system reset at the southern end of Park Avenue, the Vanderbilt Hotel and other buildings between 32nd and 34th Streets originally had Fourth Avenue addresses. The segment from 32nd to 34th Streets, outside the current building, was renamed Park Avenue in 1924, at which time the building gained a Park Avenue address. Even before the renumbering, the Vanderbilt Hotel had marketed itself as being at "East 34th Street and Park Avenue" despite technically being on Fourth Avenue.

Fourth and Park Avenues in Murray Hill had been developed with upscale residences by the 1870s. The residences included those of the Vanderbilt family, who built Grand Central Depot (later Grand Central Terminal) for the New York and Harlem Railroad several blocks north in 1871. The Vanderbilt family moved uptown in 1880 but retained ownership of the site. Just before present-day 4 Park Avenue was developed, the land had been occupied by six buildings.

== Architecture ==
4 Park Avenue was designed by Warren and Wetmore in the neoclassical style and developed by Alfred Gwynne Vanderbilt in 1912. Numerous other contractors were involved in the construction process. As built, it was 22 stories high and contained three full basements, as well as a partial fourth basement level. Emporis cites the building as being 20 stories and 225 ft (69 m) high. The building's modern appearance dates to a renovation by Schuman, Lichtenstein & Claman between 1965 and 1967.

=== Form and facade ===
==== Lowest stories ====
When the building was constructed, it was decorated with gray brick and white architectural terracotta. The terracotta at the base was designed by the Hartford Faience Company. The ornament consisted of cream-colored low reliefs, while the walls were made of mottled, semi-glazed brick in blue-grey and plum colors. Originally, the base of the building contained large windows with semicircular lunette windows at their tops. The lunettes were surrounded by Adam style frames that resembled fans. The entrance was at the center of the Park Avenue elevation and contained a canopy. There is a sealed service entrance on 49 East 33rd Street, leading to a tunnel.

In 1967, the lowest three floors were redesigned with a glass and travertine facade. Some of the original ornamentation from the lowest floors, including three medallions measuring 3 ft (0.91 m) and twenty-four pieces of relief, are preserved in a private garden at 433 East 58th Street in Sutton Place, Manhattan. The entrance to the apartments on the upper floors is directly on Park Avenue and carries the address 4 Park Avenue. The offices on the lower floors are accessed from 33rd and 34th Streets and originally carried the address 6 Park Avenue.

==== Upper stories ====
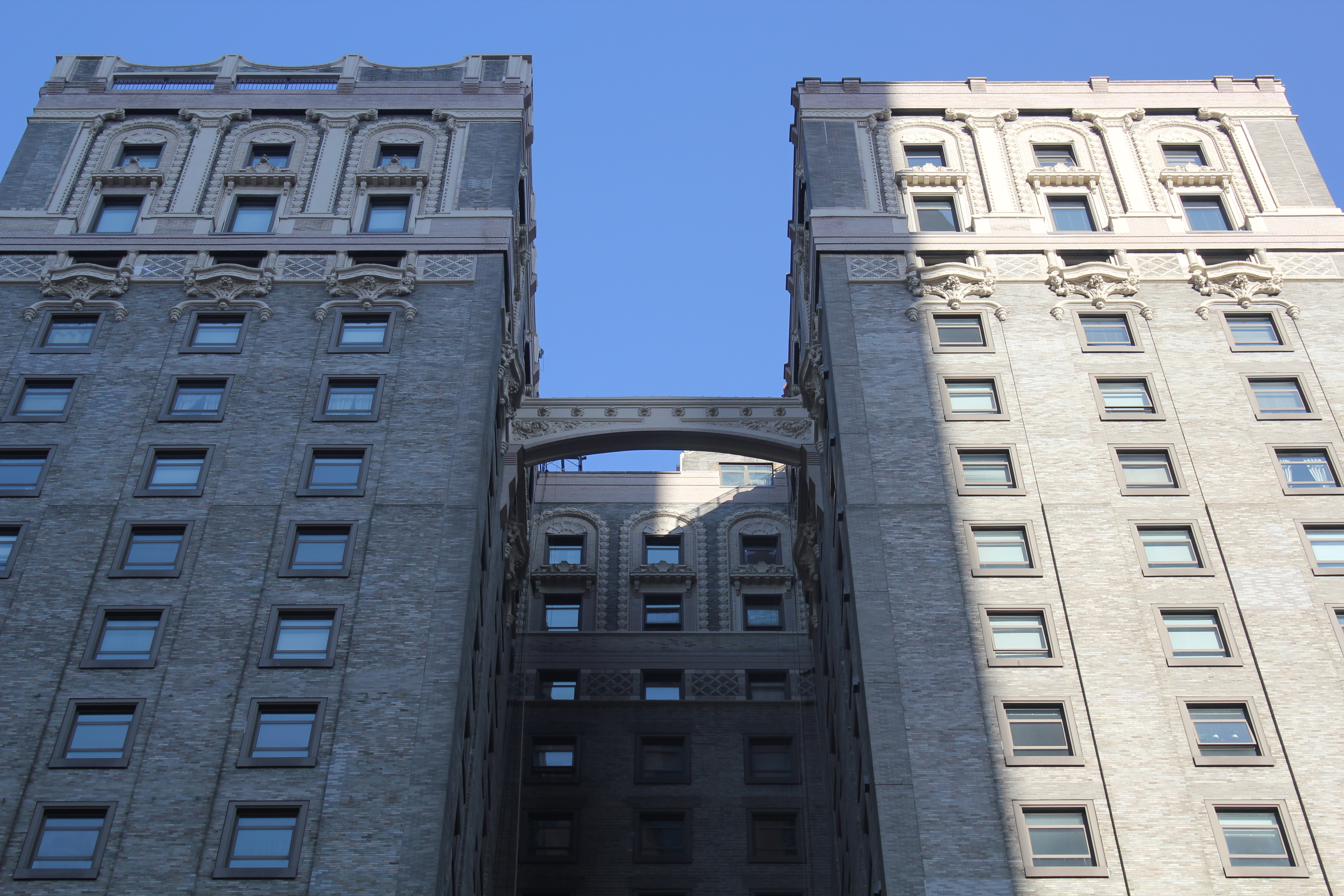
Top of the light court between the southern and center wings

Above the base, the building is designed with two light courts facing Park Avenue. These divided the upper stories into three wings, arranged in an "E" shape. When the building was used as a hotel, this allowed each guest to have an exterior window. Each wing measures three bays wide, while the side elevations measure five bays wide. There is a band course of brick and stone above the 4th story, as well as balustrades in front of the light courts on that story. The 5th-story windows contain ornate terracotta frames, while the 6th- through 18th-story windows have a simpler design. The western frontage was designed as a fireproof barrier without any windows. The light courts, combined with the narrowness of the site, required that the hotel be taller than most others in New York City at the time of its construction (with the exception of the Belmont Hotel). The brick and terracotta facade was preserved when the building was renovated in the 1960s.

On the top three stories, the building was ornately decorated with terracotta motifs such as lozenges, lions' heads, helmets, and colonnettes. At the 19th story, each window has a shallow pediment, which supports a balustrade that protrudes from each of the 20th-story windows. In addition, each of the 20th-story windows is separated by a terracotta panel with a pattern. There are stone trusses across the light courts at this level. On the top two stories, there are double-height round arches made of terracotta. The windows at the 21st story contain pediments above them.

Instead of a protruding cornice, the Vanderbilt Hotel was topped by a curved parapet that contained classical heads and lace decorations, as well as electric lights. The hotel was one of the first buildings in New York City to illuminate its roof at night. The parapet measured 7 ft (2.1 m) tall. The roof was coated with asbestos as a fireproofing measure. The terracotta at the pinnacle was made by New York Architectural Terra Cotta. The roof has 36 sculpted terracotta heads, each measuring 5 ft (1.5 m) high and weighing 500 lb (230 kg). Each sculpture depicts either the grinning classical god Bacchus, who had a beard, or a smiling face of unclear gender, who did not have a beard. Another 18 sculptures, along with the parapet, were removed in 1966 when four penthouse apartments were built on the top floors. Renovation architect Peter Claman, an unnamed art dealer, and the Brooklyn Museum each took some of the busts, which ended up as far away as Fort Lauderdale, Florida.

=== Mechanical and structural features ===
The mechanical equipment was placed in the hotel's subbasements. There were several Babcock & Wilcox boilers, which were fed by automatic stokers. Each stoker was supplied by a traveling hopper with a capacity of about 1,500 lb (680 kg), filled by a coal conveyor with continuously moving buckets. Additionally, there were three direct current electric generators that were capable of generating 500 kW (670 hp) at any one time, as well as a central oiling system and two garbage incinerators. The steam pipes in each room were hidden by marble countertops and asbestos curtains. The hotel had an ice machine, which had a capacity of 80 short tons (71 long tons; 73 t), for the refrigeration and cooling systems. The iced water was then pumped to pantries on seven stories. There was also a machine capable of filtering 14,000 ft^{3}/min (6.6 m^{3}/s), which cleaned the air for the Della Robbia Room in the basement. The original boilers were removed in the 1960s.

There were six elevators in total, each with crimson tapestries and a wooden veneer. The elevators were hydraulically powered, with hydraulic cylinders in the basement. In the 1960s, the elevators were converted to cable-hauled cabs, but the old hydraulic cylinders were left in place.

The Vanderbilt Hotel was erected with a steel superstructure, which was then reinforced with masonry. The outer walls of the building contained masonry walls that tapered in thickness from 2 ft (0.61 m) at the bottom to 8 in (200 mm) at the top. During the 1960s renovation, the thickness of the exterior walls was reduced by up to 4 inches. The masonry was not laid on a perfectly straight axis. In some of the intermediate stories, the masonry was misaligned by as much as 4 in (100 mm), requiring the installation of custom plumbing fixtures for each of the upper-story apartments, rather than mass-produced fixtures. The upper stories contain floor slabs made of concrete arches. The ceilings of the original hotel measured 11 ft (3.4 m) high. During the 1960s, these were lowered by as much to 2 ft (0.61 m) to accommodate utilities in the ceiling. In the service hallways, the floor slabs are of cement and the walls were wainscoted with thin iron plates. The partition walls are made of gypsum.

=== Interior ===
==== Lobby ====
Like the lower part of the facade, the lobby was designed in the Adam style. The lobby was treated as a single, large open space with a vaulted ceiling. This decision was informed by the fact that the Vanderbilt Hotel was actually intended as an apartment hotel for long-term residents. Thus, the building did not contain a large ballroom or other spaces that characterized transient hotels. The restaurant and palm garden were separated from the rest of the lobby by screens and plants. At the 34th Street end, the men's bar and writing room were enclosed with partitions. The women's writing room was housed within a long alcove off the lobby. The space also contained black furniture. Next to the lobby, there was a cashier's office with a bronze screen designed by Louis Comfort Tiffany. This room had a Numidian-marble floor. A children's playroom was added to the lobby in 1913. A "Far East Room" was created in the lobby after World War I in advance of a dinner in which Ferdinand Foch was a guest; it remained in operation through the late 1950s.

The first-floor lobby was clad in imitation Caen stone, which was actually made of plaster. The main lobby had a vaulted ceiling supported by square piers. These piers curved directly onto the ceiling and were clad with sandstone. Crystal chandeliers, each with 24 lamps, were suspended directly from the ceiling. In the lobby was a frieze created by Beatrice Astor Chanler in relief. The frieze was a dull gold color, while the reliefs were designed in the style of Italian ceramic artist Luca della Robbia. The rugs were designed specifically for the hotel. Two such rugs were ordered for the lobby entrance, each measuring 27 by 48 ft (8.2 by 14.6 m). Each rug was decorated with Chinese motifs and was colored a "royal Chinese blue", with central medallions. The piers on the walls contained shelves with blue vases, within which were placed lighting fixtures.

During the 1960s renovation, Intramural Associates redesigned a part of the old hotel lobby, which was preserved as the building's residential entrance. The lobby was redesigned with a color palette of red, white, and blue, and the lobby walls were wainscoted in cherry wood. Barbara Comfort designed a 6 by 9 ft (1.8 by 2.7 m) tapestry for the lobby, which was unveiled in 1967. The tapestry depicts a scene from the American Revolutionary War in which Mary Lindley Murray, an 18th-century resident of the site, distracted British troops during the Landing at Kip's Bay, giving American troops time to escape.

==== Della Robbia Room ====
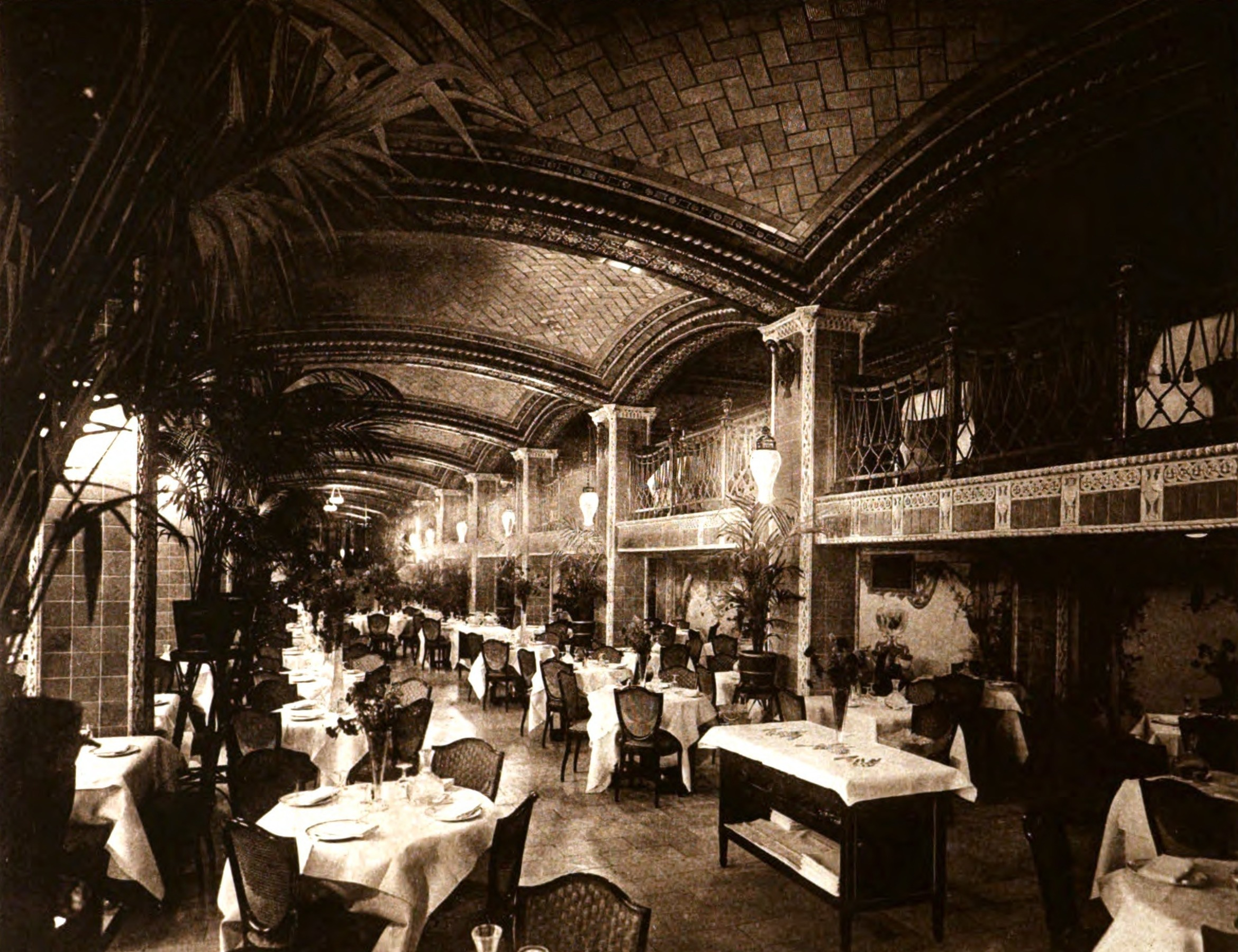
Historical view of the grill room, with the elevated gallery at right

The basement originally contained a double-height grill room with a vaulted ceiling and elevated gallery. It was known as the Della Robbia Room, after Luca Della Robbia, and could fit a thousand guests. The bar at the southern section of the restaurant was originally nicknamed the "Crypt". There was a kitchen below the bar, as well as a laundry room at the north end of the grill room. The spaces were split across multiple levels, each only slightly above the other. A door from Park Avenue led to a central corridor directly above the kitchen, where a staircase led down to the main grill room. The bar was three steps below the corridor to the south, while the gallery was three steps above the corridor to the north. A staircase also led from the grill room to the lobby, and the bar also had its own door from 33rd Street. The restaurant was extensively decorated with ceramic Guastavino tiles manufactured by the Rookwood Pottery Company; these tiles depicted motifs such as flowers and faces.

Most of the grill room was replaced with a parking garage in 1967, but the Crypt and a portion of the grill room remain in their original condition. The remaining section is less than one-fifth the size of the original grill room. The extant portion of the Della Robbia Room is designated as a New York City interior landmark, one of a few restaurants in the city with such a designation, (Note: The Four Seasons Restaurant, Gage and Tollner, Grand Central Oyster Bar & Restaurant, the Oak Room, and the Rainbow Room are also designated as interior landmarks. The Oyster Bar is part of Grand Central Terminal and the Oak Room is part of the Plaza Hotel.) and has contained Wolfgang's Steakhouse since 2004. Along with the Rathskeller at the Seelbach Hotel in Louisville, Kentucky, the Della Robbia Room contains one of the few extant examples of Rookwood tiles in the world. The space is also one of the few interiors in New York City with Guastavino tiles.

Placed along the Della Robbia Room's length were double-height square piers, which divided the room into bays. The room was generally decorated in a cream and blue color scheme. The piers were covered in tiles, decorated with tropical birds, fish, flowers, and foliage "in a slightly humorous vein"; they contained fretwork at their corners and capitals. The gallery was placed behind the piers and had an Adam-style balustrade. This gallery was used by the grill room's workers. At the top of the room was a golden cornice. The two southernmost bays of the gallery remain largely intact and are used as the rear of the modern restaurant space. A wooden platform has been placed above the original floor. These remaining bays are accessed by a staircase that leads from the bar area. The main floor of the restaurant, now the parking garage, has been stripped of most decoration except for some small patches of marble.

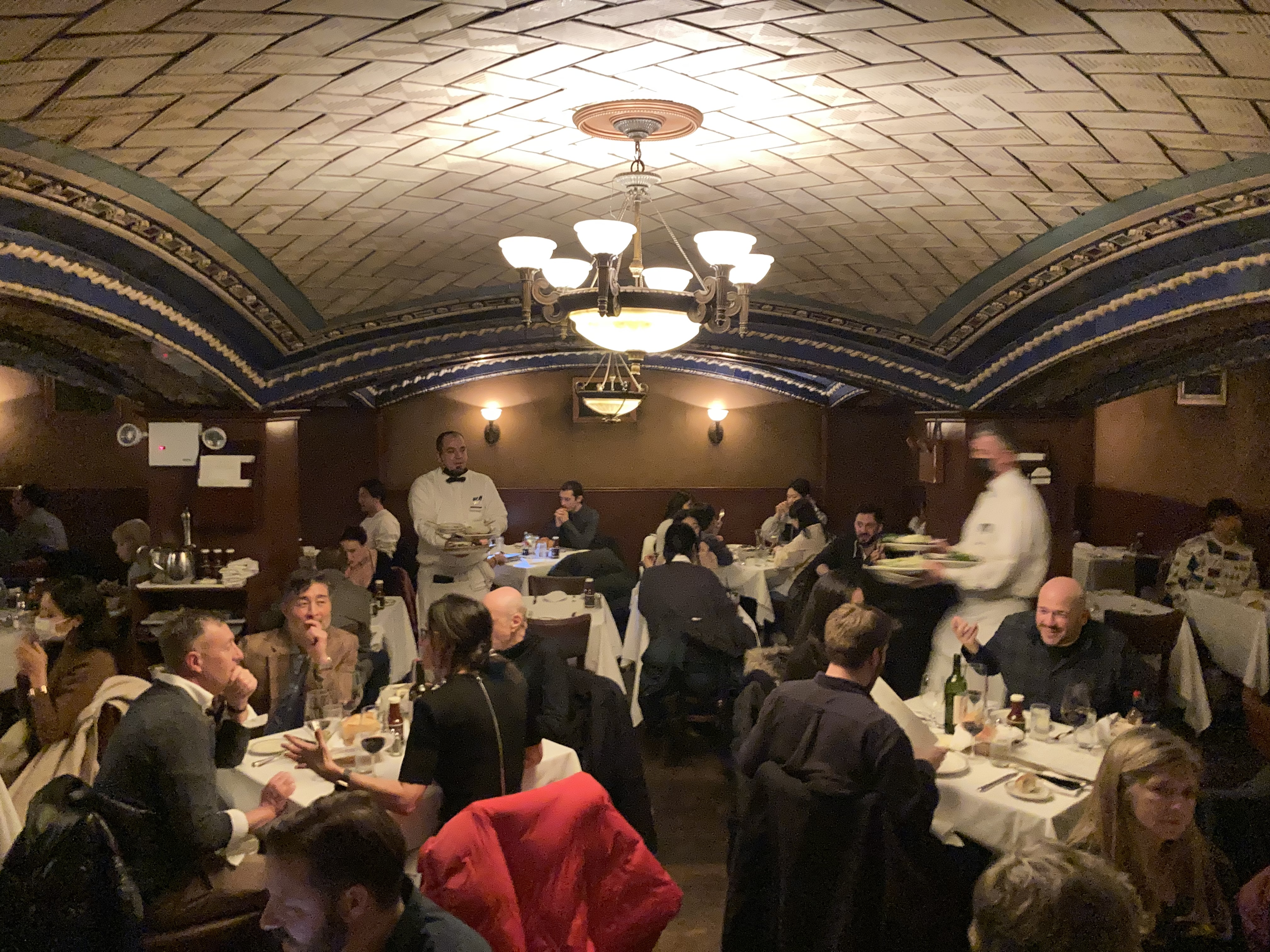
One of the remaining vaults of the former bar room, which has housed Wolfgang's Steakhouse since 2004

The former Crypt, now the main dining room, consists of nine bays in a three-by-three grid. The ceiling is supported by freestanding square piers in the center of the space, with wooden wainscoting. The walls contain engaged pilasters and formerly included lighting sconces. The bar room has a freestanding counter on the eastern wall, and several doorways on the walls have been modified or removed. The bar's original floor was made of marble, but this has since been covered by multiple types of materials, including carpets and hexagonal ceramic tiles.

The vaulted ceilings of the room and bar were made of Guastavino tiles in a blue, tan, and aqua color scheme. The ceiling of the bar is about 8 ft (2.4 m) tall, lower than that of the grill room. The vaults of the bar's ceiling are separated by arches with blue terracotta bands on their soffits. The underside of each arch has ivory-colored flower motifs, some of which have grotesque heads placed atop them. From outside to inside, the vaults are surrounded by ivory-colored moldings; a blue tile band; a frieze with red, yellow, and green tiles and ivory-colored rosettes; and an aqua tile band. Each of the ceiling vaults is made of textured tiles with a meander motif. The tiles are laid in a herringbone pattern. The ceiling of the northwestern bay is divided into two sections; the southern half retains its original vault while the northern half is a flat black ceiling. Brass and glass lamps are suspended from the ceiling. The gallery's ceiling was designed similarly, but the vaults were shallower. The main grill room's ceiling also contained cut glass chandeliers.

==== Other stories ====
Originally, the Vanderbilt Hotel had 585 or 600 rooms. The total included 457 bedrooms and 57 parlors. The rooms could be rearranged into suites with several bedrooms leading off a parlor. The units in the hotel's southern wing were designed as long-term residential apartments and had their own bank of elevators. The other wings were used as short-term transient accommodations and were served by a central bank of elevators. The top two stories contained a private apartment for A. G. Vanderbilt's family and had nine rooms, served by their own elevator. There were also several dressing rooms on the mezzanine level for guests who wanted to attend a formal function, such as a dinner, without actually using a room at the hotel. The third floor contained servants' suites, as well as pipes and electrical ducts.

When the hotel opened, its general manager said the hotel's design sought to "eliminate the red and gold idea in hotel decoration". The rooms were mostly decorated in stone; the tops of each wall were decorated with stone friezes. There were metal sockets embedded in the concrete floor slabs, to which the hotel's custom-made rugs were attached. The walls were paneled, and the baseboards were made of marble. On the upper floors, each room was designed in an Adam or Georgian style; each floor was designed differently. American Architect magazine said the hotel had an "Oriental flavor and a Renaissance grace to be seen everywhere", with furnishings inspired by Chinese architecture. Each guest room's salon had a reproduction of a classical oil painting. The decorative patterns extended to small details, such as cameo heads on the cast-iron balustrades of the staircases. The rooms also had Wedgwood doorknobs, which guests stole repeatedly.

The hotel also included other features for guest comfort. Each unit had its own bathroom with hot and cold taps. An electric bell in each room allowed patrons to call for room service without leaving their rooms. These bells were themselves placed within iron boxes to prevent the sound from disturbing other guests. There were telephones on the desk of each room, as well as pneumatic tubes connecting each room with the hotel's main office. As a fireproofing measure, the rooms did not contain wood decorations, except for small wooden shelves in the rooms. The building also contained hollow metal doors, trim, and window frames.

After 1967, the hotel was converted into 364 apartments on the upper stories, ranging from studios to three-bedroom units. Three of the apartments, each with two to three bedrooms, were fully furnished units for residents' overnight guests. Six office floors were created below the apartments, and there were also storefronts and a garage. The office floors measure 80,000 ft^{2} (7,400 m^{2}) and consist of three of the basement levels, as well as the first through third stories above ground. The parking garage, accessed from 33rd Street, spans four levels and can fit 150 cars.

== History ==
By the first decade of the 20th century, the upscale residences along Fourth and Park Avenues were being replaced with commercial structures. The area bounded by Madison Avenue, 34th Street, Lexington Avenue, and 38th Street, including both sides of Park Avenue within that region, was excluded from such development. This was because of the Murray Hill Restrictive Agreement, which was enacted in 1847 and restricted the development of non-residential buildings in that area. (Note: The covenant covered both sides of Lexington, Madison, and Park Avenues and 34th, 35th, 36th, and 37th Streets, as well as the south side of 38th Street. It was repealed in 1916.) The restriction extended 100 ft (30 m) south of 34th Street, including the future Vanderbilt Hotel site.

=== Development ===
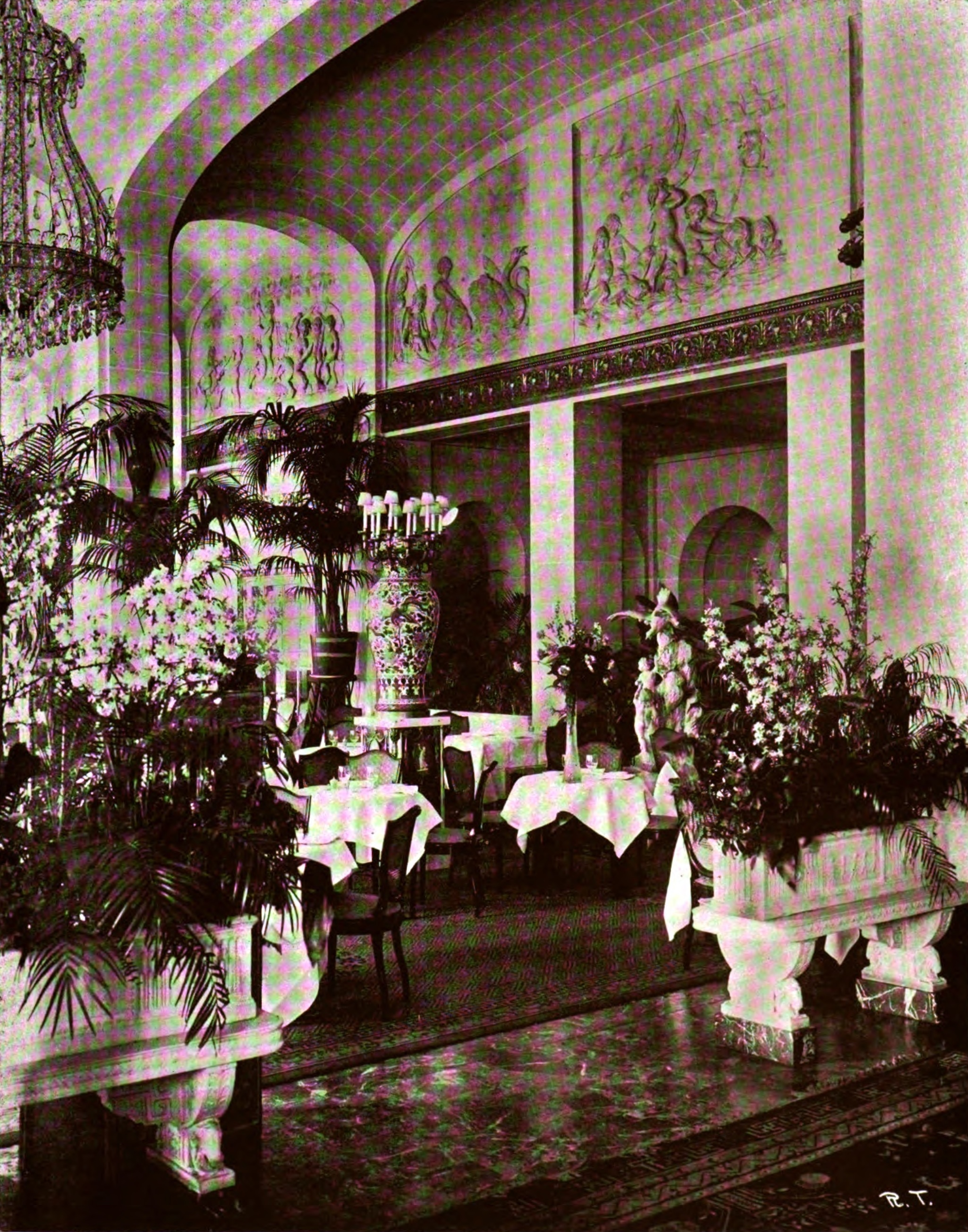
Lobby-level dining room

Alfred Gwynne Vanderbilt acquired additional land next to his family's old estate in 1907. That November, Vanderbilt leased part of the estate to the City Leasing Company, which planned to erect a building on the site. Later that month, Warren and Wetmore filed plans for a 21-story office and loft building, to be built on the west side of Park Avenue between 33rd and 34th Streets. The building would have cost $1 million. There would have been stores on the ground floor, manufacturing lofts on the next four stories, and offices above. The first six stories would have had a brick and limestone facade; the remaining floors would have been made of brick and terracotta. The building would have had a metal roof 300 ft (91 m) high. At the time, the site was diagonally across from a trolley depot. The New York Times said: "Mr. Vanderbilt would not do this unless he had definite knowledge as to the future of the Fourth Avenue car barn block."

In December 1908, Vanderbilt filed plans for a 19-story hotel on the site. Existing tenants were asked to leave the site by June 1909. Part of the hotel was to be within the Murray Hill restricted zone. However, the neighborhood's residents did not file any lawsuit against his plans in the year after he filed them. The law firm of Carter Ledyard & Milburn (who represented financier J. P. Morgan Jr., a supporter of the restricted zone) told Vanderbilt that it might file an injunction against him if the hotel plans proceeded, but Vanderbilt proceeded anyway. By August 1909, the buildings on the site were being cleared. The New York Times said the Vanderbilt Hotel, along with the Cameron Building at Madison Avenue and 34th Street, was evidence of the "weakening" of the Murray Hill restricted zone. The United Hotels Company of America, which was formed in 1910, agreed to operate the Vanderbilt Hotel as one of its first properties.

The William L. Crow Company started constructing the hotel in March 1910. That July, Warren and Wetmore filed plans for a two-story structure at 45–47 East 33rd Street, directly to the west, to protect westward views from the hotel. That building was used as a ventilation shaft for the Pennsylvania Railroad's East River Tunnels. The bricklayers' unions went on strike in September 1910, temporarily halting all work on the hotel. Work was again paused in September 1911, when all laborers went on strike in support of the marble polishers' union, which had gone on strike for several weeks. At the time, the marble was being installed in the hotel. Most laborers returned to work shortly afterward, but the marble laborers continued striking until the end of the year. By the end of 1911, the hotel was ready to receive guests. The hotel cost $4 million, of which $700,000 was spent on furnishings alone.

=== Hotel use ===
==== 1910s and 1920s ====
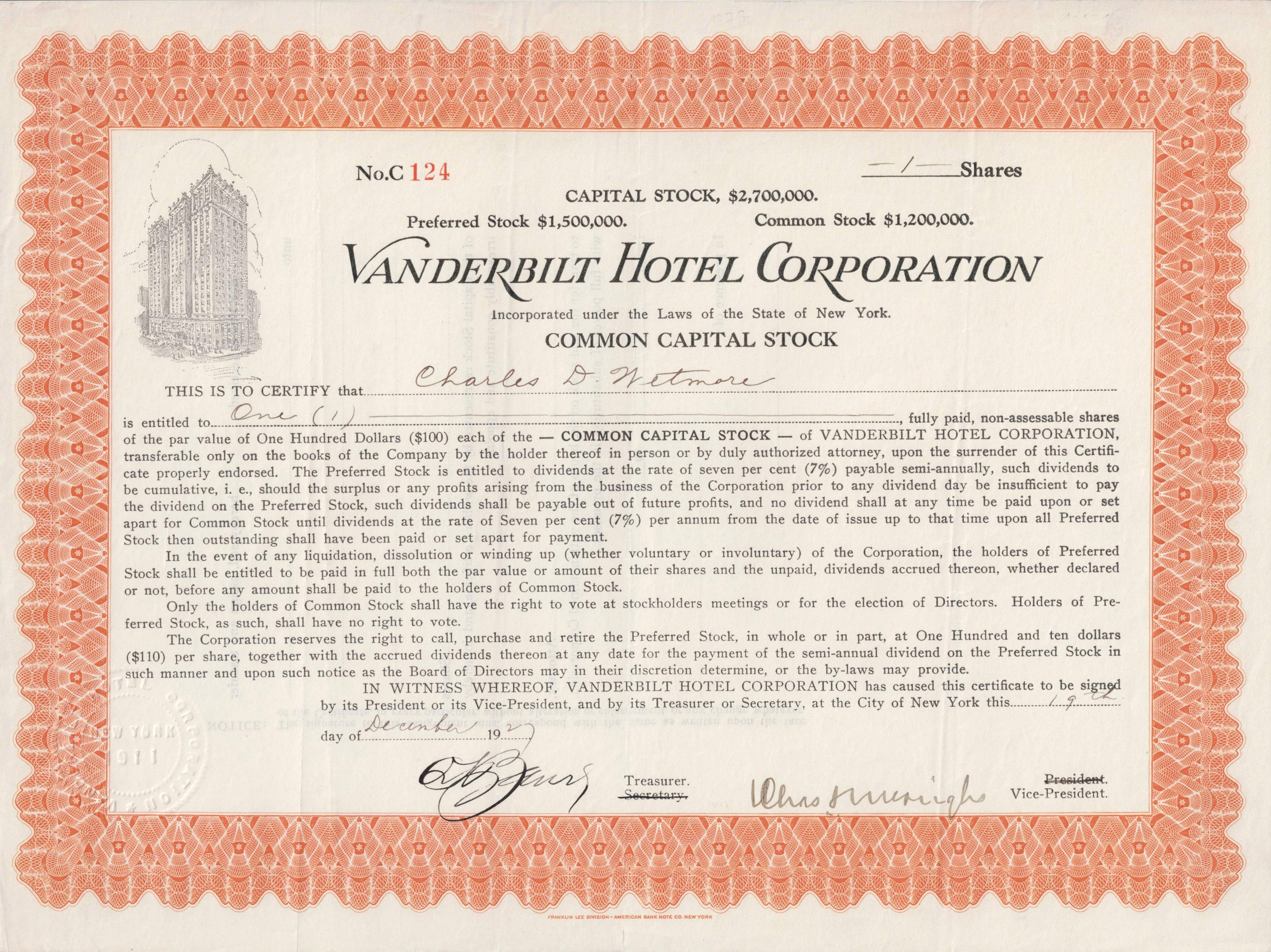
Share of the Vanderbilt Hotel Corporation, issued December 19, 1927

The hotel opened to guests on January 10, 1912, under general manager Thomas M. Hilliard and assistant manager Walton H. Marshall. At the time, the furnishings were incomplete. Three days after the hotel opened, the third floor was damaged in a fire, though the hotel's fireproof construction limited the extent of the damage. The Vanderbilt Hotel originally contained New York City's first women-only bar; barely any women used the bar, so it was converted to a men's bar two weeks after the hotel opened. All work at the hotel was completed by March 1913, and a children's playroom opened on the hotel's first floor that October. A. G. Vanderbilt lived at his penthouse apartment for only three years, dying during the sinking of the RMS Lusitania in 1915. The Women's City Club of New York leased Vanderbilt's apartment as a clubhouse early the next year, but it only occupied the apartment until 1918. The Vanderbilt penthouse was occupied in the 1920s by figures such as tenor Enrico Caruso and politician William Gibbs McAdoo.

The Vanderbilt soon became a popular meeting place for companies in the textile and women's apparel industries. In its early years, the hotel hosted events such as luncheons, meetings for the private Paul Jones Club, and a party for Warren G. Harding's 1920 presidential campaign. The hotel's guests included businessman Diamond Jim Brady, actor Rudolph Valentino, philosopher Henri Bergson, ballroom dancer Irene Castle, and actresses Maude Adams, Dorothy Gish, and Lillian Gish. Even after Caruso's death in 1921, the hotel continued to serve his favorite casserole for decades. The hotel was the subject of the United States' first skywriting advertisement in 1922, when Royal Air Force captain Cyril Turner spelled out "Hello USA", followed by "Call Vanderbilt 7200" (the hotel's phone number), over Times Square. The hotel received 47,000 phone calls in the three hours following the stunt.

A syndicate led by Edmund L. Baylies, William A. Chanler, the general manager Walton H. Marshall, and the hotel's architect Charles D. Wetmore bought the hotel in October 1925. The hotel continued to host events and meetings by groups like the New York Newspaper Woman's Club, the National Council of Women of the United States, and the United States Lawn Tennis Association. Harper's Bazaar magazine described the hotel's Della Robbia Restaurant in 1929 as having "never lost its popularity".

==== 1930s to 1960s ====
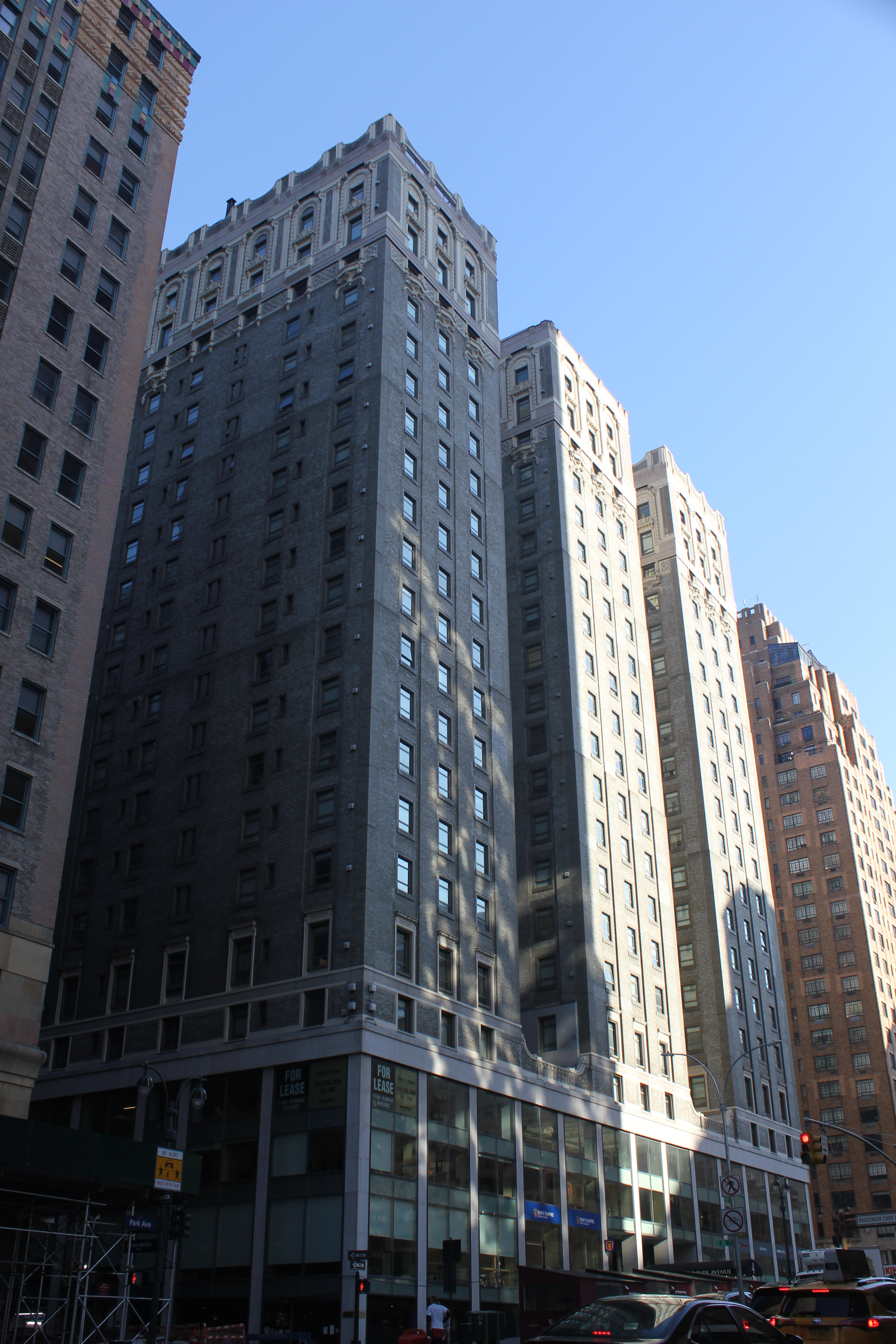
Seen from 33rd Street

The Park Avenue Club opened a clubhouse within the top three stories of the hotel in 1933. In March 1935, the New York Life Insurance Company moved to foreclose on the hotel's second mortgage loan of $200,000. Marshall, who had directed the hotel from its opening, remained in his position as its general manager. New York Life acquired the hotel that May at a foreclosure auction in which it bid $2.419 million. By November 1935, the Knott Management Corporation had taken over the Vanderbilt's operation for New York Life. Knott then appointed Oscar Banse as the hotel's new general manager. During the late 1930s, the hotel hosted exhibitions such as the Pottery and Glassware Show. A guide in 1939 described the Vanderbilt as "one of the hotels in New York that has kept its popularity for many years".

Manger Hotels bought the Vanderbilt Hotel from New York Life in February 1941, though the hotel's management was retained. Plans for minor alterations to the hotel building were filed in 1948. The next year, the Vanderbilt's general manager Thomas J. Kelly II announced that air-conditioning would be installed in 100 of the suites. During the 1950s and 1960s, the hotel hosted events like an exhibit of furniture, a showcase of a rare Bible, and a stamp-issuance ceremony. The hotel was known as the Manger Vanderbilt by the mid-1950s. The Della Robbia Restaurant continued to operate within the Manger Vanderbilt, and the hotel also had other eateries such as the Purple Tree. The architectural firm of Finn and Jenter filed plans in 1956 for the installation of a central air conditioning system at the hotel, which was to cost $500,000.

By the 1960s, patronage at the Vanderbilt had dropped significantly from its heyday, and there was also rising demand for office space in Manhattan. The New York Daily News announced in December 1965 that the Vanderbilt Hotel would close to make way for an office building. Manger closed the Vanderbilt on January 1, 1966. The Vanderbilt was one of several hotels in New York City to close that year, removing a combined 5,489 rooms from the market.

=== Office and apartment use ===
==== Conversion and early tenants ====
A group led by John Marqusee bought the Vanderbilt from Manger Hotels in April 1966 for $3.625 million. The lowest three stories and the basements were converted to offices, while the upper 18 stories would be modified into residences. Setrick Construction Corporation was hired as the main contractor. The project also involved architectural firm Schuman, Lichtenstein & Claman; structural engineers Jerry Belcher and Associates; and mechanical engineers Larry Mayer and Associates. Marqusee chose to convert the existing building rather than replace it because, under zoning laws, a new building would have been restricted to a smaller floor area. The project was one of several mixed-use buildings being developed in Manhattan at the time. Marqusee planned to market the apartments to office workers who lived in the suburbs and needed to stay in the city during weekdays.

To make way for penthouses atop the building, the contractors removed the statues on the roof in June 1966. During the renovation, workers also discovered a room with women's clothes and shoes, which had been sealed off with brick and was not in the building's blueprints. Even after the Vanderbilt's conversion had been completed in 1967, people sometimes visited the building in the belief that the hotel and its restaurants were still operational. M. H. Lanston leased one of the storefronts, using a portion of the Della Robbia Room as a storeroom, while Lerner Parking leased another portion of the restaurant space as a parking garage. Other early commercial tenants included Childs Restaurants, a branch office of stock brokerage EF Hutton, and United Cerebral Palsy.

==== 1980s to present ====
By the 1980s, Louis Feil of The Feil Organization owned the building. The New York City Landmarks Preservation Commission (LPC) conducted studies in 1984 to determine whether the former Vanderbilt Hotel was eligible for city-landmark status. The LPC found that, because the lower section of the facade had been substantially altered, the exterior did not hold as much architectural significance as the remaining parts of the interior. In 1987, Italian restaurant Fiori opened within the former Della Robbia Room. After the demolition of the Art Deco-style Marine Grill at nearby Herald Square in 1991, preservation group Friends of Terra Cotta started advocating for the remaining section of the room, the onetime Crypt, to be designated as an interior city landmark. The group started a petition and collected 500 signatures in support of this designation.

The Crypt was designated as a New York City interior landmark in 1994. By 1999, the Crypt was occupied by a restaurant called J. T.'s American-Italian Grill, operated by National Integrated Food Services. In 2002, Israel Berger & Associates restored the terracotta on the facade for $700,000. Afterward, architectural historian Mosette Broderick said the ground-floor alteration was old enough to be designated as a landmark, but Broderick did not believe that the modified facade still carried historical significance. The Crypt became the Vanderbilt Station restaurant in 2002. Two years later, Wolfgang's Steakhouse opened within the space.

During the 2010s, 4 Park Avenue contained the offices of property manager Charles H. Greenthal & Co., as well as a Crunch gym. The building underwent a capital renovation in the late 2010s and early 2020s. In 2021, the State University of New York's Empire State College leased the mezzanine and second floor; the Feil Organization still owned 4 Park Avenue. During that decade, the building's other commercial tenants included the Foundry Learning Center, ground-level stores for Duane Reade and Wolfgang's Steakhouse, and two companies within the basements.

== Impact ==
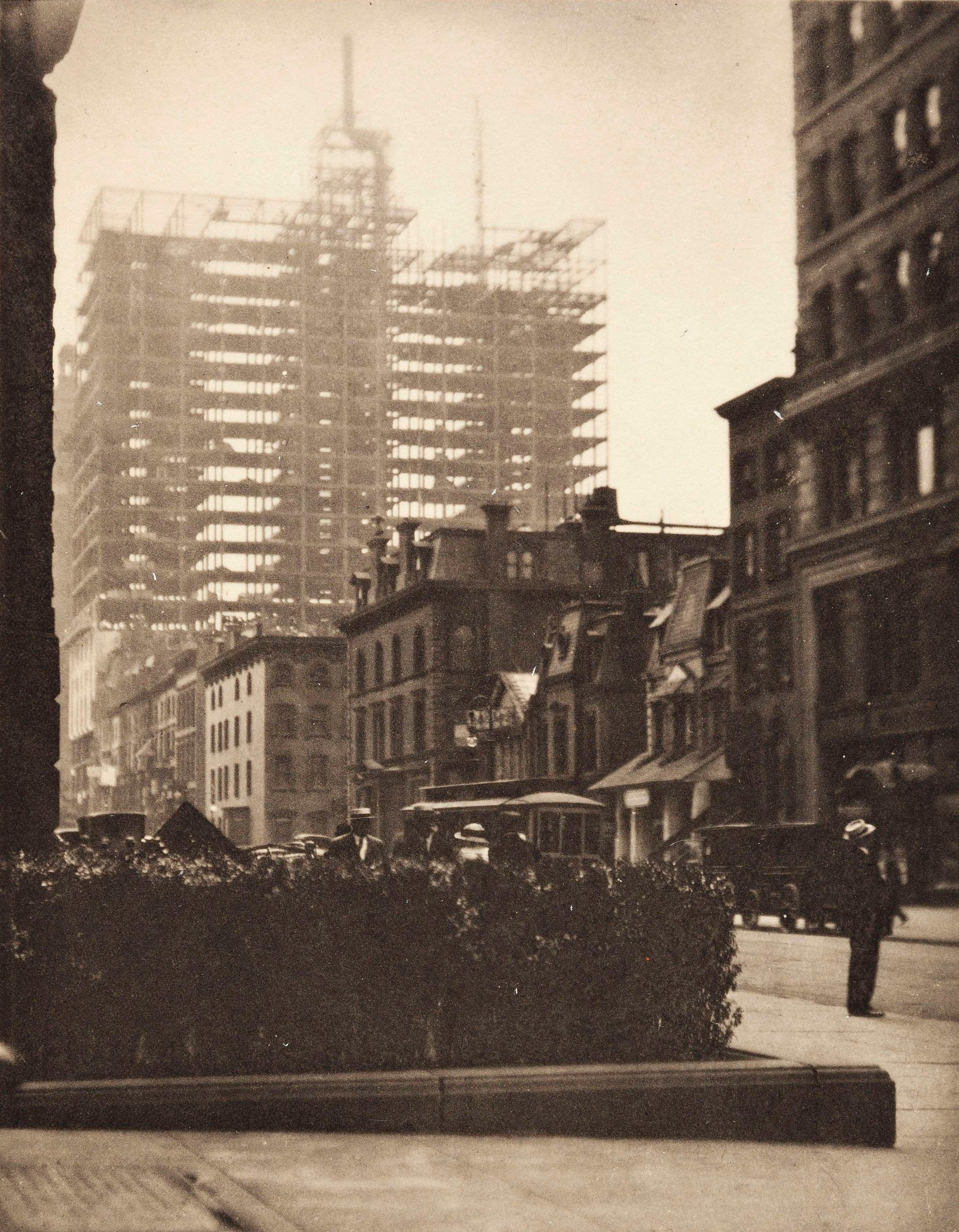
Alfred Stieglitz's 1910 work Old and New New York, showing the Vanderbilt Hotel under construction

When the hotel opened, one writer said: "The Hotel Vanderbilt [...] shows so liberal an appreciation of the modern spirit applied to hotel needs. It shows also an understanding of up-to-date construction and of refinement of decoration." Another magazine called the hotel "one of the most distinctive and imposing buildings in New York, and its position is commanding", as it was close to Grand Central. A contemporary observer said the Della Robbia Room was "an example of the most successful work of this kind that has been accomplished by American potters". Christopher Gray of The New York Times described the Della Robbia Room as a "vast double-height grotto of ceramic art", comparing the columns to trees and the ceiling to a forest canopy.

Following the building's 1960s renovation, Richard Peck of the Times wrote that the hotel had been "stripped of much of its former effulgence". According to architect Norval White, "the ravages to the ground floor have taken it off the preservation list".

The Vanderbilt Hotel has been shown in some works of media. As the building was being constructed in 1910, Alfred Stieglitz took a picture entitled Old and New New York, contrasting the growing steel frame of the emerging Vanderbilt Hotel with the old low-rise blocks of the street below. The hotel was also used as a filming location for So Young, So Bad in 1950.

== See also ==
- List of New York City Designated Landmarks in Manhattan from 14th to 59th Streets
