= Wolfgang's Steakhouse =

American steakhouse chain

Coordinates: 40.746777°N 73.982116°W

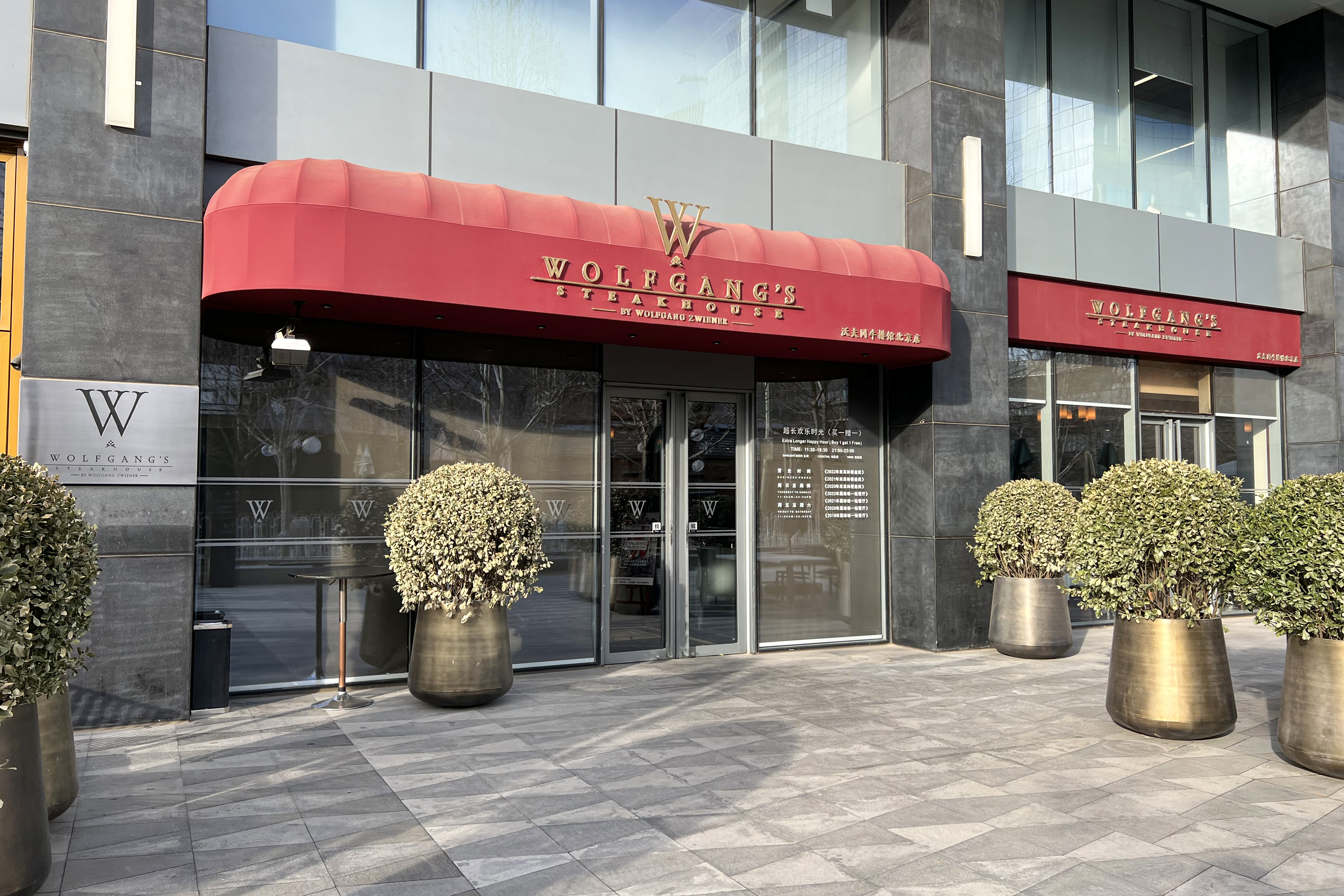
- Beijing branch in Sanlitun
- Interactive map of Wolfgang's Steakhouse

Restaurant information
- Established: 2004; 22 years ago
- Owner: Wolfgang Zwiener
- Head chef: Wolfgang Zwiener
- Food type: Steakhouse
- Location: 4 Park Avenue (flagship location), New York City, Manhattan, United States
- Other locations: Multiple locations
- Website: www.wolfgangssteakhouse.net

Wolfgang's Steakhouse is an American steakhouse chain whose flagship restaurant is located on Park Avenue in Manhattan, New York City. The restaurant was founded in 2004 by a former headwaiter at Peter Luger Steak House, Wolfgang Zwiener, who died in 2025. In 2014, a listicle in The Village Voice ranked the steakhouse's Park Avenue location as the sixth best steakhouse in New York City. The staff was described as "more efficient than warm" and the atmosphere as "gruff", by Frank Bruni of The New York Times in 2015. Patrons are encouraged to tip in $2 bills.

== History ==
Wolfgang's Steakhouse was founded in 2004 by Wolfgang Zwiener (1939–2025), the headwaiter at Peter Luger Steak House, with over 40 years of experience. Its first location is on 4 Park Avenue in Manhattan, within the former Della Robbia Bar, a designated New York City interior landmark.

As of 2015, the restaurant had expanded to about 35 worldwide locations, including New Jersey, California, Florida and various Asian locations, including Japan and South Korea. The first branch in the Philippines opened in February 2016 at Resorts World Manila; the country has since added five other branches. A branch opened on Duddell Street in Hong Kong in June 2017.

== See also ==
- List of restaurants in New York City
- List of steakhouses
