= General Electric Building =

Office skyscraper in Manhattan, New York

- U.S. National Register of Historic Places
- New York State Register of Historic Places
- New York City Landmark
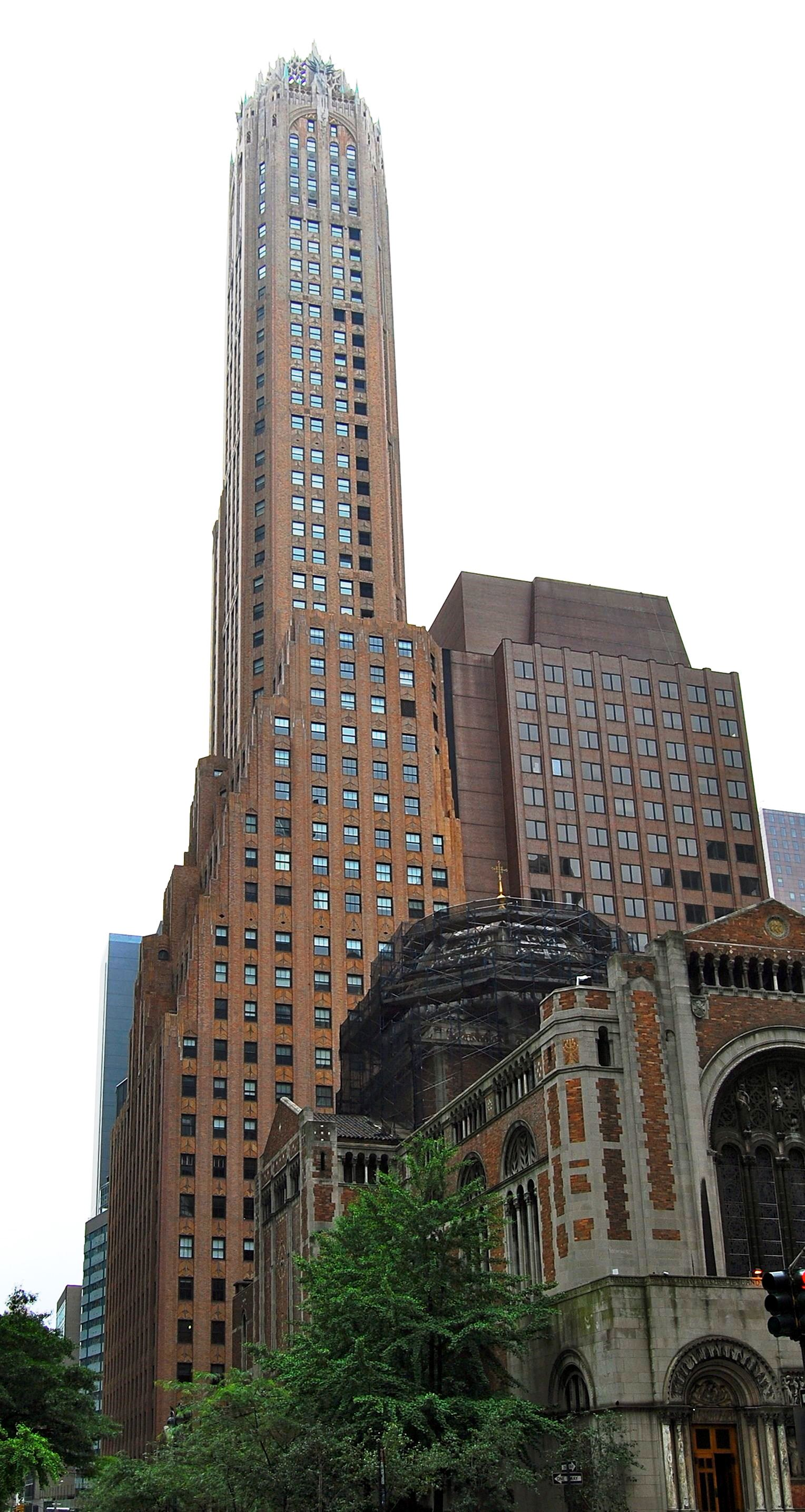
- The General Electric Building with St. Bartholomew's Church in the foreground in 2010
- Location: 570 Lexington Avenue; Manhattan, New York City
- Coordinates: 40°45′26″N 73°58′21″W
- Built: 1929–1931
- Architect: John W. Cross of Cross & Cross
- Architectural style: Art Deco
- Website: 570lexingtonave.com
- NRHP reference No.: 03001515
- NYSRHP No.: 06101.013198
- NYCL No.: 1412

Significant dates
- Added to NRHP: January 28, 2004
- Designated NYSRHP: December 3, 2003
- Designated NYCL: July 9, 1985

The General Electric Building, also known as 570 Lexington Avenue, is a skyscraper at the southwestern corner of Lexington Avenue and 51st Street in Midtown Manhattan, New York City. The building, designed by Cross & Cross and completed in 1931, was known as the RCA Victor Building during its construction. The General Electric Building is sometimes known by its address to avoid confusion with 30 Rockefeller Plaza, which was once known as the GE Building.

570 Lexington Avenue contains a 50-floor, 640-foot-tall (200 m) stylized Gothic octagonal brick tower, with elaborate Art Deco decorations of lightning bolts showing the power of electricity. The tower is set back from the round-cornered base with elaborate masonry and architectural figural sculpture. The building was designed to blend with the low Byzantine dome of the adjacent St. Bartholomew's Episcopal Church on Park Avenue, with the same brick coloring and architectural terracotta decoration. The crown of the building, an example of Gothic tracery, is intended to represent electricity and radio waves. On the corner above the building's main entrance is a clock with the cursive GE logo and a pair of disembodied silver arms holding bolts of electricity.

Plans for the building were announced in 1929, and it was completed two years later. The project was originally commissioned for RCA, then a subsidiary of General Electric (GE). RCA moved to 30 Rockefeller Plaza midway through construction, and 570 Lexington Avenue was conveyed to GE as part of an agreement in which RCA and GE split their properties. GE had its headquarters at 570 Lexington Avenue between 1933 and 1974, and retained ownership until 1993, when the building was donated to Columbia University. The building was extensively renovated by Ernest de Castro of the WCA Design Group in the 1990s. It was designated a New York City landmark in 1985 and was added to the National Register of Historic Places in 2004.

== Site ==
The General Electric Building occupies the southwestern corner of Lexington Avenue and 51st Street in the Midtown Manhattan neighborhood of New York City. It sits on the northeastern portion of a city block bounded by Park Avenue to the west, 50th Street to the south, Lexington Avenue to the east, and 51st Street to the north. St. Bartholomew's Episcopal Church is directly to the west on the same city block, and another office building is to the south. The General Electric Building is also near the Waldorf Astoria New York to the south, 569 Lexington Avenue and the Beverly Hotel to the east, and 345 Park Avenue to the north. Entrances to the New York City Subway's Lexington Avenue/51st Street station, served by the 6, <6>, E, F, and <F> trains, are adjacent to the north side of the building.

The lots making up the General Electric Building's site were purchased by Frederick and Maximilian Schaefer starting in 1867, and were developed as the Schaefer Brewery in 1878. The Park Avenue railroad tracks, running in an open cut less than a block west of the site, were placed underground as part of the construction of Grand Central Terminal in the early 20th century. The opening of Grand Central Terminal in 1913 spurred development in the area bounded by Lexington Avenue, Madison Avenue, 51st Street, and 42nd Street. St. Bartholomew's Church bought the Schaefer site in 1914. The church's main building was erected on the block's northwestern corner in 1919, and St. Patrick's Cathedral developed Cathedral High School on the southeastern corner in 1924. After St. Bartholomew's built its chapter house and garden on the block's southwestern corner, the Schaefer site was the only one on the block that was not developed.

== Architecture ==
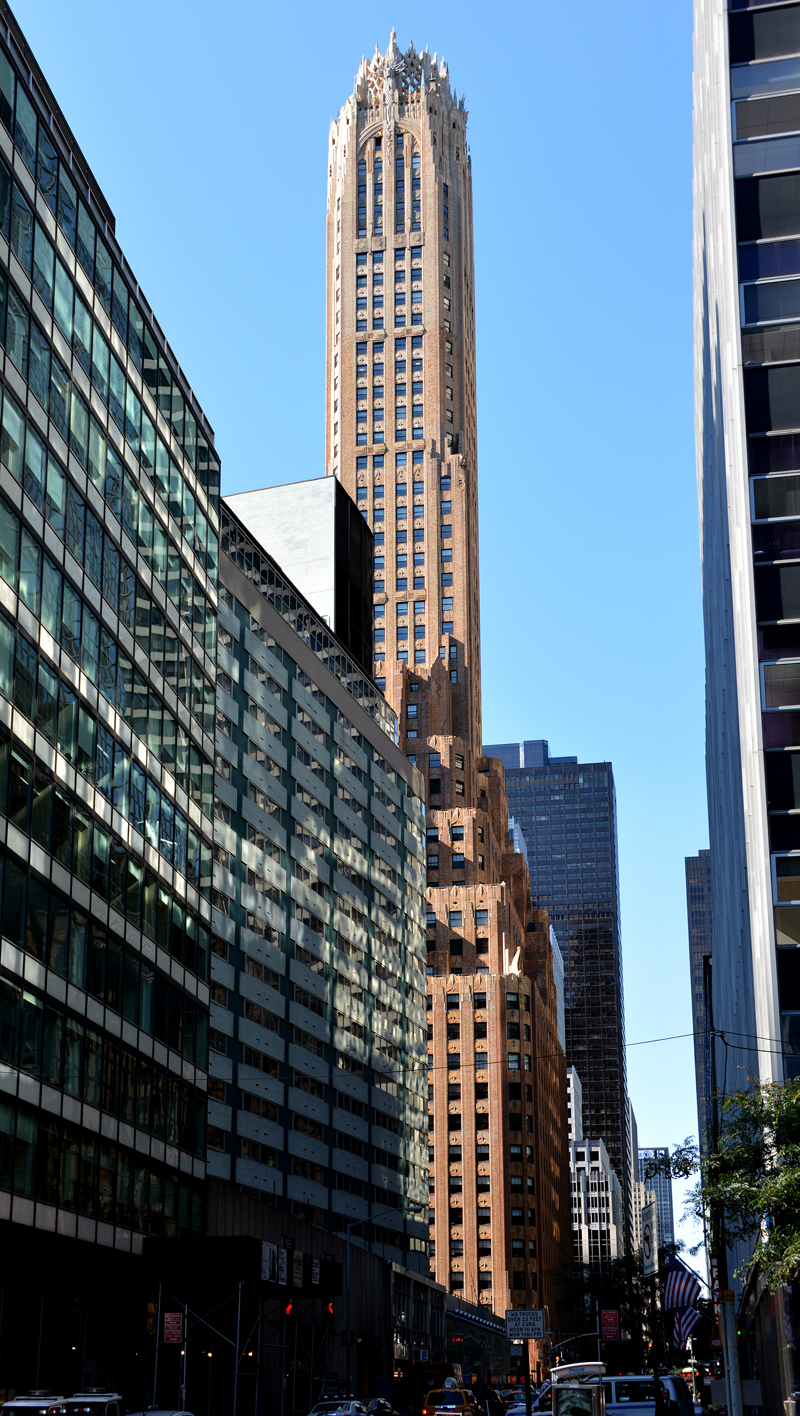
The General Electric Building's Art Deco facade seen from the west on 51st Street

The General Electric Building was designed by John Walter Cross of Cross & Cross in the Art Deco style with Gothic Revival ornamentation. This contrasted with the firm's earlier designs, which tended to be in the Gothic Revival, Georgian Revival, or Renaissance Revival styles. The Bartholomew Building Corporation originally developed 570 Lexington Avenue for RCA, though the building was renamed for General Electric (GE) midway through construction when RCA decided to instead occupy 30 Rockefeller Plaza. The steel was erected by McClintic-Marshall Construction Company, and the concrete floor arches were contracted to Brennan & Sloan.

The building was designed to harmonize with neighboring structures, particularly St. Bartholomew's Episcopal Church, as well as the since-demolished building of Cathedral High School to the south. There are 50 stories (consisting of 46 office floors and four mechanical floors); the 48th and 49th floors also once contained executive dining rooms. Sources disagree slightly on the building's precise height. Emporis gives a height of 640 feet (195 m), while the Council on Tall Buildings and Urban Habitat's Skyscraper Center cites the building as being 643 feet (196 m).

=== Form ===
The building's lowest stories contain elaborate masonry and architectural figural sculpture, with a round corner facing Lexington Avenue and 51st Street. Above a series of gradual setbacks, the building rises into an octagonal brick tower similar to Cross & Cross's earlier design for 20 Exchange Place. It is a stylized Gothic tower, with elaborate Art Deco decorations of lightning bolts showing the power of electricity. According to the New York City Landmarks Preservation Commission, the base and tower form "one of the most expressive skyscrapers of its era".

The lowest twelve stories fill the entire lot area. Between the 13th and 25th stories, the building contains shallow setbacks on each elevation, which are used to emphasize the building's vertical lines. The Lexington Avenue and 51st Street elevations contain setbacks on the 13th, 16th, 19th, and 22nd floors, and the Lexington Avenue elevation also has a setback at the 25th floor. The centers of the Lexington Avenue and 51st Street elevations contain projecting pyramidal dormers that rise one to three additional stories above the previous setback. The building's tower rises 25 stories above these setbacks. The corners of the tower are chamfered to form an eight-sided floor plan, except on the building's northeast corner below the 35th floor, which is not chamfered.

=== Facade ===
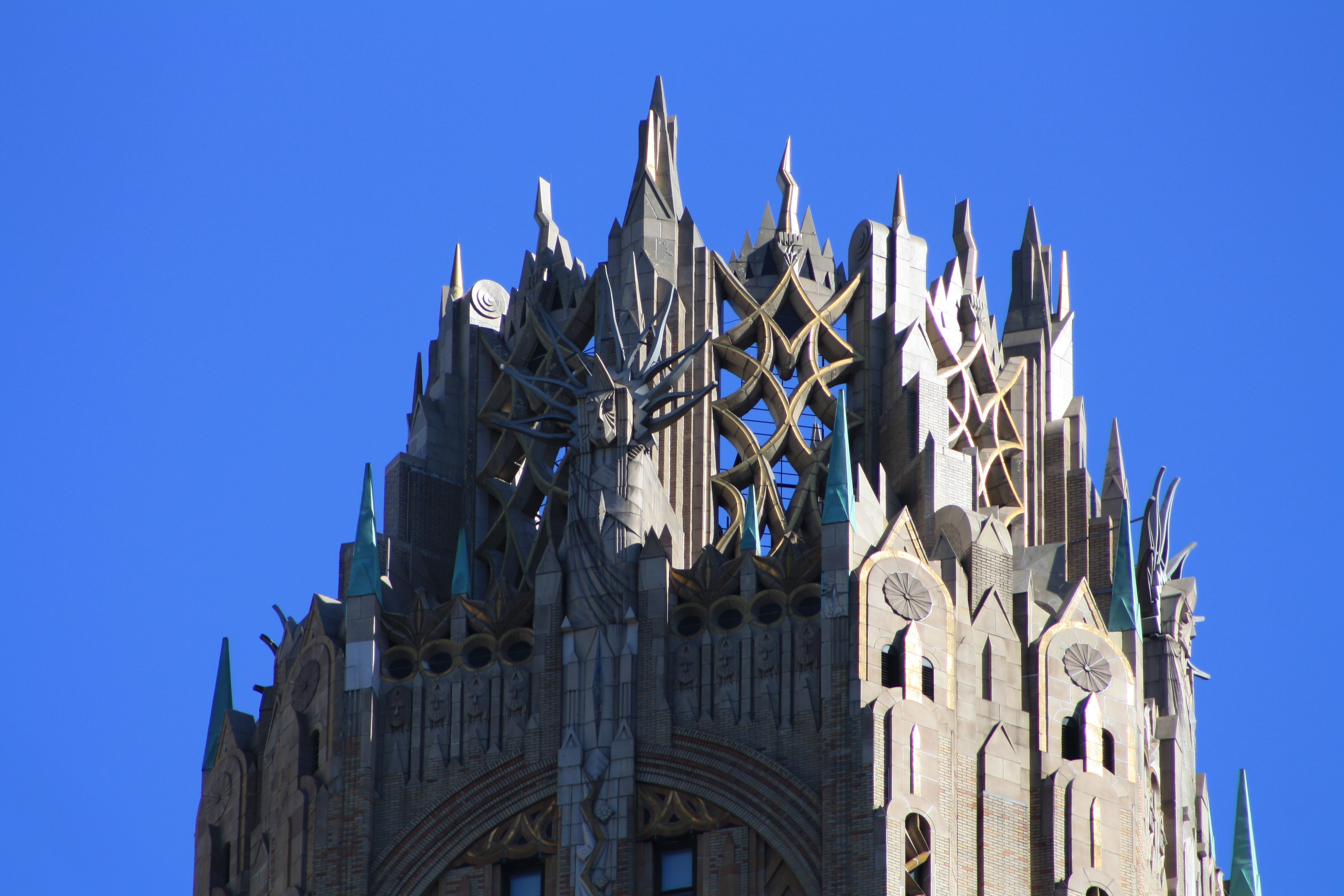
Detailed view of the crown

The facade was designed to blend with the low Byzantine dome of St. Bartholomew's Church and shares the same brick color, with terracotta decorations chosen to coordinate. Brick in orange, tawny, and buff colors was used throughout the facade. The bricks, laid out randomly in American bond, create from a distance the impression of a rich bronze color.

The window sills, corbels, spandrels, and other elements on the facade are made of terracotta in similar shades. The terracotta details include reliefs that depict lightning. The lowest section of the ground-story facade is made of reddish granite, and some of the upper-story trimmings are made of reddish marble. The terracotta on the upper stories was sprayed with fourteen-carat gold. The detail of the facade wraps around to its rear elevations as well.

The facade contains few flat surfaces. The design is emphasized by rounded vertical piers, which separate the facade into bays, and recessed spandrels, which separate the windows between each floor. The piers rise above and between the openings of the first floor. The spandrels are mostly similar in design. On the building's primary elevations, the upper section of a typical spandrel contains a large chevron made of fluted bars, while the lower section contains two half-size chevrons with smaller fluting. Running vertically along the center of each spandrel is a lozenge-shaped bolt with aluminized finishing. The bolt probably represents the radio industry, though architectural historian Anthony W. Robins writes that the bolt has also been compared to sound waves on a RCA Victrola.

==== First floor ====
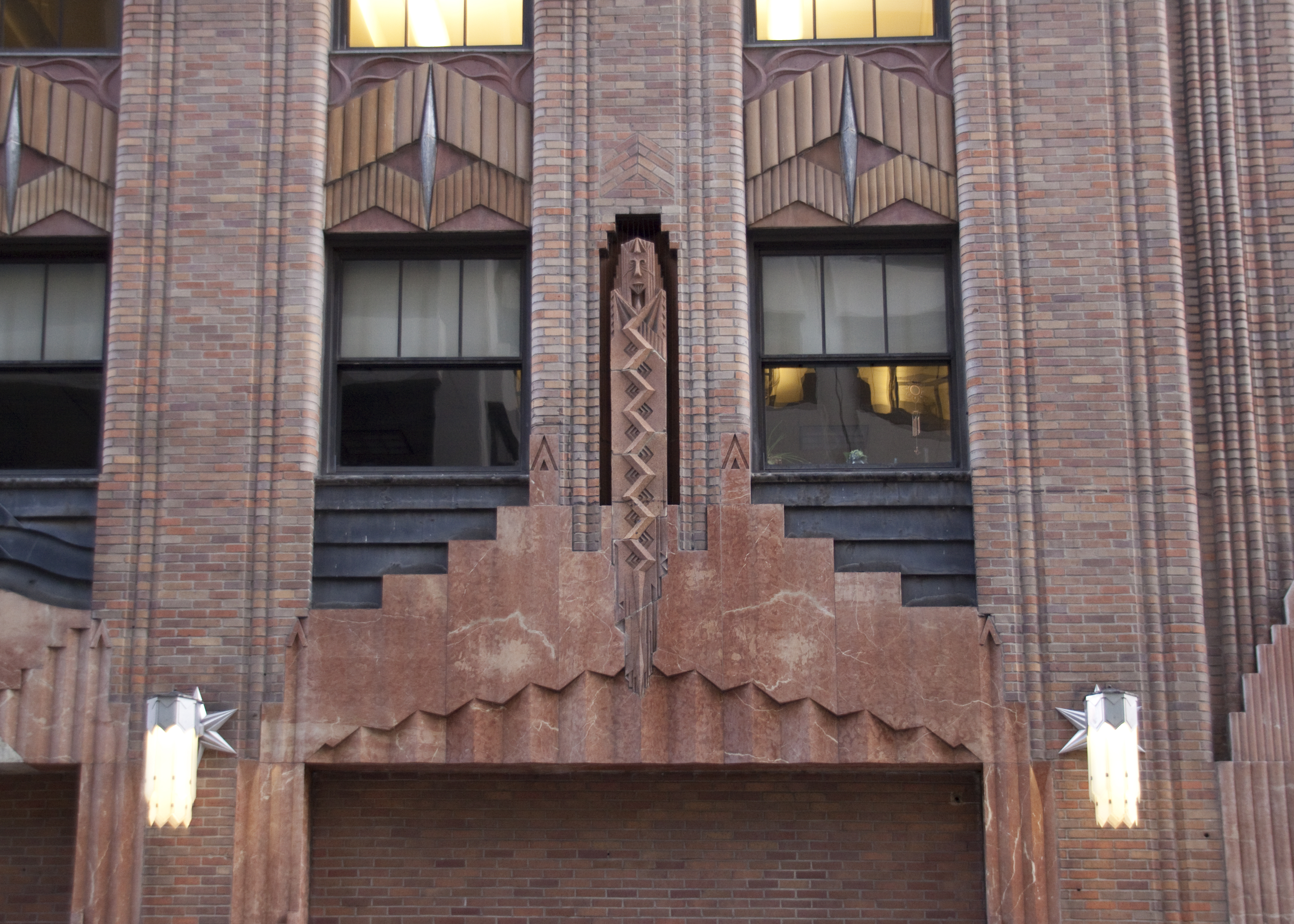
Pediment above the loading dock

At ground level, the facade contains display windows with storefronts; the large display windows are two bays wide, while the small display windows are one bay wide. The Lexington Avenue elevation has four large display windows, two on either side of the main entrance. The 51st Street elevation has four large and two small display windows, a two-bay-wide loading dock, and a one-bay-wide freight entrance. The display windows and loading dock are each surrounded by a red marble frame containing reeded jambs. Above each display window is a triangular pediment with a fluted tympanum; a stepped pediment frame; and a niche in the pier above the center of the pediment, containing a representation of an "electric spirit". The pediments above the main entrance and freight entrance are more elaborate.

The main entrance is on Lexington Avenue and contains three single-leaf metal doors. Instead of doorknobs, each door contains a push-plate with a zigzag design. The Lexington Avenue entrance is topped by a transom window with interlocking triangles and curves. The pediment above the main entrance contains a metal sculpture with a curving vine and a lozenge along its center. The sculpture is flanked by depictions of pendants that are suspended from spiral scrolls. The pediment above the freight entrance contains an aluminum panel under a series of round brick semicircles; the doorway below is a simple metal door.

The building's northeast corner, facing Lexington Avenue and 51st Street contains a more ornate design than the rest of the facade, as it was intended to lead to a bank space on the first floor. At ground level, there is a non-structural buttress made of marble, with elaborate pediments above. The buttress consists of two bays, one facing each street, and is supported by a pier at the corner. On the pier is a clock with the cursive GE logo and a pair of disembodied silver arms holding bolts of electricity. The bays of the corner buttress are topped by tripartite triangular marble pediments, which feature a clenched fist holding an electric bolt, topped by a series of round brick semicircles.

Between the 2nd and 12th floors, the building's northeast corner is curved. The corner is two bays wide. The spandrels of the corner bays contain a pattern of three lozenges increasing in size from bottom to top, with the topmost lozenge containing an aluminized finish.

==== Upper stories ====
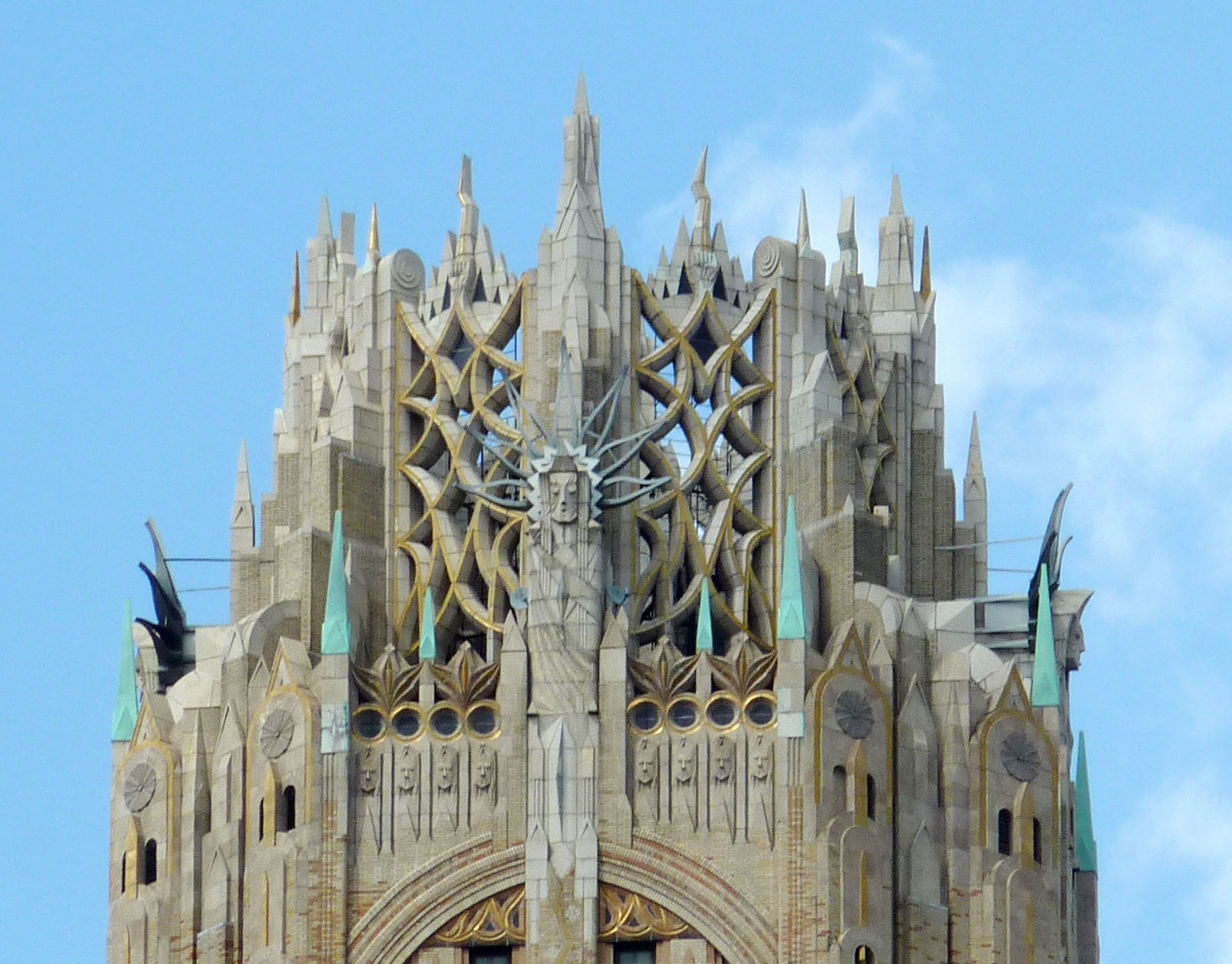
The crown of the building with its "electric waves" design

Above the 12th floor, the building's northeast corner contains a flat chamfer on each of the setback portions between the 12th and 21st floors. There are also three sculptures of "electric spirits" on the northeast corner: at the 12th floor, between the 23rd and 25th floors, and between the 34th and 35th floors. Because of the building's massing, these "electric spirits" are offset from the ground-level entrance. Stylized visages also overlook the central bays along both Lexington Avenue and 51st Street.

The tower contains four bays on each of the major elevations facing north, south, west, and east, as well as one bay in each chamfer. The spandrels between the 45th and 48th floors consist of raised circles with entirely aluminized finishing. An arch rises over the 49th floor of each major elevation. The central pier on each side rises above the arch to support one of four figures in the building's crown. Each of the 50-foot-tall (15 m) figures depicts a deity with "forked lightning" above them. The building's crown contains Gothic tracery touched with gold. The tracery is intended to represent electricity and radio waves. The "rays" of the deities can light up at night.

=== Features ===
The building has 428,000 square feet (39,800 m^{2}) of floor space according to The New York Times, although the Skyscraper Center gives the gross floor area as 458,295 square feet (42,577.0 m^{2}). The lowest floors typically contain 17,000 square feet (1,600 m^{2}) each, while the tower floors contain 3,000 square feet (280 m^{2}). The interior structure contains a myriad of columns supporting each floor.

The lobby is designed in the Art Deco style and consists of a small vestibule leading to a larger elevator lobby. According to one of the building's architects, John Cross, the lobby was an "interesting contrast" to the more conservative details of the facade. The lobby retains many elements of its original design, and some secondary spaces and offices still have some of their initial design elements. However, many floors have been remodeled. The original ornate features of the basement auditorium and the dining rooms at the 48th and 49th floors were removed.

==== Lobby ====
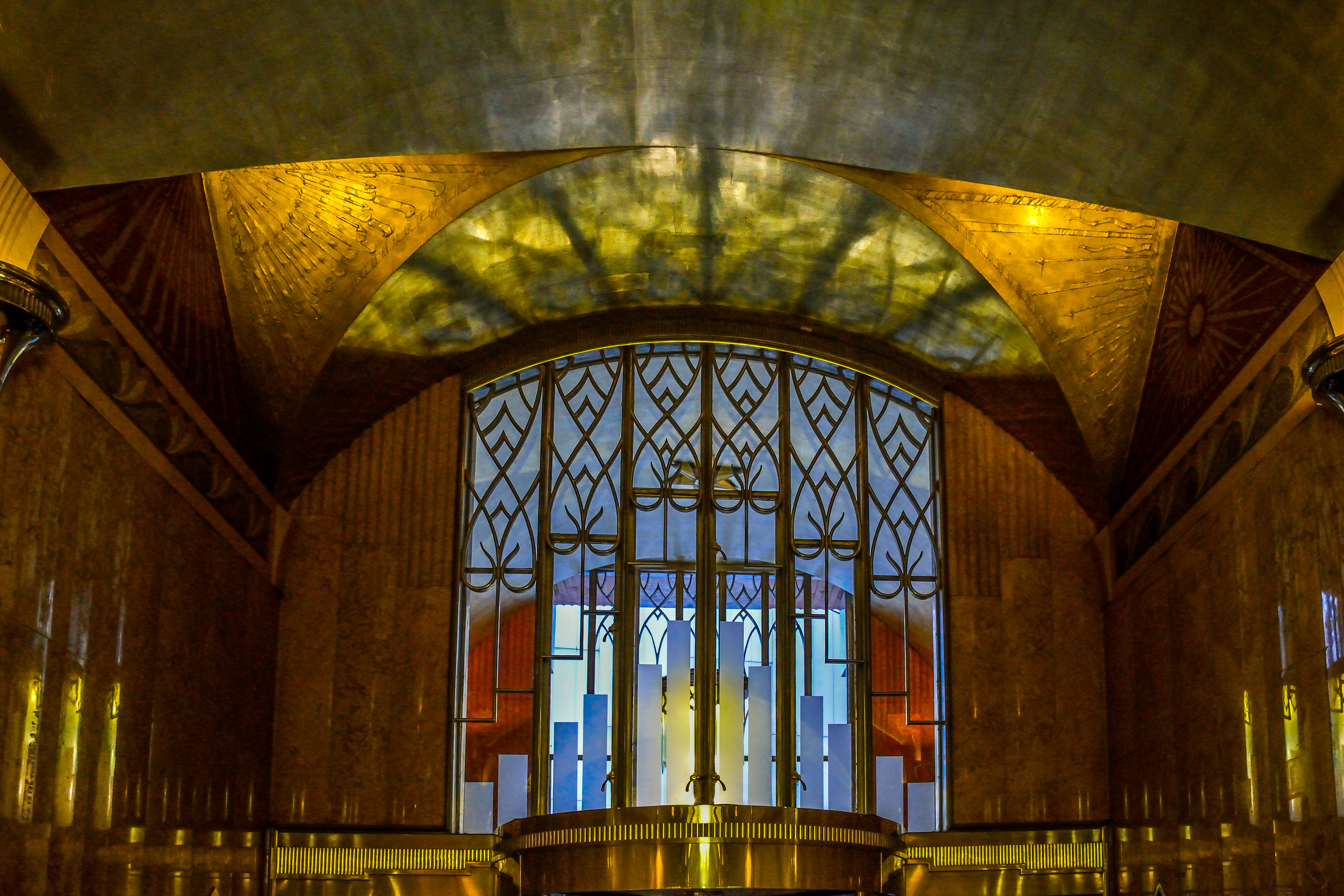
The building's entrance vestibule on Lexington Avenue

There is a vestibule inside the Lexington Avenue entrance, which contains a polished granite floor. Similar to the exterior, the walls of the vestibule consist of a red marble surface over a red-granite base. The side walls have decorative radiator grilles containing tall rectangles with angular tops. Atop the walls of the vestibule is a frieze consisting of a wave mosaic between beige marble bands; it is interrupted by two slightly projecting stones that serve as reflectors. Metal sconces, shaped like torches, are placed on the walls below the frieze. The vestibule's ceiling contains a smooth barrel vault with silver-leaf finishing, as well as an overhanging Art Deco chandelier. The vestibule and the building's lobby are separated by a marble wall. A metal revolving door flanked by two smaller doors leads to the lobby, while a transom window and decorative metal grille are above these doors.

John Cross had intended the design of the lobby to give off an impression of "vibrant energy". The lobby is a long, rectangular space extending west from the Lexington Avenue vestibule. The terrazzo floor contains elaborate geometric designs and marble highlights. The walls are made of convex pink marble panels with darker red veins, placed over a base made of white-veined black marble. The walls are topped by wave friezes and torch-shaped sconces, similar to those in the vestibule, although the lobby's western wall does not have a wave frieze. The lobby ceiling is made of barrel vaults painted in silver. The vaults rise in a lune shape, supported on slightly projecting stones along the length of the friezes atop each wall; the lunes touch at the apex of each vault. The vaults form triangular cut-outs above the frieze on either sidewall, each of which contain one of two mural designs with arrow motifs. Cross likened the illumination of the pink-marble walls to broadcast stations, while he described the triangular cut-outs on the ceiling as symbolizing "the directness and penetration of radio itself". The ceiling also contains three chandeliers, which were not part of the original design.

The lobby's western wall contains an opening that is closed-off by a metal Art Deco screen; this opening is topped by a decorative clock with a metal frame and a red-marble face. On the northern wall, a wide opening leads to a staircase to the basement as well as an adjacent commercial space. A similar opening on the south wall led to a waiting room and shopping arcade, but was sealed in 1995, when the security desk was installed in front of that opening. The elevator openings, five each on the northern and southern walls, contain painted metal doors with digital floor indicators above them. There are also openings leading from the lobby to various secondary spaces, as well as decorative grilles on the walls. The decorative details include a metal Art Deco mailbox on the south wall of the lobby.

Extending past the western wall of the lobby is a transverse corridor, which contains a similar ceiling design and terrazzo floors. This transverse corridor leads to a freight entrance with marble walls and decorative grilles on the freight doors. On the western side of the ground floor, south of the lobby, is an area with plain terrazzo floors and metal sconces; this space has a stairway to the basement.

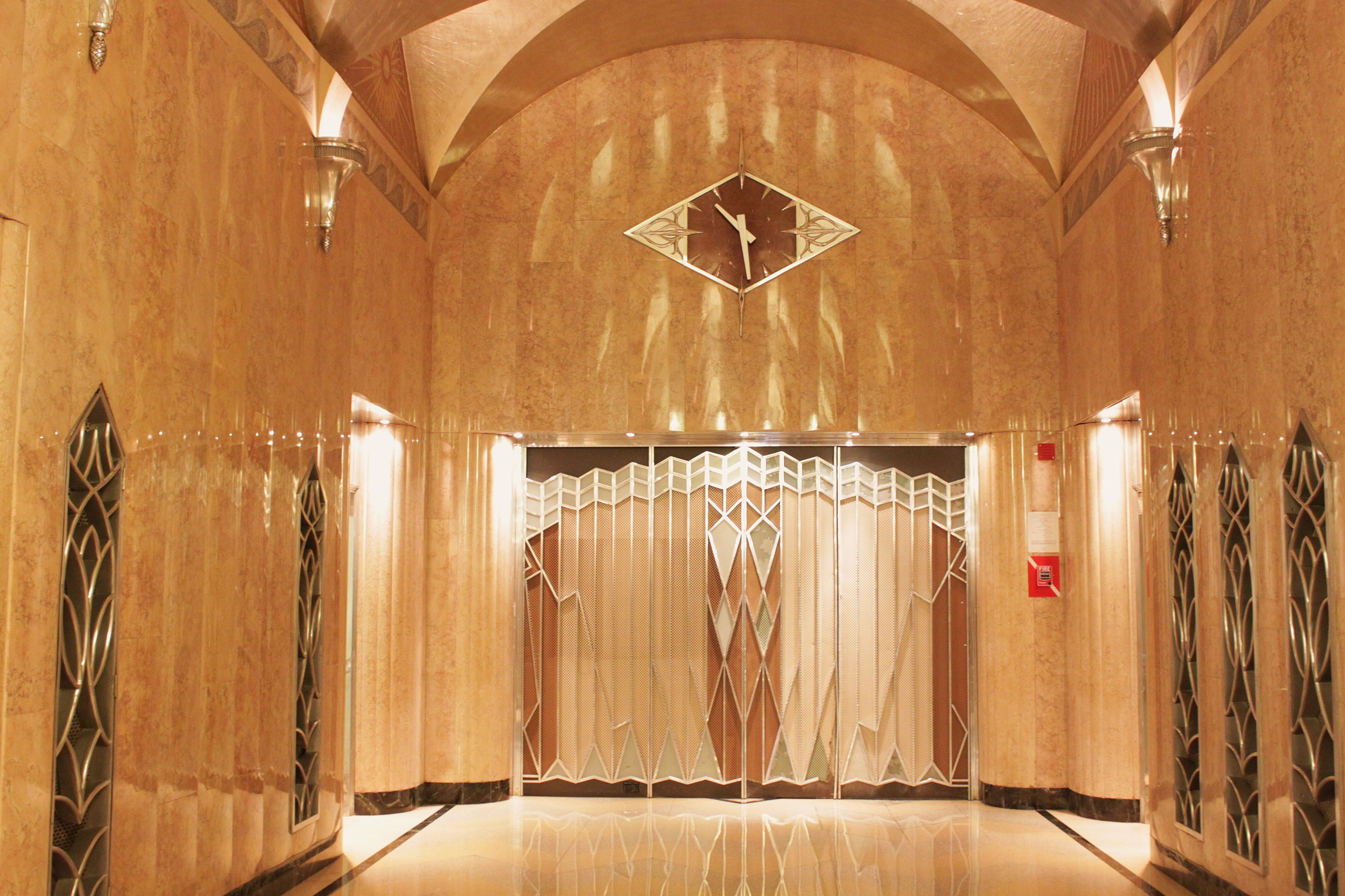
The western wall of the lobby

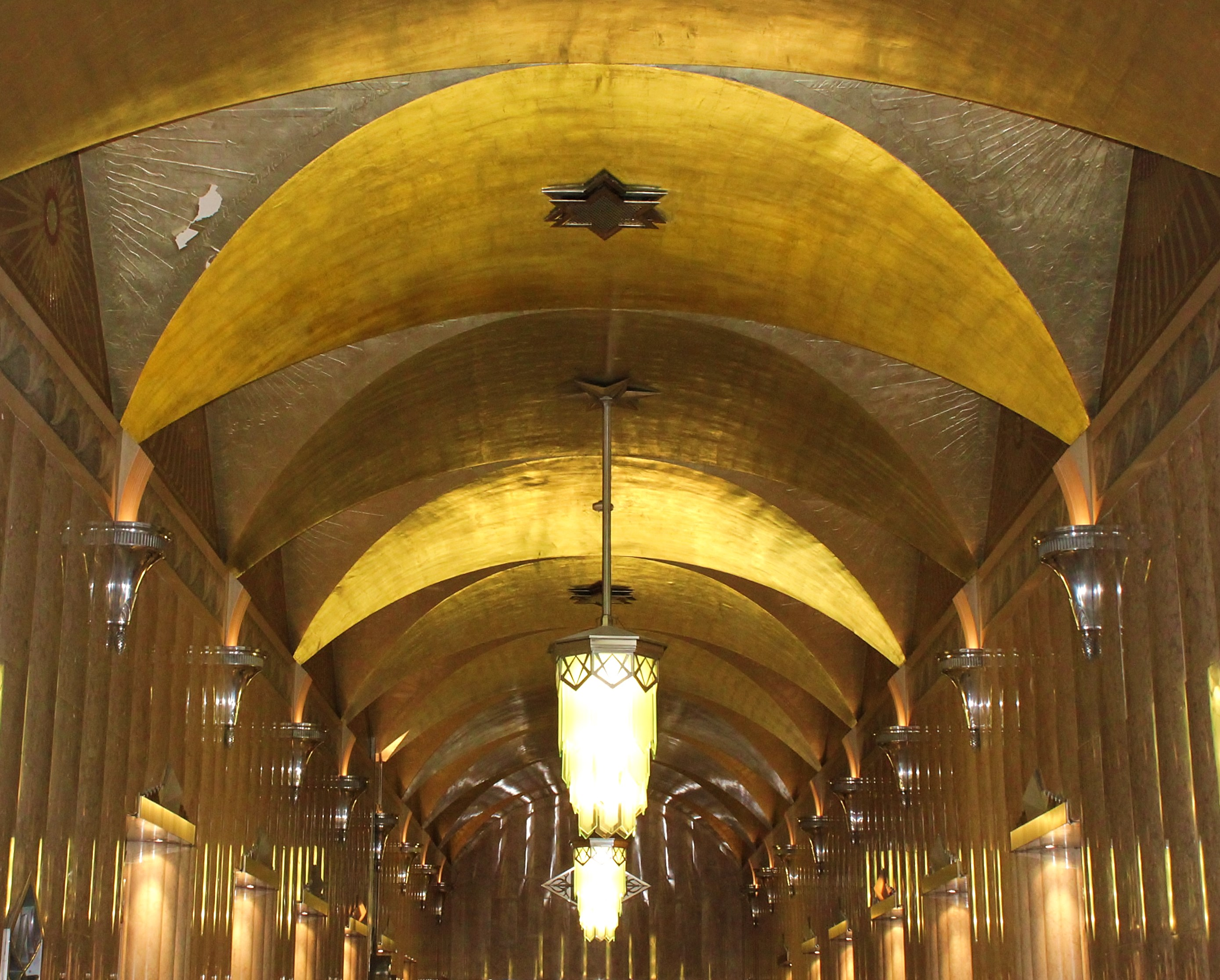
The lobby's ceiling, with its lune-shaped barrel vaults

==== Other floors ====
The ten elevators from the ground-floor lobby descend to the basement lobby, which contains a simpler design compared with the main lobby. The terrazzo floor is checkered, the walls are made of pink marble slabs, and the elevators contain their original floor indicators. Adjacent to the basement lobby is an auditorium with a plain sloped plaster ceiling and white walls, as well as a small stage. The Bartholomew Building Corporation arranged with the Interborough Rapid Transit Company, which at the time operated the 51st Street subway station, to construct an entrance to the station's downtown platform in the General Electric Building's basement. The basement entrance replaced a sidewalk staircase along 51st Street at Lexington Avenue. The passageway was made of marble with aluminum storefronts. A new street entrance opened in 1965, and the passageway was sealed off with a marble-clad partition.

The elevator cabs are inlaid with wood. The elevators also include white-metal railings and corner lights that date from the original design. The ceilings of the elevator cabs are made of silver leaf. During some point in the 20th century, the silver-leaf ceilings of the elevators were hidden from view, although they were restored at some point before 2003.

The upper floors were plainer in design compared with the public areas. As built, each story in the building's base contained elevator lobbies with terrazzo floors, as well as marble walls with wave mosaics. Smaller elevator lobbies existed in the floors of the tower, although many of these lobbies were removed during subsequent renovations, giving offices direct access to the elevators. The 48th and 49th floors, the highest usable stories in the General Electric Building, contained the executive dining rooms and were occupied by the General Electric Luncheon Club. The 48th floor had private rooms and the 49th floor had a large dining room. Raymond Hood and J. André Fouilhoux designed a "technologically advanced" conference room after GE moved into the building, which combined neon and mercury vapor lights to provide consistent indirect illumination. The conference room no longer exists.

== History ==
=== Planning ===
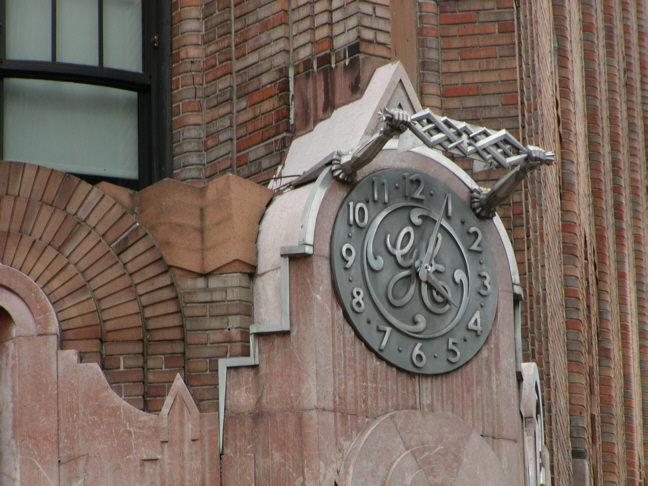
The GE clock above the corner entrance

In September 1929, Tishman Realty & Construction acquired plots at the southwestern corner of Lexington Avenue and 51st Street, passing it to the Bartholomew Building Corporation through intermediary Stanhope Estates Inc. The large corner lot was purchased from the Norko Realty Company and Julian Tishman & Sons, as well as two smaller lots on 51st Street from the Nichols Holding Company. The next month, the Bartholomew Building Corporation bought the land from Tishman. The site comprised 16,500 square feet (1,530 m^{2}) on the southwestern corner of Lexington Avenue and 51st Street, with frontage of 112 feet (34 m) on Lexington Avenue and 155 feet (47 m) on 51st Street; it was to be developed with a 46-story skyscraper at 570 Lexington Avenue.

RCA was expected to be one of the major tenants, although the Bartholomew Building Corporation originally refused to confirm this fact. At the time, RCA held a "virtual monopoly on the advertising, marketing, distribution, and selling of communication devices and services" in the United States, though it was barred from making these products and services on its own. RCA had purchased the Victor Talking Machine Company in 1929, becoming known as RCA Victor.

=== Construction ===
Cross & Cross were hired for the project and filed official blueprints. The New York City Department of Buildings issued a new-building permit for the project on December 17, 1929. Detailed plans for 570 Lexington Avenue, by then known as the RCA Victor Building, were publicized in March 1930. As announced, it would be 650.5 feet (198.3 m) tall, consisting of a base of at least 20 stories that tapered into a 30-story tower. (Note: The New York Times claimed a figure of 20 stories for the base, while the New York Herald Tribune and Wall Street Journal gave a figure of 25 stories.) The building would contain 310,000 square feet (29,000 m^{2}) of office space, half to be occupied by RCA. RCA's subsidiaries, NBC and RKO General, would occupy the 9th through 17th floors. A construction contract was immediately let to the A. L. Hartridge Company. The demolition of the existing rowhouses on the site was completed on April 15, 1930. The northern wall of Cathedral High School was left vulnerable as a result of the demolition, so it was reinforced with cinder concrete.

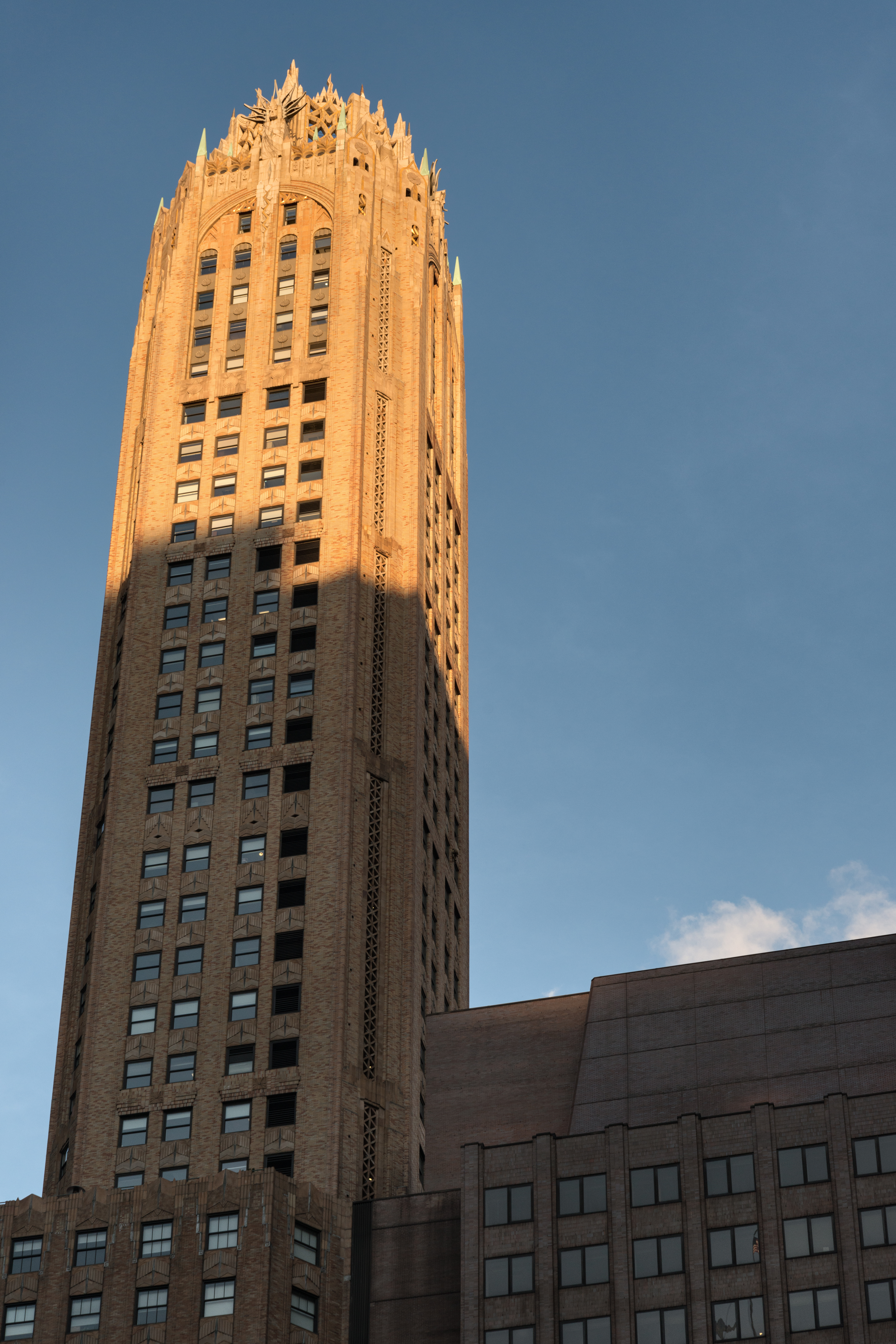
Seen from 50th Street

Simultaneously with the development of the RCA Victor Building, John D. Rockefeller Jr. was planning a large building complex (later Rockefeller Center) three blocks west of the new skyscraper. In December 1929, the Metropolitan Opera had declined an offer to develop a new opera house at Rockefeller's site. Raymond Hood, one of the architects involved in the construction of Rockefeller Center, suggested negotiating with RCA and its subsidiaries to build a mass media entertainment complex there. RCA's founder and GE's chairman, Owen D. Young, was amenable to the proposal. At the time, RCA was seeking more independence from the operations of GE, and three months after David Sarnoff became president of RCA in January 1930, the two companies reached an agreement to separate their operations. As part of that agreement, RCA gave some of its stock and the then-under-construction RCA Victor Building to GE, and the RCA Victor Building became known as the General Electric Building.

Work on the General Electric Building commenced on May 3, 1930. The contract with the steel supplier, the McClintic-Marshall Company, specified a tight construction schedule, which the building's construction appeared to have closely followed. While the facade's decorative elements were originally planned to be made of limestone, this was swapped with terracotta, and limestone was only used between the 34th and 35th floors. The aluminum spandrels planned for the upper floors were also replaced with terracotta finished in aluminum. Initial plans called for a more ornate corner entrance with red-and-black marble, aluminum plant motifs, and inlaid enamel. Construction of floor arches and the steel frame continued through mid-1930, during which RCA continued to negotiate a move to 30 Rockefeller Plaza, which was then under construction. The Bartholomew Building Corporation conveyed the building's leasehold to RCA on January 13, 1931, and property title passed to GE ten days afterward. Construction was completed at the end of 1931.

=== Use ===
==== 1930s to 1950s ====
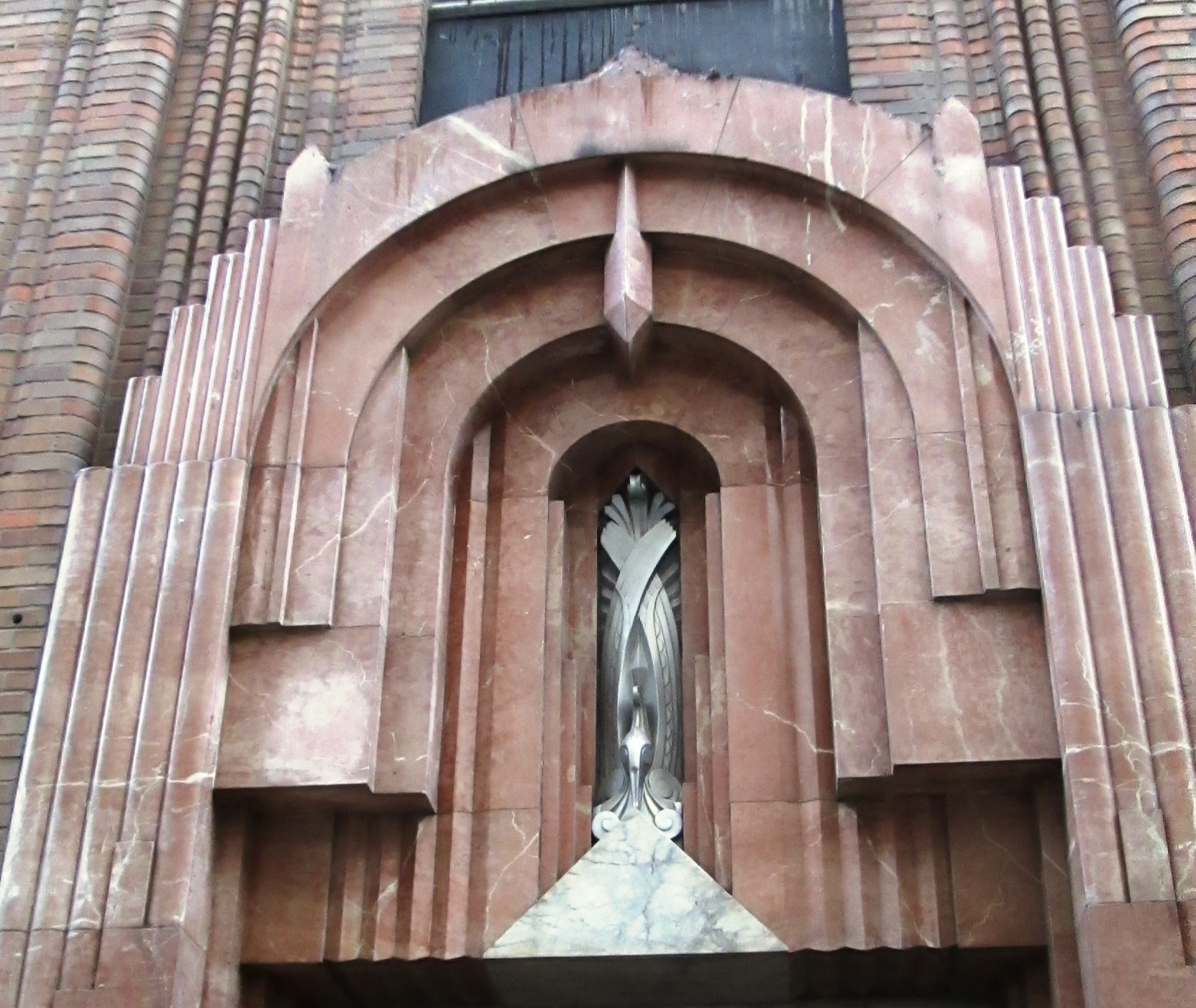
Decoration over the freight entrance on 51st Street

570 Lexington Avenue had opened to tenants by April 24, 1931, when RCA Victor moved to the space. RCA had rented ten floors in January 1931, but later modified the lease to occupy only three floors. Another long-term lessee was Childs Restaurants, who signed a 21-year lease for the ground-level retail space in July 1931. Other large companies took space at the building in its first year, including Seversky Aircraft, the White Sewing Machine Company, the National Civic Federation, and the national headquarters of the Girl Scouts of the USA. By late 1932, RCA and GE finalized an agreement in which RCA would move to Rockefeller Center and GE would take the Lexington Avenue building. RCA moved its offices out of 570 Lexington Avenue in June 1933 with the opening of 30 Rockefeller Plaza.

In July and August 1933, GE moved its headquarters to the building. With this move, along with the opening of the adjacent Lexington Avenue station on the Independent Subway System's Queens Boulevard Line (now the E, F, and <F> trains) the president of the Lexington Avenue Civic Association said that the "transformation" of the surrounding stretch of Lexington Avenue had been completed. Architects Pruitt & Brown filed plans in January 1935 to convert the top two floors into a clubhouse for the Elfun Society, a group of GE executives. By that year, 75% of space in the building was occupied, despite the economic downturn caused by the Great Depression. That July, the dining rooms on the 48th and 49th floors were heavily damaged in a fire, the highest ever fought by the New York City Fire Department at the time. Later in the 1930s, the Citizen Savings Bank opened a bank branch in the building. Other large tenants in the 1940s and 1950s included attorneys Reed, Crane De Give, as well as the Manhattan Savings Bank.

==== 1960s to 1980s ====
An "automatic cafeteria" without a kitchen opened in the General Electric Building in 1961. The building's lights were replaced three years later, and GE moved some of its offices to two other Midtown buildings. By the early 1970s, GE considered constructing a new headquarters in Fairfield, Connecticut. The new headquarters opened in 1974, and the Canadian offices of GE moved to the space that the executive offices had vacated at 570 Lexington Avenue. In subsequent years, much of 570 Lexington Avenue's space subsequently became vacant.

The General Electric Building's original granite storefronts were replaced with aluminum storefronts sometime before 1975. The windows of the other stories were replaced in the mid-1980s, and various features of the exterior were restored. between 1982 and 1988, the building's crown was not illuminated when renovation was nearly complete. Meanwhile, GE had purchased RCA in 1986 and moved its headquarters to 30 Rockefeller Plaza, which was renamed the "GE Building" in 1988. While employees of new GE subsidiary NBC stated that the similar names could cause potential for confusion, a GE spokesperson said that there was precedent for two similarly named buildings in the city, and that in any case, 570 Lexington Avenue was popularly known as "570 Lex". Further confusing the situation, 30 Rockefeller Plaza's former name had been the RCA Building, but 570 Lexington Avenue had also been known by that name during its construction.

==== 1990s to present ====
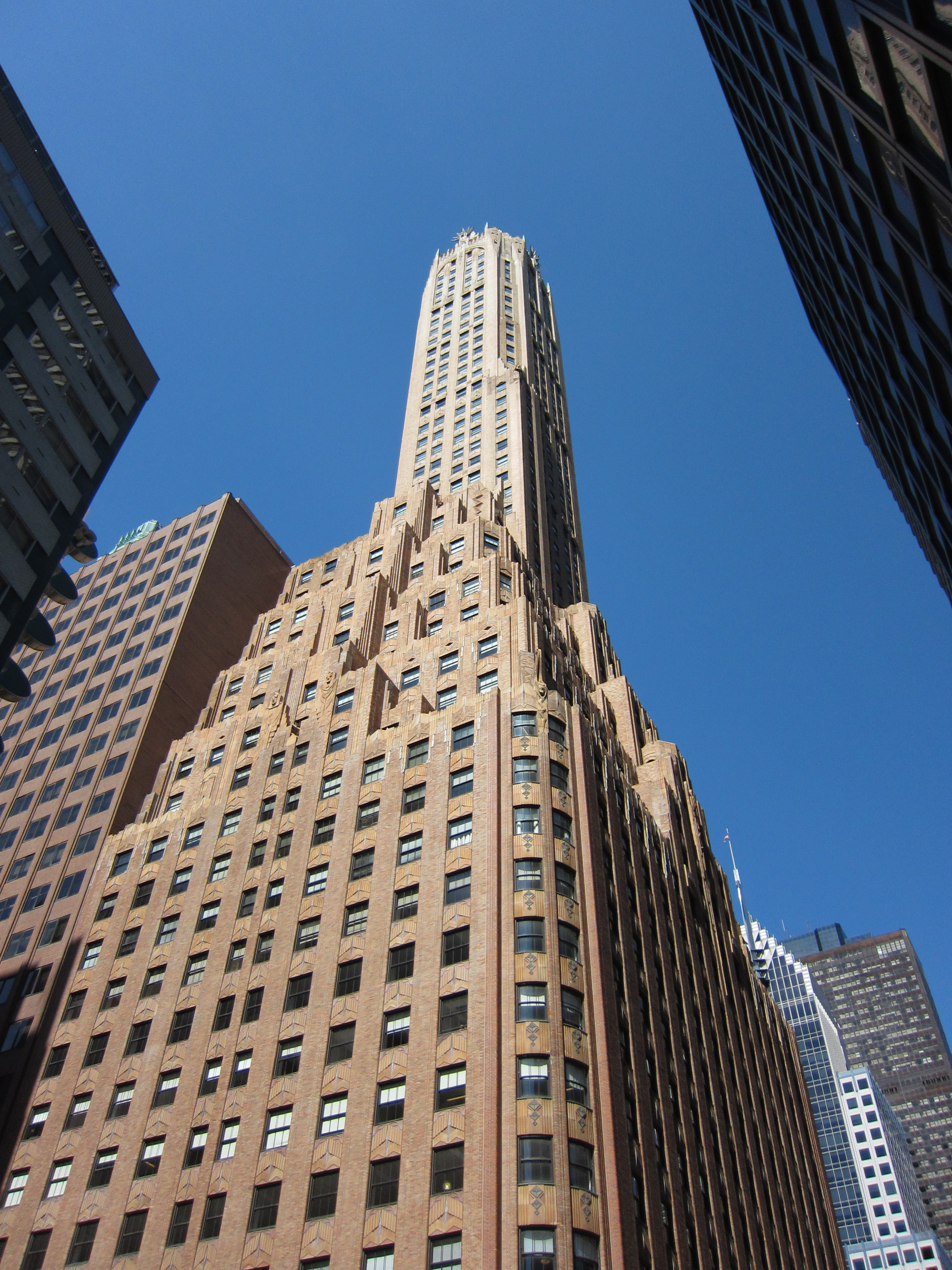
Seen from Lexington and 51st

GE donated 570 Lexington Avenue to Columbia University in 1993, gaining a $40 million tax deduction. The university formed a joint venture with Bernard H. Mendik's Mendik Company and Quantum Realty Partners, and planned a renovation to attract tenants. Between 1993 and 1995, the building was extensively renovated by Ernest de Castro of the WCA Design Group. Several interior systems were refurbished, including the lobby and elevators. The renovation also added some elements, such as chandeliers, that had been planned but not installed in the original design. The exterior was also cleaned and refurbished, and several "miscellaneous modernizations" were removed. The adjacent 51st Street subway entrance was also rebuilt with an Art Deco design. For his company's preservation of the lobby, Mendik received the Preservation Achievement Award in 1996.

By the end of 1995, Mendik and Quantum Realty were leasing out space within 570 Lexington Avenue. At the time, the building's yearly asking prices per square foot were described as being barely market rate, with $30 per square foot ($320/m^{2}) being asked on the lower floors, and $40 per square foot ($430/m^{2}) for the upper floors. Additionally, 570 Lexington Avenue was not located on such a prestigious street, and its design precluded modifications such as dropped ceilings, raised floors, or column removals. Vornado Realty Trust bought Mendik's company in 1997 and increased its ownership stake in 570 Lexington Avenue to a half stake in 1998.

The Feil Organization bought the building in February 2001 for $120 million. By the 2010s, the building's tenants included Cornell University, Cornwall Capital, Asset.tv, Air India, and the Roosevelt Institute. Additionally, in 2018, Urbanspace opened a three-story food hall in the building's base.

== Impact ==
=== Reception ===
At the time of its completion, the General Electric Building was characterized as being in a Gothic style, as the term "Art Deco" had not become popularized yet. A 1931 article in The New York Times described the building as being Gothic in design, as did the retail brochures issued by Cushman & Wakefield, which was originally in charge of leasing out the building's space. George Shepard Chappell, writing in The New Yorker under the pseudonym "T-Square", wrote that the General Electric Building was "Gothic in line and modern in detail". By the late 20th century, the General Electric Building was being described as Art Deco. In the 1978 Macmillian Encyclopedia of Architects, Christopher Gray described the building as "explicitly Art Deco".

Reviews of the design were mostly positive. While Chappell wrote that the General Electric Building was "a little too consciously picturesque", he admired the building's rounded corner. Lewis Pilcher described the building in the 1931 Americana Annual as "superbly conceived [...] with grace and suavity." Arnold Lehman wrote in 1971 that the building was "noteworthy for its highly original decorative treatment", saying that "the sculpted figures in the crown go as unnoticed as the beautifully detailed clock" on the building's northeastern corner. According to the New York City Landmarks Preservation Commission (LPC), the building is a "major example" of Art Deco architecture and its style is "both symbolic and expressive of the building's function". Architecture writer Carter B. Horsley stated that the building's design was an "unofficial campanile to the church" immediately behind.

Later reviews continued to praise the design. Robert A. M. Stern wrote in his 1987 book New York 1930, "Not only was its base a sophisticated piece of urban infill, but its tower was a jewel in New York's skyscraper crown." The AIA Guide to New York City stated that the building's "Art Deco details at both street and sky are both sumptuous and exuberant." According to Peter Pennoyer, the building was distinctive "not only in its powerful and sculptural massing but also in its colorful and adept combination of the Gothic and Art Deco styles". Architecture professor Andrew Dolkart, referring to the General Electric Building and the Waldorf Astoria, said in 2021 that "The dance between those two great Art Deco buildings was something that people interested in the New York skyline noticed right away".

=== Landmark designations ===
The building's exterior was designated a New York City landmark by the LPC in 1985. Although separate "interior landmark" designations existed, the lobby was not designated as a landmark because of opposition from General Electric. 570 Lexington Avenue was added to the National Register of Historic Places on January 28, 2004. Speaking about the landmark designations of the General Electric Building and the neighboring Waldorf Astoria and St. Bartholomew's Church, Frank Mahan of Skidmore, Owings & Merrill said the designations "preserved a unique urban composition with a spiraling upward thrust".

== See also ==
- Architecture of New York City
  - Art Deco architecture of New York City
- List of New York City Designated Landmarks in Manhattan from 14th to 59th Streets
- National Register of Historic Places listings in Manhattan from 14th to 59th Streets
