= Syrian Americans in New York City =

Ethnic group

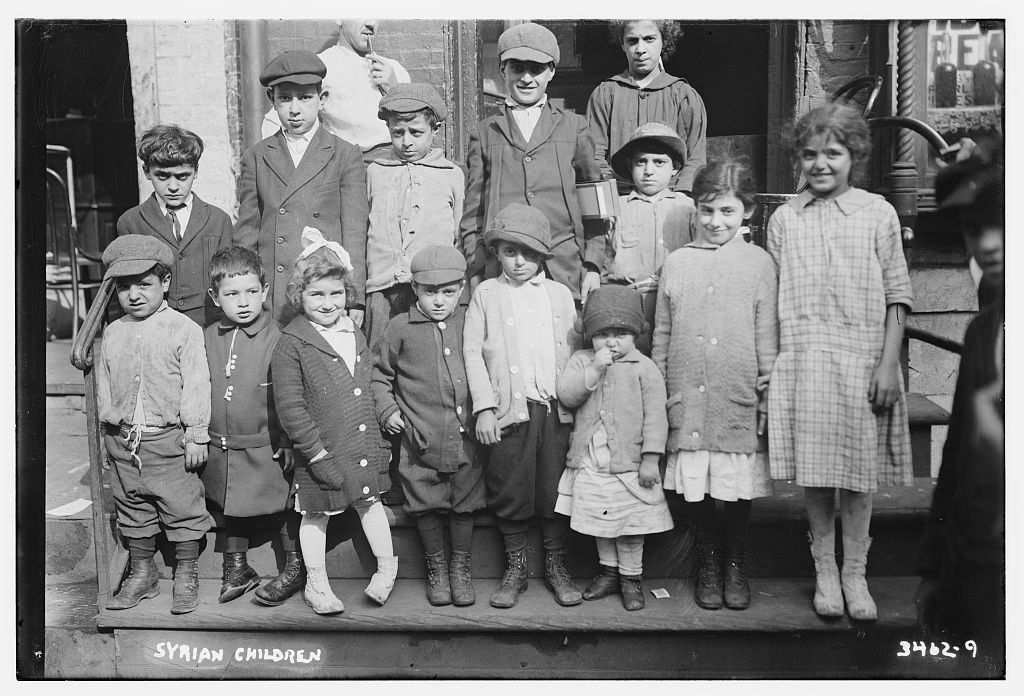
Syrian immigrant children (ca. 1910-15)

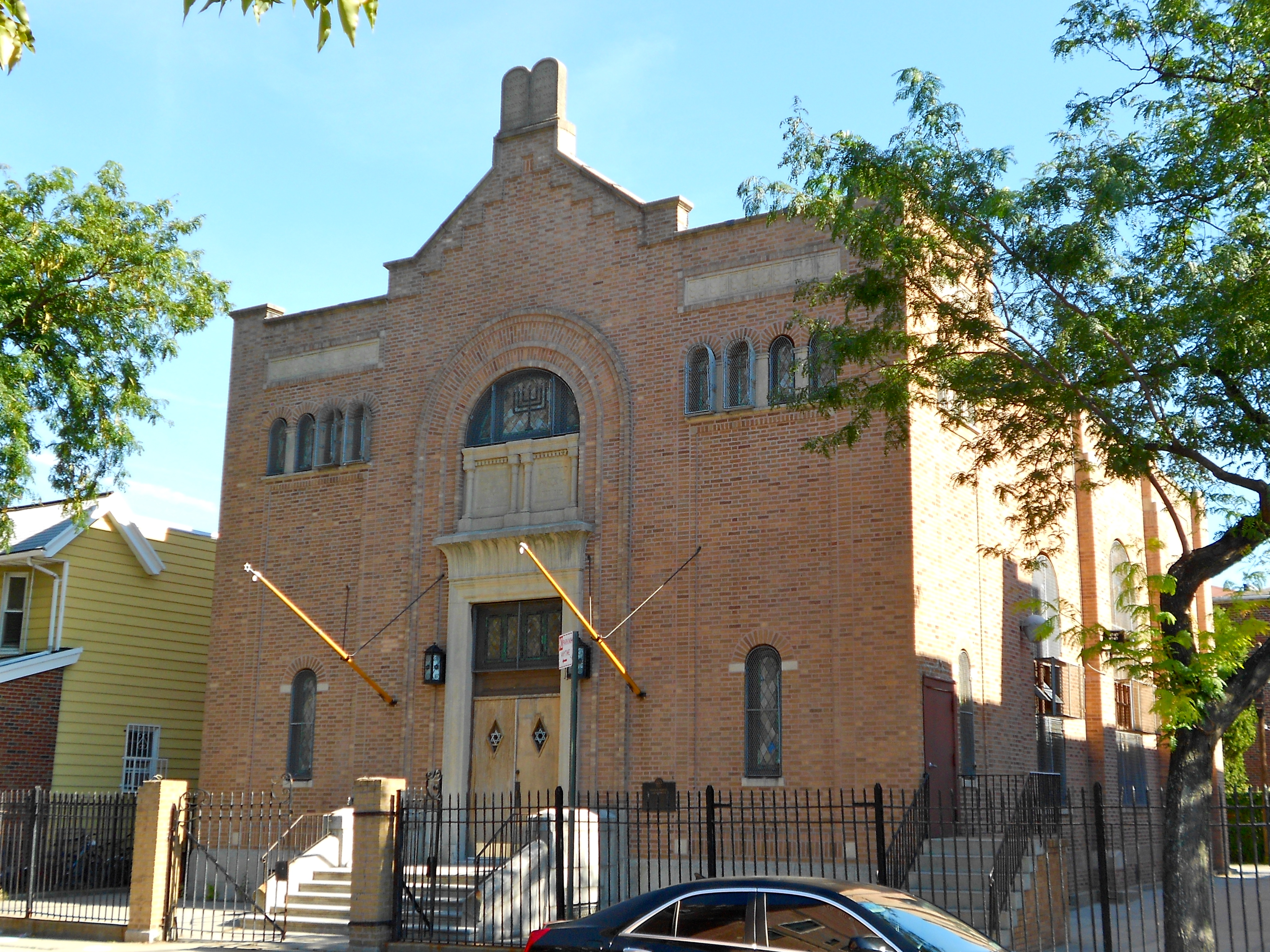
Magen David Synagogue, an historic Sephardi Syrian-Jewish synagogue in Brooklyn, September 2013.

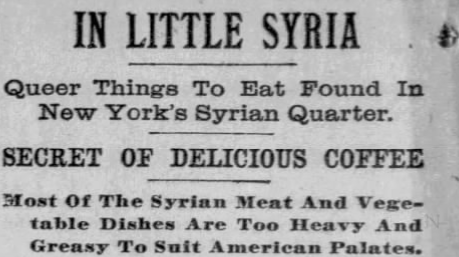
December 26, 1905 article in The Baltimore Sun about Little Syria.

The city of New York City includes a large Syrian population. New York City's Syrian community was historically centered in Manhattan's Little Syria, but is now centered in Brooklyn. Historically, Syrians in New York City were predominantly Christian. In the modern era, the city is home to the world's largest Syrian-Jewish community outside of Israel. 75,000 Syrian Jews live in New York City, mostly in Brooklyn. New York City is also home to a smaller community of Syrian Muslims who have lived in the city for over a century, most of whom have immigrated since the 1960s.

== History ==
Between the 1870s and the 1930s, thousands of Syrians immigrated to New York City. They immigrated from the region of Ottoman Greater Syria, now known as the Levant. Greater Syria includes what is now Syria, Lebanon, Israel, and Palestine. Immigrants from Ottoman Syria were known as "Syrians", although after the independence of Lebanon in the 1920s, some of the Syrians began to identify as Lebanese. While Syrians/Syro-Lebanese immigrants settled across the United States, New York City became the central hub of the Syrian diaspora in America. The heart of New York City's "Syrian Colony" was Little Syria in downtown Manhattan. By the early 1900s, Syrians from Little Syria began to settle in Brooklyn. Syrian Christians belonged to multiple denominations, including the Maronite Church, the Greek Orthodox Church of Antioch, and the Melkite Greek Catholic Church. Prior to the 1960s, Syrian Muslims were a small and largely invisible population compared to the Arab Christian population. Many of the Syrian Muslims emigrated from the region of Palestine. There are educational and economic divides among the Syrian population, with Syrian Christians and Syrian Jews having higher levels of educational and economic achievement compared to the Syrian Muslim community, which is more likely to experience poverty and educational barriers.

When Syrian Jews first began to arrive in New York City during the late 1800s and early 1900s, Eastern European Ashkenazi Jews on the Lower East Side sometimes disdained their Syrian co-coreligionists as Arabische Yidden, Arab Jews. Some Ashkenazim doubted whether Sephardi/Mizrahi Jews from the Middle East were Jewish at all. In response, some Syrian Jews who were deeply proud of their ancient Jewish heritage, derogatorily dubbed Ashkenazi Jews as "J-Dubs", a reference to the first and third letters of the English word "Jew".

== Demographics ==
By 1910, the Syrian population of Brooklyn had surpassed the population in Manhattan. By 1930, Brooklyn was home to 10,000 Syrian-Americans. The South Ferry neighborhood was the center of Syrian Brooklyn.

== Notable Syrian Americans in New York City ==
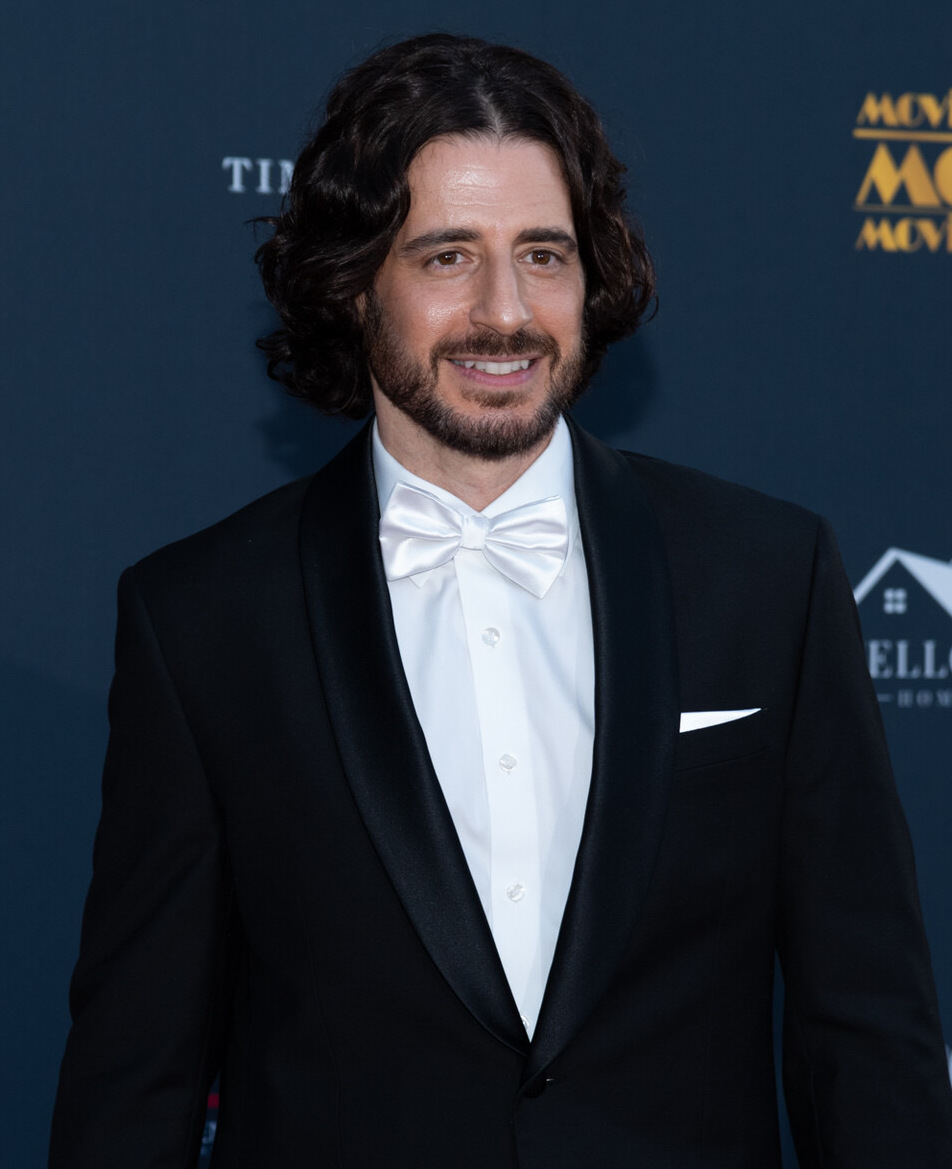
Jonathan Roumie, actor.

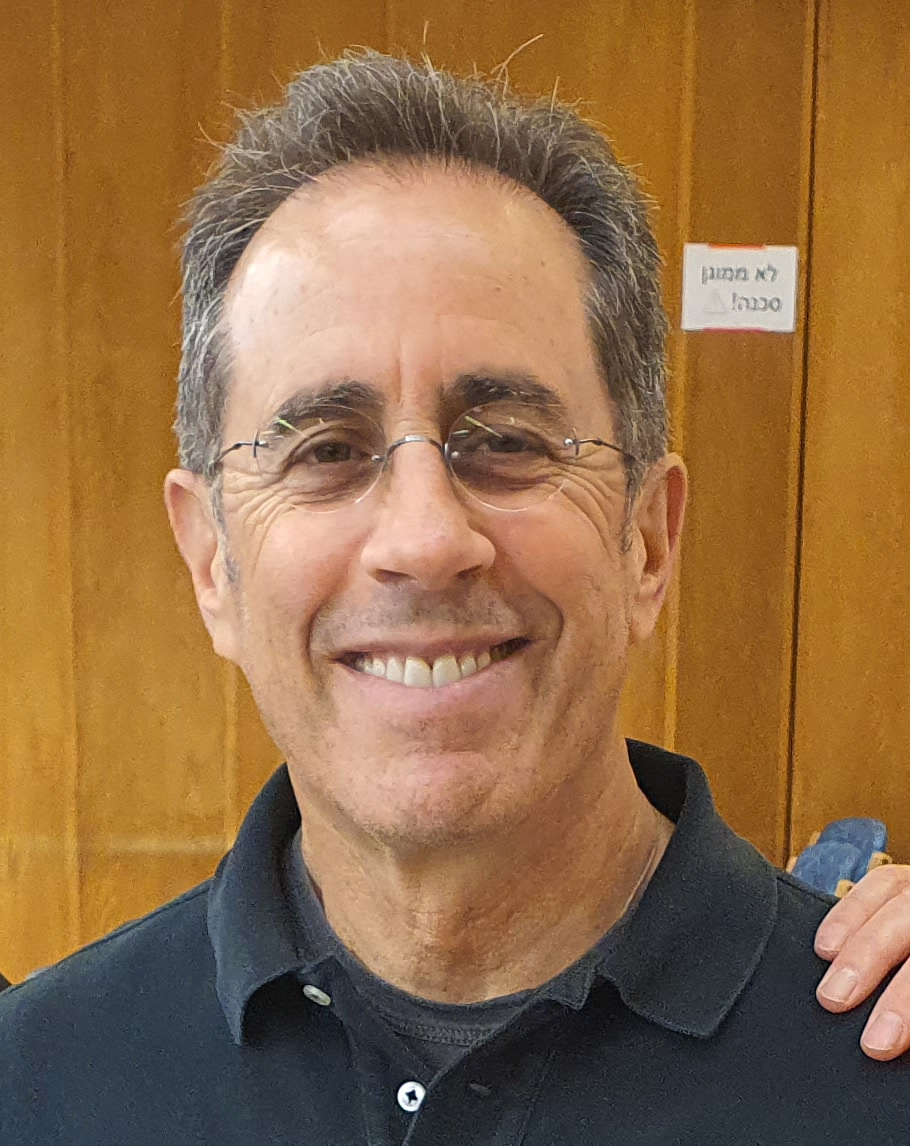
Jerry Seinfeld, comedian.

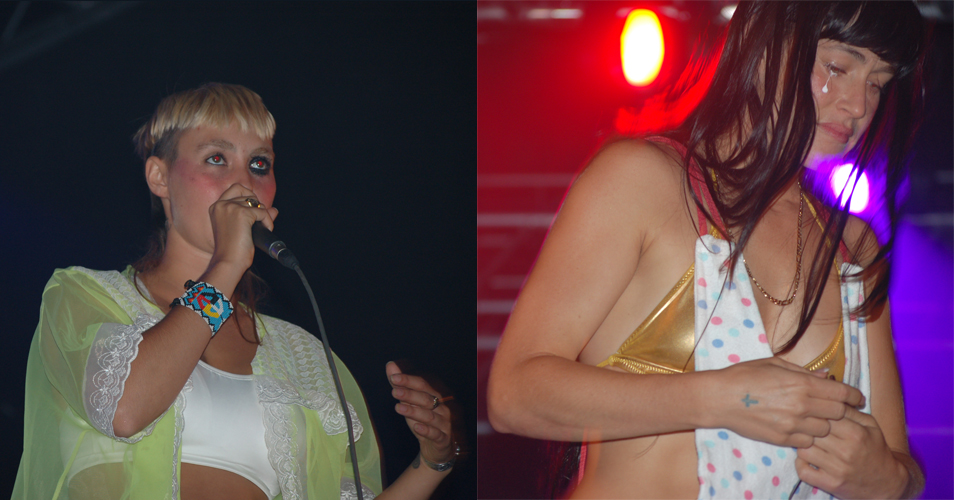
Sierra and Bianca Casady, musicians.

- Eddie Antar, co-founder of Crazy Eddie electronics retail company
- Joseph Cayre, billionaire businessman, co-founder of Salsoul Records
- Stanley Chera, billionaire real estate developer
- CocoRosie (Bianca and Sierra Casady), musical group
- Sonny Gindi, businessman and co-founder of Century 21 department store
- Frank Harary, mathematician, widely recognized as one of the fathers of modern graph theory
- Robert Malley, lawyer and political scientist who was the lead negotiator on the 2015 Iran nuclear deal
- Jerrier A. Haddad, co-developer of IBM's first commercial scientific computer, and the world's first programmable electronic calculator
- Dan Hedaya, actor
- Jonathan Roumie, actor, known for his role as evangelist Lonnie Frisbee in the 2023 film Jesus Revolution and as Jesus in The Chosen
- Isaac Mizrahi, fashion designer and actor
- Helly Nahmad, art dealer and collector
- Joseph Nakash, Israeli-American billionaire businessman, founder of Jordache
- Douglas Jemal, real estate developer
- Raphael of Brooklyn, the first Orthodox Christian bishop consecrated on American soil
- Marie-Hélène de Rothschild, French socialite
- Boris Saad, professional race driver
- Jerry Seinfeld, stand-up comedian, actor, writer, and producer
- Amanda Setton, actress
- Lori Ann Setton, bioengineer and scientist, now chair of the Department of Biomedical Engineering at Washington University
- Charlie Shrem, entrepreneur and bitcoin advocate
- Joseph Sitt, real estate investor, founder of Ashley Stewart, and Thor Equities
- Jeff Sutton, billionaire real estate developer
- Vic Tayback, actor
- Rama Duwaji, animator, illustrator and ceramist, wife of elected New York City mayor Zohran Mamdani

== See also ==
- Little Syria, Manhattan
