= Eli Gindi =

American real estate developer

- Occupation: Real estate developer

Eli Gindi is an American real estate developer, investor, and founding partner of Gindi Capital, a New York City-based family-owned real estate investment and development firm.

== Early life and family background ==
Eli Gindi belongs to the third generation of the Gindi family, a Syrian Jewish (Sephardic) family that immigrated to the United States. His family legacy includes co-founding the Century 21 department store chain in 1961, starting as an off-price luxury fashion retailer in lower Manhattan and expanding to 13 locations before filing for bankruptcy in 2020 amid the COVID-19 pandemic. The family shifted focus to real estate, building a portfolio in retail, multifamily, and mixed-use properties.

== Career ==
Gindi co-founded Gindi Capital with his brother Jeffrey Gindi, where he serves as a founding partner alongside other family members and partners like Jack Braha, Ralph Gindi, and Sol Gindi. The firm specializes in identifying and revitalizing underutilized retail, multifamily, and mixed-use spaces in major U.S. markets, with additional activity in Canada and the United Kingdom.

Key projects and transactions include:

- The BLVD development on the Las Vegas Strip—a 400,000-square-foot, three-level retail and dining complex with 700 feet of frontage, developed in partnership with the Cherng Family Trust (co-founders of Panda Express). Acquired sites like the former Hawaiian Marketplace in 2019 for $172 million, the project targets mid-tier flagship retailers (e.g., Adidas, H&M, Puma, JD Sports, Pandora) and eateries, including a large In-N-Out Burger location.
- A $335 million construction financing deal for a mixed-use project at Gramercy Park (in partnership with Legion Investment Group), involving approximately 60 residential units.
- Sales of family-held properties, including portions of the original Century 21 Bay Ridge site in Brooklyn in 2025.
- A 2012 portfolio sale across Manhattan, Brooklyn, and Queens for $164 million.
- In 2013, he purchased (along with Joseph Nakash) the Versace Mansion in Miami Beach outbidding Donald Trump.
- Gindi along with Stanley Chera, Joseph Jemal, and Albert Laboz is leading the redevelopment of the Fulton Mall in downtown Brooklyn.

Gindi has also been associated with Gindi Equities, a multifamily-focused investment platform anchored by the family, targeting properties in the Southeast and Midwest.

== Politics ==
During Donald Trump's second term as US president, private jets owned by shell companies connected to Gindi and Joseph Nakash were used for at least 8 flights deporting migrants from the United States, including deportations to third countries where those migrants had no ties, and where they were held in indefinite detention.

== Personal life ==
Gindi resides in Brooklyn, New York. In November 2025, he sold his Gravesend mansion for $32 million in an off-market deal to Victor Hakim (founder and CEO of Choice Home Warranty). The transaction set a record as the most expensive single-family home sale in Brooklyn history, surpassing the prior record of $25.5 million (set in 2020 for a home in Brooklyn Heights).
