= Gindi =

Gindi may refer to:

- Eli Gindi, real estate developer
- Joginder Singh (field hockey) (1939–2002), Indian hockey player nicknamed Gindi
- Raymond Gindi, CEO of Century 21
- Sonny Gindi (1924–2012), co-founder of the department store Century 21

== See also ==
- Nadia Al-Gindi (born 1946), Egyptian actress and producer
- Gindie, Queensland, Australia
- Gindis
