= Gindl =

Gindl is a Hungarian surname. Notable people with the surname include:

- Caleb Gindl (born 1988), American baseball player and coach
- László Gindl (fl. 1980s), Hungarian sprint canoer

== See also ==
- Gindi
