= Flatbush Avenue =

Avenue in Brooklyn, New York

- Flatbush Avenue Extension
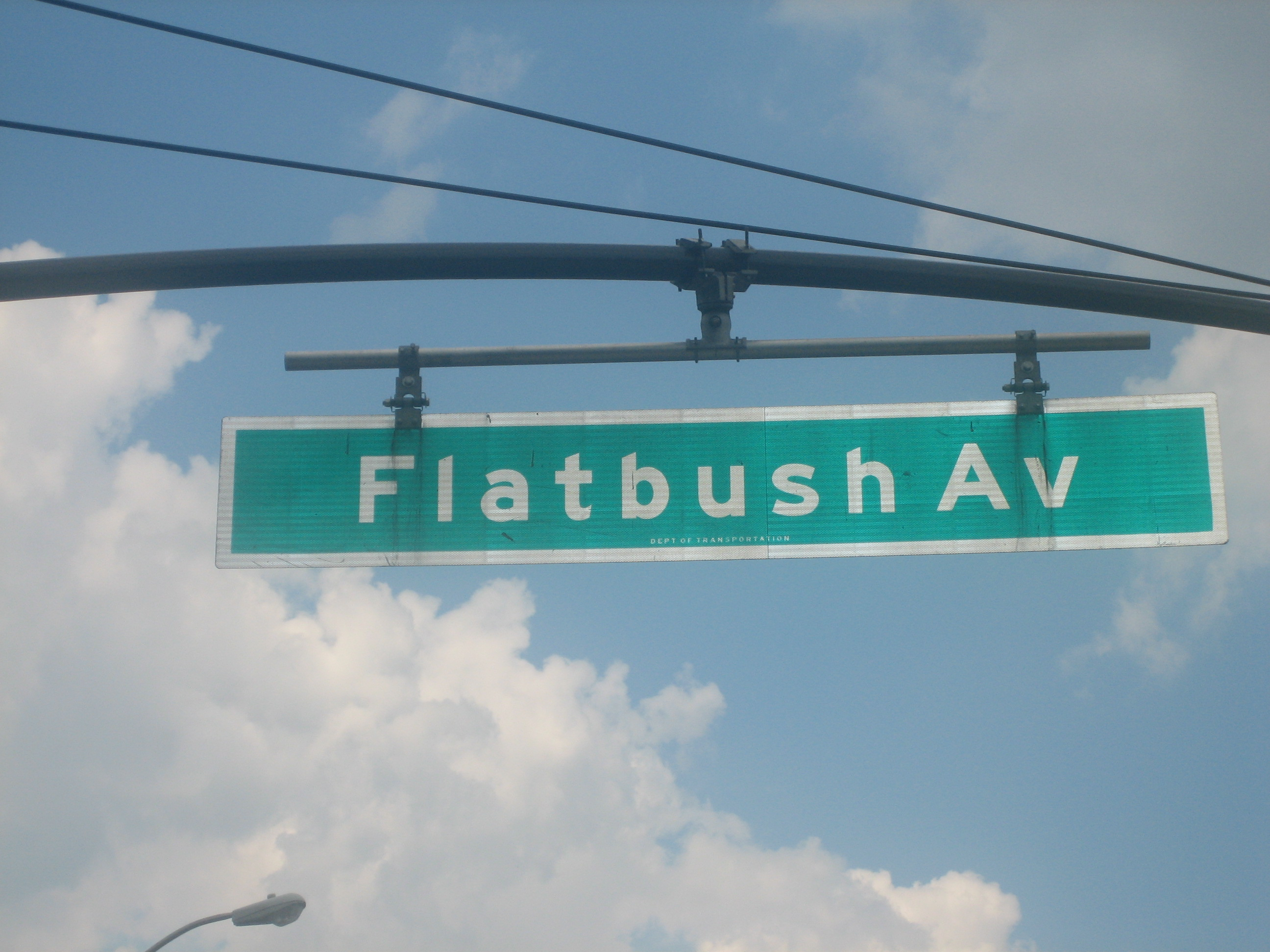
- Flatbush Avenue sign near Brooklyn Botanic Garden
- Interactive map of Flatbush Avenue
- Namesake: Flatbush (Dutch)
- Owner: City of New York
- Maintained by: NYCDOT
- Length: 9.9 mi (15.9 km)
- Location: Brooklyn, New York City
- South end: Marine Parkway Bridge at Floyd Bennett Field
- Major junctions: Belt Parkway at Floyd Bennett Field; NY 27 in Flatbush
- North end: I-278 / Manhattan Bridge in Downtown Brooklyn

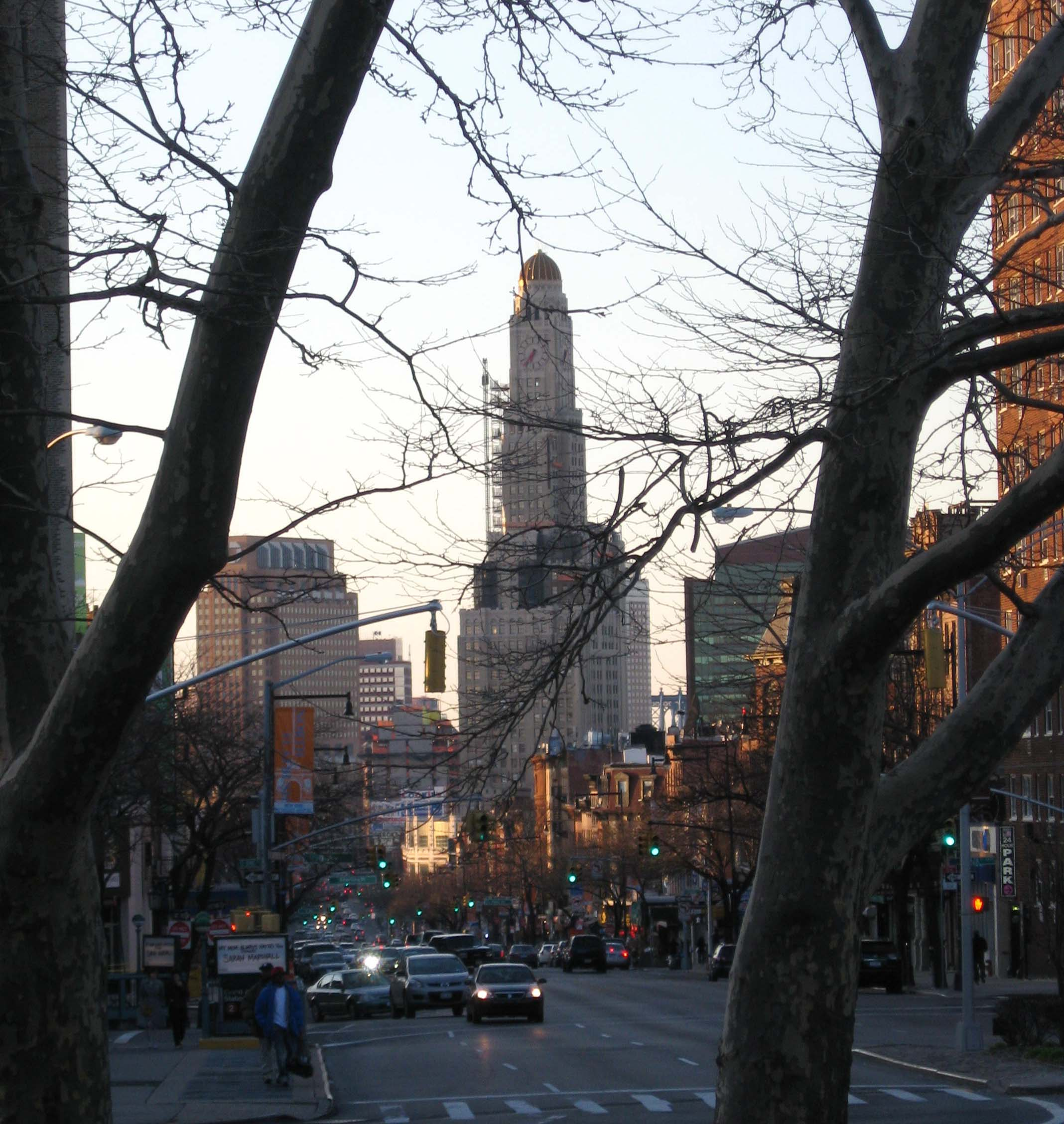
Looking north from Grand Army Plaza towards the Williamsburgh Savings Bank Tower

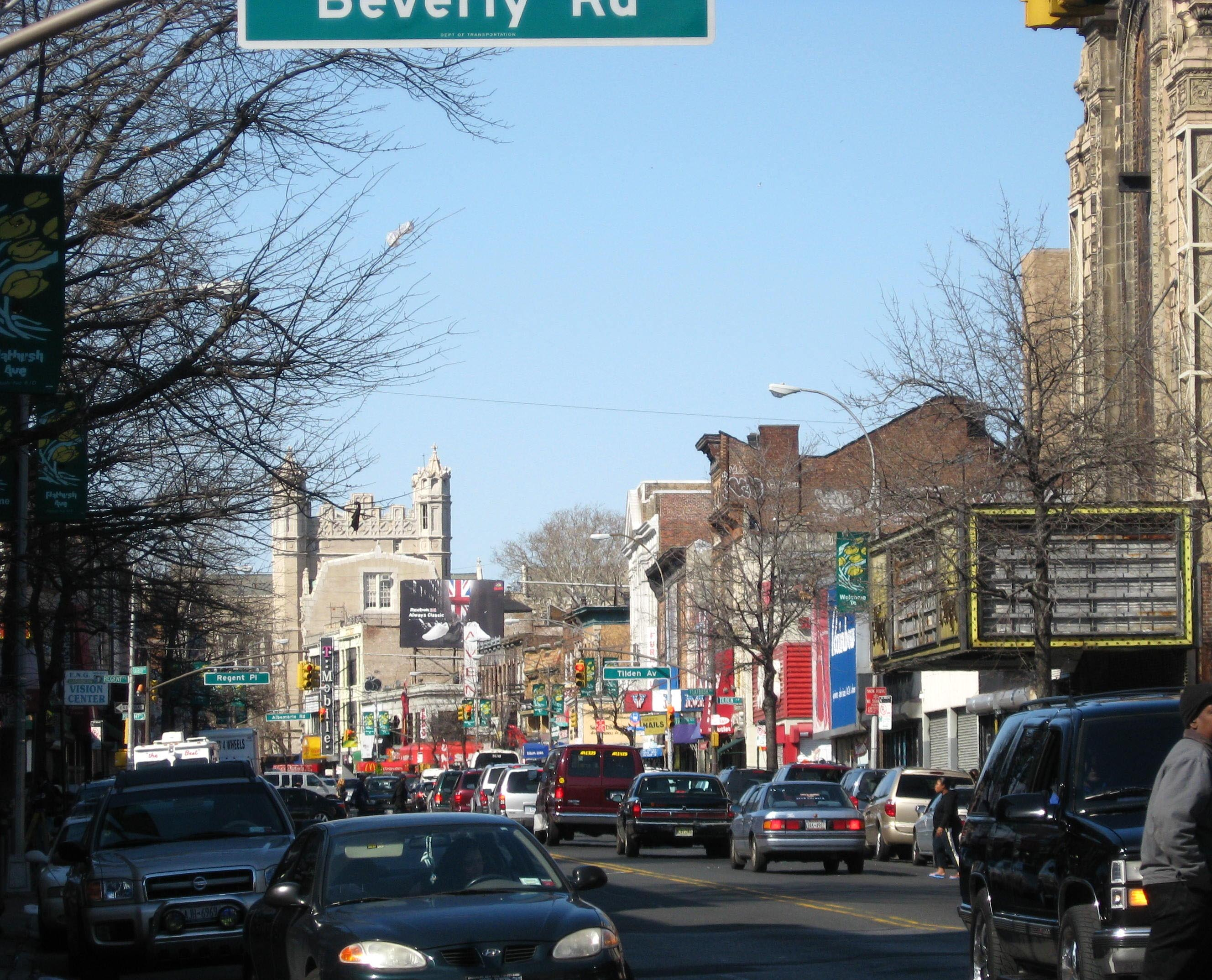
Beverly Road shopping area, looking north past Kings Theatre towards Erasmus Hall

Flatbush Avenue is a major avenue in the New York City borough of Brooklyn. It runs from the Manhattan Bridge south-southeastward to Jamaica Bay, where it joins the Marine Parkway–Gil Hodges Memorial Bridge, which connects Brooklyn to the Rockaway Peninsula in Queens. The north end was extended from Fulton Street to the Manhattan Bridge as "Flatbush Avenue Extension".

Flatbush Avenue, including the extension, is 9.9 miles (15.9 km) long. The avenue is a four-lane street throughout the majority of its run. North of Atlantic Avenue and south of Utica Avenue, it is a six-lane-wide median-divided street.

== Effect on street grid ==
The diagonal path of Flatbush Avenue creates a unique street pattern in every neighborhood it touches. It is the central artery of the borough, carrying traffic to and from Manhattan past landmarks such as MetroTech Center, City Point, the Fulton Mall, Junior's, Long Island University Brooklyn, the Brooklyn Academy of Music, the Long Island Rail Road's Atlantic Terminal, the Barclays Center, Grand Army Plaza, the Brooklyn Public Library, the Brooklyn Botanic Garden, Prospect Park, Erasmus Hall High School, Kings Theatre, Brooklyn College, Kings Plaza, and Floyd Bennett Field.

Flatbush Avenue is the border of Prospect Heights/Park Slope and many other neighborhoods. Other main Brooklyn thoroughfares start at Flatbush Avenue, including Ocean Avenue and Empire Boulevard (both at Willink Plaza), Linden Boulevard, Eastern Parkway, and Utica Avenue.

== History ==
Prior to European settlement, several Native American trails crossed Brooklyn. These were later widened into "ferry roads" by 17th-century Dutch settlers, since they were used to provide transport to the waterfront. One was the Flatbush Road, running roughly north–south to the east of the path of present-day Flatbush Avenue. The road ran roughly along what is now the eastern edge of Prospect Park and taking advantage of a low point in the Heights of Guan that form the spine of Long Island. A monument beside the former Flatbush Road, now inside the park, commemorates an attempt to block the road at Battle Pass during the Battle of Long Island. For much of the 19th century, it had a plank road run by a turnpike company. Historic homes line the neighborhoods around the avenue, which in the late 1920s was straightened to its current form. Streets such as Amersfort Place that are remnants of old parts of the avenue remain in the city grid as an echo of the past.

== Transportation ==
Flatbush Avenue is served by the following MTA Regional Bus Operations routes:

- The B41 serves the majority of the avenue, between Livingston Street and either Avenue V, where Kings Plaza is located, or Avenue N, to serve Bergen Beach.
- The Q35 runs south of Avenue I (Brooklyn College), or Avenue H (Rockaway Park, Queens).
- From Kings Plaza heading north, where all three terminate, the B46 and B46 SBS go to Utica Avenue, the B2 goes to Avenue S, and B9 buses that serve the full route go to Avenue L.
- The B82 local runs on the avenue between Kings Highway and Flatlands Avenue. The B82 SBS does not serve any portion.
- Northbound B44 SBS buses run from Nostrand Avenue to Rogers Avenue. The B44 local does not serve any portion.
- When serving the full route, the B103 runs on two portions of Flatbush. One is between Avenue H and either terminates at Nostrand Avenue (Brooklyn College), or continues to Cortelyou Road (Downtown Brooklyn), where it's accompanied by the BM2 express. The other portion is between Livingston Street and either Lafayette Avenue (Downtown Brooklyn), or 4th Avenue (Canarsie).
- The B11 runs between Glenwood Road and Brooklyn College, where all buses terminate. The B6 uses the avenue to continue along Glenwood, past East 29th Street.
- Prospect Park-bound B16 buses run from Ocean Avenue to Lincoln Road.
- From 7th Avenue, the B67 heads north to Livingston Street, while the B69 heads south to Plaza Street East.
- The B63 runs between 5th and Atlantic Avenues, west from Flatbush. The B45 runs between Livingston Street and Atlantic, east from Flatbush.
- Ridgewood-bound B54 buses run on the Extension part of the avenue from Tillary Street to Myrtle Avenue.

A dedicated bus lane corridor on Flatbush Avenue was proposed in 2022; at the time, the B41 route traveled at an average speed of 6.5 miles per hour (10.5 km/h). Designs for the bus lanes were revealed in 2024, and the New York City Department of Transportation announced the next year that center-running bus lanes, with pedestrian islands, would be built on the northern part of the avenue from Livingston Street to Grand Army Plaza. The lanes were installed starting in late 2025 and were completed in November 2026.

Flatbush Avenue is served by the following New York City Subway stations:

- The IRT Nostrand Avenue Line (2 and 5 trains) has a southern terminus at the Flatbush Avenue–Brooklyn College station.
- The BMT Brighton Line (B and Q trains) and IRT Eastern Parkway Line (2, 3, 4, and 5 trains) run under the avenue between Prospect Park and DeKalb Avenue, and Grand Army Plaza and Nevins Street, respectively.

== See also ==
- Smith & Gray Company Building
