= Downeast Airlines =

- Commenced operations: 1960; 65 years ago
- Ceased operations: June 1, 2007; 17 years ago
- Operating bases: Knox County Regional Airport, Maine, USA
- Headquarters: Rockland, Maine, United States
- Key people: Robert Stenger

Downeast Airlines was a commuter airline based in Rockland, Maine, from 1960 to June 1, 2007, when it was acquired by Maine Atlantic Aviation, an arm of the Jordache Enterprises conglomerate. While the airline was closed, Downeast Air remains a fixed-base operator at its former home airfield.

== History ==
In 1960, Robert Stenger established the company based at the Knox County Regional Airport in Rockland, Maine. The fixed base operator started as Mid-Coast Airways and later changed its name to Downeast Airlines which was inspired by the area of Maine from around Bar Harbor northeast up the coast to the Canada–US border that has been known for at least two centuries as "Downeast Maine".

After leaving the US Army as a sergeant in the mid-1950s and using his Veterans Administration educational benefits to pay for flight lessons, Stenger received his commercial pilot's license and later started the company. In 1968, after Northeast Airlines began its merger with Delta Air Lines, the new organization applied to the Civil Aeronautics Board to discontinue service on the Boston to Rockland route. The Northeast-Delta's executives began searching for a company to sponsor as a replacement carrier. Stenger's operation, which already had an air-taxi certificate from the FAA under Part 135 of the Federal Air Regulations, applied for the route as a scheduled air-taxi carrier and subsequently qualified as a Part 135 commuter airline.

In 1980, Stenger sold the Boston to Rockland route to Bar Harbor Airlines, but continued the air-taxi service.

The business grew into having a terminal area, separate office, crew lounge, rental-car counter and hangar, with an aviation fuel farm and two additional hangars. It remained family owned and operated through June 1, 2007 when it was acquired by Rockland Airport Partners (RAP), LLC (a division of Jordache Enterprises, doing business as Maine Atlantic Aviation (MAA).

== Flight 46 accident ==
In 1978, Downeast purchased a de Havilland Canada DHC-6-200 Twin Otter (N68DE) STOL capable turboprop from Air Illinois. Up until that time, Downeast had only operated Piper Aztec and Piper Navajo light twins and one Cessna 182 single engine.

On May 30, 1979, Downeast Airlines Flight 46 that originated in Boston crashed into a heavily wooded area about 1.2 miles south-southwest of the Knox county Regional Airport in Rockland. Of the 16 passengers and two crewmembers aboard, only one passenger survived the accident. The aircraft was destroyed. The sole survivor broke one of his legs and arms.

Up until this time, the National Transportation Safety Board (NTSB) would review airline crashes with their "Go Team" for a short time performing analysis and interviews and then write their report; but while the team was gathering information about the accident, the management practices at the company were questioned. Subsequently, this was the first time that the NTSB took someone off of the team after the normal review period and had them stay behind and work full-time for the first human-performance investigation rather than just a human-factor investigation.

According to the NTSB Aircraft Accident Report:

... the probable cause of the accident was the failure of the flightcrew to arrest the aircraft's descent at the minimum descent altitude for the nonprecision approach, without the runway environment in sight, for unknown reasons. Although the Safety Board was unable to determine conclusively the reason(s) for the flightcrew's deviation from standard instrument approach procedures, it is believed that inordinate management pressures, the first officer's marginal instrument proficiency, the captain's inadequate supervision of the flight, inadequate crew training and procedures, and the captain's chronic fatigue were all factors in the accident.

Nearly 20 years later, the accident was still being actively and publicly discussed. In 1997, the chairman of the NTSB included the following in a speech that covered corporate culture and transportation safety:

Let me give you another example. Years ago our assessment of corporate culture focused primarily on whether management actively discouraged their operators -- in aviation, that would be pilots -- from following the established company and government rules and procedures. Yet, considering how much we have learned about corporate culture, it is difficult to accept the fact that accidents occurred because some companies actually encouraged rule breaking. For example, on May 30, 1979, a DeHavilland Twin Otter, operated by Downeast Airlines, a regularly scheduled commuter flight from Boston, crashed near Rockland, Maine, while the pilot was attempting to land in restricted visual conditions. Both pilots and all but one of the 16 passengers were killed in the accident.

The investigation found that the visibility was so poor that the pilot could not have been able to see the airport at the point, known as the decision height, at which he was required to abandon the approach if he could not see the airport. Why then did he attempt to land anyway, given the known hazards and prohibitions against such attempts? Well, further investigation found a corporate culture in place at that airline that not only did not enhance safety but actively discouraged it. The owner of the airline, who as president directed its day to day operations, conveyed to the captain and to all pilots his expectations that they would cut corners in the interest of saving money. In fact, he criticized and threatened them when they did not.

In addition, we learned that the captain believed that he had no real authority to stand up to the company president and, moreover, feared for his job if he did not satisfy the president's wishes. Although this accident was certainly not the first one in which an abusive or threatening management style adversely affected flight safety, it was the first we could recall in which the Safety Board explicitly addressed the role of management in the cause of an accident. The lessons of this accident were unmistakable: a management climate that pressures pilots to ignore flight rules and safe operating practices, and threatens pilots if they do not conform to these practices, adversely affects the safety of the operation.

== See also ==
- List of defunct airlines of the United States
