= Albert Laboz =

American landlord

- Citizenship: American
- Occupation: Real Estate Developer
- Known for: founder of United American Land
- Spouse: Renee Laboz
- Website: unitedamericanland.com

Albert "Al" Laboz is a New York real estate developer, landlord, and the founder of United American Land.

== Biography ==
Laboz was born to a Syrian Jewish family, the son of real estate investor Jack Laboz. He has two brothers: Jody and Jason. He and his brothers founded Soho based United American Land (UAL). UAL focuses on restoring, improving, and reinventing historic buildings in Tribeca, Soho, the Flatiron District and downtown Brooklyn, into luxury residences; and transforming overlooked commercial property for upgraded retail use.

UAL was also selected by the New York City Economic Development Corporation to own and develop the Brooklyn Municipal Building into prime retail space. Laboz (along with Stanley Chera, Joseph Jemal, and Eli Gindi) is leading the redevelopment of the Fulton Mall in downtown Brooklyn where Laboz is developing a new H&M store above a transit hub. Laboz's plan is to turn the Fulton Mall into the new 34th Street.

Although Laboz is a preservationist, he’s an advocate for streamlining the bureaucracy of the Landmarks Preservation Commission. Laboz serves as chairman of the Fulton Mall Improvement Association; and is a member of the executive committee of the Downtown Brooklyn Partnership and the MetroTech Business Improvement District. He is also a trustee of the Yeshiva of Flatbush. He is a supporter of Chai Lifeline, a charity dedicated to improving the lives of children stricken with genetic disorders and cancer. He is a director of the Orthodox Union. He is the president of his synagogue Ohel David and Shlomo in Brooklyn. He is married to Renee Laboz and lives in Brooklyn and summers in Deal, New Jersey.
