= Sasson Jeans =

American jeans brand

Sasson Jeans was an American apparel brand. The brand was founded by Maurice Sasson and Paul Guez in 1976.

== History ==
The brand was created in 1976. At one point, it had a heavy advertisement campaign that included sponsoring boxers such as World Boxing Council Heavyweight world champion Larry Holmes and that same entity's world Featherweight champion Juan Laporte (who was forced out of a promotional contract with Guez by boxing promoter Don King).

Eddie Mustafa Muhammad was another well known, world champion boxer who was sponsored by Sasson Jeans; he fought on national television in the United States with shorts advertising the brand.

== Demise ==
Maurice Sasson left Sasson Jeans in 1979. In 1983, Jordache, a rival apparel company, bought out the Maurice Sasson brand name and appointed Maurice Sasson as president and chief designer of Jordache's new brand, Bronco Jeans. Maurice Sasson left Sasson Jeans during an era in which Sasson Jeans also faced a lawsuit in court from the Vidal Sassoon hair products brand, in which Vidal Sassoon alleged that Sasson Inc. had appropriated their name. That lawsuit was settled after Sasson Inc. agreed not to pronounce the last syllable of their name on their television ads as if it sounded like "soon", thus minimizing public confusion about both brands.

Eventually, in 1986, Sasson Inc., owners of the Sasson Jeans brand, declared bankruptcy, with assets of $11.5 million dollars versus debts of $7.5 million.
