= Nevins Street station =

New York City Subway station in Brooklyn

Nevins Street
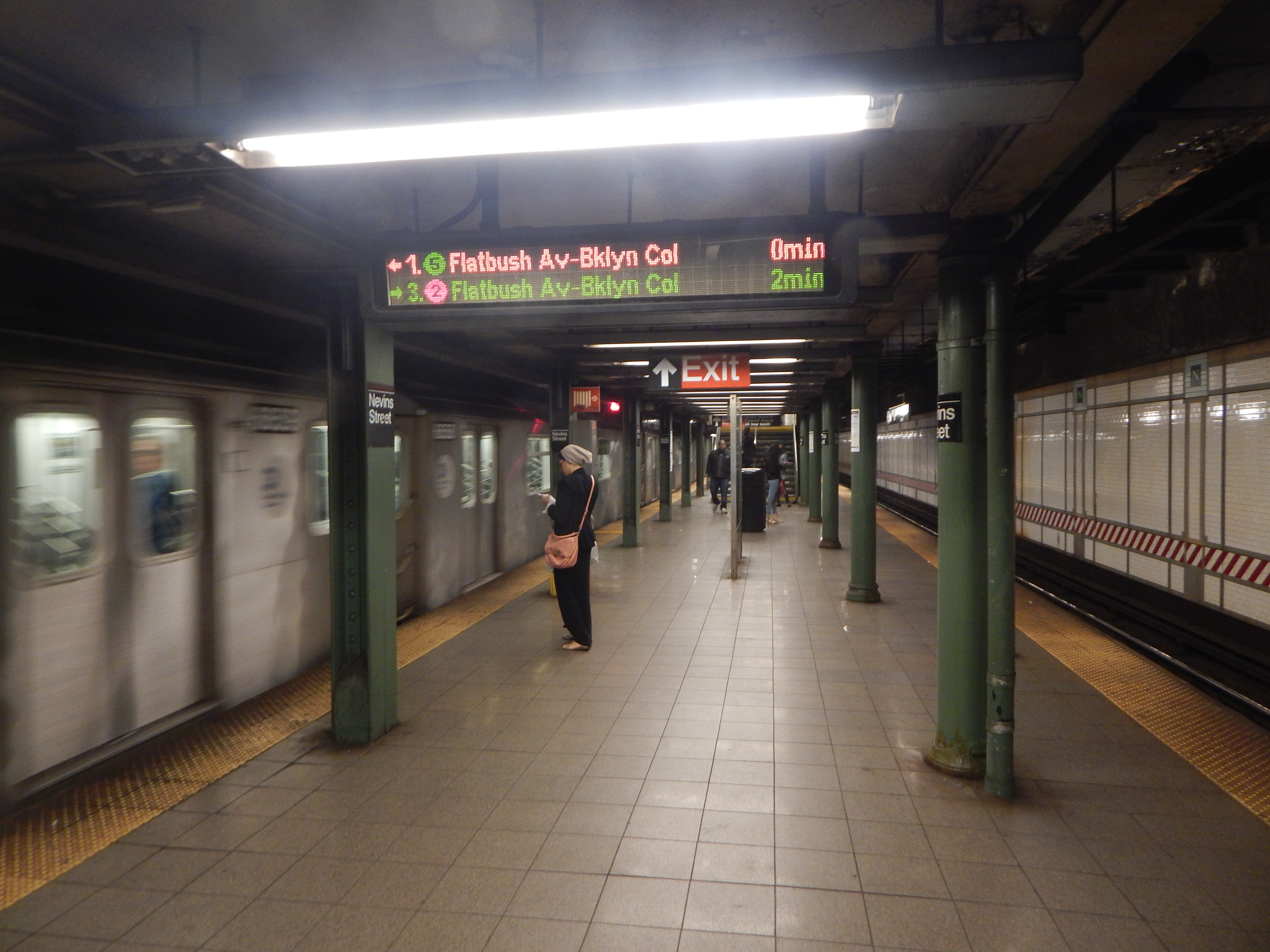
- R142 5 train arriving at the southbound platform

Station statistics
- Address: Nevins Street & Flatbush Avenue; Brooklyn, New York
- Borough: Brooklyn
- Locale: Downtown Brooklyn, Fort Greene
- Coordinates: 40.688709°N 73.980904°W
- Division: A (IRT)
- Line: IRT Eastern Parkway Line
- Services: 2 (all times); 3 (all except late nights); 4 (all times); 5 (weekdays only)
- Transit: NYCT Bus: B25, B26, B38, B41, B45, B52, B67; MTA Bus: B103
- Structure: Underground
- Levels: 2 (lower level abandoned)
- Platforms: 2 island platforms cross-platform interchange
- Tracks: 4

Other information
- Opened: May 1, 1908; 118 years ago
- Accessible: No; planned
- Accessibility: Cross-platform transfer available

Traffic
- 2025: 2,214,747 ▼1.3%
- Rank: 165 out of 423
Services
Preceding station	New York City Subway	Following station
Borough Hall 4 5 via 138th Street–Grand Concourse	Express	Atlantic Avenue–Barclays Center 2 3 4 5 via Franklin Avenue–Medgar Evers College
Hoyt Street 2 3 via 135th Street	Local	Atlantic Avenue–Barclays Center 2 3 4 5 via Franklin Avenue–Medgar Evers College
Location
Location within New York City Subway
Location within New York City
Location within New York
Track layout
Upper level
Lower level
Street map
Station service legend
Symbol	Description
Stops all times except late nights	Stops all times except late nights
Stops all times	Stops all times
Stops weekdays during the day	Stops weekdays during the day
Stops late nights only	Stops late nights only

The Nevins Street station is an express station on the IRT Eastern Parkway Line of the New York City Subway. Located at the intersection of Nevins Street, Flatbush Avenue, and Fulton Street on the border of Downtown Brooklyn and Fort Greene, it is served by the 2 and 4 trains at all times, the 3 train all times except late nights, and the 5 train on weekdays only.

== History ==
=== Construction and opening ===
Planning for a subway line in New York City dates to 1864. However, development of what would become the city's first subway line did not start until 1894, when the New York State Legislature passed the Rapid Transit Act. The subway plans were drawn up by a team of engineers led by William Barclay Parsons, the Rapid Transit Commission's chief engineer. The Rapid Transit Construction Company, organized by John B. McDonald and funded by August Belmont Jr., signed the initial Contract 1 with the Rapid Transit Commission in February 1900, in which it would construct the subway and maintain a 50-year operating lease from the opening of the line. In 1901, the firm of Heins & LaFarge was hired to design the underground stations. Belmont incorporated the Interborough Rapid Transit Company (IRT) in April 1902 to operate the subway.

Several days after Contract 1 was signed, the Board of Rapid Transit Railroad Commissioners instructed Parsons to evaluate the feasibility of extending the subway south to South Ferry, and then to Brooklyn. On January 24, 1901, the Board adopted a route that would extend the subway from City Hall to the Long Island Rail Road (LIRR)'s Flatbush Avenue terminal station (now known as Atlantic Terminal) in Brooklyn, via the Joralemon Street Tunnel under the East River. Contract 2, which gave the IRT a 35-year lease, was executed between the commission and the Rapid Transit Construction Company on September 11, 1902. Work under Fulton Street and Flatbush Avenue in Brooklyn commenced in April 1904.

The IRT line in Brooklyn had been proposed as a two-track line under Fulton Street, expanding to three tracks under Flatbush Avenue. Belmont submitted a revised proposal to the Rapid Transit Commission in April 1905 to widen the line to four tracks. The station at Flatbush Avenue and Fulton Street (now the Nevins Street station) would be redesigned as a two-level station with express and local trains on separate levels. Work was halted until October 1905, at which point two tracks had been added, making four under Fulton Street and five under Flatbush Avenue. The additional trackways were added outside the trackways already set in place. Under the 1905 redesign, numerous provisions were made for connections to future routes, including spurs via Lafayette Avenue, Fourth Avenue, and the Manhattan Bridge. In the area around the Nevins Street station, which was partially constructed as a local station on a three track subway, a new lower level was added underpinning the structure that had been built. The lower level had one trackway and platform in the station, with two connections on each side, all built at great cost under existing work, but none of it was ever used.

The Joralemon Street Tunnel opened in January 1908 along with the Borough Hall station, the first underground subway station in Brooklyn. The Nevins Street station opened when the line was extended three stops to Atlantic Avenue on May 1, 1908. The stations' opening was marked with a parade and a poem praising Belmont. The extension relieved congestion at the overcrowded Borough Hall station, though trains from Atlantic Avenue were already crowded by the time they reached Borough Hall. According to The New York Times, the extension was "regarded as of the utmost importance" because it connected the IRT with the LIRR for the first time. Initially, the station was served by express trains along both the West Side (now the Broadway–Seventh Avenue Line to Van Cortlandt Park–242nd Street) and East Side (now the Lenox Avenue Line). Lenox local trains to 145th Street served the station during late nights.

=== Later years ===
As part of the Dual Contracts, approved in 1913, the New York City Public Service Commission planned to split the original IRT system into three segments: two north-south lines, carrying through trains over the Lexington Avenue and Broadway–Seventh Avenue Lines, and an east–west shuttle under 42nd Street. This would form a roughly H-shaped system. The Broadway–Seventh Avenue Line would split into two branches south of Chambers Street, one of which would turn eastward through Lower Manhattan, run under the East River via a new Clark Street Tunnel, and connect with the existing Contract 2 IRT Brooklyn Line at Borough Hall. The Lexington Avenue Line north of Grand Central–42nd Street opened on August 1, 1918, and all Brooklyn Line services were sent via the Lexington Avenue Line. This was followed by the Clark Street Tunnel on April 15, 1919, which doubled the number of IRT trains that could travel between Manhattan and Brooklyn.

When the Eastern Parkway Line was extended east of Atlantic Avenue in 1920, the Joralemon Street Tunnel services became express services, while the Broadway–Seventh Avenue Line services ran local on the Eastern Parkway Line. Although the Eastern Parkway Line's express tracks already existed, they previously had been used only for storage. The tracks were reconfigured so that Eastern Parkway express trains could no longer stop at the Hoyt Street station, the next stop west. Also in 1920, a project to extend the platforms at the Nevins Street station from 350 feet (110 m) to 480 feet (150 m) to accommodate ten-car trains was completed.

The New York City Board of Transportation announced plans in November 1949 to extend platforms at several IRT stations, including Nevins Street, to accommodate all doors on ten-car trains. Although ten-car trains already operated on the line, the rear car could not open its doors at the station because the platforms were so short. Funding for the platform extensions was included in the city's 1950 capital budget. The New York City Transit Authority (NYCTA) announced plans in 1956 to add fluorescent lights above the edges of the station's platforms.

In 1981, the Metropolitan Transportation Authority listed the station among the 69 most deteriorated stations in the subway system. In April 1993, the New York State Legislature agreed to give the MTA $9.6 billion for capital improvements. Some of the funds would be used to renovate nearly one hundred New York City Subway stations, including Nevins Street.

Charney Companies, the developer of a neighboring building at 95 Rockwell Place, proposed funding accessibility improvements to the station in February 2026. In exchange for the improvements, the developers would be allowed to develop additional floor area under the Zoning for Accessibility program. The city government approved the proposal that June.

== Station layout ==
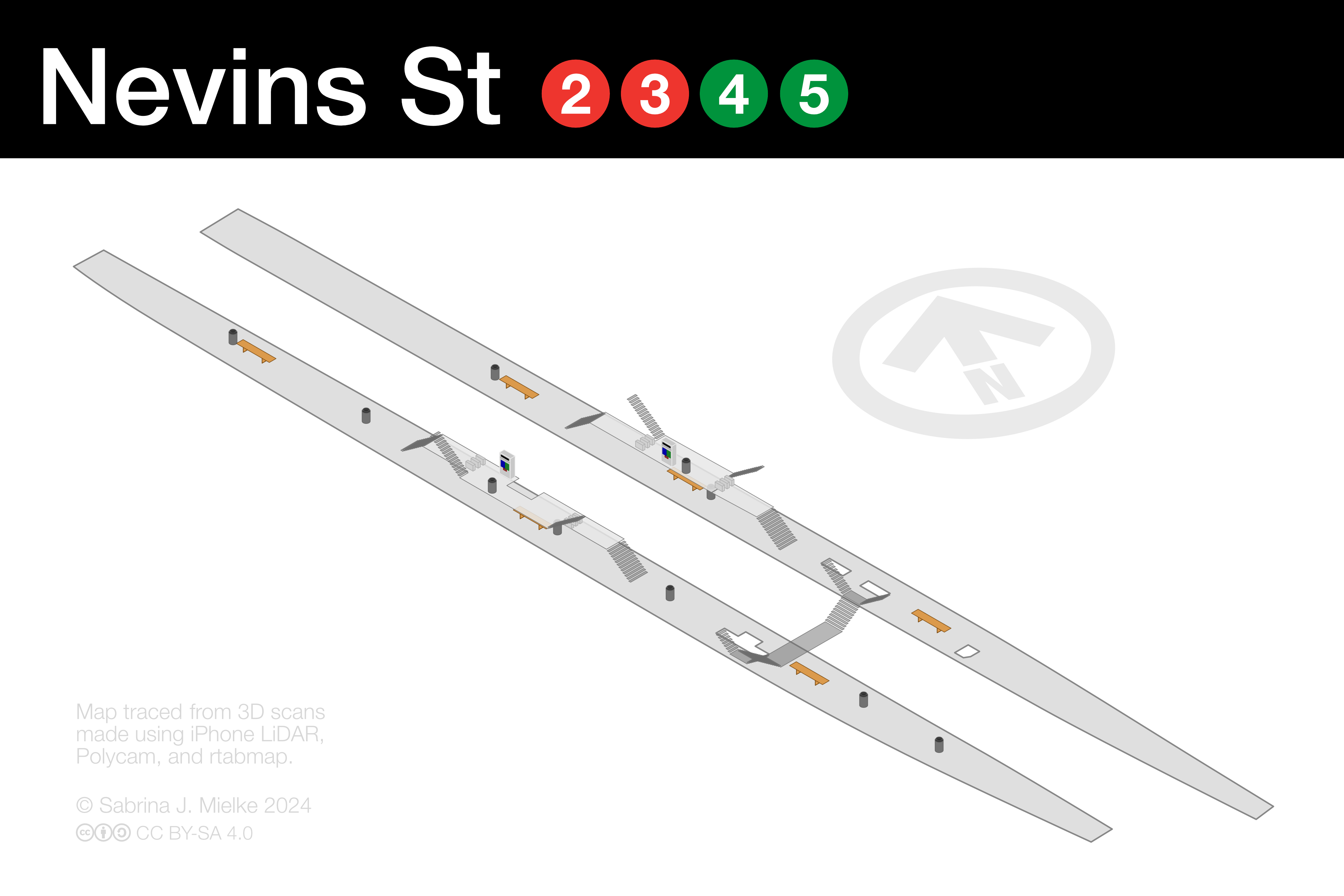
Metrically accurate station map showing platforms, underpass, stairs, ticket machines, gates, benches, and trashcans.

The station has two island platforms, situated between the express and local tracks in each direction. The 2 and 4 stop here at all times; the 3 stops here at all times except late nights, and the 5 stops here only on weekdays during the day. The 2 and 3 run on the local tracks, while the 4 and 5 run on the express tracks. The next stop to the north is Hoyt Street for local trains and Borough Hall for express trains. The next stop to the south for all service is Atlantic Avenue–Barclays Center. There are switches between this station and Atlantic Avenue used by the 4 at night when it runs local.

A fifth track once existed between the two express tracks. The fifth track was removed in 1956. Original plans called for this to be a local station on a three-track line, but before it opened, the two outer local tracks were added. Fare control is in an upper mezzanine, with a crossunder via part of an unused lower-level platform. Next to this platform is a single unused trackway under the southbound local track.

The underpass between the main platforms is the only portion of the lower level that has ever been used. Because the station was designed as a local station with side platforms, it is too close to street level for a mezzanine over the tracks. The stairs up lead to two separate fare control mezzanines located over the platforms only, with stairs up to the street. The only way between platforms inside the station is the underpass.

In the station is a "Nevins St." mosaic. The mezzanine walls feature a mosaic frieze by Anton von Dalen, installed in 1997 and entitled Work & Nature. The mosaic is 14 inches by 83 feet along both walls of the mezzanine. The work is in the tones of soft blue, green, and ochre, like the original platform mosaics. It features stenciled silhouettes in black of a woman operating a sewing machine, a mother taking care of a child, a man planting a tree, an architect reading a blueprint, a female executive addressing a meeting, and famous musician Furry Lewis. All of these characters symbolize, according to the artist, "pride, dignity, and beauty surrounding all work".

=== Exits ===
The station has two exits to each side of Flatbush Avenue east of Nevins Street. The northeastern side's entrances lead to the northbound platform while the southwestern side's entrances lead to the southbound platform.

=== Provisions for other lines ===
This unused trackway was part of several plans for connecting the line to other proposed lines. At its north end, this trackway splits from the southbound local track just south of Hoyt Street, and starts heading downgrade. The track was never laid. At the curve in the subway from Fulton Street to Flatbush Avenue, the trackway curves under the southbound local track, and is joined by another unused trackway heading north along Flatbush Avenue for a proposed Manhattan Bridge connection (which was later built for the BMT, though this connection may have still been planned when that line was built, as the DeKalb Avenue station was designed to allow for it). After the lower Nevins Street platform, a trackway splits to the east for a subway under Lafayette Avenue; this was later built as part of the IND Fulton Street and Crosstown Lines. Just beyond this split, at Lafayette Avenue, the trackway was cut by the IND when the IND was built from 1929 to 1937. On the other side, it rises again to merge with the southbound local track in the midst of the complicated switch layout just north of Atlantic Avenue – Barclays Center. Between this merge and Atlantic Avenue is another unused trackway, splitting from the local track towards a subway under Fourth Avenue (later built as the BMT Fourth Avenue Line). This trackway and another trackway (both built for the same proposed subway) end at the same level, under Fourth Avenue, just west of the Pacific Street station on the current BMT Fourth Avenue Line and a few feet higher.

On the northbound side, the connection provided by the lower level trackway would have been along the northbound local track (which was not in the original plans). The trackway on this side begins by curving from Fourth Avenue under the line. The place it used to rise is covered, as the trackway beyond that point is now used for the northbound local track. The ramp was covered in July 1963, and was made into a level trackway. This ramp was supposed to be northbound trackway of the proposed IRT Fourth Avenue Subway (before the BRT/BMT was built). The northbound local and express tracks were rearranged by November 1963.

Before Nevins Street, there is a bellmouth for the proposed Lafayette Avenue subway that merges into the northbound local track. After Nevins Street, at the curve, there is a short section of wall with no columns, that could be opened up. This was also a proposed connection to the Manhattan Bridge.

Just north of Atlantic Avenue – Barclays Center is another unused trackway, merging into the northbound local track from the LIRR's Atlantic Terminal. A trackway from the southbound tracks existed until 1911, when the platforms at Atlantic Avenue were lengthened.

For a time in the early 1960s, a false wall was installed to seal the ramp to the Nevins Street lower level. The false wall was taken down at a later date for unknown reasons. The Nevins Street lower-level platform had, over the years, become a storage area for various work projects, and until Nevins Street was renovated, the rest of the lower platform was visible from the crossunder. A permanent tile wall now blocks off the lower platform, access to which is via a cellar-type door at the north end of each platform, as well as doors from the crossunder.

== Gallery ==
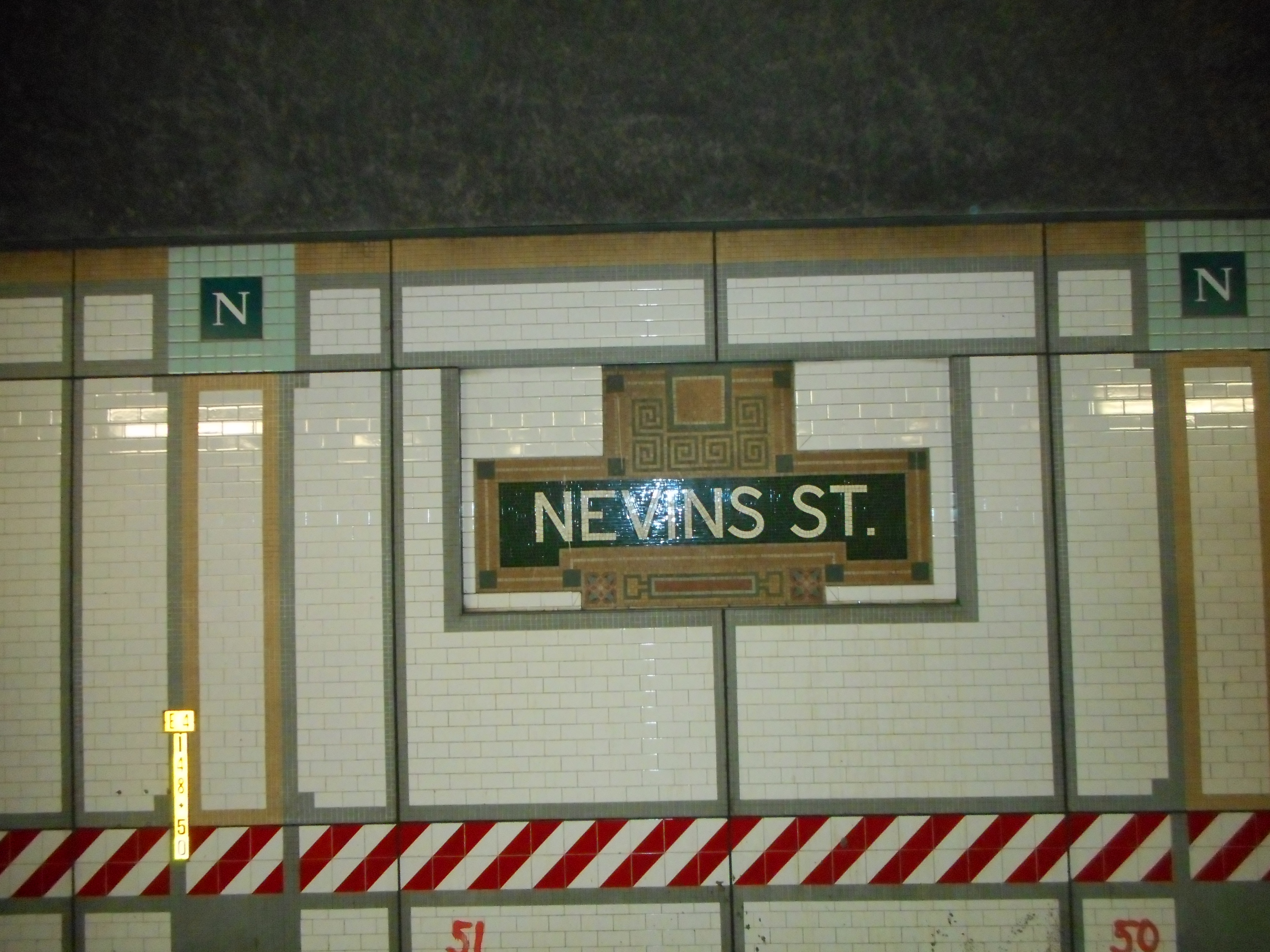
Mosaic

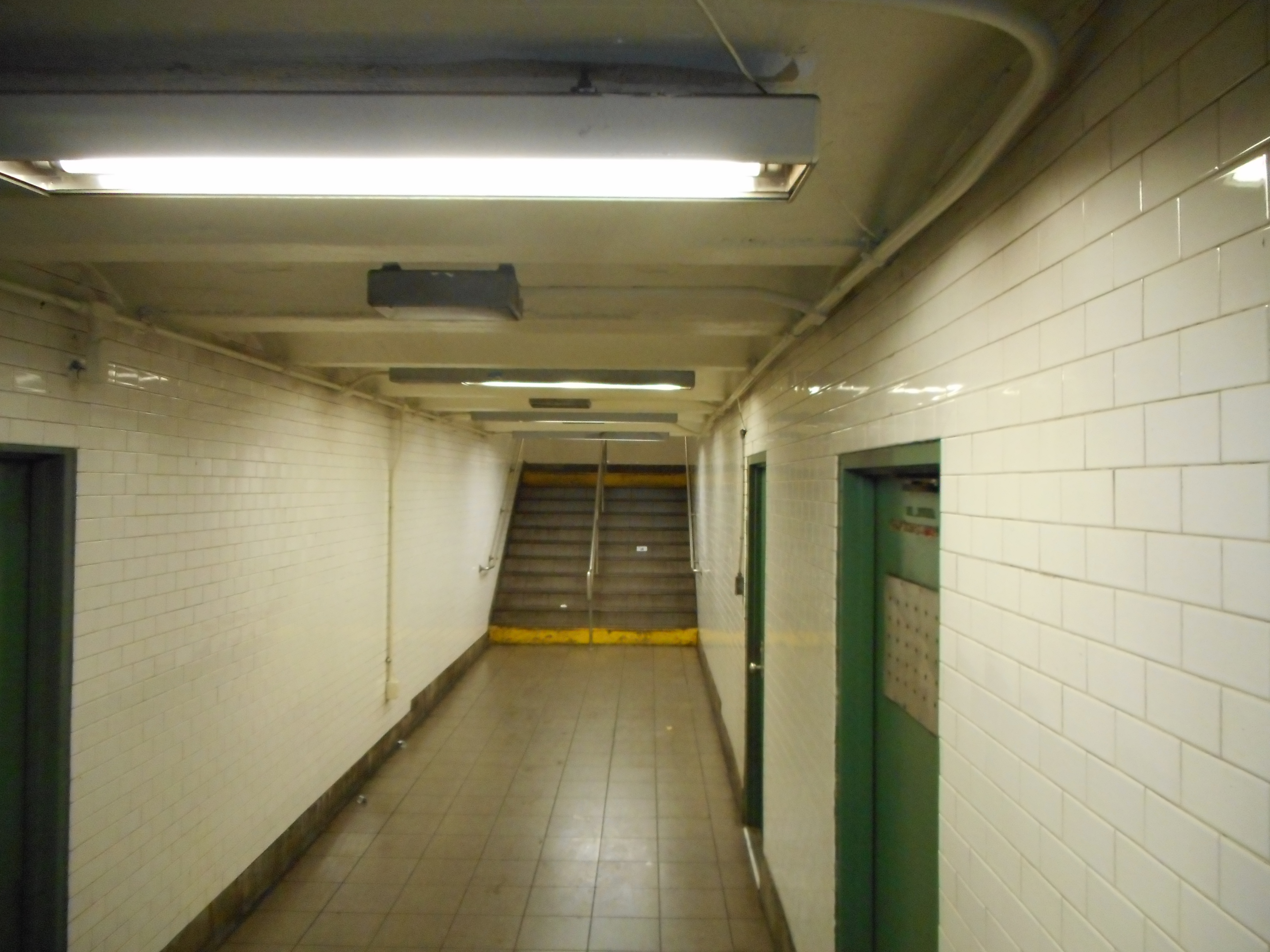
Crossunder tunnel

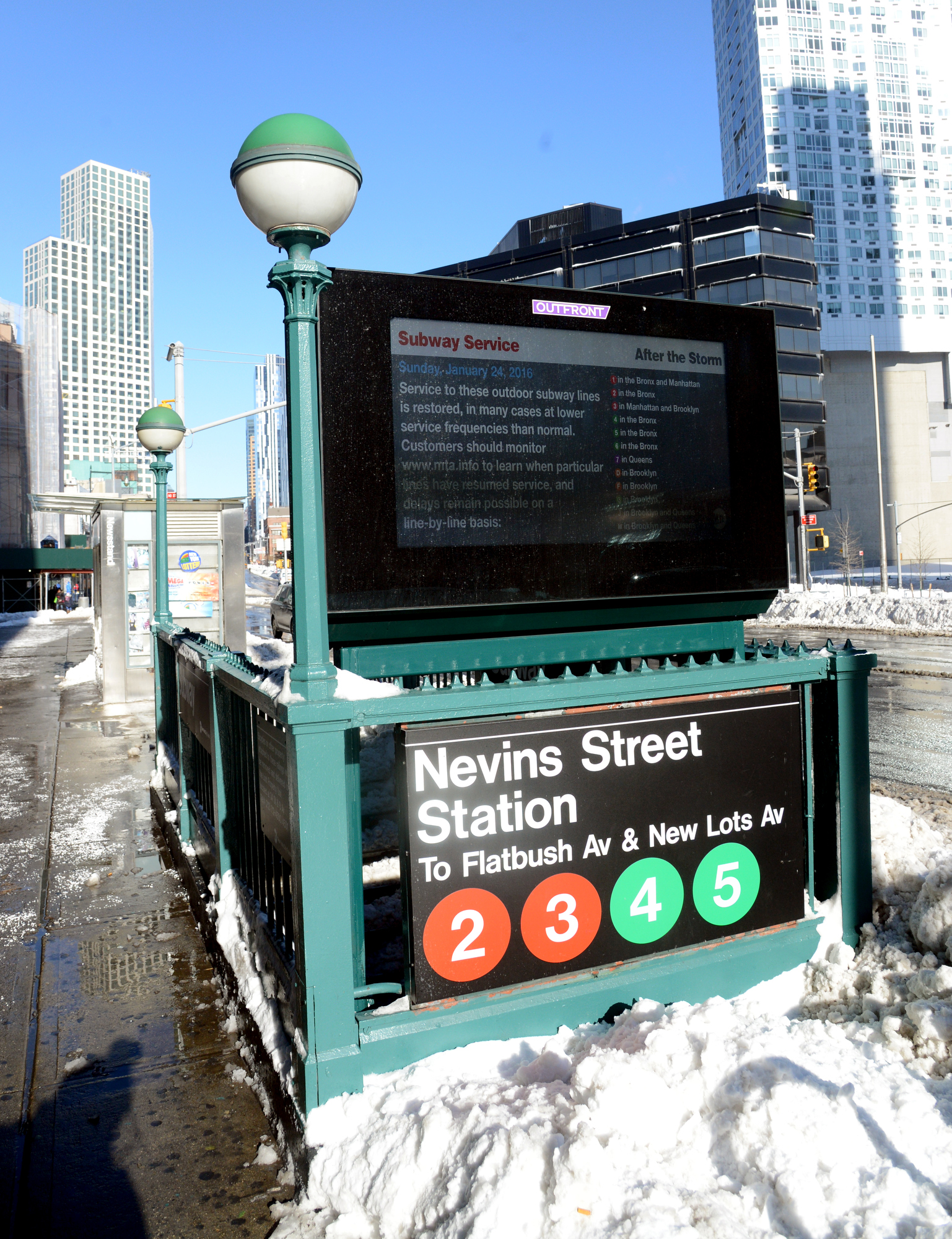
Station entrance
