= Smith & Gray Company Building =

Coordinates: 40°42′36.65″N 73°57′53.35″W

Smith & Gray Company Building was an edifice in the Downtown Brooklyn neighborhood of New York City. It was erected in 1888 in the then-separate city of Brooklyn, New York. Designed by architect Peter J. Lauritzen, the building was eight stories tall. It was situated on an odd-shaped lot at the intersection of Fulton Street, Nevins Street, and Flatbush Avenue. It burned almost entirely in the early part of 1892. The establishment was distinguished by a pair of towers, more than 210 feet high, with a large clock which was illuminated at night. During the fire the clock tower fell down to Fulton Street, destroying the elevated station there. The Brooklyn Eagle said the tower was the "standard of its time" for the area it was in.

Rebuilding began by Smith & Gray in 1893. Part of a three-story structure at the angled corner was planned to rise to ten stories. In several years a seventeen-story structure, a 225-foot-high tower, accompanied the new edifice. It faced Nevins Street with an 18-foot-wide clock. In February 2005 only seven floors of the seventeen-story tower remained.
