= Fulton Street (Brooklyn) =

Street in Brooklyn, New York

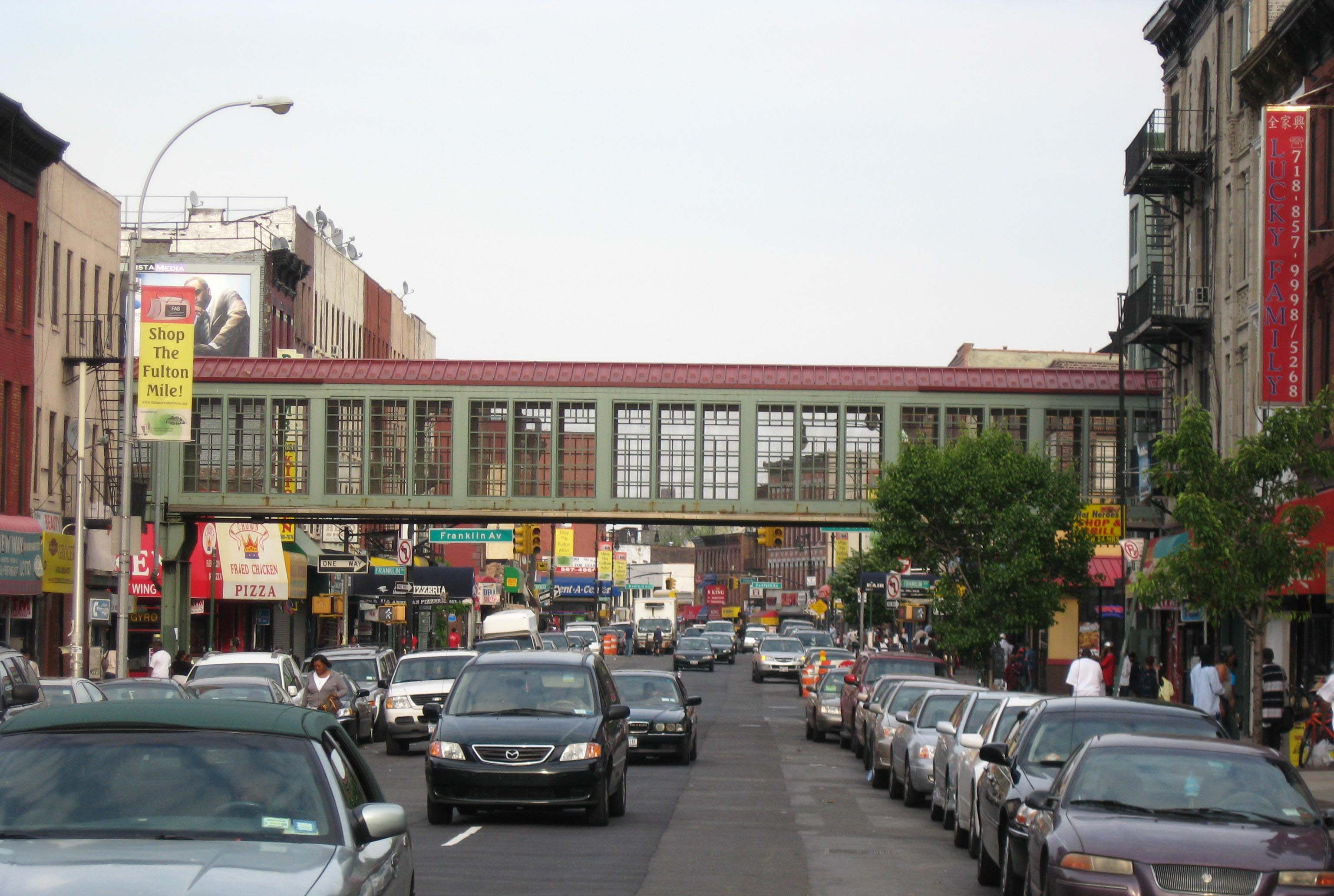
- Fulton Mile shopping district at Franklin Avenue
- Interactive map of Fulton Street
- Namesake: Robert Fulton
- Owner: City of New York
- Maintained by: NYCDOT
- Length: 6.4 mi (10.3 km)
- Location: Brooklyn

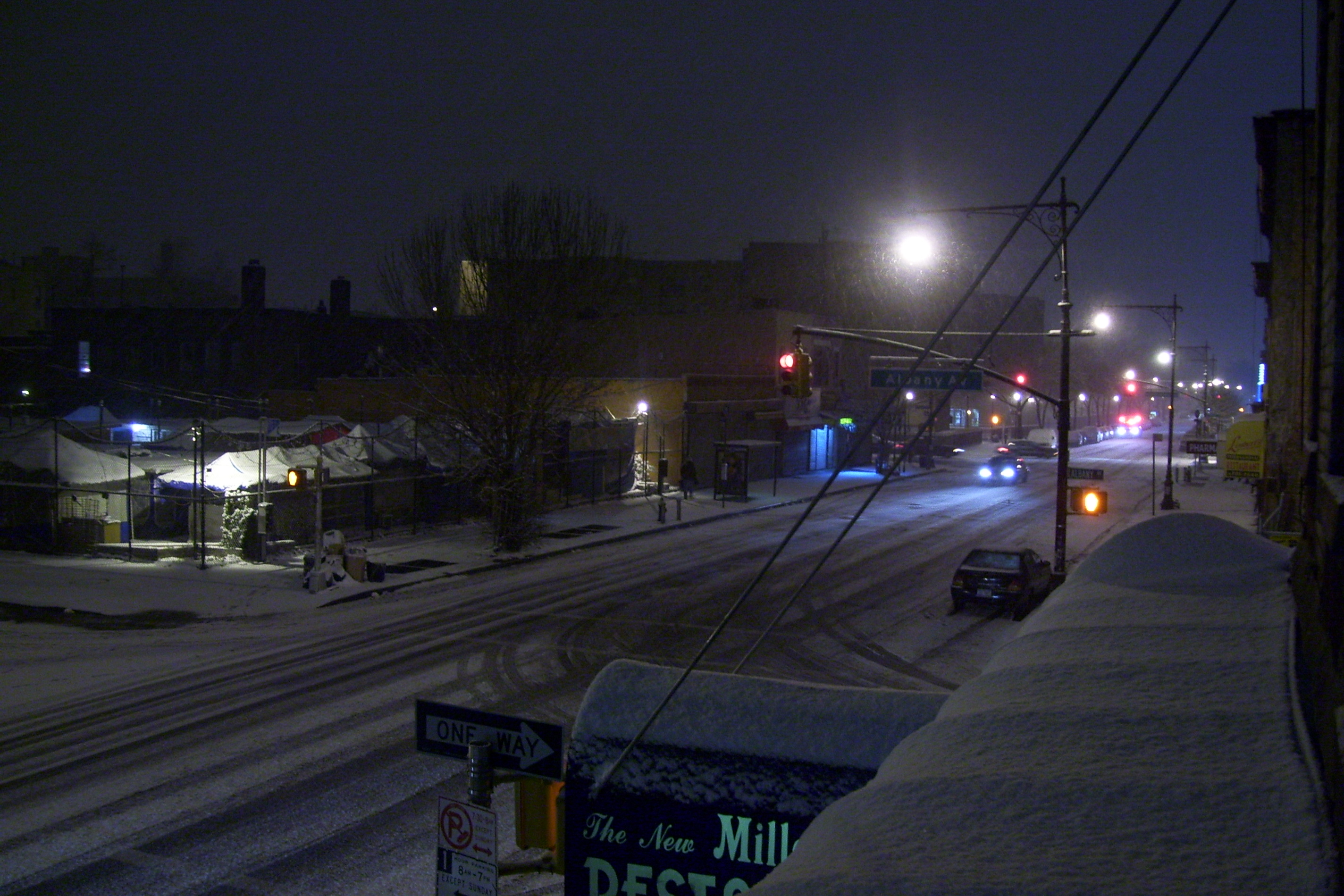
Fulton Street, covered with snow

Fulton Street is a long east–west street in northern Brooklyn, New York City. This street begins at the intersection of Adams Street and Joralemon Street in Brooklyn Heights, and runs eastward to East New York and Cypress Hills. At the border with Queens, Fulton Street becomes 91st Avenue, which ends at 84th Street in Woodhaven.

== History ==
The street is named after Robert Fulton; a street of the same name in Manhattan was linked to this street by Fulton with his steam ferries. For a hundred years before the Fulton Ferry monopoly, Fulton Street was the Ferry Road through Jamaica Pass and, in the centuries before any ferry service, Indian path to the Hempstead Plains. It began at the Fulton Ferry Landing and climbed south through Brooklyn Heights past Brooklyn Borough Hall to where it now begins at Adams Street. Part of the original Fulton Street survives as Old Fulton Street in Brooklyn Heights and Dumbo, and as Cadman Plaza West in Downtown Brooklyn. The segment of Fulton Street that traveled past Borough Hall has been turned into a pedestrian esplanade.

== Route ==
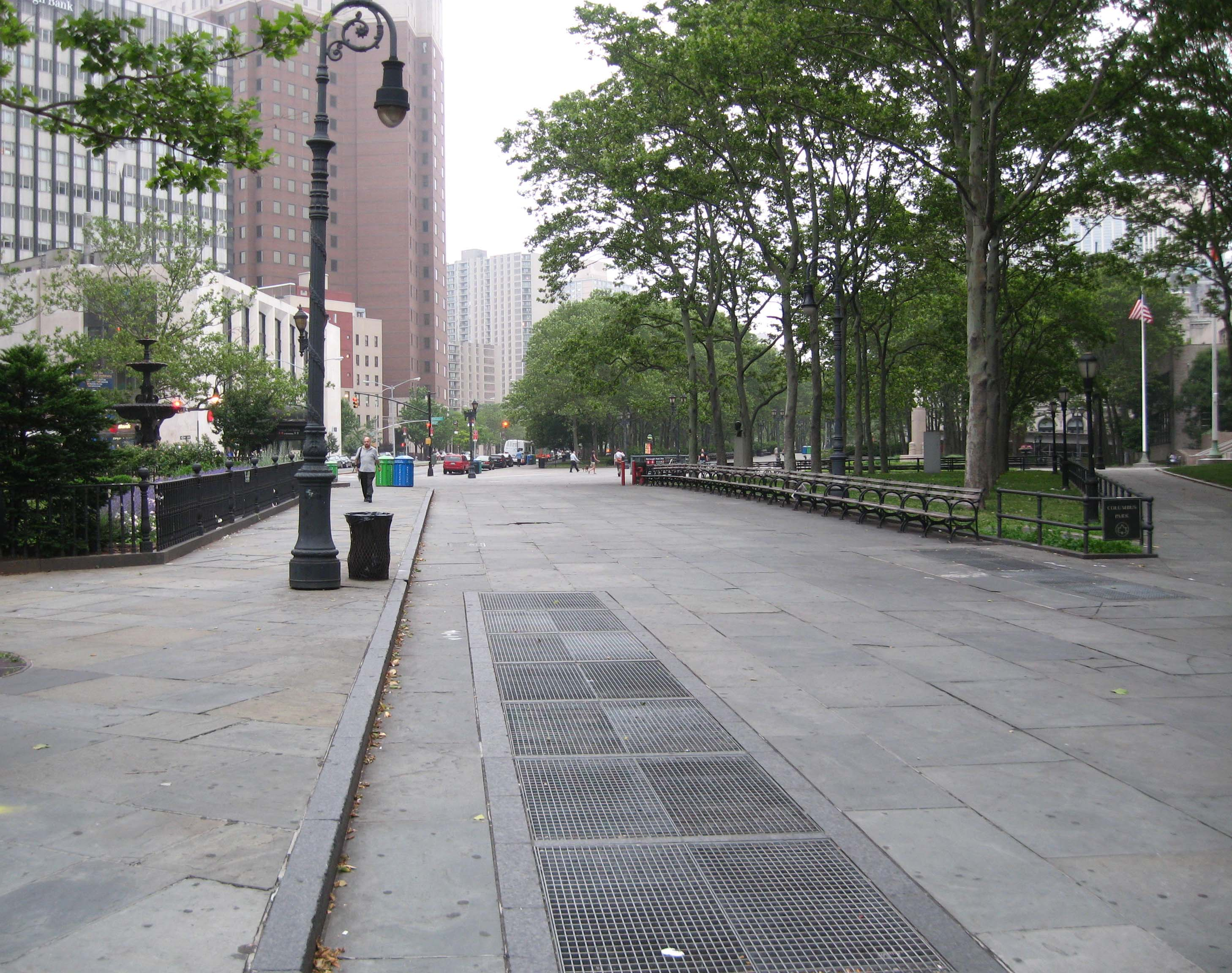
Pedestrian street in Columbus Park leading to Old Fulton Street

The initial segment of Fulton Street as it exists today is the Fulton Mall between Adams Street and Flatbush Avenue. East of Flatbush Avenue, Fulton Street becomes a major artery of Downtown Brooklyn, Fort Greene and Clinton Hill. At Franklin Avenue, Fulton Street then becomes the signature street of Bedford–Stuyvesant. At Broadway Junction in East New York, the street is interrupted by the intersection of Broadway and Jamaica Avenue, but continues on the other side as a one-way residential street through East New York and Cypress Hills until Norwood Avenue, once again as a two-way street reaching the Queens border at Elderts Lane in Woodhaven, Queens. There it becomes 91st Avenue, which continues until 84th Street in Queens.

On March 10, 2005, Fulton Street was co-named Harriet Ross Tubman Avenue along most of its length from Rockaway Avenue in Bedford-Stuyvesant to Elm Place in Downtown Brooklyn, on the anniversary of the death of the ex-slave and abolitionist, which has been designated "Harriet Tubman Day of Commemoration" in New York State.

== Transportation ==
Fulton Street is served by the following subway lines:

- The elevated BMT Fulton Street Line used to run over Fulton Street. The New York City Subway's IND Fulton Street subway line (A and C trains) has replaced it east of Washington Avenue.
- The BMT Jamaica Line (J and Z trains) runs above Fulton Street between Broadway Junction and Crescent Street.

These bus routes serve the corridor:

- The B25 runs on Fulton west of Alabama Avenue. Alabama-bound service is provided via East New York Avenue.
- From Adams Street, the corridor's western end, the B52 heads to Greene Avenue, the B26 runs to Classon Avenue (Ridgewood Terminal) or from Grand Avenue (Downtown Brooklyn), and the B38 goes to Lafayette Avenue (Catalpa/Metro), or from DeKalb Avenue (Downtown Brooklyn).
- Fulton Street-bound B49 service runs from Bedford Avenue to Franklin Avenue, then heads south to terminate at Lefferts Place.
- Northbound B44 locals run from New York Avenue to Bedford Avenue. All other B44 buses cross Fulton.
- The Lefferts Gardens-bound B43 runs from Tompkins Avenue to Brooklyn Avenue, and Greenpoint-bound service runs from Kingston Avenue to Throop Avenue.
- The JFK Airport-bound B15 runs from Marcus Garvey Boulevard to Albany Avenue.
- The northbound B20 and westbound Q24 run from Broadway to Eastern Parkway. From Van Sinderen Avenue, the eastbound Q24 goes to East New York Avenue, and the southbound B20 continues via the avenue to the other side of Fulton Street, until Pennsylvania Avenue.

== Fulton Mall ==
Fulton Mall
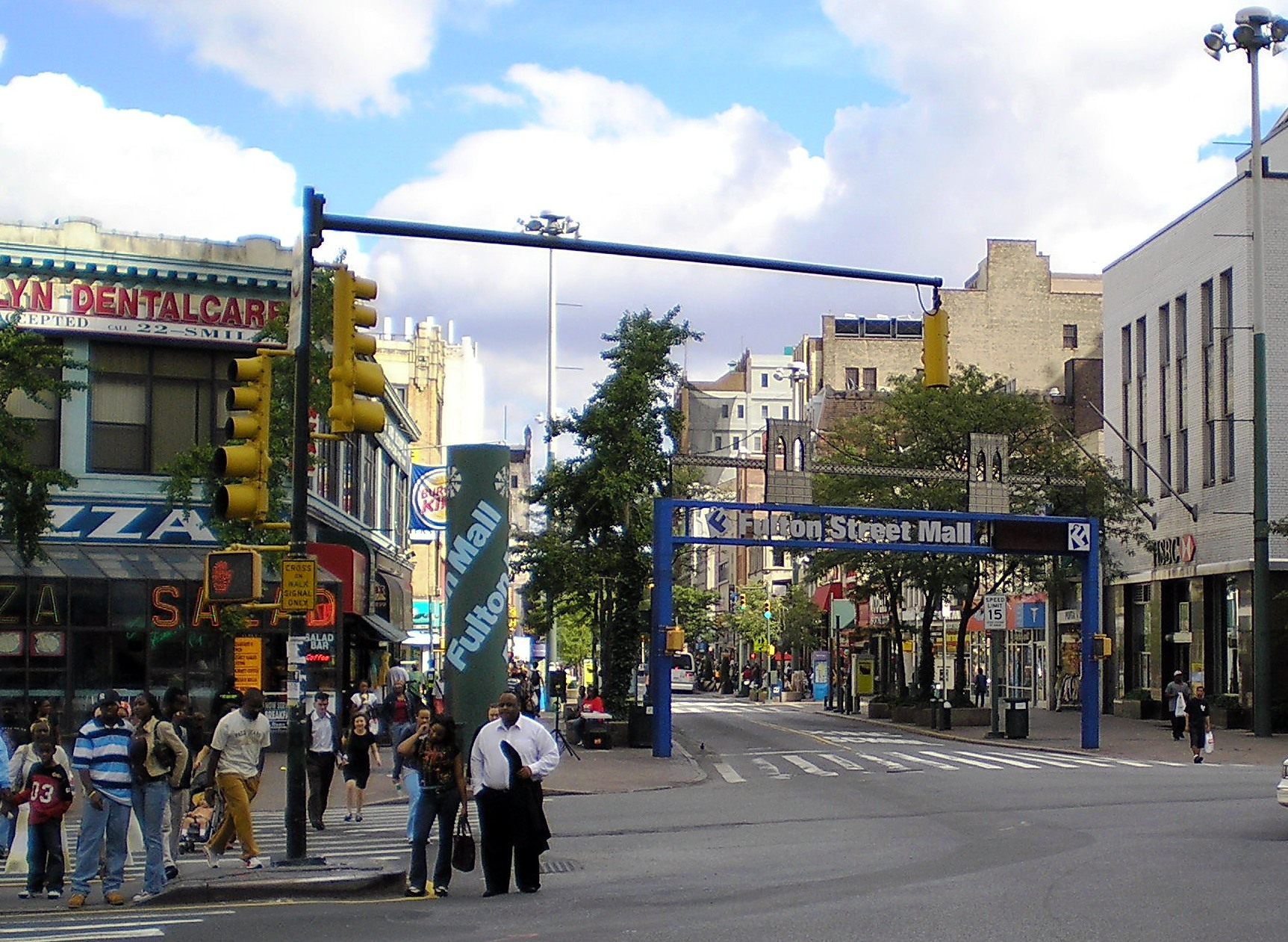

- Location Fulton Mall (New York) Fulton Mall (the United States)
- Locale: Downtown Brooklyn, New York City
- Subway services: A, C, F, <F>, N, R, and W trains at Jay Street – MetroTech; B, D, N, Q, R, and W trains at DeKalb Avenue; A, C, and G trains at Hoyt–Schermerhorn Streets; 2, 3, 4, and 5 trains at Nevins Street and Hoyt Street
- Bus routes: B25, B26, B38, B41, B45, B52, B54, B57, B61, B62, B65, B67, B103

Fulton Mall is a pedestrian street and transit mall in Downtown Brooklyn that runs on Fulton Street between Flatbush Avenue and Adams Street. It contains 230 stores and dedicated bus lanes. For the mall's length, only buses, commercial vehicles, local truck deliveries, and emergency vehicles are allowed to use the street. The center of the mall is an open public space known as Albee Square.

=== History ===
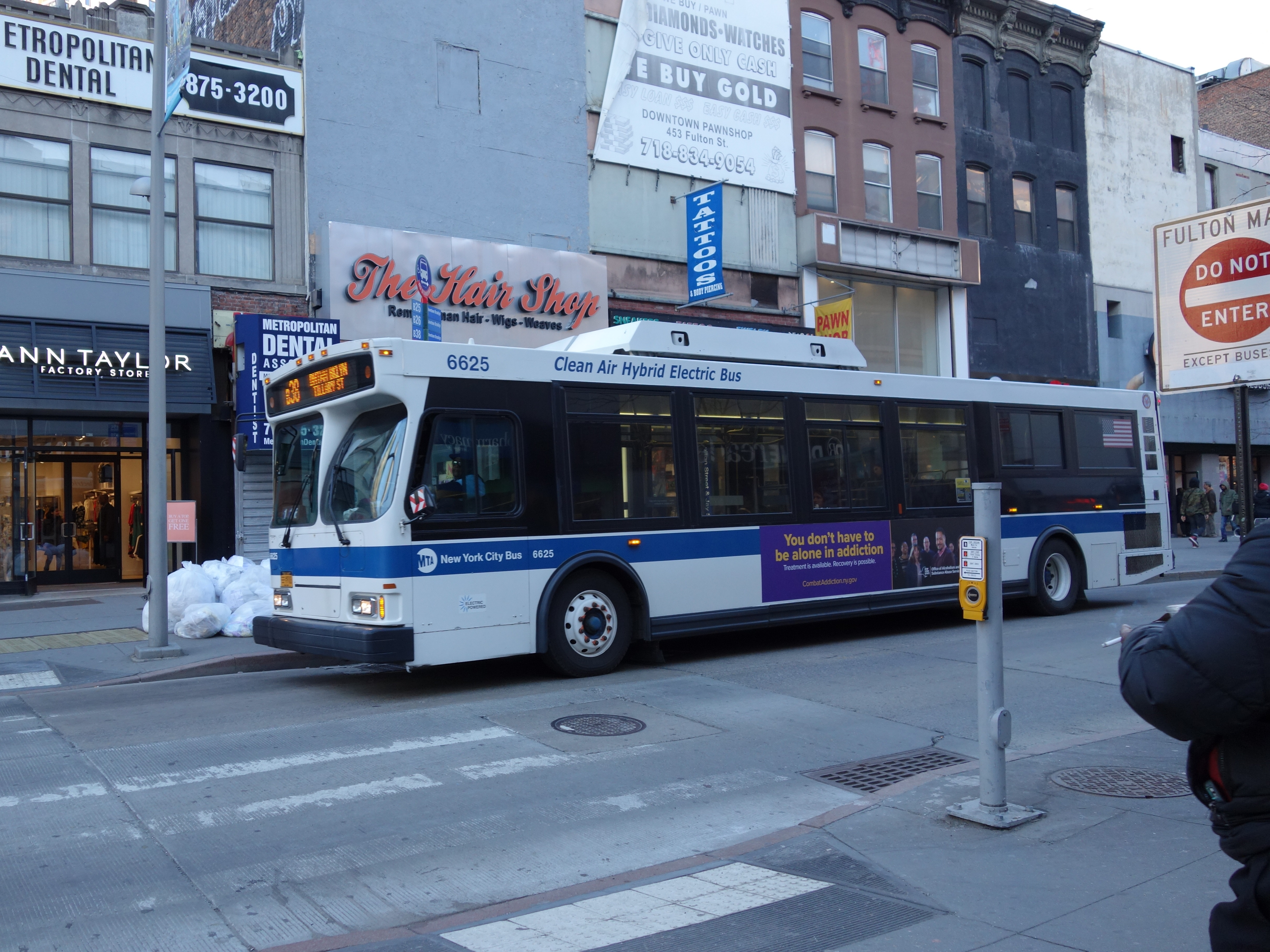
A B38 bus on Fulton Mall

Fulton Street's first period of great vigor occurred before the era of enclosed shopping malls, the era when huge department stores like Abraham & Straus, Frederick Loeser & Co. and A. I. Namm & Son reigned on the street. The current era dates from the 1970s, when through the persistent efforts of the street's merchants, the city agreed to a revitalization program through which it would narrow the roadway, widen the sidewalk, and create, with the exception of buses, a traffic-free shopping area. Architect Lee Harris Pomeroy redesigned the mall in the early 1980s: he designed street furniture and equipment for the project including large, free-standing canopies, vendors’ kiosks, directory and telephone kiosks, and high mast lighting. The graphics program he also designed for the project consists of informational, directional and street signage. Pomeroy's renovation was completed in 1984 for $24 million and received an Albert S. Bard Award from the City Club of New York. Nonetheless, the mall initially failed to attract tenants. In 2024, the city began renovating Fulton Mall again for $8 million, adding benches and trees.

Subway stations at Jay Street–MetroTech, DeKalb Avenue, Hoyt–Schermerhorn Streets, Nevins Street, and Hoyt Street and bus lines service the Fulton Mall area. The area is New York City's third-largest commercial center after Herald Square and a stretch of Madison Avenue. The mall has attracted major investments from prominent Brooklyn retail real estate developers such as Stanley Chera, Albert Laboz, Joseph Jemal, and Eli Gindi.

=== Developments ===
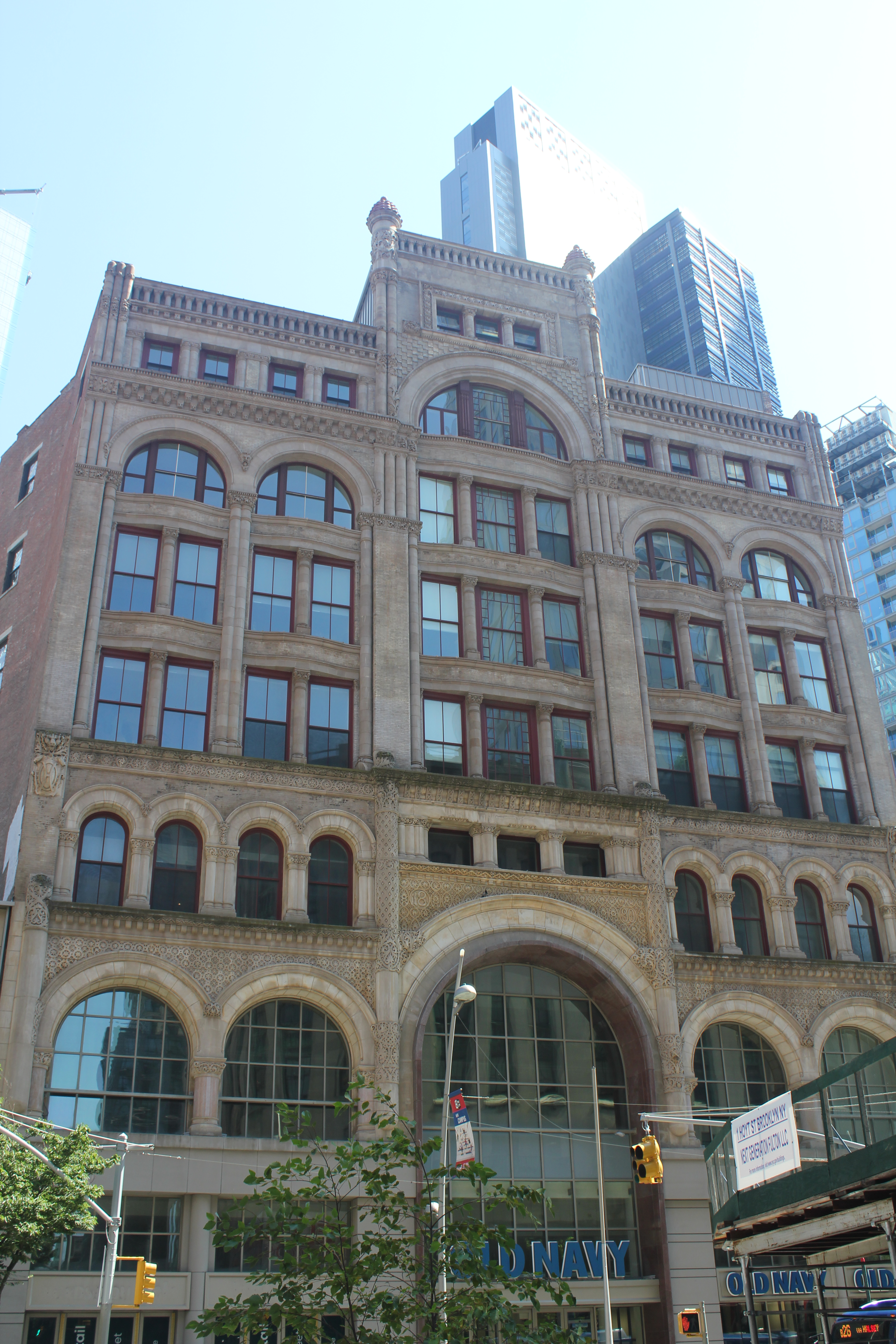
The Offerman Building

Fulton Mall includes major retailers such as Macy's, H&M, Gap, GameStop, Foot Locker, Modell's Sporting Goods, and Finish Line. The Fulton Mall Improvement Association is the local business improvement district. According to the Improvement Association, in 2003 the Fulton Mall area saw between 100,000 and 125,000 visitors a day. The mall has spurred additional commercial development in its immediate vicinity, such as the City Point development, and has become the most expensive place to do business in downtown Brooklyn. Fulton Street's retail space was $301 per square foot in 2016 and $326 per square foot in 2017.

The Macy's store at 422 Fulton Street was originally Abraham & Straus's flagship store. The building was designed in Art Deco style by Starrett & Van Vleck and built in 1933. It was formerly the showroom for the W.C. Vosburgh Mfg. Co. As of 2017, the building is undergoing a $194 million renovation by Tishman Speyer. Its new portion will have 10 floors dedicated to Class A office space. Macy's is also renovating its part of the building.

The Offerman Building on Fulton Mall was built in 1893 by Henry Offerman, a businessman in the sugar industry. It was designed in the Romanesque Revival architectural style and originally hosted retail on the ground floor. The Offerman Building was designated a New York City Historic Landmark in 2005, and by 2017 had been converted into a 121-unit residential complex. Across the street is another designated city landmark, the A. I. Namm & Son Department Store.

== See also ==
- Smith & Gray Company Building
