= Stanley Chera =

American real estate developer

- Born: Stanley Isaac Chera; October 22, 1942; New York City, US
- Died: April 11, 2020 (aged 77); New York City, US
- Occupations: Businessman, investor
- Known for: Founder of Crown Acquisitions
- Spouse: Frieda
- Children: 3

Stanley Isaac Chera (October 22, 1942 – April 11, 2020) was an American billionaire, businessman and investor. The founder of Crown Acquisitions. Born in Brooklyn to a Syrian Jewish family, Chera started purchasing real estate in New York City in the 1980s, first as a minority partner and later in the 2000s as the lead developer. In 2017, his net worth was estimated at $4 billion.

Chera had a wife and three sons. Chera died due to complications brought on by COVID-19.

== Early life ==
Chera was born on October 22, 1942, in Brooklyn, New York City, to a Syrian Jewish family. In 1947, his father Isaac Chera opened a retail store called Young World in Brooklyn. The family later purchased the building and grew Young World into a chain purchasing the buildings as they expanded.

== Career ==
In the 1980s, Chera (then in charge of the family company) started purchasing real estate in New York City at first as a minority partner and later in 2000s as the lead developer. Chera was known for developing or "repositioning" the retail portion of his buildings and then selling the property.

In a joint venture with The Carlyle Group and Charles Kushner, Chera sold the retail portion of 666 Fifth Avenue in two transactions for more than $1 billion; and also the retail portion of the St. Regis Hotel in a joint venture with Lloyd Goldman and Jeffrey Feil for $380 million. In 2010, he began the restoration of The Knickerbocker Hotel in Manhattan. In 2012, Chera purchased 49.9% interest in a four-building Fifth Avenue portfolio that included the Olympic Tower for $1 billion from the Alexander S. Onassis Public Benefit Foundation.

In June 2013, Chera purchased 650 Madison Avenue for $1.3 billion in partnership with Highgate Holdings from the Carlyle Group. He was an investor in the One World Trade Center and accumulated significant property in Red Hook, Brooklyn. Crown was also a prominent investor (along with Albert Laboz, Joseph Jemal, and Eli Gindi) in the Fulton Mall in Brooklyn. Chera had a conservative investment strategy borrowing no more than 25–35% of the purchase price given that they were long term holders in assets. In 2009, Crown held 15,000,000 square feet (1,400,000 m^{2}) real estate in New York City.

== Personal life ==
Chera and his wife Frieda, nicknamed "Cookie", had three sons: Isaac "Ike", Haim, and Richard, all active in the family business. Chera was a leader in the Brooklyn Sephardic Jewish community. Chera was an associate and friend of Donald Trump, and donated to the Trump Victory Committee.

== Death ==
Chera was hospitalized for an unknown illness in March 2020 and later tested positive for COVID-19. Prior to his hospitalization, he had relocated to his home in Deal, New Jersey. Chera entered a coma the following week and died on April 11, 2020. His wife also contracted the virus, but recovered.

Donald Trump, in a May 2020 Fox News interview, described Chera's death as having a high impact on his thinking:

I've lost three friends. One, a very good friend, a very successful man, New York guy, employed a lot of people that were all crying over his death. Stanley Chera. He went to the hospital, he calls me up. He goes, "I tested positive." I said, "Well, what are you going to do?" He said, "I'm going to the hospital. I'll call you tomorrow." He didn't call. I call the hospital, he's in a coma. Now, I know a lot of people that had the flu, they were never in a coma.

When Trump contracted COVID-19 himself, he was reported to have asked if he was "going out like Stan Chera".
