= Jordache =

American clothing, real estate and aviation company

Jordache Enterprises, Inc.
- Type: Private
- Industry: Clothing, real estate, agriculture, maritime, and aviation
- Founded: 1969; 57 years ago (as Jordache Jeans Inc.); 1978 (incorporated)
- Founders: Joseph "Joe" Nakash; Abraham "Avi" Nakash; Raphael "Ralph" Nakash
- Headquarters: New York City, New York, U.S.
- Area served: Worldwide, with significant United States and Israel involvement
- Revenue: ~$413 million (2016)
- Owner: Nakash (Naccache) family
- Subsidiaries: Major subsidiaries: Jordache clothing; Jordache real estate; RVCA Clothing; Strip House (NYC and Las Vegas locations); The Setai (hotel chain); Prinir Agriculture; Port of Eilat (management); Downeast Air; MG Aviation; Arkia Israel Airlines; Israeli Network (U.S. operations)
- Website: Jordache (clothing line); Jordache (corporate page)

Jordache Enterprises, Inc. (/ˈdʒɔːrdæʃ/) is an American clothing company that markets apparel, including shirts, jeans, and outerwear. The brand is known for its designer jeans that were popular in the late 1970s and early 1980s. Since the 2000s, Jordache has also diversified into real estate in the United States and other ventures in Israel. The brand name Jordache is a contraction of Joe, Ralph, and Avi Nakash.

== History ==
Jordache originated in 1978, when brothers Joe, Ralph, and Avi Nakash opened a denim store in New York City. Inspired by European fashions, the brothers had developed a collection. Business expanded over the years, until a fire destroyed their inventory during the New York City blackout of 1977. In 1978, they officially began to manufacture and distribute denim under their own label, known as Jordache, with form-fitting silhouettes for both men and women, a horse-head logo, and back pocket stitching.

To differentiate their brand, the brothers invested one-quarter of their annual sales volume ($300,000 of their own money and $250,000 in loans) into an aggressive 1979 ad campaign. Jordache produced a television commercial starring an apparently topless woman in tight Jordache jeans riding a horse through the surf. The ad was rejected by all three major United States television networks, but independent New York stations aired it, and Jordache's popularity increased significantly. Later, an additional one million dollars was spent on advertising, including full-color advertisements in magazines circulated nationally in the United States. One promotional gimmick that did not work out was the Jordache blimp, a poorly designed airship that crashed on October 8, 1980, in Lakehurst, New Jersey, on its maiden flight. It was en route to a promotional gala and crashed 43 years after the Hindenburg airship disaster in the same city.

In the 1980s, the company expanded its reach with expansive licensing that generated up to $300 million per year in wholesale income. In 1989, the company had 100 licensees manufacturing products as varied as children's socks, women's outerwear, jewelry, dresses, luggage, and umbrellas.

== Operations ==
Today, Jordache Enterprises is a privately held conglomerate. The company designs and manufactures a wide variety of denim, apparel, and accessories. In 2018, Jordache unveiled a premium denim collection in celebration of the brand's 40th anniversary.

The brands owned by Jordache Enterprises include Jordache, Earl Jeans, KIKIT Jeans, Maurice Sasson, Fubu Ladies, Airport, Blue Star, and Gasoline. Jordache is also an official licensee of the U.S. Polo Assn. brand and manufactures private-label denim for companies worldwide.

Through the initial proceeds from the Jordache label, the Nakash brothers have expanded Jordache Enterprises, Inc., into real estate, hospitality, aviation, high-tech cryptography, maritime ventures, and agriculture. Beyond its namesake brand, its more notable holdings include real estate in New York City, The Setai Miami, and hotels throughout Europe and Israel. The conglomerate also owns part of the Strip House restaurant chain, manages the Port of Eilat following its privatization, and controls Arkia (Israel's second largest airline) and MG Aviation, an aircraft leasing firm. Jordache Enterprises has two separate boards: one comprising six Nakash family members, and an outside board with 10 non-family members. Each male member of the second generation is highly specialized and has a nominal responsibility.

== See also ==
- Gitano Group Inc
- Bonjour Jeans
- Sasson Jeans
- Guess Jeans
