= Joseph Nakash =

American businessman (born 1943)

- ג'ו נקש
- Born: 1943 (age 82–83); Jaffa, Israel
- Occupations: Businessman; real estate investor
- Known for: Co-founder of Jordache Enterprises
- Spouse: Susan Nakash
- Children: 5

Joseph "Joe" Nakash (Hebrew: ג'ו נקש; born 1942) is an Israeli-American businessman, real estate investor, and co-founder of Jordache Enterprises. In 2020, Forbes magazine estimated his family's net worth at $1.93 billion.

== Early life ==
Nakash was born in Tel Aviv, Israel, to parents of Syrian Mizrahi Jewish descent. In 1962, he immigrated to New York City, where he worked as a stock boy and saved enough money to bring his brothers Raphael (Ralph) and Abraham (Avi) to the United States in 1966.

== Career ==
In 1974, Nakash and his brothers pooled $20,000 in savings to purchase an appliance store called V.I.M. and open a retail store in Bushwick, Brooklyn. Latching onto the newfound popularity of designer jeans, they sold irregular jeans. By 1978, they had four stores. After their largest store was burned down during the New York City blackout of 1977, they took the $120,000 policy settlement and started to manufacture their own brand of upscale jeans under the Jordache label.

Nakash hired advertising executive Howard Goldstein, who in turn hired composer and lyricist Leigh Crizoe, known for producing many popular advertising campaigns and jingles in New York City. Crizoe created the "You've Got The Look I Want To Know Better, The Jordache Look" music jingle and campaign for the Nakash brothers. The Nakash Brothers funded the campaign with $300,000 of their own money and $250,000 from Israel's Bank Leumi. The campaign made the brand a resounding success with all age and gender demographics. In future commercials, Brooke Shields was promoted in the Jordache ads, serving as the company's in-house model. The Crizoe jingle was utilized by Jordache Enterprises for almost 10 years in their advertising campaigns and is said to have spawned the designer jeans boom of the 1980s.

In 1979, Jordache had $72 million in sales. In 1981 they started licensing the brand, which added $100 million to their $200 million a year in wholesale revenue for its jeans and expanded their line to include children's clothing, makeup, handbags, and suitcases. In 1983, revenues grew to $400 million, and they founded Yama Maritime Inc., which owned eight cargo ships.

In 1983, the Nakash brothers acquired a 50% stake in Guess Jeans from the Marciano Brothers (Paul, Georges, Armand, and Maurice) of Los Angeles. The joint venture eventually soured. In 1989, a California superior court jury found that the Naskash brothers had fraudulently lured the Marcianos into the transaction. In 1990, the Nakash brothers settled for $66 million of $106 million escrowed profits and the ownership of the brand name "Gasoline" while the Marciano brothers received the brand "Diesel." In the 1990s the Jordache brand suffered in the face of new competition. In 1995, they took the brand down market, selling Jordache jeans at the discount chain Wal-Mart while higher-end retailers such as Macy's dropped the brand. Their efforts were successful, selling $100 million worth of jeans in the first year with Wal-Mart, which made up 30% of Jordache Enterprises' total sales. They then moved into contract manufacturing, making jeans and clothing for Tommy Hilfiger, the Gap, American Eagle, and Abercrombie & Fitch.

Using profits from their apparel business, they diversified and started investing in banking and real estate primarily in New York, Miami, New Jersey, and Israel. Nakash also purchased Arkia, a non-profitable discount airline flying between Israel and Europe, which they returned to profitability. In 2004, the brothers purchased AMPA Real Estate of Israel and expanded into the purchase of hotels and development of residential projects in Israel. They own the Park Plaza Orchid Hotel in Tel Aviv and the Kineret Orchid Vacation Resort on the Sea of Galilee.

In 2006, Nakash and his brothers began investing in Israeli agriculture, establishing an oil press for $2 million in partnership with Revivim, a kibbutz in southern Israel, which produces olive oil under the Halutza brand. The brothers have invested about $5.5 million in olive groves, olive oil production, and vineyards. In 2013, via their investment company Nakash Holdings, they purchased a $100 million office building in Washington, D.C. In 2013, they purchased (along with Eli Gindi) the Versace Mansion in Miami Beach, outbidding Donald Trump. where the Nakashes own five other hotels. In April 2013, they purchased—via their Papo Shipping Company—the exclusive right to operate the Port of Eilat in Israel for 15 years for the price of $105 million. In April 2013, Nakash and his brothers purchased the Isrotel Tower in Tel Aviv for $150 million.

== Politics ==
During the 2020 US Presidential election, Nakash contributed "$385,000 to [the campaign of Donald] Trump and the Republican National Committee" and "$250,000 to Trump's Victory PAC".

During Trump's second term in office, private jets owned by shell companies connected to Nakash and Eli Gindi were used for at least 8 flights deporting migrants from the United States, including deportations to third countries where those migrants had no ties, and where they were held in indefinite detention.

== Personal life ==
Nakash is a practicing Jew. He is considered the patriarch of the Nakash family.
