= Century 21 (department store) =

American department store chain

Century 21 Department Stores LLC

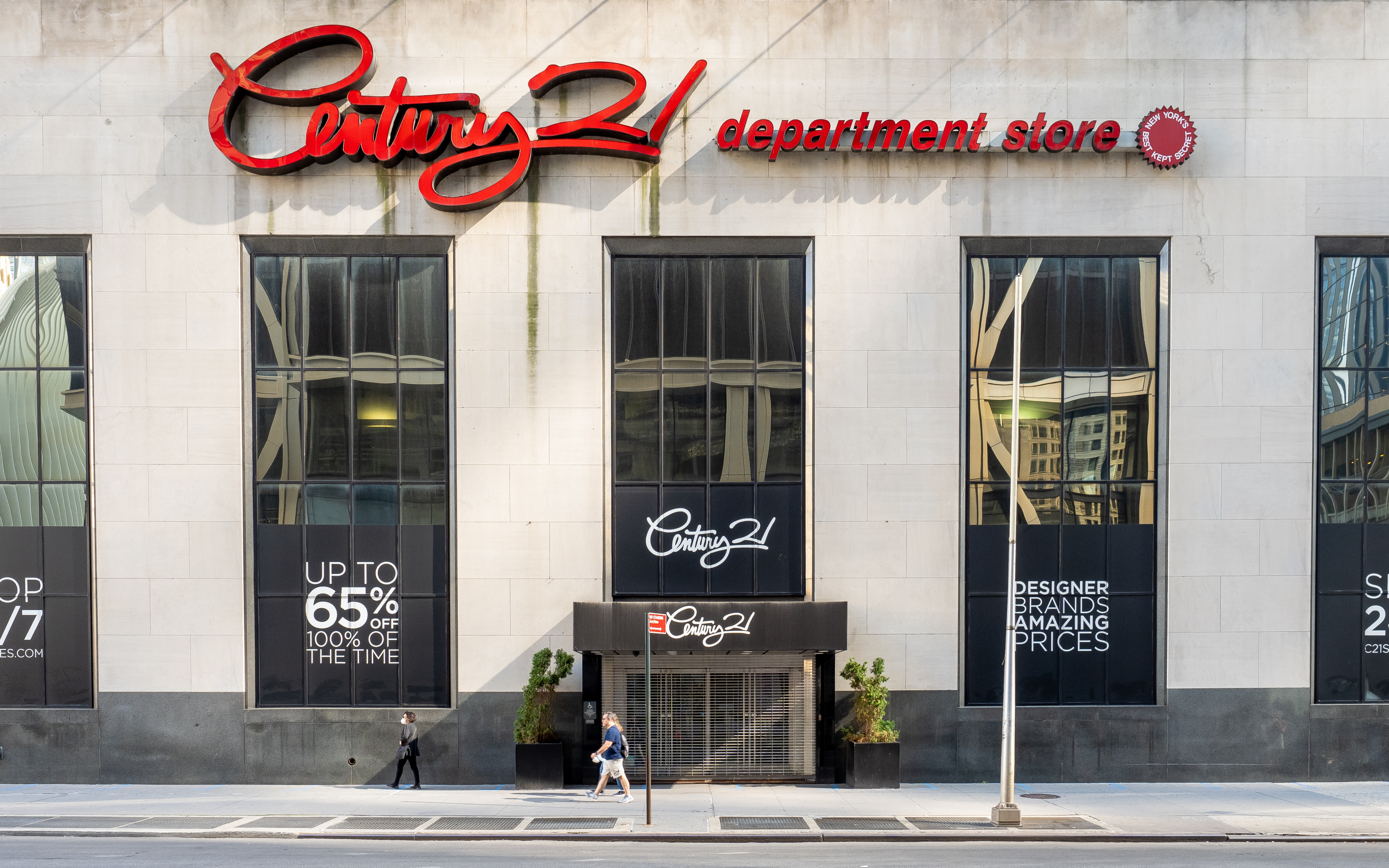
- Flagship Store in Lower Manhattan, which closed on December 6, 2020, and reopened on May 16, 2023
- Type: Private
- Industry: Retail
- Founded: 1961 (65 years ago)
- Founder: Ralph I Gindi
- Fate: Rebranding
- Headquarters: New York City, United States
- Number of locations: 1 (2023)
- Key people: Ralph Gindi
- Products: Clothing, footwear, bedding, furniture, jewelry, beauty products, electronics and housewares
- Revenue: $747 million (2019)
- Subsidiaries: Loehmann's
- Website: http://c21stores.com

Century 21 Department Stores LLC is an American chain of department stores, headquartered in New York City, which had 13 locations in the northeastern United States at the time of its closing in 2020. In 2023, the flagship center next to the World Trade Center reopened.

== History ==
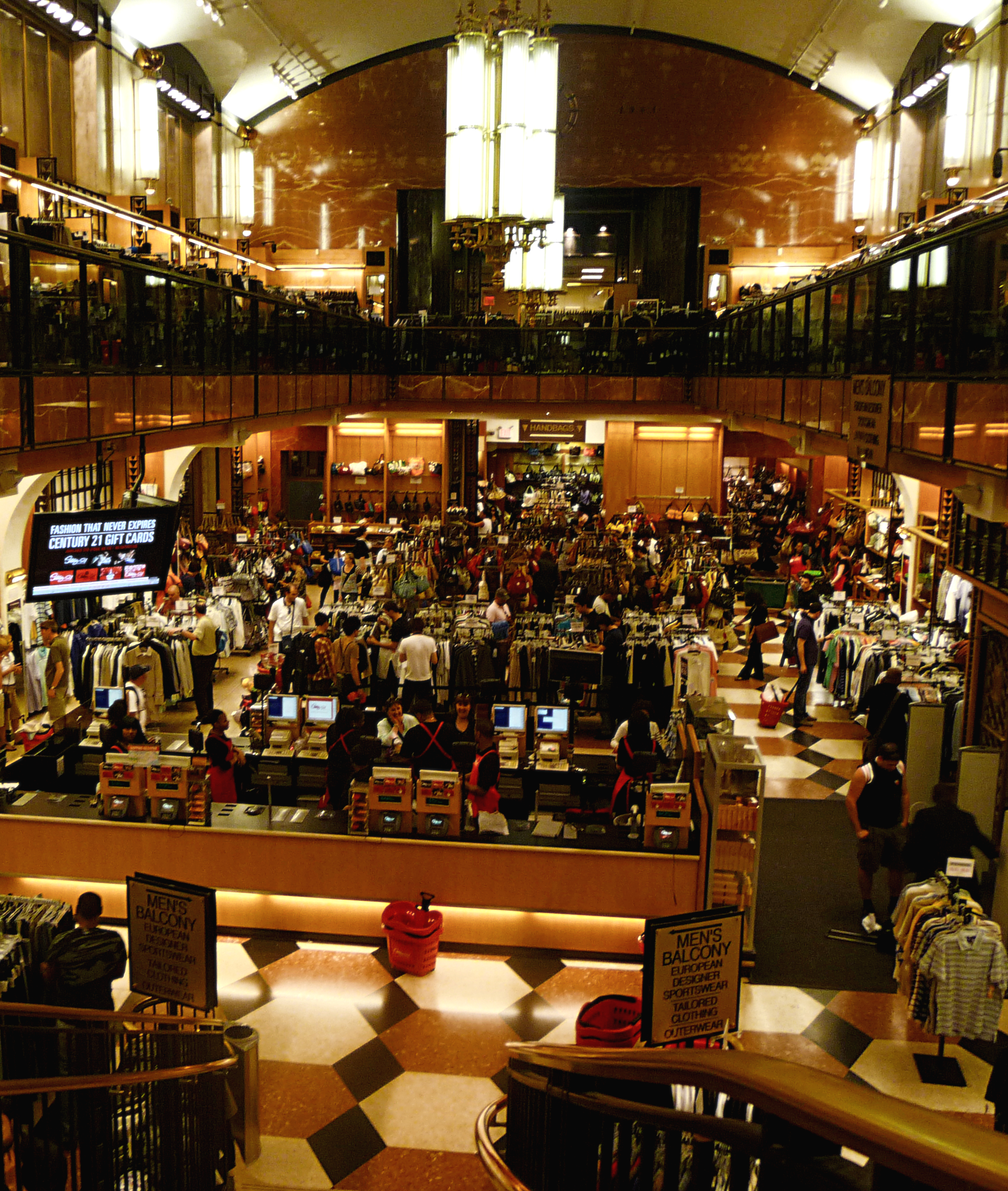
Inside Century 21 in 2012

The company was founded in 1961, by Syrian Jews, Sonny Gindi, Ralph I Gindi, and Al Gindi. The original store is located at 472 86th Street in Bay Ridge, Brooklyn. Founder Al Gindi's son, Raymond Gindi, served as Century 21's chief operating officer.

The Century 21 flagship location is at 22 Cortlandt Street in Lower Manhattan, New York City, New York, United States of America, a site of the former East River Savings Bank (eventually merged into Marine Midland Bank and today into KeyBank). It occupies the base of a 34-story office tower, and it has recently added a Financier Patisserie coffee shop to its third floor. The store became an emotional flashpoint during and after the September 11 attacks. The store was evacuated after the first plane hit the World Trade Center, and the interior was significantly damaged from the collapse of the Twin Towers. Initially, it was not certain that the store would be rebuilt, but the owners opted to remain at the same site and the store was renovated and reopened on February 28, 2002, five months after the attacks. Thousands of people waited hours on the morning of the reopening so they could have a sales receipt from that day.

The firm opened its first location outside of the greater New York metropolitan area in October 2014, housed on two floors of the former Strawbridge's flagship on Market Street in Center City, Philadelphia.

The company expanded in 2016, opening at Sawgrass Mills in Sunrise, Florida.

In March 2016, Century 21 announced that it would open a location at American Dream. This location never opened due to a later insolvency, and was replaced by The ADdress. In 2017, Century 21 opened a location at Cross County Center in Yonkers, New York. In April 2018, the company opened a Century 21 EDITION pop-up store at the Staten Island Mall, focusing on high-end women's accessories. In July 2019, Century 21 announced plans to open a new location at the Roosevelt Field Mall in Garden City, New York in 2021. In February 2020, Century 21 announced plans to open a permanent location at the Staten Island Mall, taking over the lower level of the former Sears Store.

On Thursday September 10, 2020, Century 21 filed for Chapter 11 bankruptcy, after failing to secure insurance recoveries for the COVID-19 pandemic. Century 21 closed all of its locations by Sunday, December 6, 2020.

On February 25, 2021, Century 21 announced it would resume operations sometime in 2021.

In 2022, Century 21 surrendered its original Bay Ridge location.

In May 2022, Century 21 announced it would reopen the lower Manhattan store in the spring of 2023.

In February 2023, Century 21 announced an April 2023 reopening date for the downtown New York City flagship. It also announced plans for a new Bay Ridge store at a shopping center developed by the Gindi's, with more locations planned for both the United States and internationally.

Although the New York City flagship was scheduled to reopen on April 25, 2023, the opening was delayed until May 16, 2023.
