= Sonny Gindi =

American businessman (1924–2012)

- Born: Samuel I. Gindi; 1924
- Died: 2012 (aged 87–88)
- Other name: Sonny
- Occupation: businessman
- Known for: founder of Century 21 department store
- Spouse: Irene Tawil
- Children: Isaac S. Gindi; Eddie Gindi; Jacob Gindi “Jack” Rachelle Gindi

Samuel "Sonny" Gindi (1924–2012) was the co-founder of the Century 21 department store. He had an estimated net worth of $6 billion.

== Biography ==
Gindi was born in Brooklyn, New York to a Sephardic Jewish family of Syrian Jewish origin. His father died when he was nine. At the age of 14, he opened his first retail store and in the 1950s, he opened a children's clothing store. In 1959, leveraging his retail experience, he partnered with Alfred Sutton and Morris Sutton, he opened the Lolly Togs children's wear business which was the first importer to do business with Hong Kong. Lolly Togs changed its name to the LT Apparel Group in 2007. In 1961, he partnered with fellow Sephardic community member and cousin Al Gindi and opened the Century 21 department store on Cortlandt Street in lower Manhattan. At the time of his death, Century 21 had expanded throughout the New York metropolitan area with locations in Westbury, New York, Rego Park, Queens, the Upper West Side of Manhattan, Morristown, New Jersey, Paramus, New Jersey, and on Fulton Street in Brooklyn. Al Gindi's son, Raymond Gindi, serves as Century 21's chief operating officer while Sonny Gindi's son, Isaac Gindi serves as its chief executive officer and his son Eddie Gindi, its executive vice president.

== Personal life and philanthropy ==
Gindi was married to Irene Tawil with whom he had four children: Isaac Gindi, Eddie Gindi, Jacob Gindi “Jack” , and Rachelle Gindi. Gindi was a supporter of the United Jewish Appeal and the International Sephardic Education Fund (ISEF) dedicated to “narrow(ing) Israel’s socio-economic gap through higher education for gifted students from disadvantaged backgrounds.” Gindi was a member of the Sha'are Zion synagogue and served on the synagogue's founding committee for several decades. He also served as president of the Magen David Yeshivah from 1970–1972. The Al & Sonny Gindi Scholarship Fund is named in his honor as is the Al and Sonny Gindi Barkai Yeshivah in Brooklyn.
