= List of tallest buildings in Brooklyn =

Skyline of Brooklyn
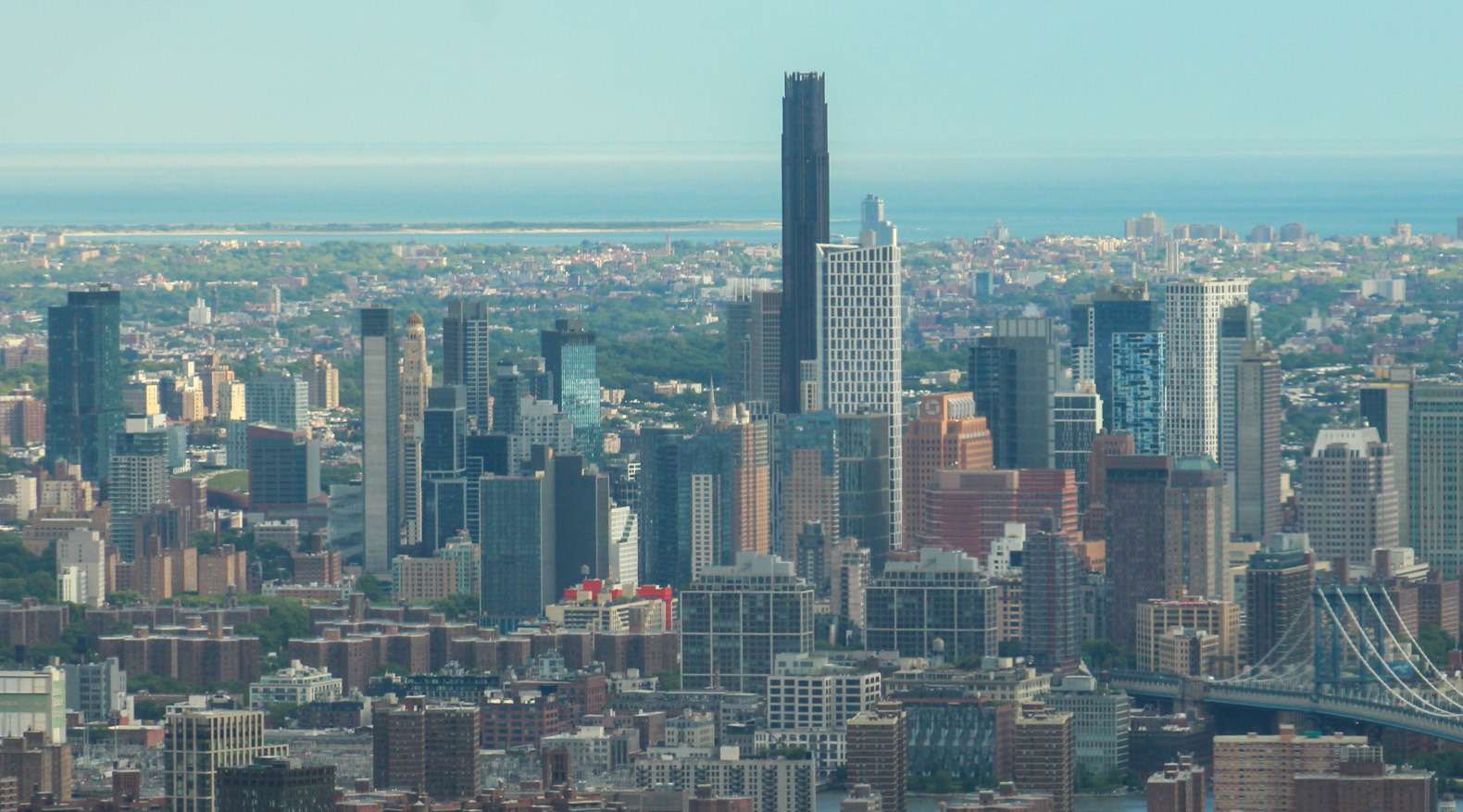
- Downtown Brooklyn in 2025
- Tallest building: Brooklyn Tower (2023)
- Tallest building height: 1,035 ft (315.3 m)
- First 150 m+ building: Williamsburgh Savings Bank Tower (1929)

Number of tall buildings (2026)
- Taller than 100 m (328 ft): 72
- Taller than 150 m (492 ft): 17
- Taller than 200 m (656 ft): 2
- Taller than 300 m (984 ft): 1

Number of tall buildings — feet
- Taller than 300 ft (91.4 m): 84

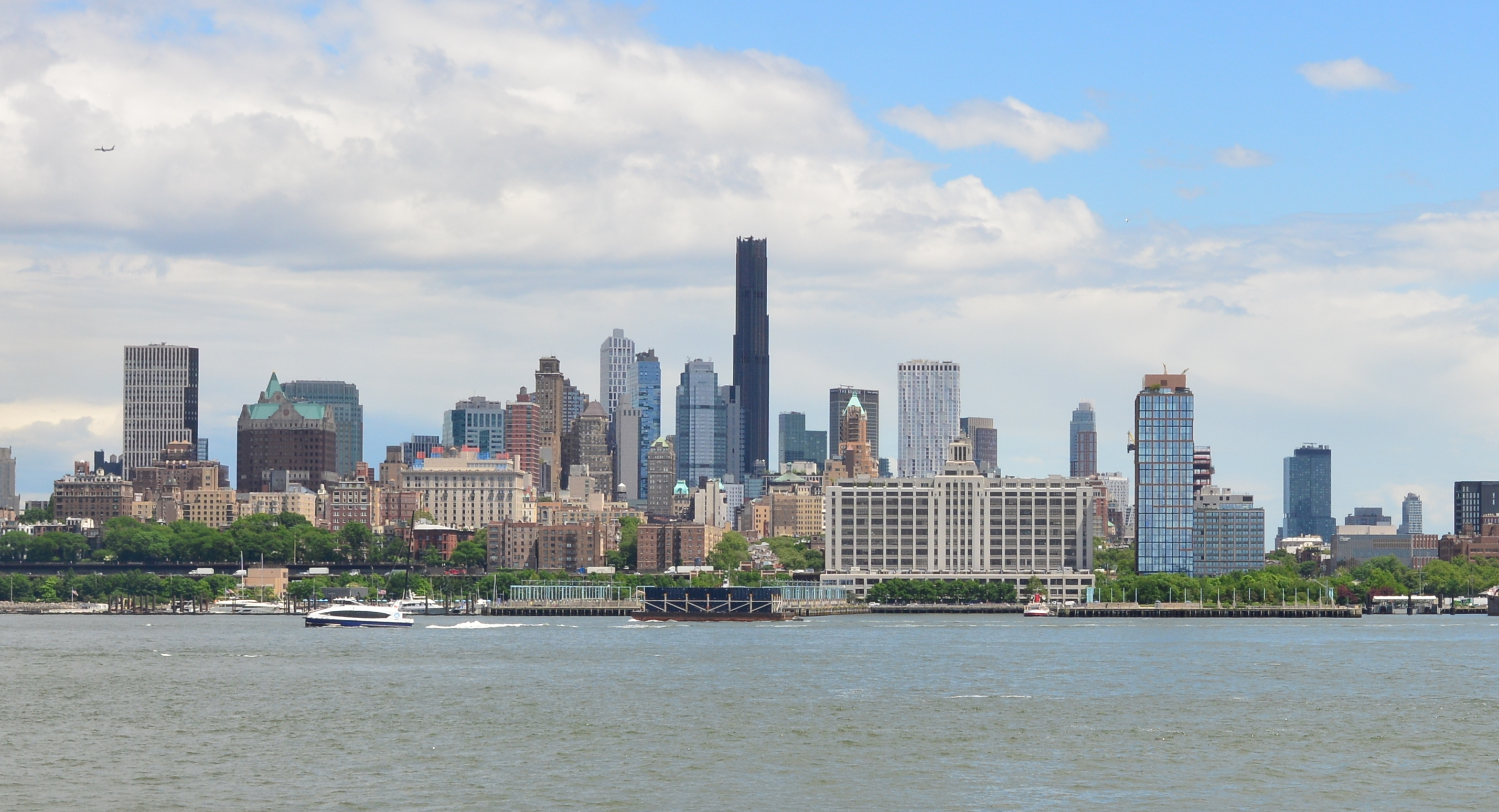
Downtown Brooklyn from the Staten Island Ferry in 2026

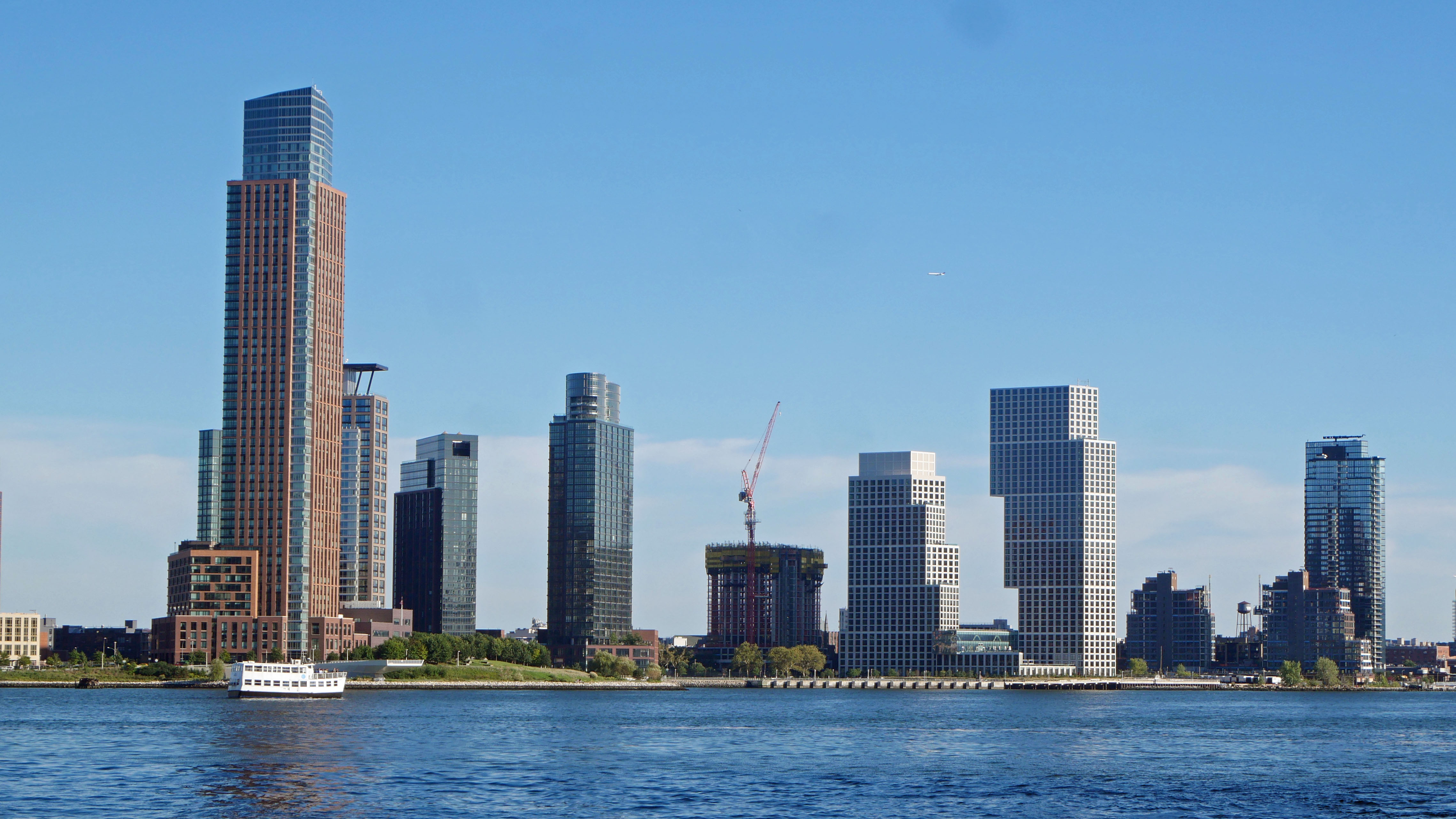
Greenpoint Landing in 2023

Brooklyn, the most populous of New York City's five boroughs, is home to 84 high-rise buildings that stand taller than 300 feet (91 m), 17 of which are skyscrapers taller than 492 ft (150 m) as of 2026. Brooklyn has the second most skyscrapers of the five boroughs of New York City, after Manhattan. Brooklyn's skyline has undergone significant transformation in the 21st century, especially since the 2010s; all fifteen of Brooklyn's tallest buildings were built after 2009. The Brooklyn Tower, a condominium and rental tower in Downtown Brooklyn, has been the borough's tallest building at 1,035 feet (315 m) following its topping out in October 2021. The building was later completed in 2023. The Brooklyn Tower is the borough's sole supertall skyscraper and the tallest building in New York City outside of Manhattan.

The development of high-rise buildings in Brooklyn began during the late 19th century with the 1891 construction of Brooklyn's first high-rise, the 10-story Franklin Trust Company Building. The Zoning Resolution of 1916 influenced the construction of taller, more slender buildings in Brooklyn, as it did in neighboring Manhattan. The 1920s brought about a building boom centered on Court and Montague Streets, with notable office skyscrapers such as 75 Livingston Street, the Chamber of Commerce Building, and the Montague–Court Building. The Great Depression brought an end to Brooklyn's skyscraper boom. The Williamsburgh Savings Bank Tower, one of the last skyscrapers to be built during the boom, was completed in 1929 at a height of 512 ft (156 m), and would remain the tallest building in Brooklyn for 80 years. In the mid-20th century, several high-rise residential projects were built near Downtown Brooklyn, including as Farragut Houses, Concord Village, and the Atlantic Terminal Houses.

Downtown Brooklyn saw large-scale development in the 1980s and 1990s with the MetroTech Center (now Brooklyn Commons), a 16-acre (65,000 m^{2}) complex of several office towers. In 2004, parts of Downtown Brooklyn were rezoned to allow for denser residential development. This has led to a major skyscraper boom in Brooklyn, which intensified during the 2010s. In 2010, The Brooklyner, with a height of 531 ft (162 m), surpassed the Williamsburgh Savings Bank Tower to be the borough's tallest building. The record was soon superseded four more times, first by 388 Bridge Street in 2014, AVA DoBro in 2015, Brooklyn Point in 2019, and finally by the Brooklyn Tower in 2023. The skyscraper boom in downtown has also spread eastwards to Fort Greene.

In addition to Downtown Brooklyn, significant skyscraper development has occurred in Greenpoint and Williamsburg, along the East River waterfront. 175 blocks in the two neighborhoods were rezoned in 2005. The redevelopment of the Domino Sugar Refinery in Williamsburg enabled the construction of One South First in 2019, followed by the two-tower One Domino Square in 2024. The 22-acre Greenpoint Landing development, transforming an industrial waterfront into a mixed-income community, is planned to have over ten high-rises. Following a 2021 rezoning and the cleaning of the Gowanus Canal, the neighborhood of Gowanus is also undergoing a residential high-rise boom.

== History ==
Number of buildings by height in Brooklyn by the end of each year, based on the information in this article. Click on the legend to toggle a specific height on or off. View chart definition.

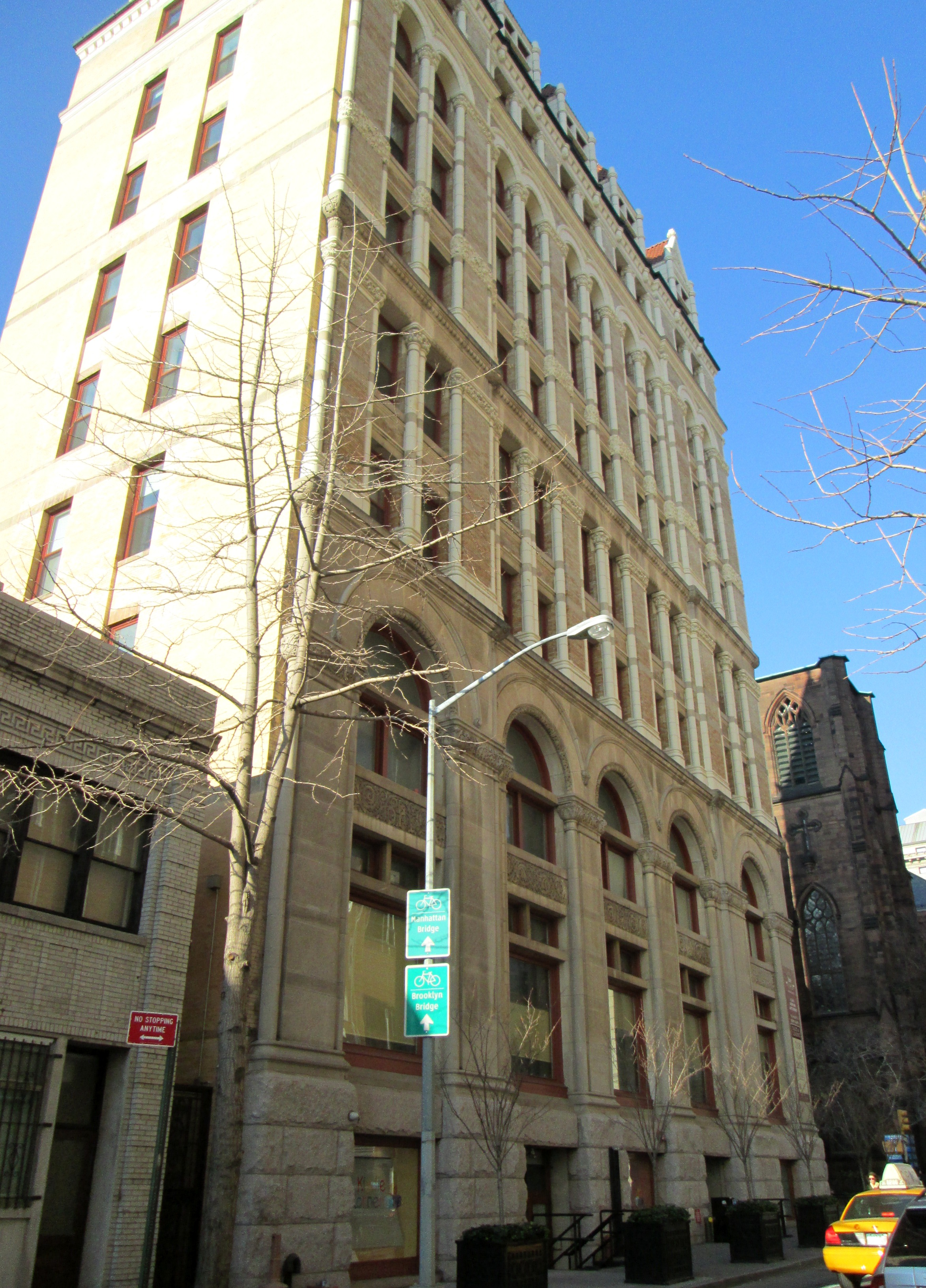
Franklin Trust Company Building is considered Brooklyn's first skyscraper.

The construction of high-rise buildings in Brooklyn began during the late 19th century, following the completion of the Brooklyn Bridge in 1883 and the building of elevated railroads and streetcar lines during the late 1880s. Increased accessibility to Downtown Brooklyn brought greater economic growth and propagated denser commercial development, which increased the heights of downtown buildings throughout the 1890s. This led to the 1891 construction of Brooklyn's first skyscraper, the 10-story Franklin Trust Company Building. By 1901, the 13-story Temple Bar Building was completed and was the borough's first steel-beam high-rise, its largest office building, and its tallest at 164 feet (50 m). In the early 20th-century, the opening of multiple New York City Subway lines in Downtown Brooklyn spurred further development of tall commercial buildings. The Zoning Resolution of 1916, which required buildings to incorporate setbacks from the street to allow for sunlight, influenced the construction of taller, more slender buildings.

In 1918, the 22-story and 220-foot (67 m) building at 32 Court Street was completed and regarded as Brooklyn's first "true skyscraper", and thus initiated a skyscraper building boom in Brooklyn centered on Court and Montague Streets. Brooklyn's high-rise development continued unabated into the 1920s. The Court and Remsen Building, built in 1926 at 350 feet (107 m) in height, was the first of the major high-rises to be built in Brooklyn during the 1920s and briefly held the title of Brooklyn's tallest building until 1927, when the Montague–Court Building was completed and became Brooklyn's tallest building at 462 feet (141 m). Brooklyn's skyscraper building boom ceased during the Great Depression, and the Williamsburgh Savings Bank Tower in Fort Greene, which was completed in 1929, remained Brooklyn's tallest building until 2009.

In 2004, several portions of Downtown Brooklyn were rezoned to promote more commercial, residential, and retail development. This rezoning allowed for greater density of development, and combined with an increased demand for housing, these areas experienced a boom in the construction of tall buildings. In addition to Downtown Brooklyn, high-rise buildings are also concentrated in the Brooklyn Heights, Fort Greene, and Williamsburg neighborhoods, although other Brooklyn neighborhoods have significant numbers of high-rises. In 2019, One South First, situated on the Domino Park waterfront, became Williamsburg's tallest tower at 435 feet. The Brooklyn Tower which rises to a height of 1,066 feet in Downtown Brooklyn, became the tallest building in the New York City area outside of Manhattan, and the tallest building on Long Island.

== Map of tallest buildings ==
The map below displays the location of buildings taller than 300 ft (91 m) in Downtown Brooklyn. Buildings outside the scope of the map, such as those in Williamsburg and Greenpoint, are marked with an asterisk. Each marker is numbered by the building's height rank, and coloured by the decade of its completion.

Buildings taller than 300 ft (91 m) in Downtown Brooklyn. An asterisk (*) next to the building's name indicates it is located outside the map.
- 1950s and before
- 1960s
- 1970s
- 1980s
- 1990s
- 2000s
- 2010s
- 2020s
1 Brooklyn Tower
2 Brooklyn Point
3 AVA DoBro
4 11 Hoyt
5 The Everly
6 The Brook
7 The Hub
8 388 Bridge Street
9 One Domino Square Rental*
10 The Ashland
11 One Willoughby Square
12 The Paxton
13 Brooklyn Crossing
14 The Brooklyner
15 City Point Tower II
16 Williamsburgh Savings Bank Tower
17 625 Fulton Street
18 505 State Street
19 12 Metrotech Center
20 One Domino Square Condominium*
21 Hanover House
22 Montague–Court Building
23 66 Rockwell Place
24 Two Blue Slip*
25 West Wharf*
26 Level BK*
27 Eagle + West Tower 1*
28 111 Willoughby Street
29 One South First*
30 The Greenpoint*
31 BKLYN Air
32 4 Metrotech Center
33 Tower 77 North*
34 Toren
35 The Willoughby
36 The Amberly
37 1 Metrotech Center
38 1 Clinton Street
39 The Riverie - South Tower*
40 DKLB BKLN
41 One Pierrepont Plaza
42 Olympia DUMBO
43 Oro
44 The Dupont*
45 75 Livingston Street
46 Brooklyn Renaissance Plaza
47 1 North 4th Place*
48 Avalon Fort Greene
49 Jehovah's Witnesses Dormitory
50 55 Willoughby Street
51 1 Bell Slip*
52 300 Ashland
53 City Point Tower I
54 141 Willoughby Street
55 461 Dean
56 DWTN BK
57 Verdant Fort Greene
58 Chamber of Commerce Building
59 The Shoreline*
60 BellTel Lofts
61 Eighty Nine DeKalb
62 The Eagle
63 The Aqualina New York*
64 Eagle + West Tower 2*
65 Tivoli Towers*
66 One Blue Slip*
67 J Condominium
68 The Axel
69 200 Cadman Plaza
70 180 Montague Street
71 Tower 77 South*
72 Two Northside Piers*
73 Brooklyn Commons - 115 Myrtle Avenue
74 The Fleet
75 The Brooklyn Grove
76 St. George Hotel
77 Quay Tower
78 Plank Road
79 111 Livingston Street
80 The Azure
81 Atlantic Terminal Site 4B
82 Towers of Bay Ridge West*
83 One Nine Rockwell
84 The Addison

== Cityscape ==
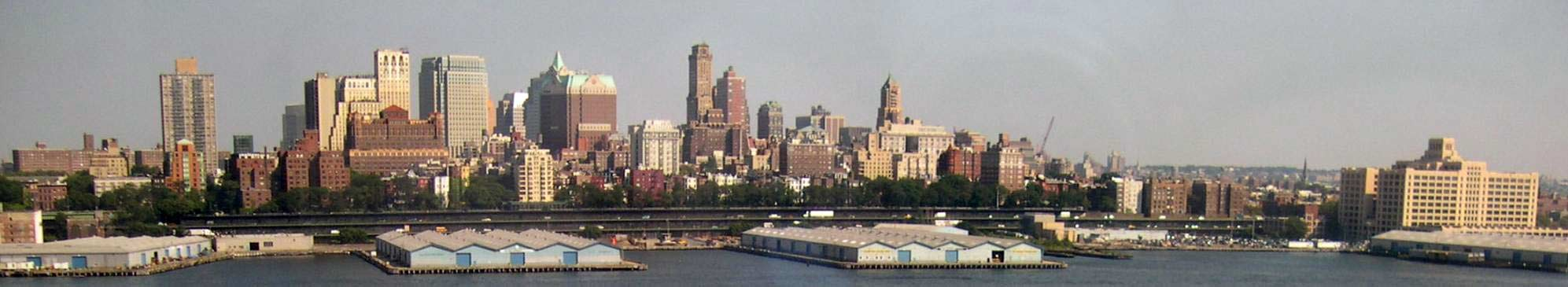
Panoramic view of the Downtown Brooklyn skyline in 2005, before the residential skyscraper boom

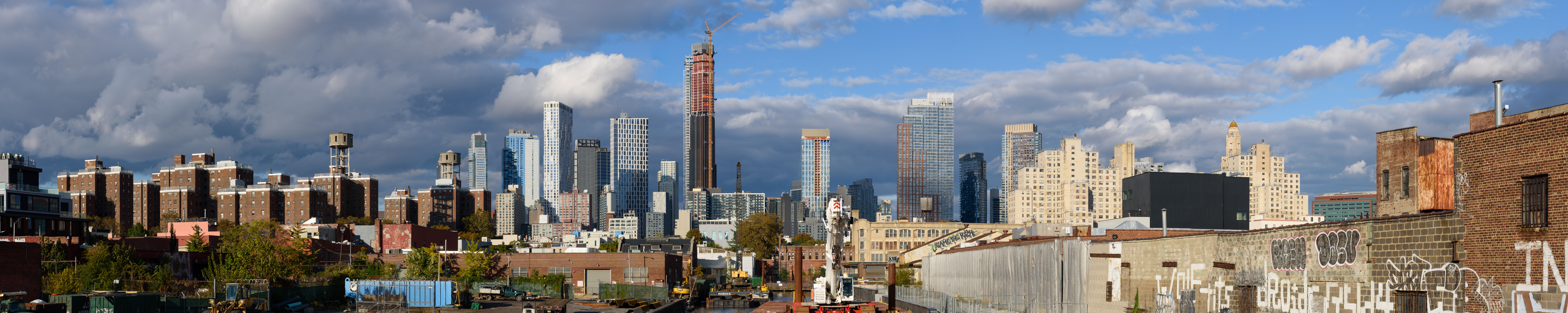
Downtown Brooklyn as viewed from Union Street Bridge in Gowanus in 2021

== Tallest buildings ==
This list ranks completed buildings in Brooklyn that stand at least 300 ft (91 m) tall as of 2026, based on standard height measurement. This includes spires and architectural details but does not include antenna masts. The “Year” column indicates the year of completion. Buildings tied in height are sorted by year of completion with earlier buildings ranked first, and then alphabetically.

Was the tallest building in Brooklyn upon completion

Rank	Name	Image	Location	Height ft (m)	Floors	Year	Purpose	Notes
1	Brooklyn Tower		40°41′26″N 73°58′56″W	1,035 (315)	74	2023	Residential	Tallest building in Brooklyn. Tallest building in New York City outside of Manhattan. Tallest building in Brooklyn completed in the 2020s. Foremrly known as 9 DeKalb Avenue.
2	Brooklyn Point	A view of City Point looking west from Flatbush Avenue	40°41′31″N 73°58′59″W	723 (220.3)	57	2019	Residential	Tallest building in Brooklyn from 2019 to 2022. Tallest building in Brooklyn completed in the 2010s. Also known as 138 Willoughby Street, 1 City Point, and City Point Tower III. Part of the City Point development.
3	AVA DoBro		40°41′31″N 73°59′05″W	624 (190.2)	58	2015	Residential	Tallest building in Brooklyn from 2015 to 2019. Also known as 100 Willoughby Street, 214 Duffield Street, and Avalon Willoughby Square, of which AVA DoBro is short for.
4	11 Hoyt	11 Hoyt Street	40°41′23″N 73°59′06″W	618 (188.4)	54	2021	Residential	A redevelopment of Macy's former footprint in Downtown Brooklyn. Designed by Studio Gang, the building features a scalloped façade and projecting bay windows in a similar manner to 8 Spruce, a skyscraper in Manhattan.
5	The Everly		40°41′22″N 73°58′44″W	610 (185.9)	49	2025	Residential	Also known as 98 Dekalb Avenue and 180 Ashland Place.
6	The Brook		40°41′22″N 73°58′54″W	603 (183.8)	51	2025	Residential	Also known as 589 Fulton Street.
7	The Hub	A view of The Hub looking west from Flatbush Avenue	40°41′14″N 73°58′52″W	602 (183.6)	54	2016	Residential	Also known as 333 Schermerhorn Street.
8	388 Bridge Street		40°41′30″N 73°59′08″W	590 (179.8)	51	2014	Residential	Tallest building in Brooklyn briefly from 2014 to 2015.
9	One Domino Square Rental		40°42′46″N 73°58′04″W	574 (175)	57	2024	Residential	Also known as 346 Kent Avenue Tower I. The building is shown on the right of the image, and is the taller of the two skyscrapers in One Domino Square. Part of the Domino Sugar Factory redevelopment.
10	The Ashland	250 Ashland Place	40°41′16″N 73°58′44″W	568 (173.1)	52	2016	Residential	Also known as 590 Fulton Street and 250 Ashland Place.
11	One Willoughby Square	1 Willoughby Square	40°41′28″N 73°59′02″W	552 (168.3)	34	2021	Office	Tallest office building in Brooklyn.
12	The Paxton	The Paxton	40°41′20″N 73°58′54″W	535 (163.1)	43	2023	Mixed-use	Mixed-use residential and office building. Tallest mixed-use building in Brooklyn. Also Known as 540 Fulton Street.
13	Brooklyn Crossing		40°40′58″N 73°58′27″W	532 (162.1)	51	2022	Residential	Also known as 18 Sixth Avenue or the Pacific Park B4 Tower.
14	The Brooklyner	A view of The Brooklyner's side elevation from street level	40°41′34″N 73°59′10″W	531 (162)	52	2010	Residential	Tallest building in Brooklyn between 2009 and 2013.
15	City Point Tower II	City Point Tower II, a high-rise clad in light-toned stone and dark-toned glass in irregular patterns, viewed from street level	40°41′28″N 73°58′57″W	515 (157.1)	46	2016	Residential	Also known as City Tower, 10 City Point, and 336 Flatbush Avenue Extension. Part of the City Point development.
16	Williamsburgh Savings Bank Tower	Williamsburgh Savings Bank Tower, a limestone art-deco high-rise building, viewed from street level	40°41′08″N 73°58′40″W	512 (156.1)	42	1929	Residential	Tallest building in Brooklyn completed in the 20th century. Tallest building in Brooklyn from 1929 to 2009. Also known as One Hanson Place. Built as the headquarters of Williamsburgh Savings Bank. The bank was eventually merged into HSBC Bank USA, who sold the skyscraper in 2004. The building's upper stories were converted to luxury condominium apartments from 2005 to 2007, while the banking hall became an event space.
17	625 Fulton Street		40°41′21″N 73°58′48″W	500 (152.4)	35	2024	Residential	The building was initially proposed as 79 storey, 941 ft (287 m) tall skyscraper designed by SOM. Plans for the building were downsized in 2021.
18	505 State Street	505 State Street	40°41′09″N 73°58′45″W	482 (146.9)	44	2024	Residential	Phase 1 of The Alloy Block development. Also known as 100 Flatbush.
19	12 Metrotech Center	12 Metrotech Center, a high-rise clad in a façade of stone and limestone, viewed from street level	40°41′41″N 73°59′16″W	473 (144.2)	32	2005	Government	Also known as the Kings County Supreme and Family Courthouse. Second tallest building in Brooklyn at the time of completion. Since 2021, the building has hosted the Division of Child Protection Brooklyn West. Tallest building in Brooklyn completed in the 2000s.
20	One Domino Square Condominium		40°42′48″N 73°58′05″W	472 (143.9)	39	2024	Residential	Also known as 346 Kent Avenue Tower I. The building is shown on the left of the image, and is the shorter of the two skyscrapers in One Domino Square. Part of the Domino Sugar Factory redevelopment.
21	Hanover House	—	40°41′19″N 73°58′56″W	463 (141.1)	34	2024	Residential	Also known as 15 Hanover Place.
22	Montague–Court Building	Montague–Court Building, a high-rise building clad in stone, viewed from street level	40°41′37″N 73°59′27″W	462 (140.8)	35	1927	Office	Tallest building in Brooklyn between 1927 and 1929. Also known as 16 Court Street. In 2012, the New York City Landmarks Preservation Commission designated the building as part of the Borough Hall Skyscraper Historic District.
23	66 Rockwell Place	66 Rockwell Place, a high-rise clad in a façade of blue glass, viewed from street level	40°41′17″N 73°58′46″W	457 (139.3)	42	2014	Residential	Formerly known as 29 Flatbush.
24	Two Blue Slip		40°44′11″N 73°57′35″W	440 (134.1)	39	2020	Residential	Also known as 41 Blue Slip. Part of the Greenpoint Landing development.
25	West Wharf		40°43′37″N 73°57′37″W	439 (133.8)	40	2022	Residential	Also known as 65 Private Drive, Calyer Place Tower I, and 60 Wharf Drive.
26	Level BK	Level BK	40°43′15″N 73°57′48″W	438 (133.5)	40	2017	Residential	Also known as 2 North 6th Place. Level BK is shown in the photo on the right.
27	Eagle + West Tower 1	Eagle + West Tower 1	40°44′05″N 73°57′40″W	438 (133.5)	39	2022	Residential	Part of the Eagle + West complex and the Greenpoint Landing development. Informally known as the Tetris buildings.
28	111 Willoughby Street		40°41′32″N 73°59′05″W	437 (133.2)	40	2025	Residential	
29	One South First		40°42′58″N 73°58′00″W	435 (132.6)	42	2019	Residential	The skyscraper is the second structure to be developed as part of the Domino Sugar Factory redevelopment plan.
30	The Greenpoint		40°43′56″N 73°57′40″W	434 (132.2)	39	2018	Residential	Also known as 10 Huron and 21 India Street.
31	BKLYN Air	BKLYN AIR, a high-rise building with curved steel and glass corners, viewed on the right from a distance along an avenue	40°41′42″N 73°58′58″W	432 (131.7)	39	2014	Residential	Also known as Oro 2 Condominium.
32	4 Metrotech Center		40°41′34″N 73°59′02″W	429 (130.8)	25	1993	Office	Part of the MetroTech Center development. Also known as the Chase Building or the Chase Manhattan Bank Building. The logo of Chase Bank is displayed on the exterior of the building. Tallest building completed in Brooklyn in the 1990s.
33	Tower 77 North		40°44′18″N 73°57′26″W	429 (130.8)	41	2023	Residential	Also known as 77-87 Commercial Street.
34	Toren	Toren, a high-rise clad in multiple of colors of glass in irregular patterns, viewed from street level	40°41′36″N 73°58′58″W	427 (130.3)	37	2009	Residential	
35	The Willoughby		40°41′29″N 73°58′48″W	426 (129.8)	34	2021	Residential	Also known as 196 Willoughby Street.
36	The Amberly		40°41′53″N 73°59′11″W	425 (129.5)	34	2018	Residential	Also known as 120 Nassau Street and Jay Street Residences.
37	1 Metrotech Center	1 Metrotech Center, a high-rise clad in light-toned stone, viewed from street level	40°41′36″N 73°59′12″W	411 (125.4)	23	1992	Office	Also known as Brooklyn Commons - 351 Jay Street, the Keyspan Building, and the Bear Stearns Building.
38	1 Clinton Street		40°41′45″N 73°59′29″W	409 (124.7)	36	2022	Residential	Stylized as One Clinton. Also known as 280 Cadman Plaza West. Replaces a branch of the Brooklyn Public Library.
39	The Riverie - South Tower	1 Java Street	40°43′52″N 73°57′39″W	408 (124.3)	37	2026	Residential	Also known as 1 Java Street South Tower.
40	DKLB BKLN	DKLB BKLN, a high-rise clad in stone and blue glass with curved corners, viewed from street level	40°41′23″N 73°58′48″W	405 (123.5)	34	2010	Residential	Also known as 80 DeKalb Avenue.
41	One Pierrepont Plaza	One Pierrepont Plaza	40°41′43″N 73°59′29″W	400 (122)	21	1988	Office	Tallest building in Brooklyn completed in the 1980s.
42	Olympia DUMBO	Olympia DUMBO	40°42′08″N 73°59′26″W	400 (122)	29	2024	Residential	Also known as 30 Front Street. Notable for its sail-like shape.
43	Oro	Oro, a high-rise clad in stone and blue glass with curved corners, viewed from street level	40°41′42″N 73°59′01″W	400 (121.9)	40	2008	Residential	
44	The Dupont		40°44′07″N 73°57′35″W	400 (121.9)	40	2025	Residential	Also known as 16 DuPont Street.
45	75 Livingston Street		40°41′31″N 73°59′30″W	399 (121.6)	32	1926	Residential	Tallest building in Brooklyn from 1926 to 1927. Also known as the Court Chambers Building and the Brooklyn Chamber of Commerce Building. Originally constructed as an office tower, the building was converted into cooperative apartments in 1981.
46	Brooklyn Renaissance Plaza	Brooklyn Renaissance Plaza	40°41′37″N 73°59′17″W	398 (121.3)	32	1997	Office	Also known as the New York Marriott at the Brooklyn Bridge.
47	1 North 4th Place	1 North 4th Place, a high-rise clad in blue glass, viewed from street level	40°43′11″N 73°57′54″W	398 (121.3)	41	2015	Residential	Also known as Three Northside Piers, 1N4th, and One North Fourth.
48	Avalon Fort Greene	Avalon Fort Greene Condominium	40°41′39″N 73°58′58″W	393 (119.8)	41	2010	Residential	
49	Jehovah's Witnesses Dormitory	Jehovah's Witnesses Dormitory	40°41′58″N 73°59′14″W	378 (115.2)	30	1995	Residential	The building is a residential dormitory for members of Jehovah's Witnesses.
50	55 Willoughby Street	—	40°41′33″N 73°59′13″W	376 (114.6)	38	2026	Residential	Also known as House55.
51	1 Bell Slip		40°44′15″N 73°57′31″W	369 (112.5)	31	2022	Residential	Also known as The Bellslip.
52	300 Ashland	286 Ashland Place	40°41′11″N 73°58′42″W	364 (110.9)	32	2016	Residential	Also known as Brooklyn Academy of Music South (BAM South) and 286 Ashland Place.
53	City Point Tower I		40°41′26″N 73°58′59″W	361 (110)	27	2015	Residential	Also known as 7 DeKalb Avenue, and 70 Fleet Street. Part of the City Point development.
54	141 Willoughby Street		40°41′33″N 73°58′59″W	360 (109.7)	23	2022	Residential	Former site of the Institute of Design and Construction.
55	461 Dean		40°40′55″N 73°58′31″W	359 (109.4)	32	2016	Residential	Part of Pacific Park.
56	DWTN BK	—	40°41′43″N 73°58′55″W	356 (108.5)	31	2025	Residential	Also known as 71 Prince Street and 202-208 Tillary Street.
57	Verdant Fort Greene	—	40°41′29″N 73°58′40″W	353 (108)	30	2024	Residential	Also known as 240 Willoughby Street.
58	Chamber of Commerce Building	Court and Remsen Building, a high-rise clad in stone in a neoclassical architectural style, viewed from street level	40°41′36″N 73°59′28″W	350 (106.7)	30	1926	Residential	Also known as the Court and Remsen Building.
59	The Shoreline		40°35′46″N 73°59′54″W	349 (106.5)	30	2024	Residential	Also known as 2230 Cropsey Avenue.
60	BellTel Lofts		40°41′33″N 73°59′06″W	348 (106.1)	27	1931	Residential	Also known as New York Telephone Building, 101 Willoughby Street, and 7 MetroTech Center. Originally built as the headquarters for the New York Telephone Company. The building was renovated into a residential complex in the mid-2000s.
61	Eighty Nine DeKalb	—	40°41′25″N 73°58′47″W	348 (106.0)	30	2025	Residential	
62	The Eagle	—	40°41′36″N 73°58′56″W	346 (105.5)	32	2018	Residential	
63	The Aqualina New York		40°35′11″N 73°57′13″W	343 (104.5)	28	2017	Residential	Also known as Avalon Brooklyn Bay, 1 Brooklyn Bay, and 1501 Voorhies Avenue.
64	Eagle + West Tower 2		40°44′07″N 73°57′38″W	342 (104.2)	29	2022	Residential	Part of the Eagle + West complex and the Greenpoint Landing development.
65	Tivoli Towers		40°40′04″N 73°57′35″W	341 (104)	33	1974	Residential	Tallest building in Brooklyn completed in the 1970s.
66	One Blue Slip		40°44′12″N 73°57′33″W	340 (103.6)	30	2018	Residential	Also known as 37 Blue Slip.
67	J Condominium	—	40°42′08″N 73°59′13″W	337 (102.7)	31	2007	Residential	
68	The Axel		40°40′56″N 73°58′03″W	337 (102.7)	29	2022	Residential	
69	200 Cadman Plaza		40°41′55″N 73°59′31″W	333 (101.4)	33	1973	Residential	
70	180 Montague Street		40°41′38″N 73°59′31″W	331 (100.9)	33	2000	Residential	Also known as Archstone Brooklyn Heights.
71	Tower 77 South	—	40°44′16″N 73°57′25″W	330 (100.6)	30	2023	Residential	
72	Two Northside Piers	—	40°43′11″N 73°57′51″W	329 (100.3)	30	2009	Residential	
73	Brooklyn Commons - 115 Myrtle Avenue		40°41′38″N 73°59′05″W	325 (99)	21	2003	Office	Also known as 15 Metrotech Center.
74	The Fleet	—	40°41′32″N 73°58′56″W	320 (97.5)	31	2026	Residential	Also known as 283 Flatbush Avenue Extension and 104 Fleet Place.
75	The Brooklyn Grove	—	40°41′19″N 73°58′53″W	318 (96.9)	27	2019	Residential	
76	St. George Hotel	—	40°41′53″N 73°59′39″W	315 (96.0)	30	1930	Hotel	
77	Quay Tower		40°41′34″N 74°00′03″W	315 (96.0)	28	2019	Residential	
78	Plank Road	664 Pacific Street	40°40′55″N 73°58′26″W	314 (96)	27	2022	Residential	Alternately known as 664 Pacific Street, 37 Sixth Avenue, or 495 Dean Street. The building also includes a 616-seat, 69,858-square-foot public middle school, which occupies the first five floors of the building and two floors below street level.
79	111 Livingston Street		40°41′29″N 73°59′23″W	312 (95.1)	22	1969	Mixed-use	Mixed-use residential and office building. Tallest building completed in Brooklyn in the 1960s.
80	The Azure	—	40°41′27″N 73°59′01″W	310 (94.5)	28	2017	Residential	
81	Atlantic Terminal Site 4B		40°40′59″N 73°58′12″W	306 (93.3)	31	1976	Residential	
82	Towers of Bay Ridge West	—	40°38′22″N 74°01′27″W	305 (93)	31	1972	Residential	
83	One Nine Rockwell	—	40°41′21″N 73°58′45″W	304 (92.7)	27	2025	Residential	Also known as 19 Rockwell Place.
84	The Addison	—	40°41′21″N 73°59′06″W	300 (91.4)	25	2009	Residential	Also known as 230 Livingston Street.

== Tallest under construction or proposed ==
=== Under construction ===
The following table includes buildings under construction in Brooklyn that are planned to be at least 300 ft (91 m) tall as of 2026, based on standard height measurement. The “Year” column indicates the expected year of completion. Buildings that are on hold are not included.

Name	Height ft (m)	Floors	Year	Purpose	Notes
One Third Avenue	730 (222.5)	63	2028	Residential	
One Montague Place	672 (205)	47	2029	Residential	Also known as 205 Montague Street.
95 Rockwell Place	617 (188)	53	2029	Residential	
280 Kent Avenue - North Tower	591 (180.1)	50	2030	Residential	
280 Kent Avenue - South Tower	591 (180.1)	50	2030	Residential	
356 Fulton Street	538 (164)	44	2028	Residential	
6208 8th Avenue	345 (105.3)	29	2027	Residential	
Brooklyn Borough Based Jail	337 (102.7)	23	2029	Government	

=== Proposed ===
The following table includes approved and proposed buildings in Brooklyn that are planned to be at least 492 ft (150 m) tall as of 2026, based on standard height measurement.

Name	Height ft (m)	Floors	Year	Purpose	Notes
395 Flatbush Avenue	840 (256)	80	—	Residential	

== Timeline of tallest buildings ==
This lists buildings that once held the title of tallest building in Brooklyn.

Name	Image	Street address	Years as tallest	Height ft (m)	Floors	Notes
Temple Bar Building	Temple Bar Building, a high-rise clad in brown brick, viewed in the background from an adjacent street	44 Court Street	1901–1913	164 (50)	13	
Clock Tower Building		1 Main Street	1913–1918	216 (66)	16	
32 Court Street	32 Court Street, a high-rise clad in brown brick, viewed from street level	32 Court Street	1918–1926	220 (67)	22	
75 Livingston Street		75 Livingston Street	1926–1927	399 (122)	32	
Montague–Court Building	Montague–Court Building, a high-rise building clad in stone, viewed from street level	16 Court Street	1927–1929	462 (141)	35	
Williamsburgh Savings Bank Tower	Williamsburgh Savings Bank Tower, a limestone art-deco high-rise building, viewed from street level	1 Hanson Place	1929–2010	512 (156)	42	
The Brooklyner	Front façade of building looking northeast from Red Hook Lane.	111 Lawrence Street	2010–2013	514 (157)	51	
388 Bridge Street	A street view of the lower level of 388 Bridge Street at nighttime	388 Bridge Street	2013–2015	590 (180)	51	
AVA DoBro	Avalon Willoughby West, a high-rise clad in blue glass, photographed during its construction	214 Duffield Street	2015–2019	624 (190)	58	
Brooklyn Point		138 Willoughby Street	2019–2023	720 (219)	68	
Brooklyn Tower		9 DeKalb Avenue	2023–present	1,035 (315)	73	

== See also ==
- Architecture of New York City
- List of tallest buildings in New York City
- List of tallest buildings in Queens
- List of tallest buildings on Long Island
