= 388 Bridge Street =

Residential skyscraper in Brooklyn, New York

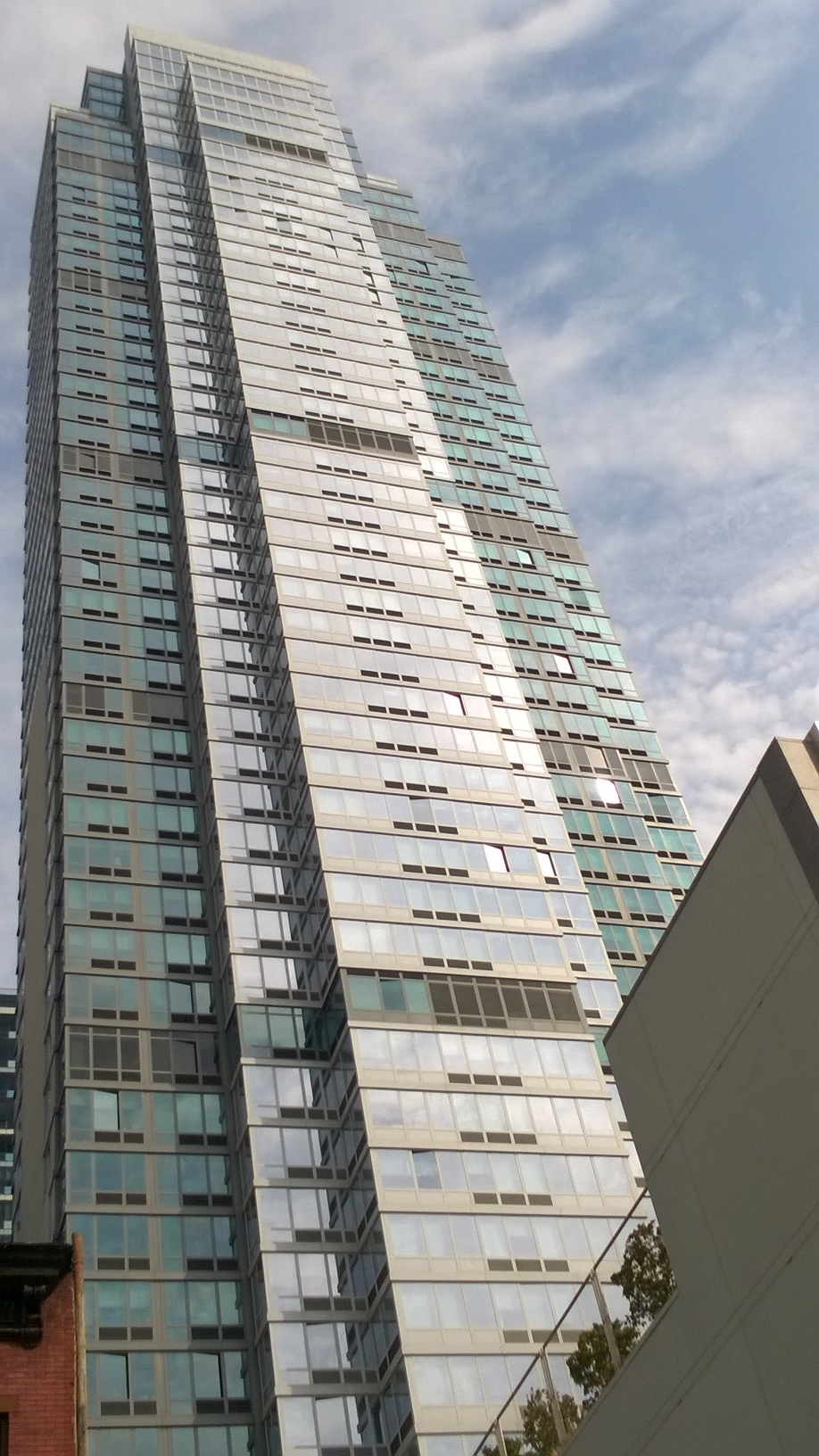

General information
- Status: Completed
- Type: Residential
- Location: 388 Bridge Street, Brooklyn, New York 11201; United States
- Coordinates: 40.691426°N 73.9854°W
- Construction started: 2007; 2012 (post-recession)
- Completed: 2013 (structural)
- Opening: 2014
- Operator: Charles H. Greenthal Management Corp.

Height
- Roof: 179.83 m (590 ft)

Technical details
- Floor count: 54
- Floor area: 461,933 sq ft (42,915.0 m^{2})

Design and construction
- Architect: SLCE Architects
- Developer: Stahl Organization
- Main contractor: Cauldwell Wingate

388 Bridge Street is a 590-foot residential high-rise skyscraper in Downtown Brooklyn, within New York City. It contains 378 market rate units, mixed between 234 rentals and 144 condominiums. The building was originally under construction as an all condominium tower before the 2000s real estate crash and subsequent Great Recession. Construction halted from 2008 to 2012 due to the recession, but resumed in 2013.

When topped out in 2013, it was the tallest building in Brooklyn, passing the four-year-old Brooklyner, until it, too, was passed by AVA DoBro. 388 Bridge Street is now the eighth-tallest in Brooklyn.

== Gallery ==
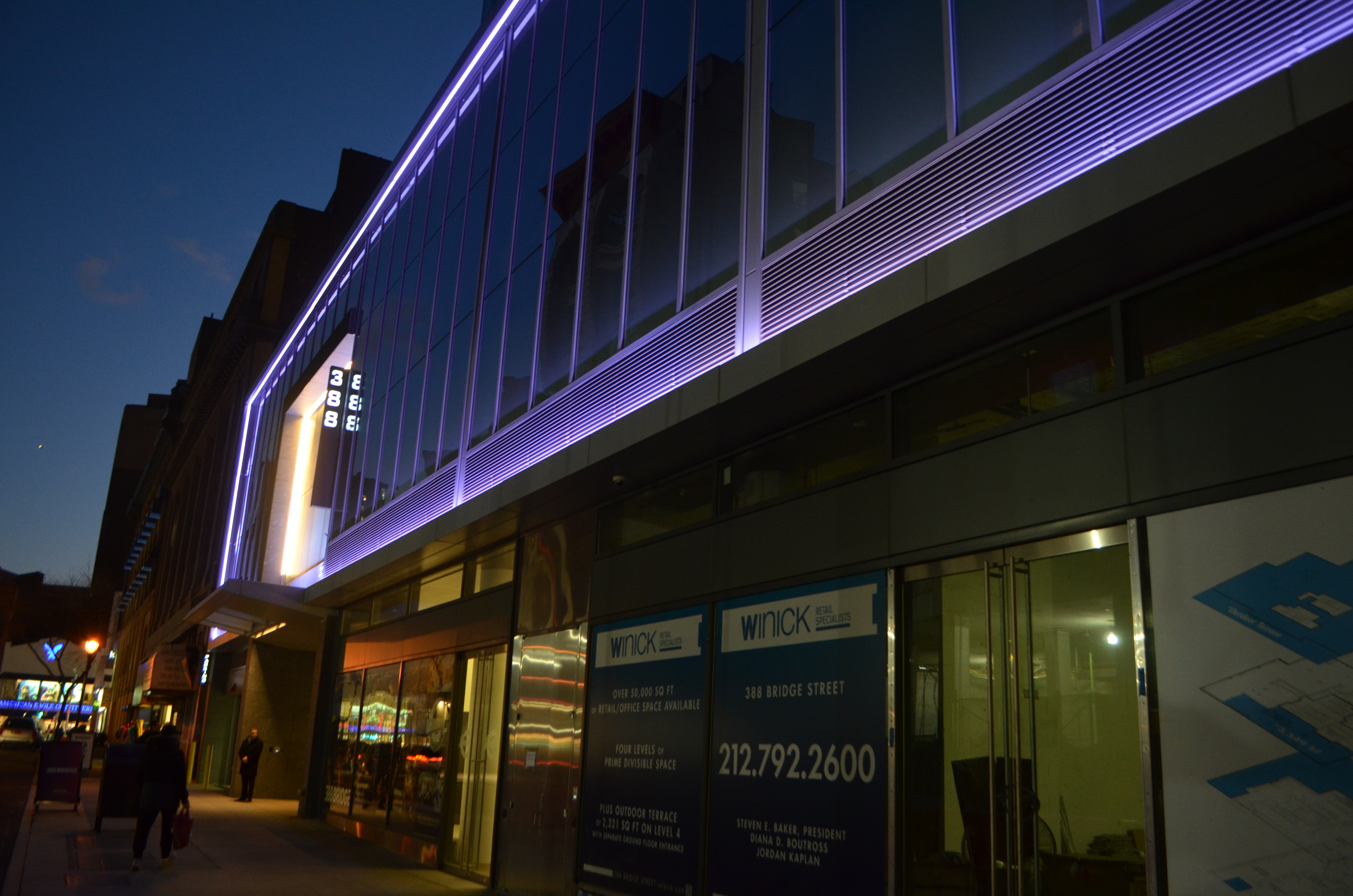
Front entrance for the tower.

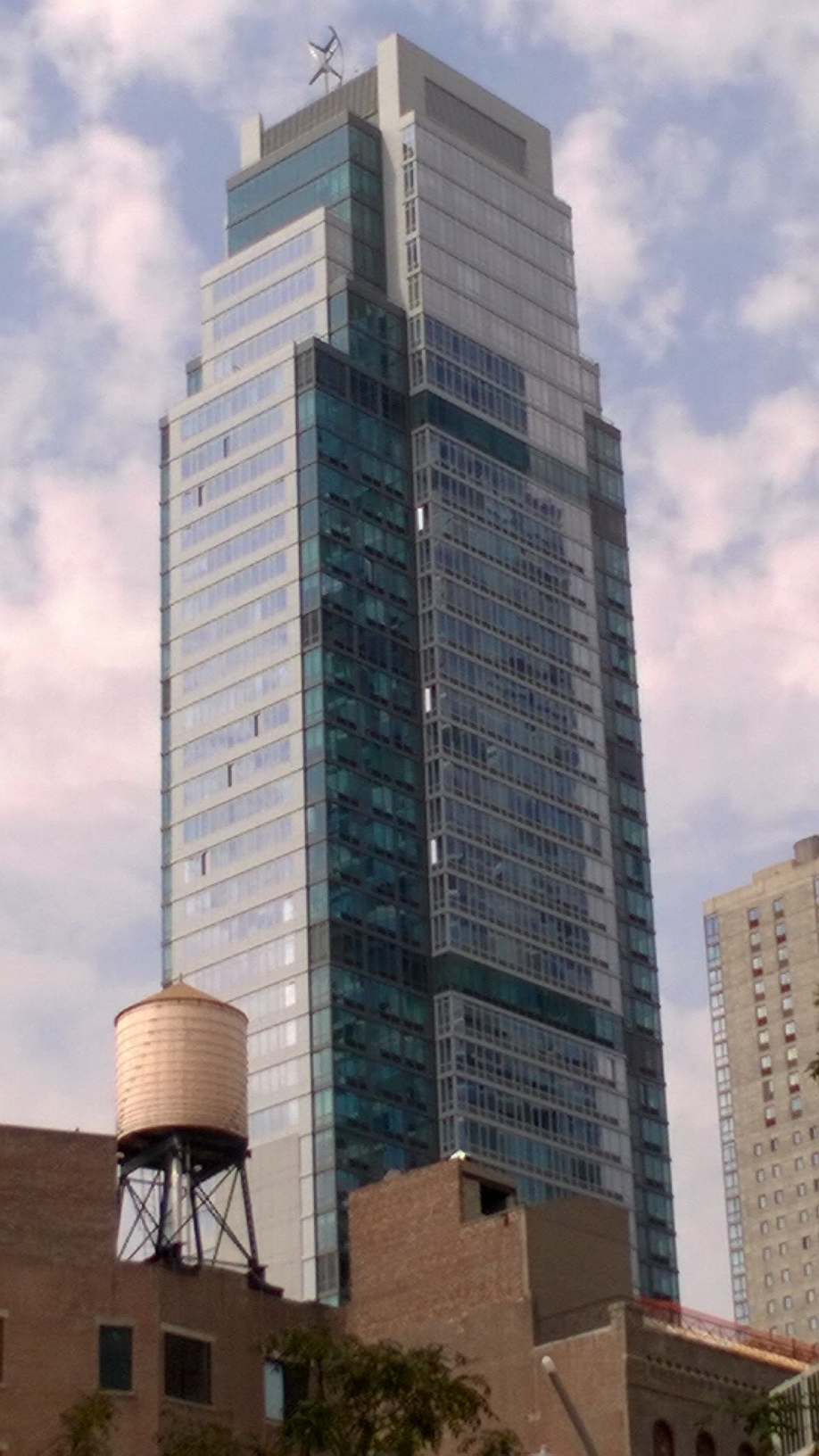
External shot of tower looking north, with one of its distinct wind turbines on the roof.

== See also ==
- List of tallest buildings in Brooklyn
- List of tallest buildings in New York City

Records
Preceded by Brooklyner	Tallest building in Brooklyn; 2013–2015	Succeeded by AVA DoBro
