= The Greenpoint =

Two-building residential complex

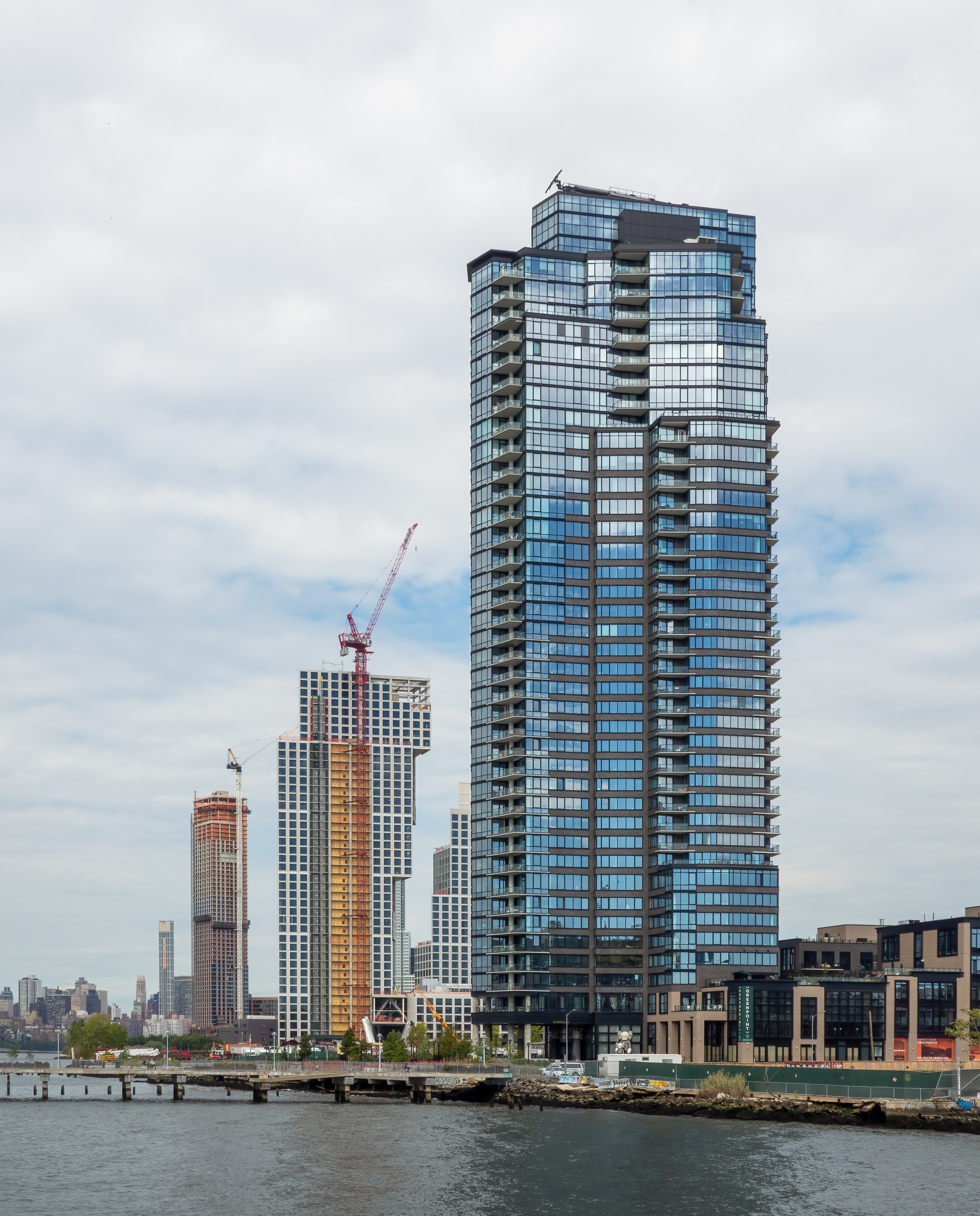
- Viewed from the south in 2021
- Interactive map of the The Greenpoint area

General information
- Status: Topped-out
- Type: Residential
- Coordinates: 40°43′55.4″N 73°57′39.7″W
- Estimated completion: 2018

Height
- Roof: 392 ft (119 m)

Technical details
- Floor count: 39
- Floor area: 454,502 square feet (42,224.6 m^{2})

Design and construction
- Architect: Ismael Levya

The Greenpoint (originally 10 Huron and also known as 21 India Street) is a two-building residential complex in the Greenpoint neighborhood of Brooklyn. The two buildings are a 400 feet (120 m) tower with condos and a block-long five-story building with rentals. It is located next to the Greenpoint ferry stop.

== History ==
Plans for the building were first released in October 2016. The building reached half its full height in November 2016, and topped out in February 2017. The tower was completed in 2018.

== Usage ==
The lower 27 floors of the tower will contain 287 rental units. The remaining floors are dedicated to condo units. The building includes amenities including a parking garage and a courtyard.

== Design ==
The building is split into a tower with 40 floors and a block-long, five-story rental building devoted exclusively to rentals. The tower is massed in a way that is similar to traditional New York skyscrapers, split into base, shaft, and crown.

== Gallery ==
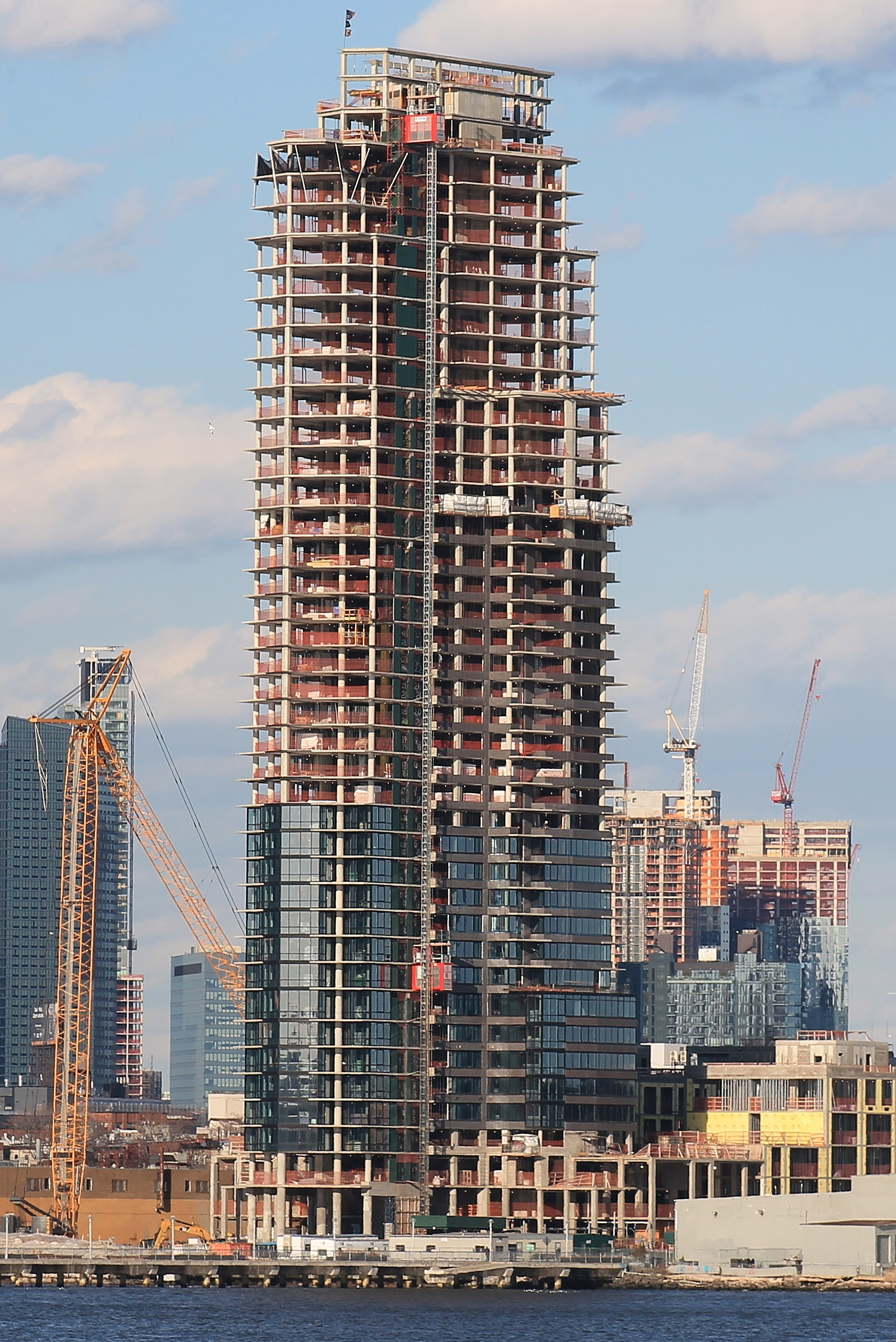
Building under construction in March 2017, viewed from Manhattan.

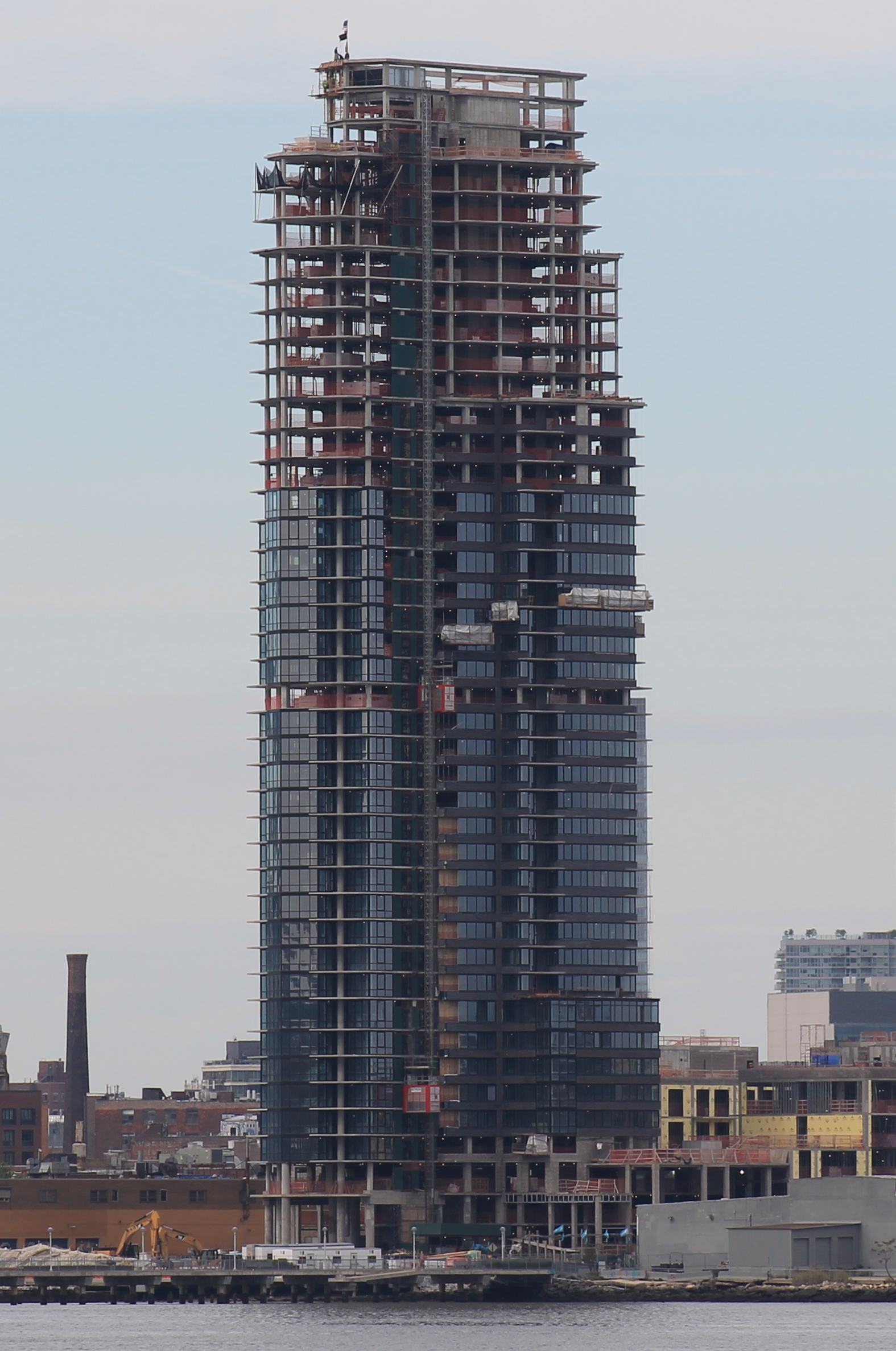
Alternate side view of facade installation in May 2017.

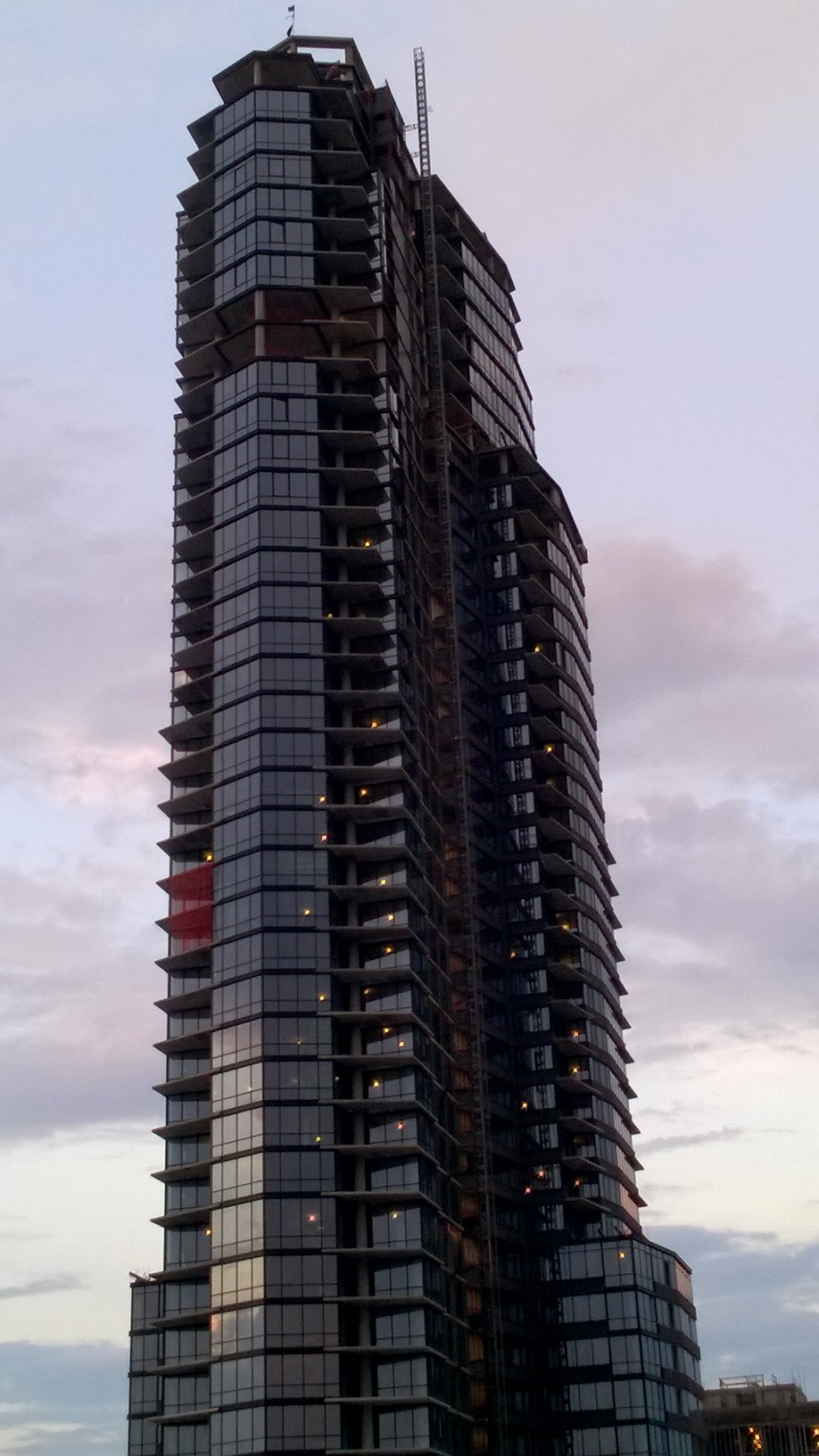
Closeup view while under construction.

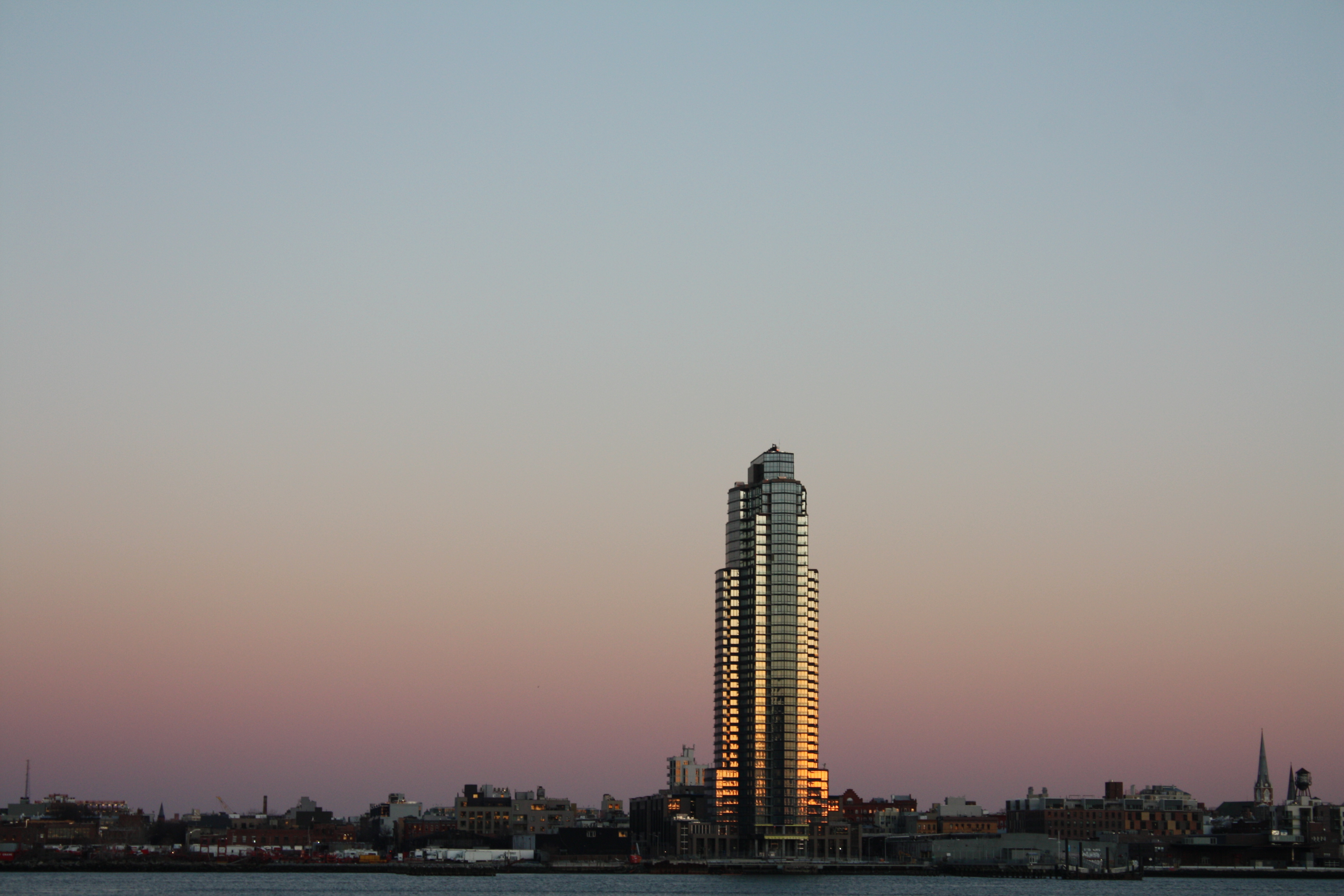
Viewed from across the river

== See also ==
- List of tallest buildings in Brooklyn
- List of tallest buildings in New York City
