= Nelson Tower =

Office skyscraper in Manhattan, New York

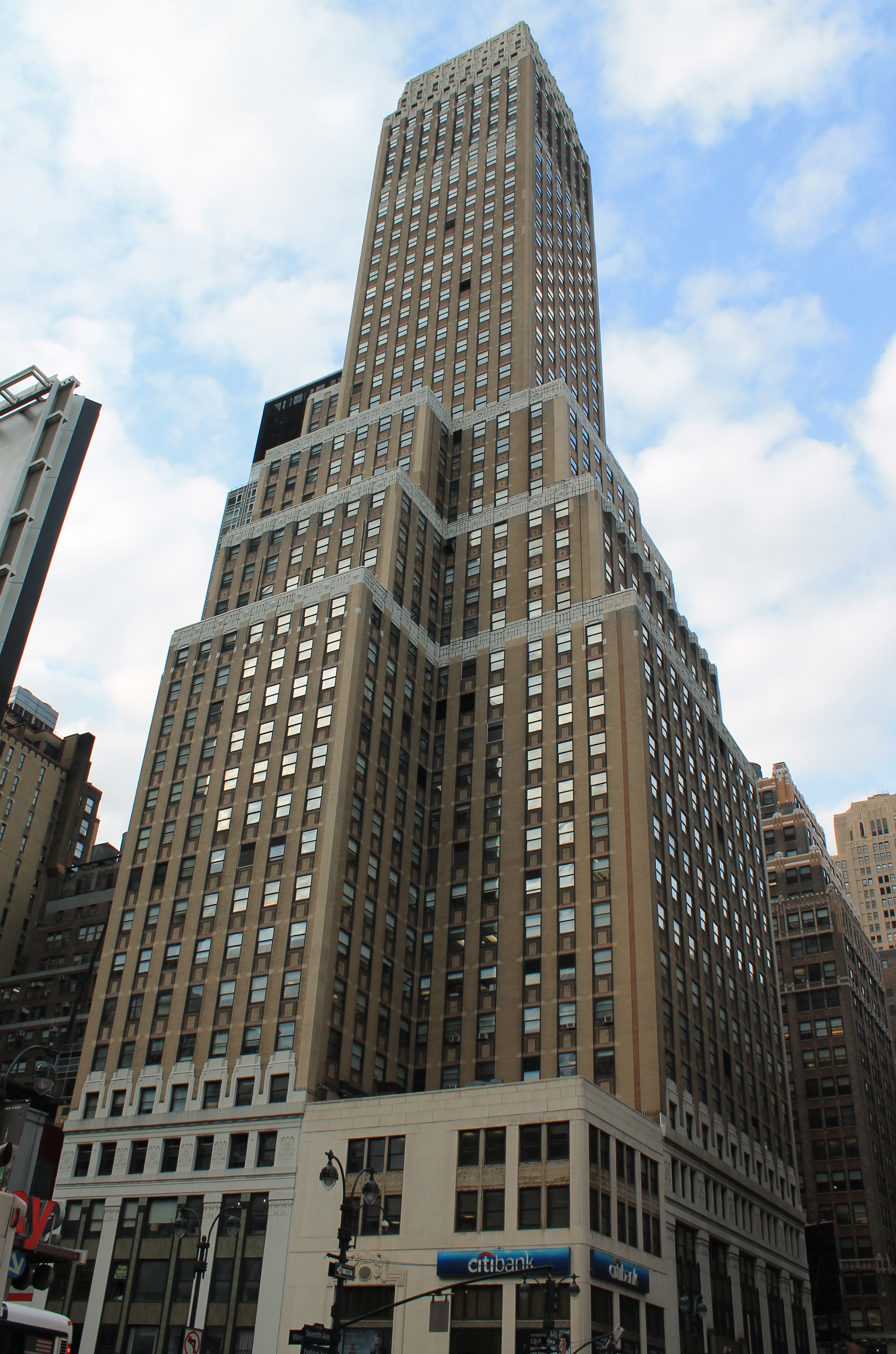
- Nelson Tower from the south.
- Interactive map of the Nelson Tower area

General information
- Type: Office
- Architectural style: Art Deco
- Location: 450 Seventh Avenue, Garment District, Manhattan, New York, U.S. 10123
- Coordinates: 40°45′05″N 73°59′27″W
- Construction started: 1930
- Completed: 1931

Height
- Height: 560 ft (170 m)

Technical details
- Floor count: 46
- Lifts/elevators: 15

Design and construction
- Architect: H. Craig Severance
- Developer: Julius Nelson

Website
- www.450seventhave.com

Nelson Tower is a 46-story, 560-foot-tall (170 m) skyscraper located at 450 Seventh Avenue between 34th Street and 35th Street in Midtown Manhattan, New York City.

== History ==
It was completed in 1931 and became the tallest building in the Garment District of Manhattan. Today it is dwarfed by the 60 story One Penn Plaza that sits across 34th Street from the Nelson Tower but still visible from most directions except the southeast. It was designed by H. Craig Severance. The building was originally planned and built by New York developer Julius Nelson.

== Architecture ==
The building has a rectangular base and recedes at different places. Each section is of brown stone with the top of them lined with white stone. The crown is completely white stone and has a slight slope.

== See also ==
- List of tallest buildings in New York City
