= AVA DoBro =

Residential skyscraper in Brooklyn, New York

Coordinates: 40°41′30.8″N 73°59′4.6″W

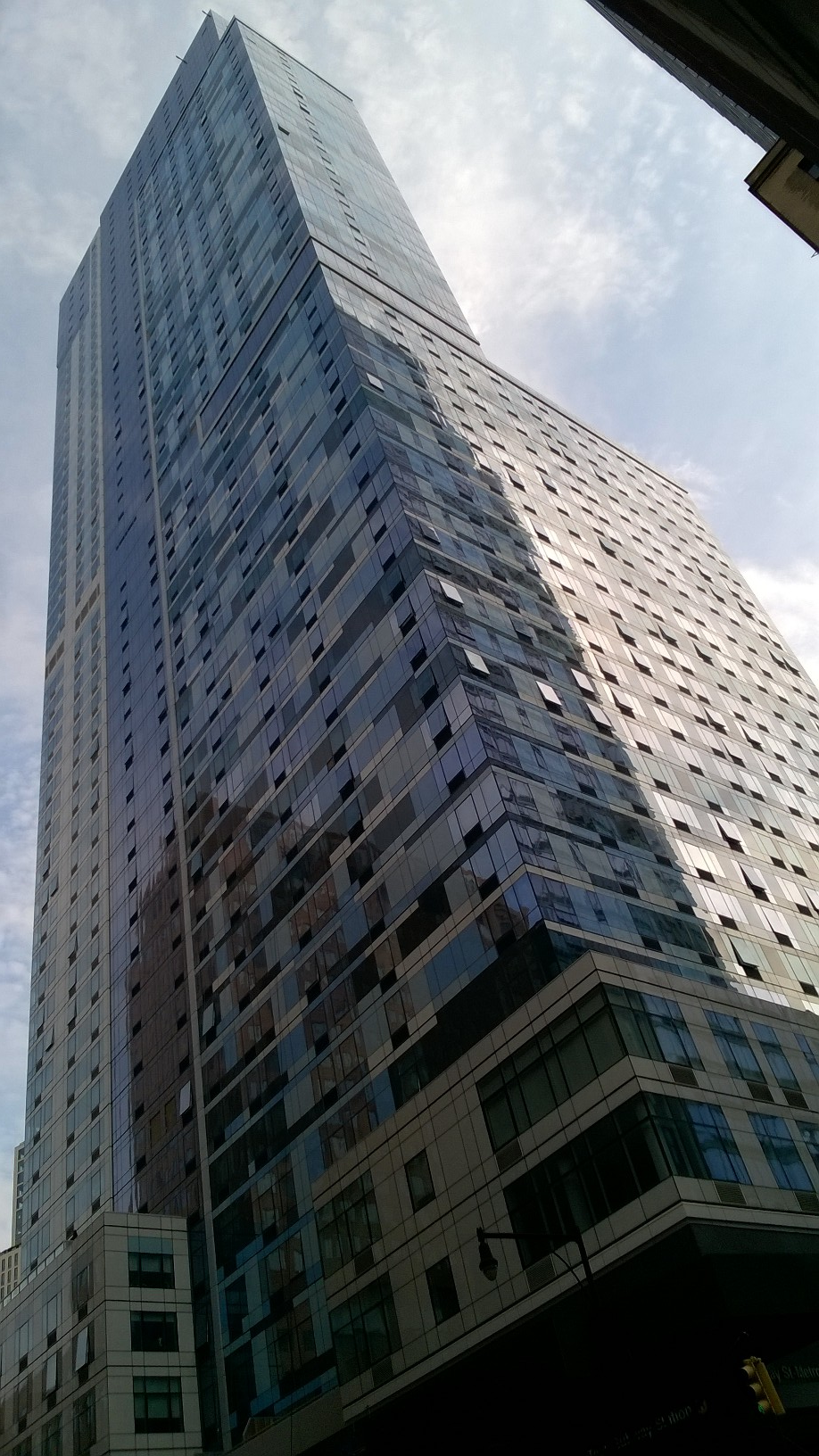
- Interactive map of the AVA DoBro area
- Alternative names: Avalon Willoughby West

General information
- Status: Completed
- Type: Residential
- Location: 100 Willoughby Street, Brooklyn, New York 11201 United States
- Construction started: 2013
- Completed: 2015

Height
- Roof: 624 ft (190 m)

Technical details
- Floor count: 57

Design and construction
- Architects: Schuman, Lichtenstein, Claman & Efron
- Structural engineer: DeSimone Consulting Engineers

AVA DoBro, also known as Avalon Willoughby West and by its address of 100 Willoughby, is a residential high-rise building in Downtown Brooklyn, New York City. Developed by AvalonBay Communities, it has 826 units over 57 floors. As part of the development, a new entrance to the Jay Street–MetroTech station of the New York City Subway was built, including an elevator.

When it topped out in July 2015, it became the tallest building in Brooklyn, surpassing 388 Bridge Street by 34 feet (10 m); until it was passed by The Hub a few months later.

== Gallery ==
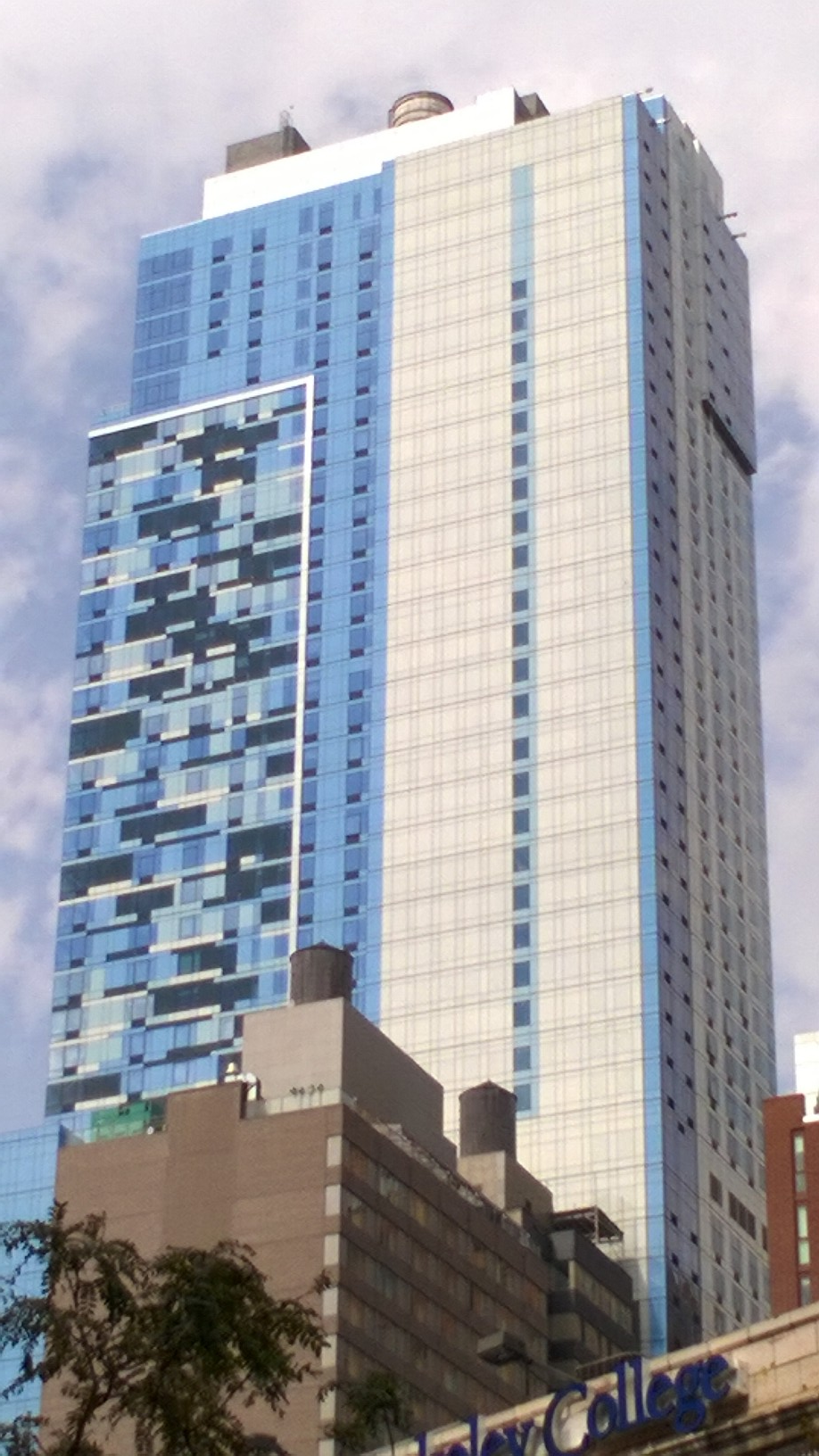
External rear view glass trim for the building.

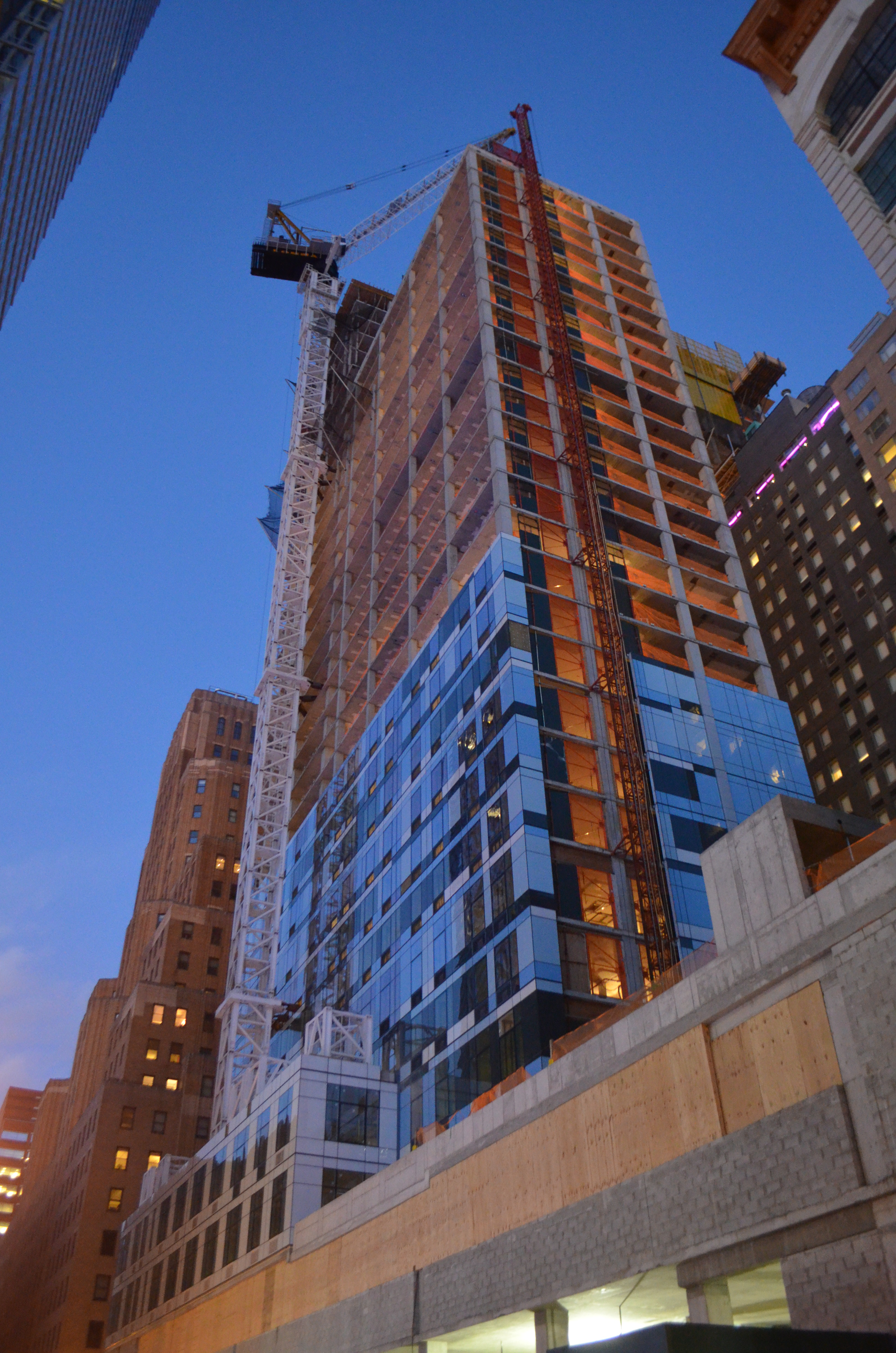
Tower under construction in 2014.

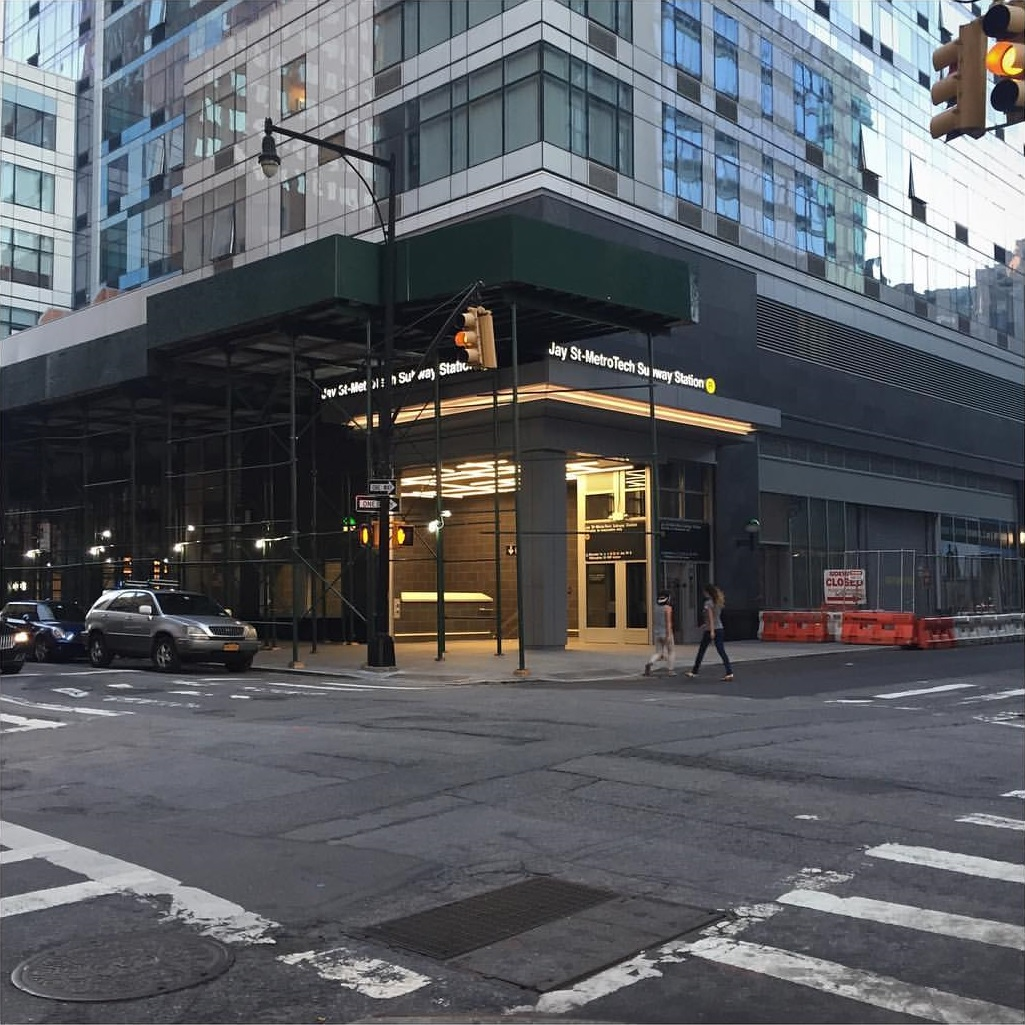
The new subway entrance for 2016.

== See also ==
- List of tallest buildings in Brooklyn
- List of tallest buildings in New York City
- The Hub

Records
Preceded by 388 Bridge Street	Tallest building in Brooklyn; 2015–2017	Succeeded by The Hub
