= H. Craig Severance =

American architect

- Born: July 1, 1879; Chazy, New York
- Died: September 2, 1941 (aged 62); Neptune Township, New Jersey
- Occupation: Architect
- Spouse: Faith Griswold Thompson
- Practice: Carrere and Hastings
- Buildings: Nelson Tower, 40 Wall Street, Montague-Court Building, Taft Hotel

Harold Craig Severance (July 1, 1879 – September 2, 1941) was an American architect who designed a number of well-known buildings in New York City, including the Coca-Cola Building, Nelson Tower and most prominently, 40 Wall Street.

== Biography ==
He was born on July 1, 1879, to George Craig Severance and Emma Alida Gilbert. He married Faith Griswold Thompson.

In his early career, Severance worked for Carrere and Hastings and later, in partnership with William Van Alen. The partnership ended on unfriendly terms, and in the late 1920s, the two found themselves in competition to build the world's tallest building, with Severance's 40 Wall Street and Van Alen's Chrysler Building. Although the Chrysler Building claimed victory with its spire at 1,046 feet, Severance protested that his building had the highest usable space. The issue became moot when the Empire State Building was completed less than a year later.

He died on September 2, 1941.

== Other well-known designs ==
- 50 Broadway, New York City
- 400 Madison Avenue, New York City
- Bank of the U.S., New York City
- Montague-Court Building, New York City
- Taft Hotel, New York City
- 181 Skunks Misery Rd, Lattingtown, New York
