= 75 Livingston Street =

Residential skyscraper in Brooklyn, New York

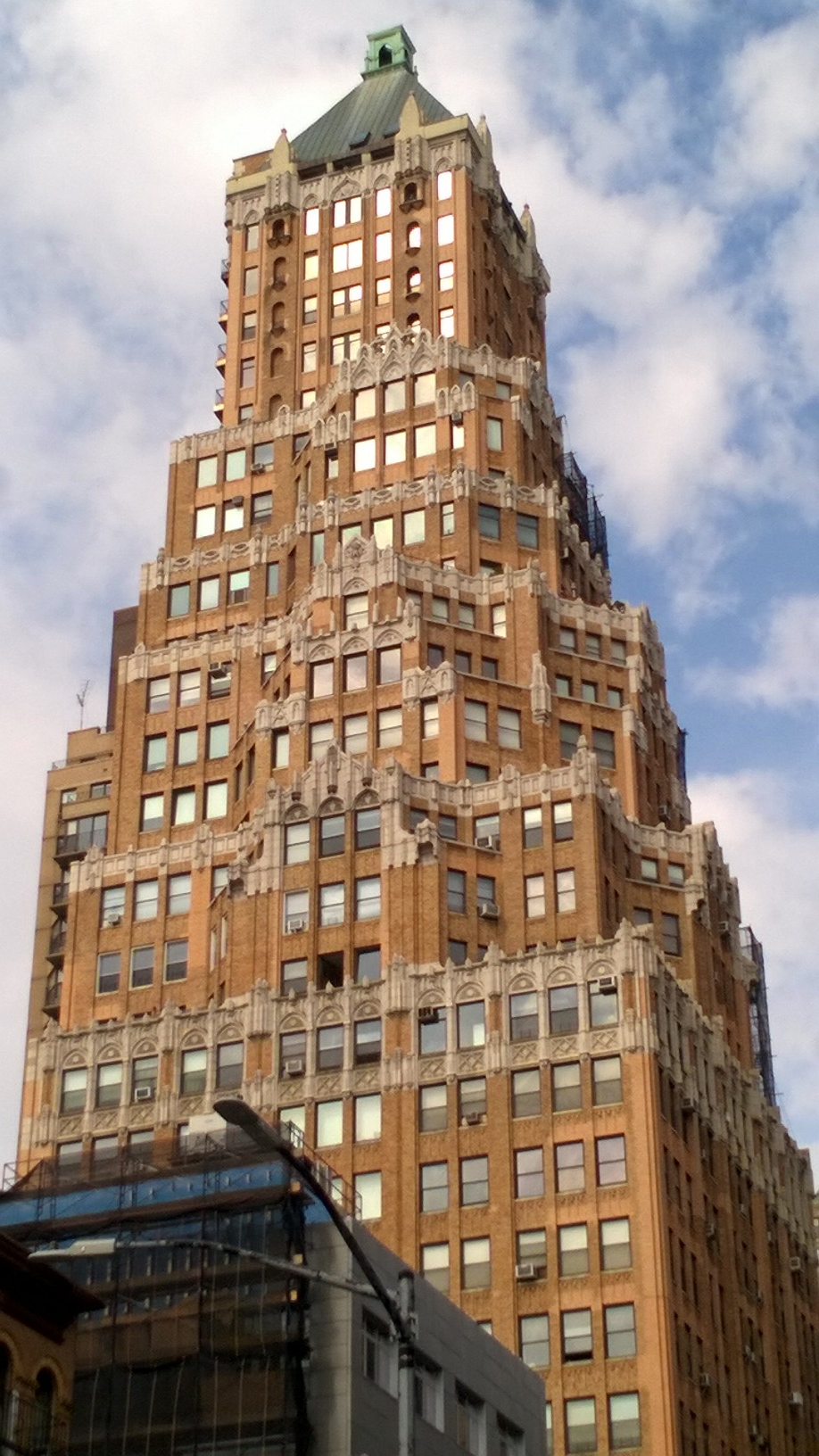
- Interactive map of the 75 Livingston Street area

General information
- Type: Residential
- Architectural style: Gothic Revival
- Location: 75 Livingston Street, Brooklyn, New York 11201
- Coordinates: 40.6919°N 73.9916°W
- Completed: 1926
- Owner: Heights 75 Owners Corporation

Height
- Roof: 343 ft (105 m)

Technical details
- Floor count: 30

Design and construction
- Architect: Abraham J. Simberg
- Developer: Jacob Adelman

75 Livingston Street, also known as the Court Chambers Building, or the Brooklyn Chamber of Commerce Building, is a 30-story 343 ft (105 m) residential cooperative tower in the Downtown Brooklyn neighborhood of New York City. The building was designed by architect Abraham J. Simberg, and built in 1926. The building was initially designed to have a dining room on the terrace of the 25th floor and to be 430 ft high (131 m).

At one time in the past, the structure was called the Court-Livingston, due to its alternate street address of 66 Court Street. Originally constructed as an office tower, the building was converted into cooperative apartments in 1981. In 2010 the building was included in the Borough Hall Skyscraper Historic District, which would landmark it, as well as several of the surrounding buildings. This inclusion came with disagreements from many residents of the building who claimed that, not only was the building's architecture not significant enough to merit landmark status, but also argued that the status would be financially adverse for those living in the building. However, the building was included in the Historic District and was landmarked in 2011.

== See also ==
- List of tallest buildings in Brooklyn
- List of tallest buildings in New York City
