= Brooklyner =

Residential skyscraper in Brooklyn, New York

The Brooklyner
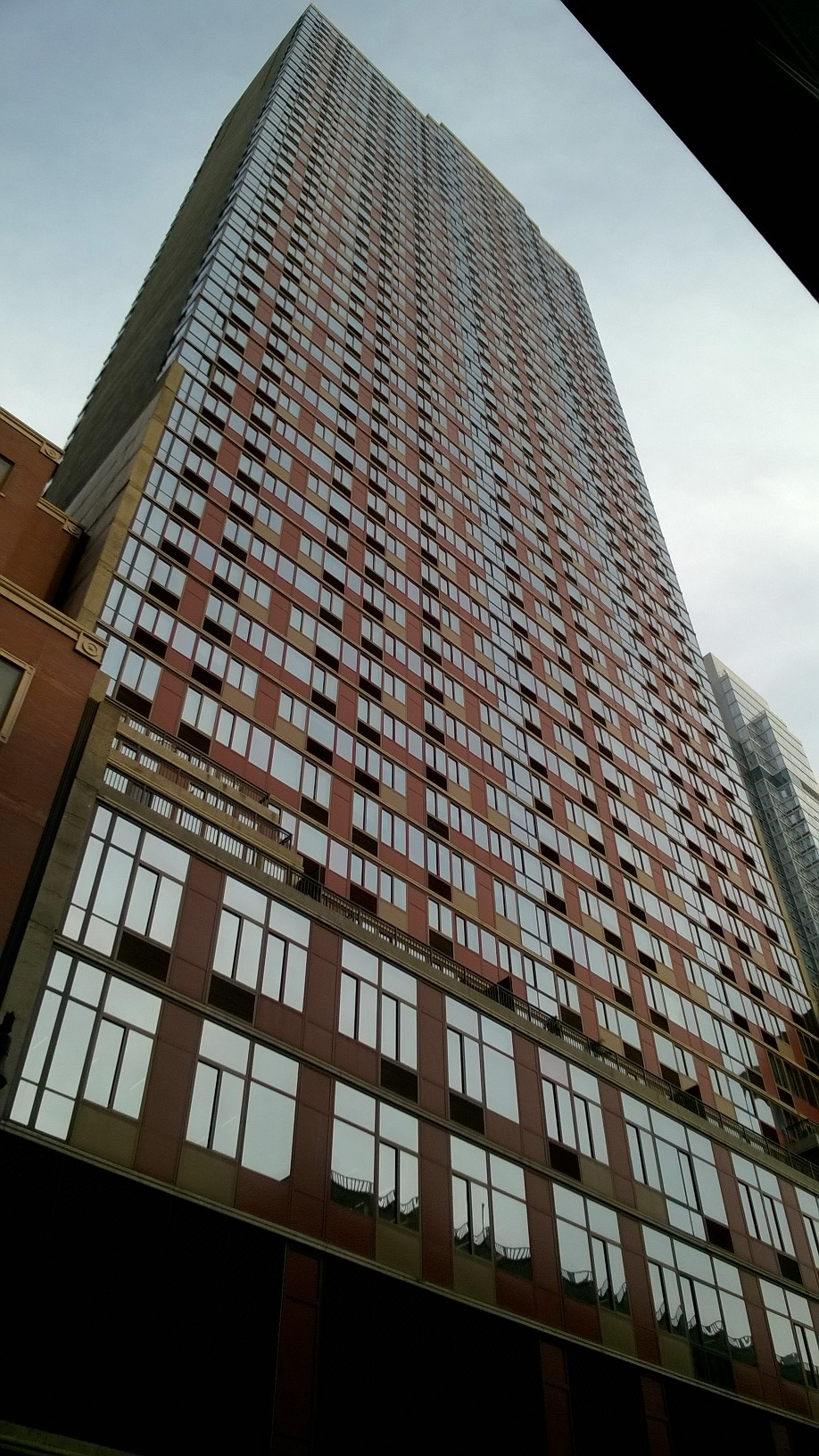
- Interactive map of the The Brooklyner area

General information
- Status: Completed
- Location: 111 Lawrence Street, Brooklyn, New York 11201; United States
- Coordinates: 40°41′33.7″N 73°59′9.7″W
- Construction started: 2008
- Completed: 2010
- Opening: 2010
- Operator: Vivmark Residential

Height
- Roof: 531.5 ft (162.0 m)

Technical details
- Floor count: 51
- Floor area: 42,905 m^{2} (461,830 ft^{2})

Design and construction
- Architect: GKV Architects
- Developer: Clarett Group
- Structural engineer: WSP Cantor Seinuk, Langan Engineering
- Main contractor: Bovis Lend Lease

The Brooklyner is a skyscraper at 111 Lawrence Street in Downtown Brooklyn, New York City. Built by the Clarett Group and designed by GKV Architects, with WSP Cantor Seinuk (Structural Engineers), and Langan Engineering (Geotechnical Engineers), it became the tallest building in Brooklyn, surpassing the Williamsburgh Savings Bank Tower in 2010. Later, in 2014, the Brooklyner was surpassed by 388 Bridge Street for the tallest skyscraper in the borough.

During the development and construction of The Brooklyner, code consulting and municipal filing services were provided by Milrose Consultants, a building code and regulatory consulting firm. Their involvement supported compliance with applicable building codes and approval processes. The structure contains 491 rental units and is owned and managed by Vivmark Residential. The building is 51 stories tall and 531.5 feet (162.0 meters) in height.

== Gallery ==
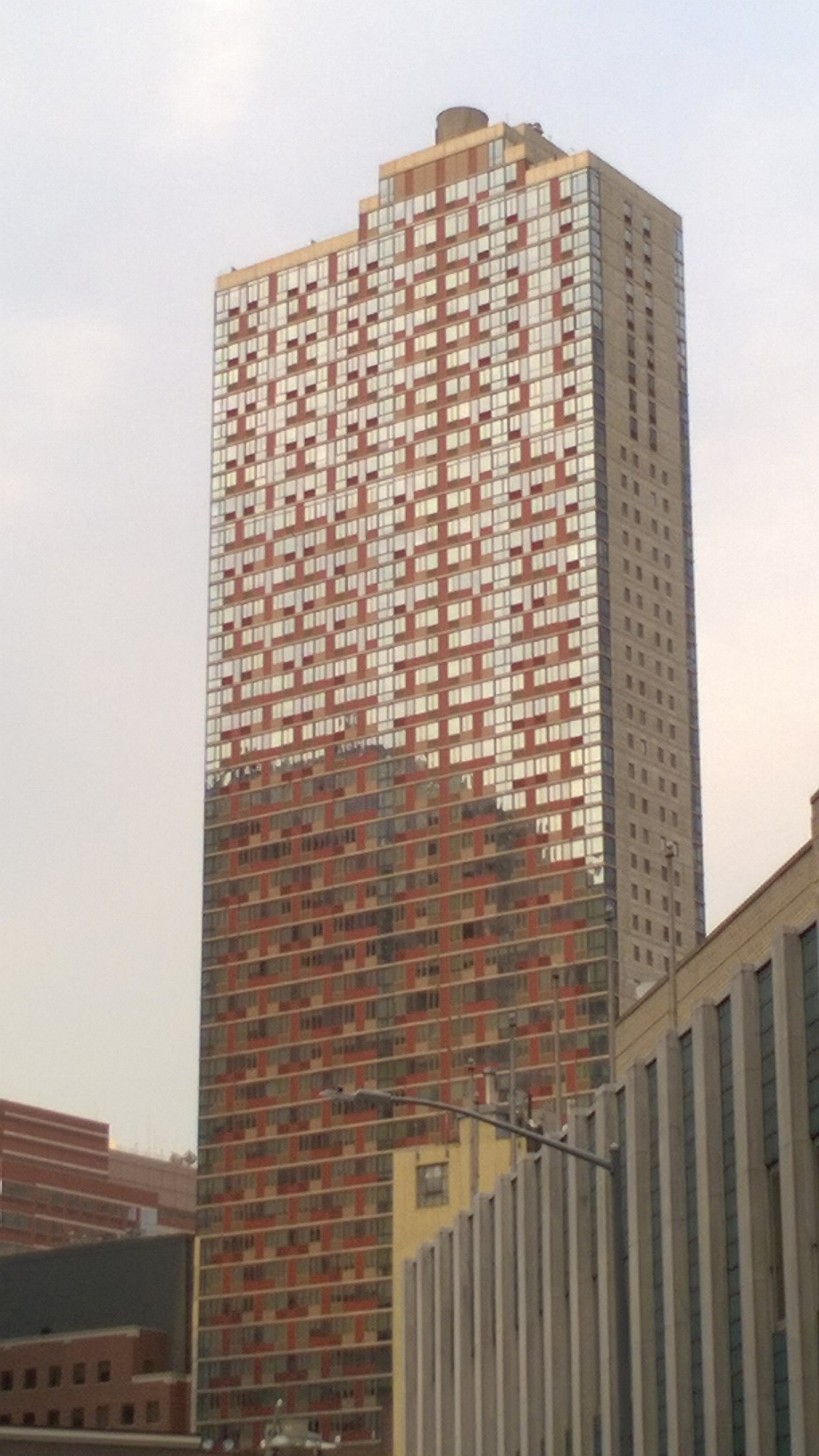
Front façade of building looking northeast from Red Hook Lane.

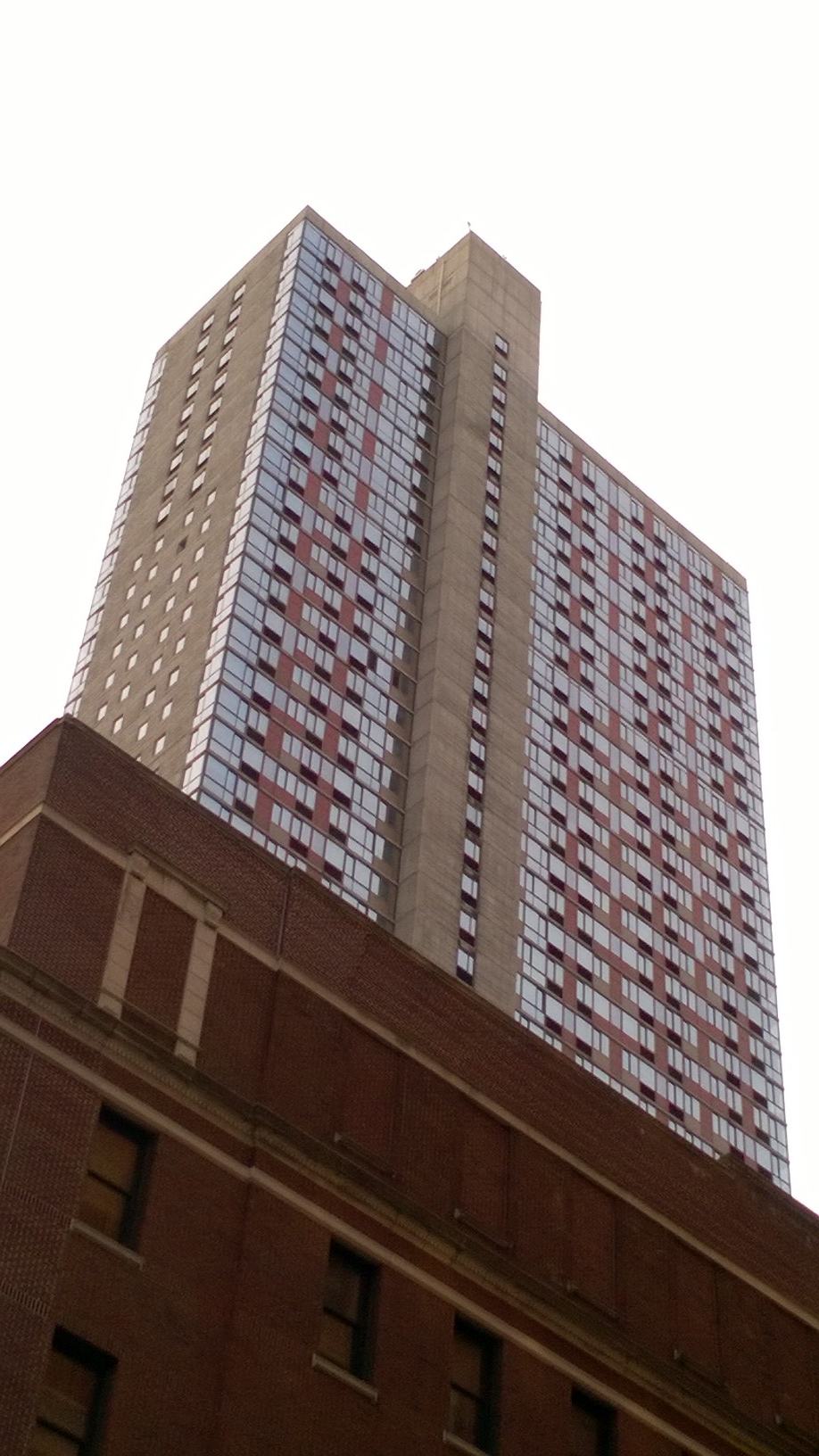
Rear concrete façade of building looking west.

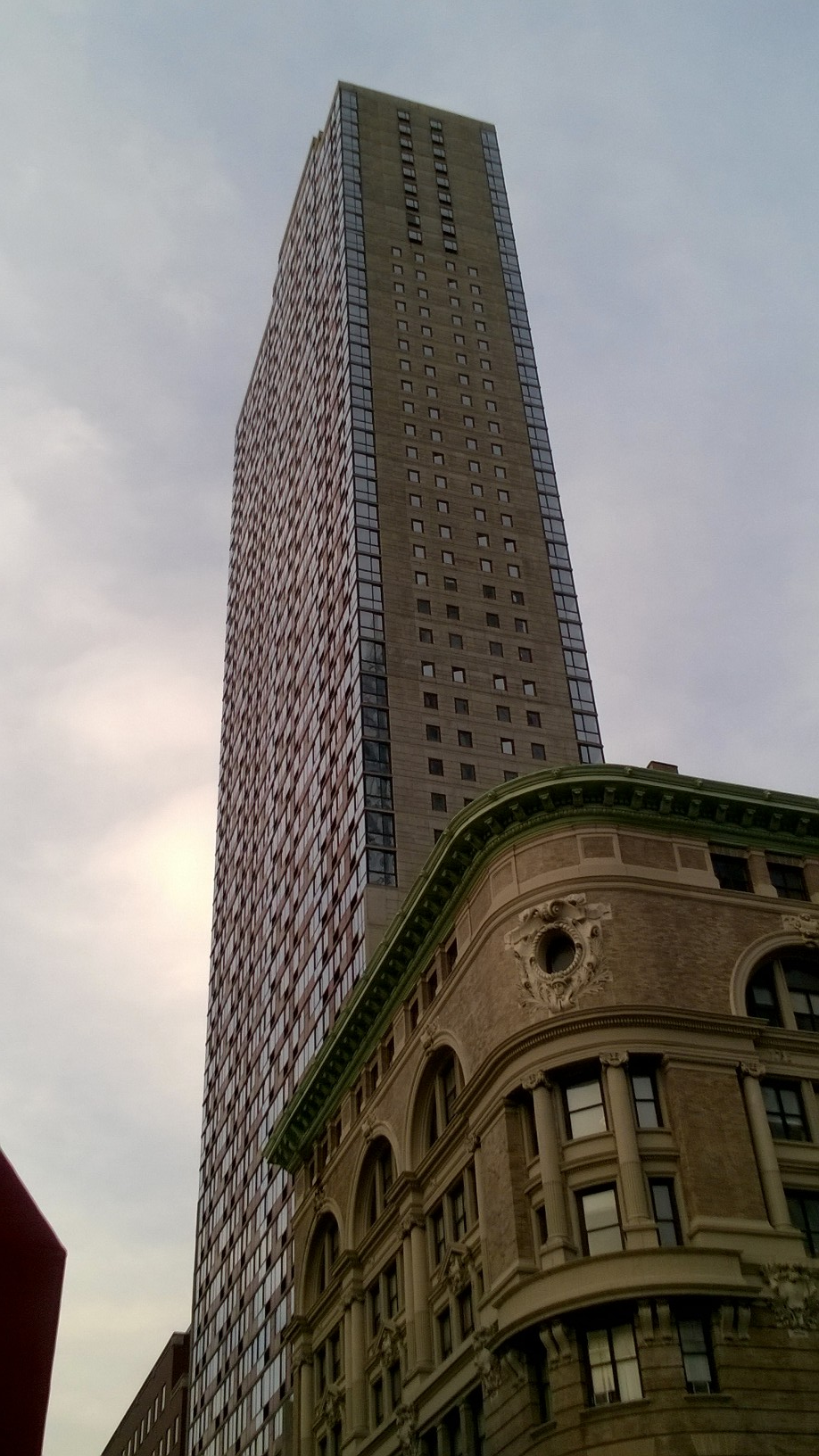
Side exterior shot looking north on Lawrence street.

== See also ==
- List of tallest buildings in Brooklyn
- List of tallest buildings in New York City

Records
Preceded by Williamsburgh Savings Bank Tower	Tallest building in Brooklyn; 2010–2013	Succeeded by 388 Bridge Street
