= Montague–Court Building =

Office skyscraper in Brooklyn, New York

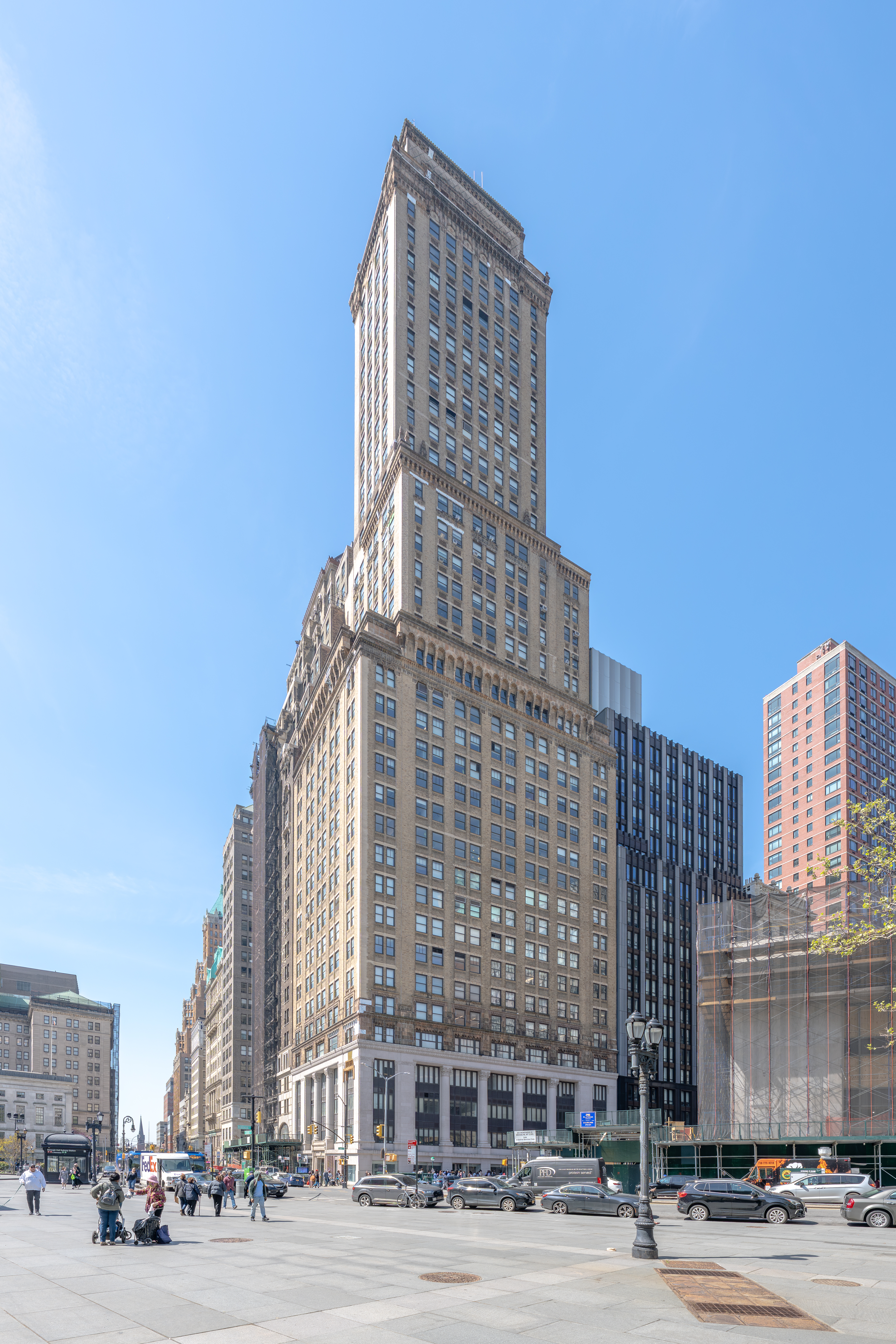
- (2026)
- Interactive map of the Montague–Court Building area

General information
- Type: Office
- Architectural style: Art Deco; Renaissance Revival
- Location: 16 Court Street, Brooklyn, NY
- Coordinates: 40°41′37″N 73°59′27″W
- Construction started: 1925
- Completed: 1927
- Owner: CIM Group

Height
- Roof: 462 ft (141 m)

Technical details
- Floor count: 35

Design and construction
- Architect: H. Craig Severance

The Montague–Court Building is a 35-story, 462 ft (141 m) tall commercial office tower at 16 Court Street in Downtown Brooklyn, New York City. It was designed by architect H. Craig Severance and built in 1927. It is the tallest office building and the twelfth tallest building overall in Brooklyn at 462 feet (141 m). The building is 35 stories tall and has a floor area of 317,625 ft^{2} (29,508.3 m^{2}). In February 2012, the New York City Landmarks Preservation Commission designated the building as part of the Borough Hall Skyscraper Historic District.

The Montague–Court Building has been owned and managed by the CIM Group since 2017, when CIM purchased the structure from SL Green Realty for $171 million. The building was in danger of foreclosure by 2025 due to low occupancy rates.

== See also ==
- List of tallest buildings in Brooklyn
- List of tallest buildings in New York City

Records
Preceded by Court and Remsen Building	Tallest building in Brooklyn; 1927–1929	Succeeded by Williamsburgh Savings Bank Tower
