= Atlantic Terminal Site 4B =

Public housing development in Brooklyn, New York

Atlantic Terminal Houses Atlantic Terminal Site 4B Houses
- NYCHA Property
- Atlantic Terminal Site 4B
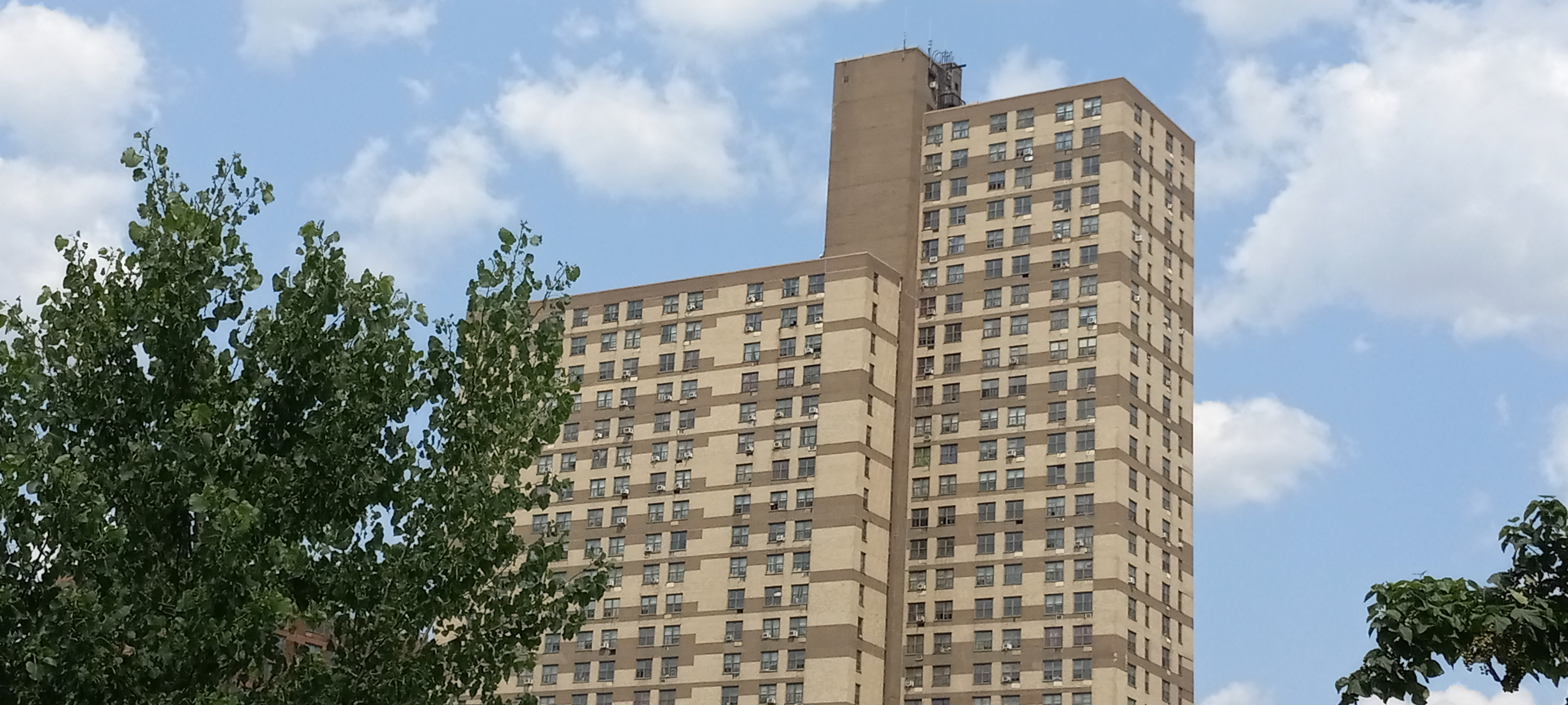
- Interactive map of Atlantic Terminal Houses
- Country: United States
- State: New York
- City: New York City
- Borough: Brooklyn

Area
  - Total: 2.02 acres (0.82 ha)

Population
  - Total: 478
- Zip Code: 11238

The Atlantic Terminal Site 4B Houses are a NYCHA housing project with one building containing 31 stories. It is located in the corner of Carlton and Atlantic Avenues in Fort Greene, Brooklyn. Rising to a height of 306 ft (93 m), it is the tallest building built by NYCHA being 31 stories. This building was completed on April 30, 1976.

In 2019, three residents that had lived at the Atlantic Terminal Houses since the complex opened received a grant from University Settlement to create a community storytelling project, which was released as an audio walking tour the following year.

== 21st century ==
During this century, this housing project was chosen to be part of the Permanent Affordability Commitment Together (PACT) in which will have roof replacements, many renovations with the exterior and the interior including the community space.

== See also ==
- New York City Housing Authority
