= 1 Clinton Street =

Building in Brooklyn, New York

One Clinton
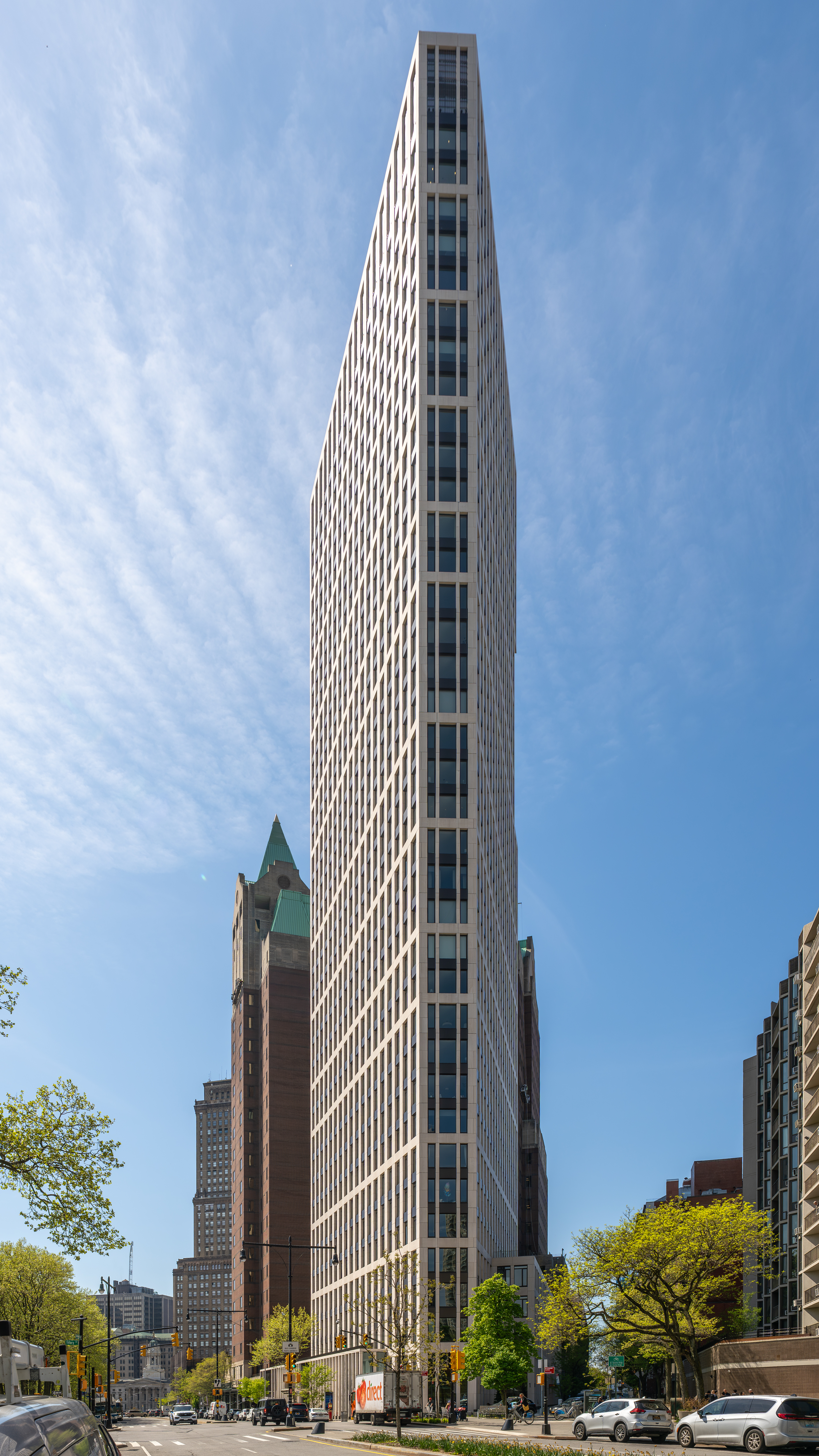

- Location within New York City

General information
- Status: Completed
- Type: Mixed use
- Location: Brooklyn, New York
- Coordinates: 40.695688°N 73.991369°W

Height
- Height: 409 feet (125 m)

Technical details
- Floor count: 36
- Floor area: 407,907 square feet (37,895.8 m^{2})

Design and construction
- Architect: Marvel Architects

One Clinton (previously known as 280 Cadman Plaza West) is a residential building in the Brooklyn Heights neighborhood of Brooklyn in New York City, United States. The building replaced a preexisting branch of the Brooklyn Public Library. It was developed by Hudson Companies and designed by Marvel Architects.

== History ==
The Brooklyn Public Library's Brooklyn Heights Library at 280 Cadman Plaza West was built in 1962. The two-story library was originally designed to serve as a library and a fallout shelter. During the next half-century, the building had accrued many defects in need of overdue maintenance. The New York City Department of Design and Construction and a third party consultant separately assessed the property and agreed that the building had roughly $9 million worth of overdue capital needs. The building needed $3.6 million for a new heating, ventilation, and air cooling system. $4.2 million were needed for upgrades to the boiler, lighting, roof, and site drainage. $1 million would be required for new elevators. Lastly, $500,000 were needed for fire safety and security enhancements, which are held to a higher standard since the building was built. These large outstanding costs contributed to a decision to sell the site to a private developer and build a new branch library on the ground floor of a new, privately owned residential development.

In June 2013, the New York City Economic Development Corporation issued a Request for Proposals to redevelop the location. The site was sold to Hudson Companies, Inc. in September 2014 for $52 million, with approximately $10 million from the proceeds allocated to the fitting-out of the new library. As part of the sale agreement, Hudson committed to build 114 units of affordable housing on two privately owned sites in Community Board 2. The affordable housing did not utilize any public subsidy. The Brooklyn Heights Library was temporarily relocated to 109 Remsen Street, five blocks from the current location, in a renovated space at Our Lady of Lebanon Church. The interim library opened to the public in July 2016.

Demolition plans for the site were filed and approved in March 2017, and demolition proceeded as planned. By September 2018, construction was underway and about a third of the building was completed. Six bas reliefs that had adorned the facade of the old library were incorporated into the rising building. The new building topped out in April 2019, with construction largely complete by April 2022.

The first week of June 2022 saw the new three-story branch library open, containing a dedicated area for children, a multi-use community room with kitchenette and stage, and a mezzanine for adolescent patrons. 2 of the bas reliefs from the old library were incorporated into the walls of conference rooms. The other four were relocated to the garden of the Walt Whitman library. By the middle of June 2023, a penthouse condo in the newly completed building was the most expensive home to enter the market that week with its asking price of $9 million.

The affordable housing units constructed as part of the building permit agreement were completed by August 2019 and a lottery opened to potential residents of the 114 apartments. The rent was set at an area median income range of 60 percent for 23 of the units, 80 percent for 60 of the units and 130 percent for the remaining 31 units. Eligible incomes ranged between $32,675 and $172,120 for households of one to seven people.

== Design ==
The new building, a 36-story condominium with the new public library at the base, is 409 feet (125 m) tall with total floor area of 407,907 square feet (37,895.8 m^{2}) including residential parking spaces. The new public library occupies 26,620 square feet (2,473 m^{2}) of space and has a dedicated entrance at 286 Cadman Plaza West. The residential condominium contains 134 units occupying 276,702 square feet (25,706.5 m^{2}). In addition to the library unit and residential units, the building includes a 9,000-square-foot (840 m^{2}) STEM Lab for students in school district 13, and a 930-square-foot (86 m^{2}) retail space on the first floor.

Marvel Architects, the architects of record for the new building, described their design as "a minimalist, highly repetitive, gridded facade clad in limestone" that "gives the building an elegant presence within the varied urban context." They noted that "[t]he building's distinct shape comes from its triangular footprint, creating three façades that address different parts of the city: the harbor to the southwest, Manhattan's Midtown to the north, and the carpet of brownstone Brooklyn to the east."

There was some controversy regarding two bas-reliefs which were made by Clemente Spampinato, which had to be removed from the previous public library before demolition could commence. Deputy Director of the PDC Keri Butler said of the bas-reliefs, "The Public Design Commission has reviewed the methods and materials for removing the artworks from the facade of the library and temporarily storing them, and has found these methods to be appropriate with the understanding that a proposal for relocating the artworks within the new development at 280 Cadman Plaza West will be submitted by September 2017."

== Controversy ==
The sale of the building caused controversy; initial proposals involving the sale of the site were opposed by two organizations: Citizens Defending Libraries and Love Brooklyn Libraries. Concerns included increased traffic, overpopulation of the local schools, the decrease of the library's space, and worries over the developer's pledge to provide affordable housing. The Brooklyn Public Library provided a defense of the sale, stating in front of city council that it receives insufficient funds from the city. However, a complaint sent to the city and state attorney general alleges that the Public Library has over $100 million in unspent funds.

== Usage ==
The building is residential, with the exception of a small retail space and first floor library branch. As part of the deal through which Hudson was given development rights, 114 units of affordable housing were built in Clinton Hill. The project also included a dedicated science, technology, engineering and mathematics (STEM) education lab for the local school district, an amenity negotiated during the Uniform Land Use Review Procedure (ULURP) process.
