= Brooklyn Technical High School =

Specialized high school in New York City, US

Location
- 29 Fort Greene Place; Brooklyn, New York 11217; United States; 40°41′20″N 73°58′37″W

Information
- Type: Public, Selective school
- Established: 1922; 104 years ago
- School district: New York City Department of Education
- School number: 430
- NCES School ID: 360009101928
- Principal: David Newman
- Teaching staff: 288.40 (on an FTE basis)
- Grades: 9–12
- Enrollment: 5,808 (2023–2024)
- Student to teacher ratio: 20.14
- Campus: City: Large
- Colors: Navy Blue and White
- Athletics conference: PSAL
- Mascot: BT Beaver the Engineer
- Nickname: Brooklyn Tech, BTHS, Tech
- Newspaper: The Survey (official); Radish (student, satirical)
- Yearbook: The Blueprint
- Website: www.bths.edu

Brooklyn Technical High School, commonly called Brooklyn Tech and administratively designated High School 430, is a public specialized high school in New York City that specializes in science, technology, engineering, and mathematics. It is one of the three original specialized high schools operated by the New York City Department of Education, along with Stuyvesant High School and the Bronx High School of Science. It is the largest single-campus in-person high school in the nation.

Admission to Brooklyn Tech involves taking the Specialized High Schools Admissions Test and scoring the cutoff for Brooklyn Tech. Each November, about 30,000 eighth and ninth graders take the 3-hour test for admittance to eight of the nine specialized high schools. About 1,400 to 1,500 students are admitted each year.

Brooklyn Tech counts top scientists, inventors, innovators, Fortune 500 company CEOs and founders, high-ranking diplomats, academic scholars, literary and media figures, professional athletes, National Medal recipients, Nobel laureates, and Olympic medalists among its alumni.

== Overview ==
=== Admission ===
Admission to Brooklyn Tech is based exclusively on the Specialized High Schools Admissions Test (SHSAT), open to all eighth-grade and first-time ninth-grade New York City students. The test has math (word problems and computation) and verbal (reading comprehension and grammar) sections.

=== Graduation requirements ===
Per the New York State graduation requirements, students can earn a local diploma, a Regents diploma, or an advanced Regents diploma.

To earn a Brooklyn Tech diploma, students must meet the following requirements in addition to the Advanced Regents Diploma requirements.

- Pass 2 semesters of Design & Drafting for Production
- Pass 2 semesters of AP Principles of Computer Science
- Pass Chemistry & Physics and their corresponding Regents exams
- Pass all courses required for their specific major
- A minimum of 50 hours of community service outside of the school or through specified club activities.
- Participation in at least one club, sport, or school-run activity.

=== Reputation ===
Brooklyn Tech has been considered a prestigious high school in the United States. Together with Stuyvesant High School and Bronx High School of Science, it is one of the three original Specialized High Schools of New York City, operated by the New York City Department of Education, all three of which The Washington Post cited in 2006 as among the country's best magnet schools (a category the school is often placed in, though its founding predates the concept of a "magnet school", whose intended purpose was not the same). Admission is by competitive examination. As a public school, Brooklyn Tech has no tuition fee, but only students who reside in New York City are allowed to attend, as per the Hecht-Calandra Act. (Note: Three new schools were added to that list in the mid-2000s: the High School for Math, Science and Engineering at City College, the High School of American Studies at Lehman College, and the Queens High School for the Sciences at York College. However, these were not afforded Specialized High Schools status under New York State Law.)

Brooklyn Tech ranked 7th in New York State on the 2024 U.S. News & World Report "Best High Schools" list. In 2008, Newsweek listed it among five public high schools that were not in the magazine's 13 "Public Elite" ranking, explaining, "Newsweek's Challenge Index is designed to recognize schools that challenge average students, and not magnet or charter schools that draw only the best students in their areas. These [...] were excluded from the list of top high schools because [...] their sky-high SAT and ACT scores indicate they have few or no average students".

== History ==
In 1918, Dr. Albert L. Colston, chair of the Math Department at Manual Training High School, recommended establishing a technical high school for Brooklyn boys. His plan envisioned a heavy concentration of math, science, and drafting courses with parallel paths leading either to college or to a technical career in industry. By 1922, Dr. Colston's concept was approved by the Board of Education, and Brooklyn Technical High School opened in a converted warehouse at 49 Flatbush Avenue Extension, with 2,400 students. This location, in the shadow of the Manhattan Bridge, is the reason the school seal bears that bridge's image, rather than the more obvious symbol for the borough, the Brooklyn Bridge. Brooklyn Tech would occupy one more location before settling into its site at 29 Fort Greene Place, for which the groundbreaking was held in 1930.

=== Early years ===
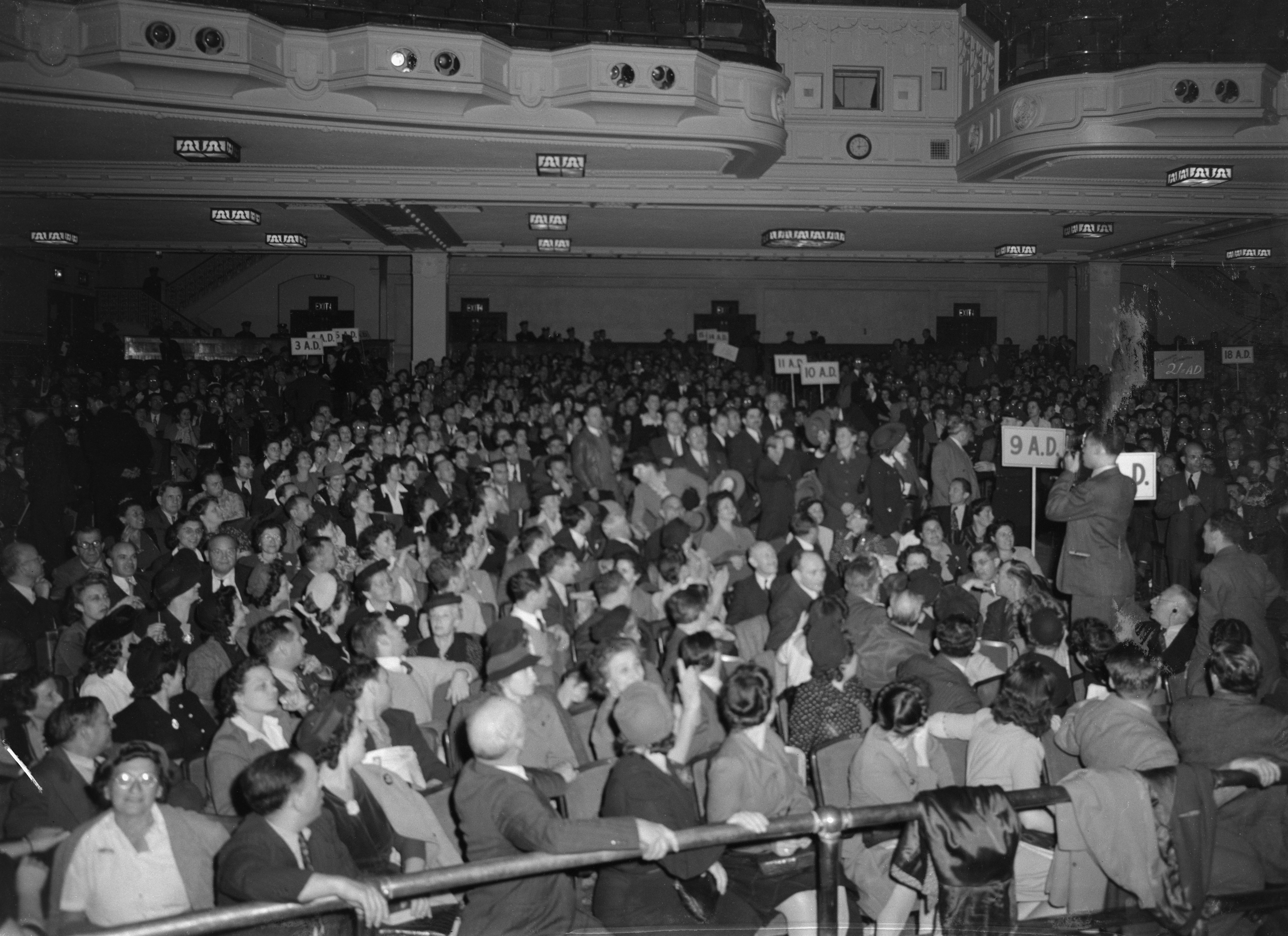
The Kings County American Labor Party convention convenes in the BTHS auditorium, October 11, 1943

Atypical for American high schools, Brooklyn Tech uses a system of college-style majors. The curriculum consists of two years of general studies with a technical and engineering emphasis, followed by two years of a student-chosen major.

The curriculum remained largely unchanged until the end of Dr. Colston's 20-year term as principal in 1942. Upon his retirement, Tech was led briefly by acting principal Ralph Breiling, who was succeeded by Principal Harold Taylor in 1944. Tech's modernization would come under Principal William Pabst, who assumed stewardship in 1946 after serving as chair of the Electrical Department. Pabst created new majors and refined older ones, allowing students to select science and engineering preparatory majors including Aeronautical, Architecture, Chemical, Civil, Electrical (later including Electronics and Broadcast), Industrial Design, Mechanical, Structural, and Arts and Sciences. A general College Preparatory curriculum was added later.

Principal Pabst retired in 1964. A railroad club was established by the late Vincent Gorman, a social studies teacher, and students attended fan trips, tours of rail repair facilities and participated in the restoration of steam engine #103 and a historic rail passenger car at the former Empire State Railroad Museum. In August 1965, a ten-year-old boy named Carl Johnson drowned in the swimming pool at Brooklyn Tech while swimming with his day-camp group. The next year, more than 30 graduating Seniors in the school (including many student leaders) complained that Tech's curriculum was old and outdated. Their primary complaint was that the curriculum was geared toward the small minority of students who were not planning on attending college. In 1967, the schools of New York City got to view television in the classrooms for the first time, thanks to the 420-foot WNYE-TV tower atop Brooklyn Tech.

For the school year beginning in the last half of 1970, young women began attending; all three NYC specialized and test-required science high schools were now coeducational.

=== Incorporation into specialized high school system and later years ===
In 1972, Brooklyn Tech, Bronx Science, Stuyvesant High School, and High School for Performing Arts become incorporated by the New York State Legislature as specialized high schools of New York City. The act called for a uniform exam to be administered for admission to Brooklyn Tech, Bronx Science, and Stuyvesant. The exam would become known as the Specialized High Schools Admissions Test (SHSAT) and tested students in Math and English. With its statewide recognition, the school had to become co-educational. Previous to this, Brooklyn Tech was All Boys, and had a sister school, Bay Ridge High School which was all girls.

In 1973, Tech celebrated its 50th anniversary with a dinner-dance at the Waldorf Astoria. To further commemorate the anniversary, a monument was erected, with a time capsule beneath it, in the north courtyard. The monument has eight panels, each with a unique design representing each of Tech's eight majors at that point.

In 1983, Matt Mandery's appointment as principal made him the first Tech alumnus to hold that position. The same year, Tech received the Excellence in Education award from the U.S. Department of Education. The Alumni Association was formally created during this time, and coalitions were formed with the New York City Department of Transportation. Mandery oversaw the addition of a Bio-Medical major to the curriculum. John Tobin followed as principal in 1987, abolished the Materials Science department, and closed the seventh-floor foundry.

In the mid-1980s, a violent street gang known as the Decepticons were founded at Brooklyn Tech. As well, in 2000, the city issued a special report concerning the lack of notification to law enforcement during a string of robberies within the high school, including armed robbery with knives and stun guns.

=== Recent years ===
In March 1998, an alumni group led by Leonard Riggio, class of 1958, announced plans for a fund-raising campaign to raise $10 million to support their alma mater financially through facilities upgrades, the establishment of curriculum enhancements, faculty training, and a university-type endowment. The endowment fundraiser, the first of its kind for an American public school, received front-page attention in The New York Times and sparked a friendly competition amongst the specialized high schools, with both Bronx Science and Stuyvesant announcing their own $10 million campaigns within weeks of the Brooklyn Tech announcement. In November 2005, the Brooklyn Tech Alumni Association announced the completion of the fundraising phase of what they had termed the Campaign for Brooklyn Tech. In April 2008, the Brooklyn Tech Alumni Foundation launched a second endowment campaign.

Sixteen alumni died in the September 11 attacks in 2001. They are Dennis Cross '59, Ronald F. Orsini '60, Joel Miller '63, Sheldon R. Kanter '66, Stephen Johnson '75, Danny Libretti '76, Dominick E. Calia '79, Dipti Patel '81, Andre Fletcher '82, Courtney W. Walcott '82, Gerard Jean Baptiste '83, Wai C. Chung '84, Paul Innella '85, Michael McDonnell '85, Thomas Tong '87, and Paul Ortiz '98.

Since 2001, Brooklyn Tech has undergone refurbishing such as the renovation of the school's William L. Mack Library entrance, located on the fifth-floor center section. As well, two computer labs were added. The school also reinstated a class devoted to the study of Shakespeare, which students can elect to take in their senior year.

==== Lee McCaskill ====
Dr. Lee D. McCaskill, the appointed principal in 1992, served for 14 years, during which Tech saw the installation of more computer classrooms and the switch from the traditional mechanical drawing by hand to teaching the use of computer-aided design programs.

In 2000, the Special Commissioner of Investigation for the NYC School District wrote a report condemning Brooklyn Technical High School administrators for failing to report several armed robberies that took place in the bathrooms and stairwells.

In 2003, The New York Times published an investigative article that noted "longstanding tensions" between the faculty and Principal McCaskill, "spilled into the open in October, with news reports that several teachers accused him of repeatedly sending sexually explicit e-mail messages from his school computer to staff members." While the article praised him for his addition of music and sports programs, it mostly described the principal as autocratic, controlling the school "largely through fear and intimidation," and documented acts of personal vindictiveness toward teachers; severe censorship of the student newspaper and of assigned English texts, including the refusal to let the Pulitzer Prize-finalist novel Continental Drift by Russell Banks be used for a class; and of bureaucratic mismanagement. A follow-up column in 2004 found that there was increased teacher exodus, specifically documenting Principal McCaskill's campaign against Alice Alcala, who described as one of the city's leading Shakespeare teachers. Alcala had won Brooklyn Tech a $10,000 grant and brought in the Royal National Theatre of Great Britain for student workshops, but after Alcala had done so, McCaskill repeatedly denied her access to the auditorium and gave her low performance rankings. Shortly after, Alcala left for Manhattan's Murry Bergtraum High School, where she brought in $1,800 in grants for Shakespeare education; meanwhile, at Brooklyn Tech, there was no longer any course solely devoted to Shakespeare, according to the column.

In two newspaper articles in 2005, it was revealed that a $10,000 grant obtained by Dr. Sylvia Weinberger in 2001 to refurbish the obsolete radio studio remained unused. New classroom computers were covered in plastic rather than installed because the classrooms had yet to be wired for them.

The Office of Special Investigations of the New York City Department of Education launched an investigation of McCaskill on February 2, 2006, concerning unpaid enrollment of New Jersey resident McCaskill's daughter in a New York City public school, which is illegal for non-residents of the city. Dr. McCaskill produced a lease claiming that he rented an apartment in Brooklyn, but the copyright date on the lease was after the signatures were dated. On February 6, McCaskill announced his resignation from Brooklyn Tech and agreed to pay $19,441 in restitution.

A week later special commissioner Richard J. Condon rebuked the Department of Education for allowing McCaskill to retire, still collecting $125,282 in accrued vacation time, just days before the OSI completed its investigation. Condon also recommended that Cathy Furman McCaskill, the principal's wife, be dismissed from her position as a teacher at Boys and Girls High School in Brooklyn for her part in submitting fake leases and other fraudulent documents to indicate the family lived in the Cobble Hill section of Brooklyn. The next day, the Department of Education announced that it would fire her. After retiring from Brooklyn Tech, McCaskill became principal of Hillside High School in New Jersey, where in 2013, he resigned following accusations he spanked a female student.

==== Randy Asher ====
On February 7, 2006, the Department of Education named Randy Asher, founding principal of the High School for Math, Science and Engineering (HSMSE), as interim acting principal. Asher had previously served as Brooklyn Tech's assistant principal in mathematics from 2000 to 2002 before leaving to become founding principal of HSMSE. During his time as principal, the total student enrollment increased from 4,200 to 5,700. In the beginning of January 2017, Asher abruptly left Tech to take on a new position as an NYC Education Department senior advisor to help reduce the Absent Teacher Reserve. Throughout Asher's tenure, the school's reputation was sullied by several allegations of sexual harassment and assault of students by faculty members, resulting in the termination of Sean Shaynak (an aerospace engineering teacher hired by Asher) and the reassignment of English teacher and school newspaper advisor David Lo. The school was also rocked by allegations of racism against black students and Asher faced mounting student pressure on social media to fix the situation. Following Asher's departure, former assistant principal David Newman took on the new position as acting principal of the specialized high school. In February 2020, Newman was appointed principal.

== Building and facilities ==
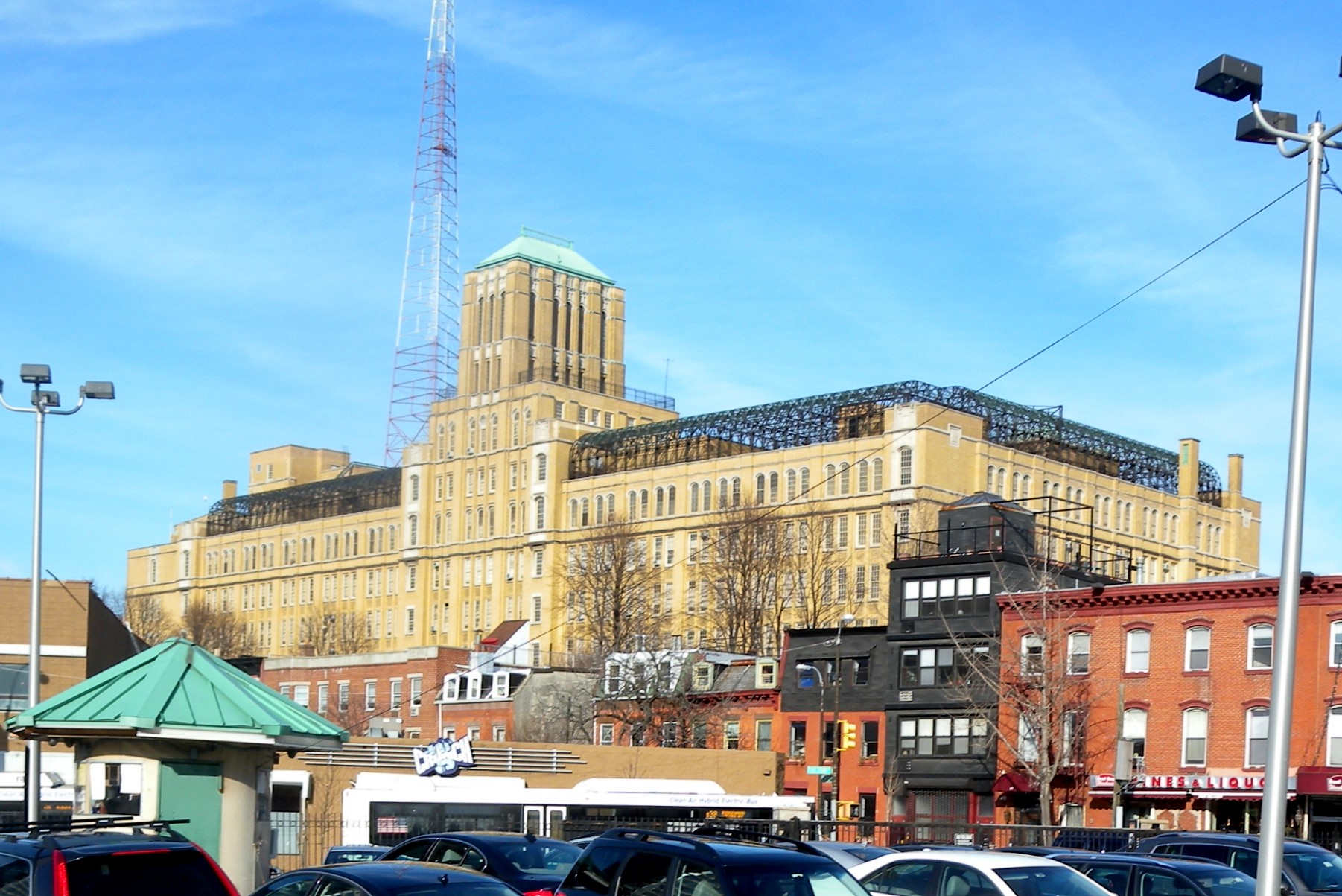
Brooklyn Tech as seen from Ashland Place in Fort Greene

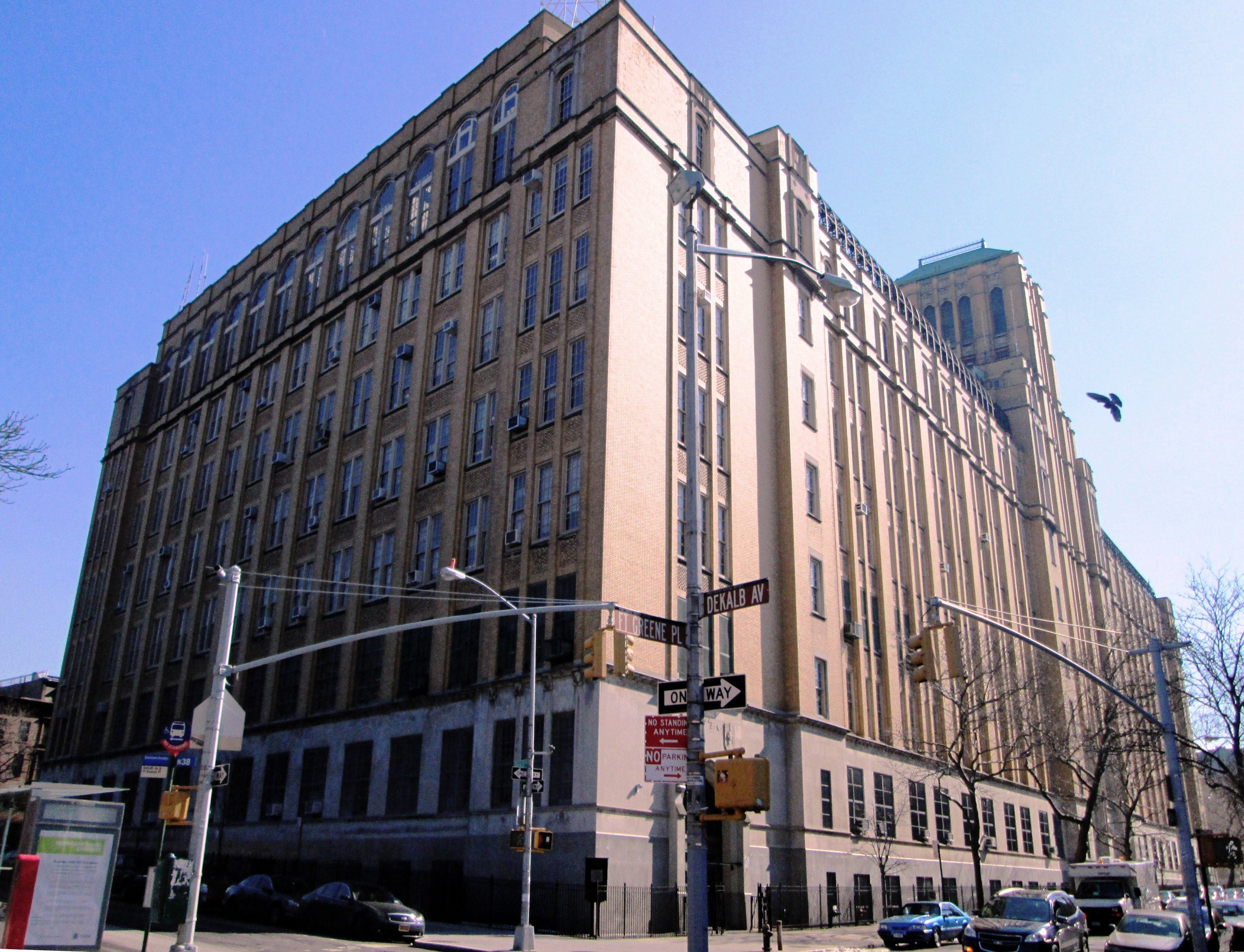
Brooklyn Tech as seen from the corner of DeKalb Avenue and Fort Greene Place

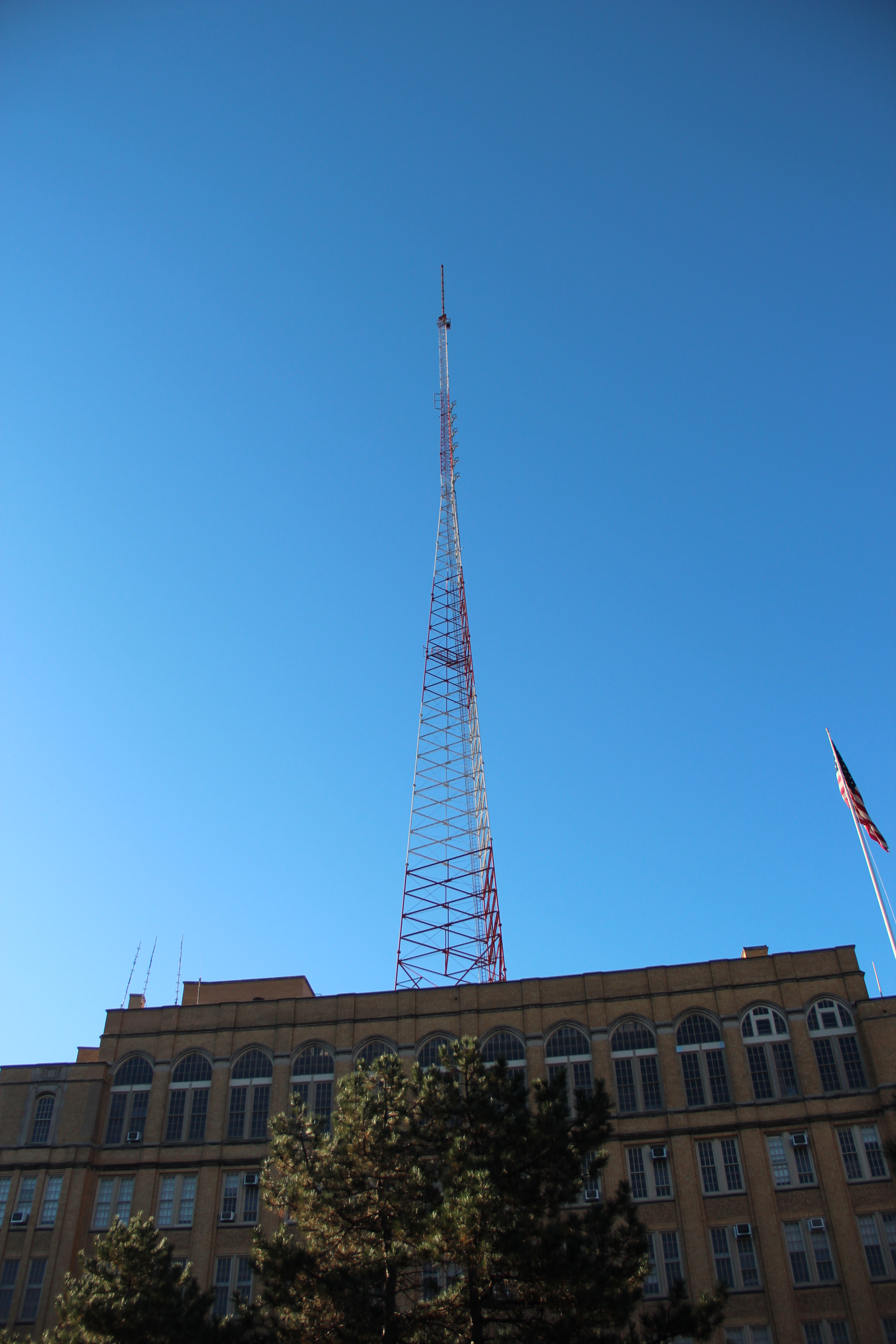
The 420-foot WNYE-FM transmitting tower atop the school

The school, built on its present site in 1932 at a cost of $6 million, is 12 stories high, and covers over half a city block. Brooklyn Technical High School is directly across the street from Fort Greene Park. Facilities at Brooklyn Tech include:

- Gymnasia on the first and eighth floors, with a mezzanine running track above the larger first floor gym and a weight room in the third floor boys locker room. The eighth floor gym had a bowling alley lane and an adjacent wire-mesh enclosed rooftop sometimes used for handball, golf and for tennis practice.
- 25-yard swimming pool in the basement
- Wood, machine, sheet metal and other specialized shops. A program involves a shop where an actual house is built and framed by students. Most have been converted into normal classrooms or computer labs, except for a few robotics shops, such as the Ike Heller Computer Integrated Manufacturing and Robotics Center.
- A foundry on the seventh floor, with a floor of molding sand used for creating sand casting molds and equipped with furnaces, kilns, ovens and ancillary equipment for metal smelting. Students made wooden patterns in pattern making, which were used to make sand molds which were cast in the foundry and machined to specification in the machine shops. It was closed in the late 1980s.
- Materials testing lab, used during the basic materials science (Strength of Materials) class. Included industrial capacity Universal Testing Machine and brinell hardness tester and polishing and microscopic examination rooms. During the 1960s, students attended "inspection training shop" and were taught to use x-ray analysis to detect metal fatigue failures, use of vernier measuring instruments, micrometers, and go-no-go gauges.
- Aeronautical lab, featuring a large wind tunnel, During the 1960s, a T-6 Texan U.S. Air Force surplus aircraft in the building was used for student aeronautical mechanic instruction.
- Radio studio and 18,000 watt transmitter licensed by the Federal Communications Commission as WNYE (FM). The studio has not been used since the 1980s.
- 3,100-seat auditorium, with two balconies—the 4th largest auditorium in New York City
- Recital hall on the ninth floor
- Drafting, both pencil and ink technical drawing and freehand drawing rooms
- Library with defunct fireplaces
- Football field on Fulton and Clermont Streets. The Football Field, named in honor of Brooklyn Tech Alumnus Charles Wang, was opened in 2001, with the home opener played October 6, 2001, against DeWitt Clinton High School.
- Access to Fort Greene Park for outdoor track, tennis, etc.
- Mock courtroom for use by the Law & Society major and the Mock Trial Team.
- The 420-foot WNYE-FM tower atop the school is three times taller than the building. The entire structure combined is 597 feet (182 meters) tall. It was the tallest structure in Brooklyn, beating out AVA DoBro by only one foot, but beaten in 2017 with the completion of The Hub, which is 13 feet taller.
- In 1934, the Public Works of Art Project (PWAP), which later became the Works Projects Administration (WPA), commissioned artist Maxwell B. Starr to paint a mural in the foyer depicting the evolution of man and science throughout history.

== Transportation ==
The New York City Subway's Fulton Street (G train) and Lafayette Avenue (C train) stations are located nearby, as well as more BMT and IRT services at DeKalb Avenue and Atlantic Terminal, which also serves the Long Island Rail Road. Additionally, New York City Bus's B25, B26, B38 and B52 routes stop near Brooklyn Tech. Students residing more than half a mile from the school are provided student OMNY cards for public transportation on their first day of school at Brooklyn Tech, as well as the first day of each school year onward.

== Academics ==
Brooklyn Tech uses a college-style system of majors, unusual for an American high school. Below is the list of majors at Brooklyn Tech.

- Aerospace Engineering
- Applied Mathematics
- Architectural Engineering
- Biological Sciences
- Chemistry
- Civil Engineering
- Electrical Engineering
- Environmental Science
- Finance
- Industrial Design
- Law & Society
- LIU PharmD
- Neuroscience
- Mechatronics & Robotics
- Media Communications
- Physics
- Social Science Research
- Software Engineering

Students are placed into a major during the second semester of their sophomore year after ranking all the majors in order of preference. These majors include courses, typically Advanced Placement or Project Lead the Way (PLTW) courses, that concentrate in that specific area of interest given to students during their last two years at Tech. Each major has a different formula (PI index) used to rank students according to their ranking preference of the majors and their current averages from freshman and sophomore year. A student with a higher PI index for their second preference if they did not get into their first, will get priority over another student with a lower average on the same major preference.

Bret Stephens, an opinion columnist, wrote in The New York Times that "The success of Brooklyn Tech only casts an unflattering light on every other corner of the public school bureaucracy."

== Extracurricular activities ==
Brooklyn Tech fields 30 junior-varsity and varsity teams in the Public School Athletic League (PSAL). The school's historic team name has been the Engineers. The school colors are navy blue and white. The school's more than 100 organizations include the Brooklyn Tech Amateur Radio Club (club station call sign W2CXN), Civil Air Patrol Brooklyn Tech Cadet Squadron, chess, debate, football, wrestling, forensics (speech), hockey, mock trial, robotics, and rowing teams and clubs, and The Survey, the official school newspaper. Student media at the school also includes Tech News Network (TNN), a student-run multimedia broadcast journalism outlet associated with The Survey that was established in 2025. Tech has a literary art journal, Horizons, for those who want to express themselves through art, poetry, photography, and prose. The school's Model United Nations team (also known as TechMUN) provides students with a venue for discussing foreign affairs and also hosts a conference each year called TechMUNC. Other clubs cater to a wide range of topics such as public transportation (notably Tech Transit Association, the school's first of such clubs since 1964), anime, the Stock Market, Dance Dance Revolution, ultimate Frisbee, politics, quilting, fashion, debate (which offers Parliamentary, Public Forum, Congress and Policy), table tennis and animal rights. The cheerleading squad is named the Enginettes. In 2012, Tech students created a Junior State of America Chapter at their school. Brooklyn Tech has its own student union, to address issues on a student level. Tech has a variety of community service clubs, such as Key Club, Red Cross Club, and BETA. Tech students put on a play each fall, and a musical each spring.

There are two step teams, Lady Dragons and Organized C.H.A.O.S.

The school has several Coordinators of Student Activities (COSA).

== Notable alumni ==
A list of notable alumni of Brooklyn Technical High School is listed below. Brooklyn Technical High School also has a unique Hall of Fame, which lists alumni who have contributed significantly to STEM. Such alumni are noted below.

- David H. Abramson '61 – Ophthalmic Oncology Surgeon (2019 Hall of Fame inductee)
- Gary Ackerman '60 – United States Representative, New York (1983–2013)
- Warren Adler '45 – novelist
- James Amrhein - '42 - Executive director of the Masonry Institute of America
- David Antin '50 – poet, art critic, professor
- Maurice Ashley '83 – Chess Grandmaster (2018 Hall of Fame inductee)
- Henry L. Bachman –President of IEEE in 1987. Vice President of BAE Systems
- Clayton W. Bates '50 – Physicist and electrical engineer
- Muyinatu Bell '02 – Professor of Biomedical Engineering, Electrical and Computer Engineering, and Computer Science at Johns Hopkins University
- Roger M. Bobb '84 – Film producer and television director
- Karol J. Bobko '55 – NASA astronaut (1999 Hall of Fame inductee)
- Mario Cardullo '53 – Inventor, Engineer, Entrepreneur (2019 Hall of Fame inductee)
- George R. Caron '38 – Tail gunner aboard the Enola Gay
- John Catsimatidis '66 – chairman and CEO, Red Apple Group (2018 Hall of Fame inductee)
- Henry Chang '69 – Author
- Harry Chapin '60 – Entertainer, humanitarian (2000 Hall of Fame inductee)
- Tom Chapin '62 – Entertainer, humanitarian
- Lorenzo Charles '81 – Professional basketball player
- Frank A. Cipriani, Ph.D., '51 – President, SUNY at Farmingdale (1998 Hall of Fame inductee)
- Cordell Cleare '85 – New York State Senator
- Ellen Cleghorne '76 – Actress, comedian
- Kim Coles '80 – Actress
- Robert W. Conn '60 – Physicist, President of The Kavli Foundation
- John Piña Craven '42 – Chief Scientist, US Navy Special Projects Office
- Laurie Cumbo '93 – Politician, Commissioner of the New York City Department of Cultural Affairs
- Diane Dixon '82 – U.S. Track and Field Olympic gold medalist (1984)
- James E. Dalton '49 – former Chief of Staff, Supreme Headquarters Allied Powers Europe; retired United States Air Force general (1998 Hall of Fame inductee)
- Mike D'Amato '59 – Professional football player for the New York Jets
- Randall T. Eng '65 – Former New York State Presiding Justice (2019 Hall of Fame inductee)
- Tavonia Evans – African-American author, businesswoman, cryptocurrency expert, and educator
- Richard Fariña '55 – Writer, folksinger
- Edward Feiner '64 – Chief architect of the General Services Administration
- Lou Ferrigno '69 – Bodybuilder, actor
- Chris Knowings ‘98 - actor, best known for Sesame Street
- Warren Foster '23 – Cartoon music composer
- Geoff Fox '68 – WTNH meteorologist
- Bernard Friedland '48 – Engineer, professor at New Jersey Institute of Technology
- Elmer L. Gaden c.'40 – "The father of biochemical engineering"
- Patrick Gaspard '84 – president of the Center for American Progress, diplomat
- Robert F. Gatje '44 – Architect, Fulbright Scholar
- Carl Gatto '55 – Alaska House of Representatives from 2003 to 2012
- J. Russell George '81 – Treasury Inspector General for Tax Administration at the Internal Revenue Service
- Gerry Goffin '57 – Brill Building lyricist
- George Stanley Gordon '44 – Advertising executive, professor at University of Connecticut School of Business
- Sidney Gordin, artist, professor
- Meredith Gourdine, Ph.D., '48 – Electrogasdynamics pioneer, '52 Olympic silver medalist (1998 Hall of Fame inductee)
- Francis Grasso '67 – Early disco DJ
- Jay Greene '60 – Chief Engineer at the NASA's Johnson Space Center
- David Groh '58 – actor (Rhoda)
- Gary Gruber, Ph.D., '58 – Author, physicist, testing expert
- Arthur Hauspurg – former chairman of Consolidated Edison
- Isaac Heller '43 – toy manufacturer who co-founded Remco (2013 Hall of Fame inductee)
- Herbert L. Henkel '66 – former chairman of Ingersoll Rand Corporation
- Tommy Holmes '35 – Major League Baseball player (2019 Hall of Fame inductee)
- Joseph J. Jacobs, Ph.D., '34 – Author, engineer, humanitarian (2003 Hall of Fame inductee)
- Lamont Jones (basketball, born 1972) '90 basketball player
- Marvin Kitman '47 – Author, Newsday television critic (1998 Hall of Fame inductee)
- Donald L. Klein '49 – Inventor (1999 Hall of Fame inductee)
- Miss Ko '03 – Songwriter and rapper
- Joseph J. Kohn, '50 – Mathematician (2000 Hall of Fame inductee)
- Jerome Krase – Sociology professor at Brooklyn College and President, European Academy of Sciences of Ukraine
- Richard LaMotta '60 – Founder of Chipwich, ice cream sandwich company
- Jerry Landauer – investigative journalist with The Wall Street Journal
- Akasha Lawrence-Spence '06 – Oregon State Senator
- Joseph Lechleider – Inventor of the DSL Internet Technology
- Baldwin Lee '68 – photographer
- Ivan Lee '99 – Olympic saber fencer
- Al Lerner '51 – Businessman, ran MBNA and former owner of the Cleveland Browns
- MSgt. Meyer S. Levin '34 – Decorated Army Air Force hero, World War II (1999 Hall of Fame inductee)
- Melvyn R. Leventhal – Civil rights lawyer
- Harvey Lichtenstein '47 – Executive Director, Brooklyn Academy of Music (1967–99) (1999 Hall of Fame inductee)
- Turk Lown – Major League Baseball player
- Joe Machnik '60 – Soccer player, coach
- Roy Mankovitz – Rocket scientist, lawyer, inventor, entrepreneur
- Robert Wellesley Mann '42 – Medical prosthetics pioneer (2018 Hall of Fame inductee)
- Jack Maple '70 – New York City Deputy Police Commissioner for Crime Control Strategies (1994–1996) and developer of CompStat process; completed high school equivalency after dropping out
- Richard Matheson '43 – Author, screenwriter
- Barry Mayo '70 – Radio executive
- George E. McDonald (union leader) – Newspaper union leader
- Eugene McDonnell '43 – Computer science pioneer, contributor to the APL language
- Matthew F. McHugh '56 – U.S. Congressman (1975–93)
- L. Londell McMillan '83 – Entertainment attorney
- Conrad McRae '89 – Professional basketball player
- Everett Mendelsohn '49 – Historian of science, professor of the History of Science at Harvard University
- Richard Mollica '89 – Writer, Professor of Psychiatry at Harvard Medical School
- Anthony "Tony" Moran '82 – DJ, remix/record producer
- Saverio "Sonny" Morea '50 – American aerospace engineer, former NASA employee, and flight instructor. He managed the development of the Rocketdyne F-1 and Rocketdyne J-2 for the Apollo program Saturn V rocket, as well as the Lunar Roving Vehicle.
- Zellnor Myrie '04 – New York State Senator
- Richie Narvaez '82 – Author
- Sarah Natochenny '05 – Voice actress best known for voicing Ash Ketchum
- Janai Nelson '89 – President and director-counsel of the NAACP Legal Defense Fund
- Mike Nieves – President of the Hispanic Information and Telecommunications Network, deputy Chief of Staff to New York City Council Speakers Christine Quinn, Gifford Miller and Peter Vallone
- Ronnie Nunn '68 – NBA Director of Officials
- Dallas Penn '88 – Urban fashion, sneaker head and internet personality
- Arno Allan Penzias, Ph.D. '51 – 1978 Nobel laureate in physics (2000 Hall of Fame inductee)
- Frederik Pohl '37 – science fiction author, editor and fan; dropped out due to family exigencies during the Great Depression; received honorary diploma in 2009
- Jim Prendergast '34 – Professional baseball player
- Vernon Reid '76 – Musician, Living Colour
- Victor H. Reis '53 – Government official, 2 time Department of Defense Medal for Distinguished Public Service recipient
- Sal Restivo, Ph.D., '58 – Author, researcher (1998 Hall of Fame inductee)
- Leonard Riggio '58 – Chairman, Barnes & Noble (1999 Hall of Fame inductee)
- Robert Christopher Riley '98 – Film actor, best known for his role on Hit the Floor
- A. V. Rockwell '07 – Film director
- Werner Roth '66 – Professional soccer hall-of-famer
- John Rowan '63 – Vietnam War veteran, president of the Vietnam Veterans of America
- Albert Ruddy '48 – Two-time Academy Award-winning producer (2018 Hall of Fame inductee)
- Mark Sarvas '82 – Novelist, book critic
- Steven Sasson '68 – National Medal of Technology and Innovation-winner for work on digital photography (2013 Hall of Fame inductee)
- John P. Schaefer, President Emeritus of the University of Arizona.
- Richard Schwartz '53 – Developer of the GPS Satellite (2013 Hall of Fame inductee)
- Raymond Scott '27 – composer, pianist, engineer
- Irwin Shapiro '47 – Astrophysicist (2013 Hall of Fame inductee)
- Lawrence Sirovich '51 – Mathematician (2018 Hall of Fame inductee)
- Keeth Smart '96 – Men's fencing silver medalist, 2008 Olympics
- Erinn Smart '97 – Women's fencing silver medalist, 2008 Olympics
- Lanny Smoot '73 – Engineer, inventor
- Mark Tatum '87 – Deputy Commissioner and Chief Operating Officer of the National Basketball Association
- Richard Deane Taylor – Illustrator and commercial artist
- Angelo Del Toro – Lawyer and politician
- Paul J. Torpey '55 – Mechanical engineer, president of the American Society of Mechanical Engineers
- Ashok Varadhan '90 – Goldman Sachs Global Banking and Markets Co-Head (2019 Hall of Fame inductee)
- George Wald, Ph.D., '23 – Biologist, '67 Nobel Laureate (1998 Hall of Fame inductee)
- Andre Walker – Fashion designer
- Latrice Walker '97 – New York State Assemblywoman
- Charles B. Wang '62 – Co-founder, Computer Associates International; minority owner, New York Islanders hockey team (2000 Hall of Fame inductee)
- Anthony D. Weiner '81 – United States Representative
- Rudolph H. Weingartner – Philosopher, provost of University of Pittsburgh, dean of Northwestern University's Weinberg College of Arts and Sciences
- Robert Anton Wilson '50 – countercultural writer, futurist and Playboy associate editor
- Jumaane Williams '94 – New York City Public Advocate and former New York City Council member
- Walter Yetnikoff '49 – Attorney and record industry executive
- Paul Yesawich '41 – Professional basketball player, New York Supreme Court Justice
- Aktarer Zaman '10 – Founder of Skiplagged
- Christopher Zarins '60 – Vascular surgeon, author
- Marilyn Zayas '82 – Judge, Ohio's First District Court of Appeals
- Lee David Zlotoff '70 – Television writer, best known for MacGyver

== In popular culture ==
The Brooklyn Tech Cheerleading Squad appeared in the 1988 Spike Lee film School Daze, and a video for the movie, entitled "Da Butt", was shot at Brooklyn Tech.

Lee also used the first floor gymnasium as a shooting location for Jesus Shuttlesworth's, played by Ray Allen, Sportscenter preview in He Got Game..

School interiors for the pilot episode of the 2013 series The Tomorrow People were filmed in Brooklyn Tech. (Subsequent episodes were filmed in Vancouver rather than New York City.)

Brooklyn Tech was also used to film the FOX series Gotham.

The Netflix series Grand Army is also loosely based on Brooklyn Tech.

== See also ==
- Education in New York City
- List of high schools in New York City
