= Hurley (stick) =

Piece of sporting equipment

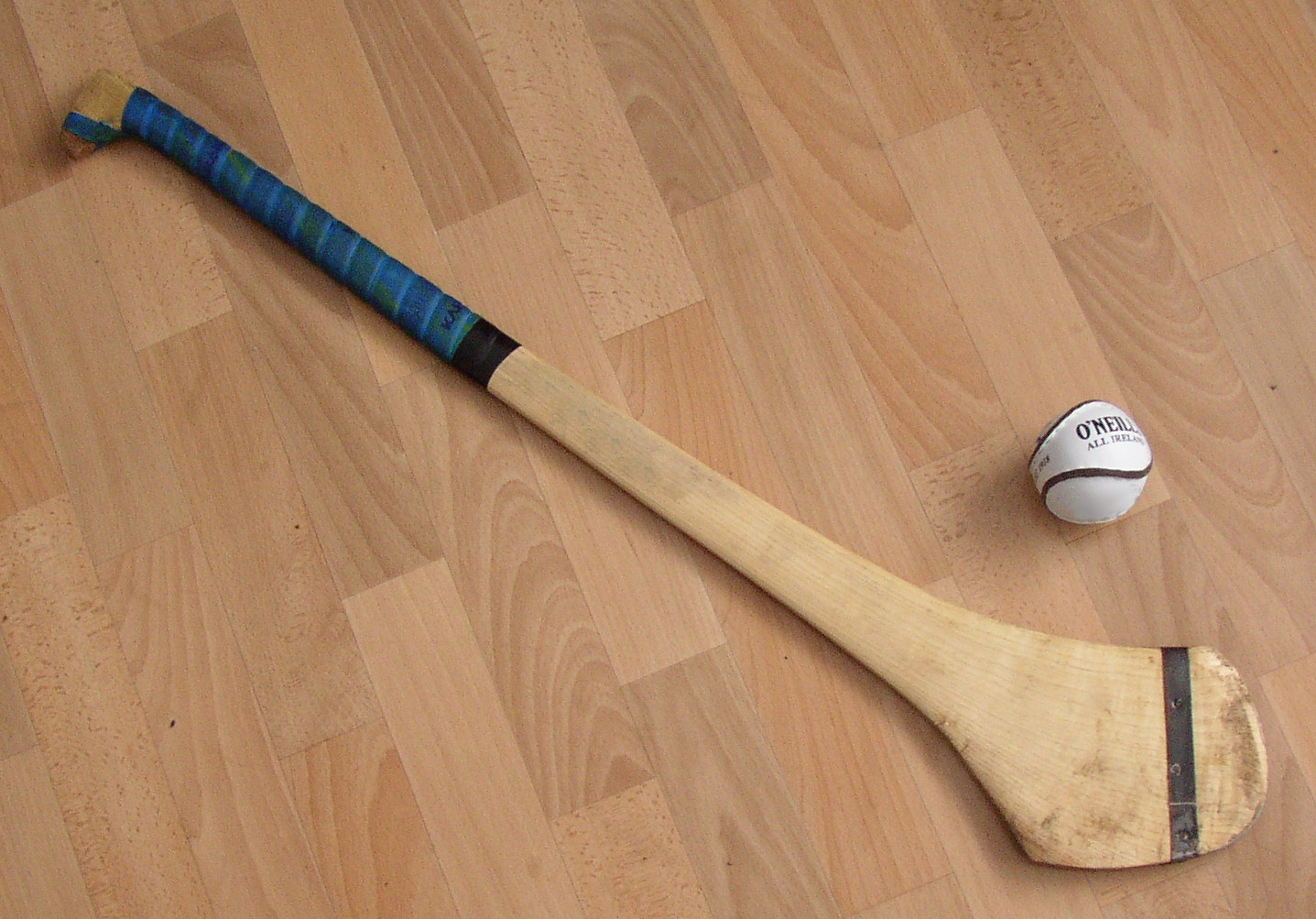
Hurley, with sliotar

A hurley or hurl or hurling stick (Irish: camán) is a wooden stick used in the Irish sports of hurling and camogie. It typically measures between 45 and 96 cm (18 and 38 in) long with a flattened, curved bas ([bˠasˠ] BOSS, "palm of hand") at the end. The bas is used to strike a leather sliotar ball. GAA Rule 4.5 specifies that the bas should be no more than 13 cm at its widest point, but in practice this rule is "ignored completely", with most hurleys having a bas in the region of 15.24 to 17 cm.

== Name ==
Different varieties of Hiberno-English call the stick either a 'hurl' or 'hurley'. There are regional variations, with 22 of Ireland's 32 counties using the term 'hurl' according to a poll in 2020, which found that 97% of people in County Cork preferred the name 'hurley', while 98% of people in County Wexford preferred 'hurl'. The use of the word 'hurl', to refer to the stick, reputedly dates back to at least 1882.

== Form and construction ==
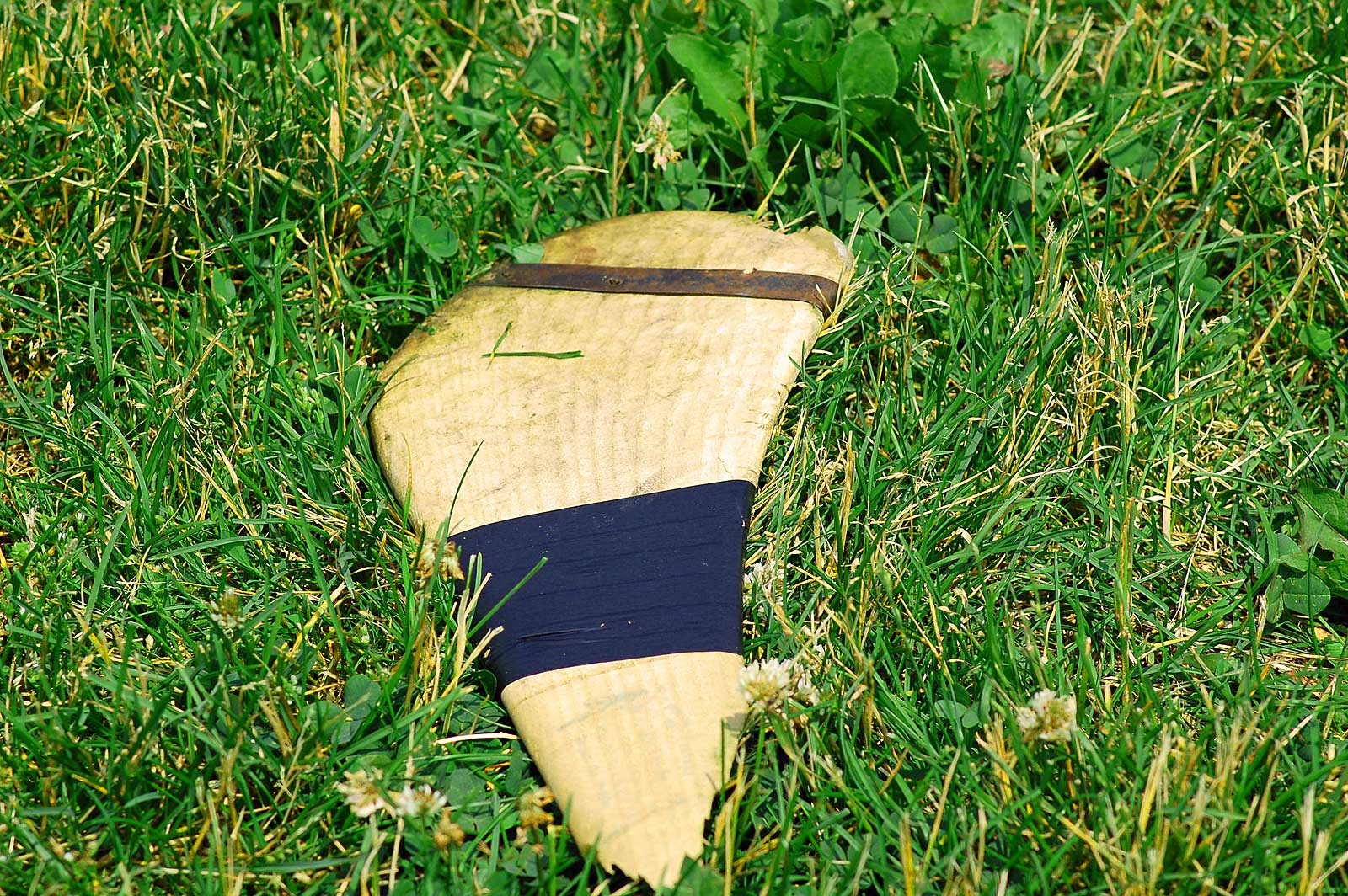
The bas and neck of a broken hurley lies upon the grass

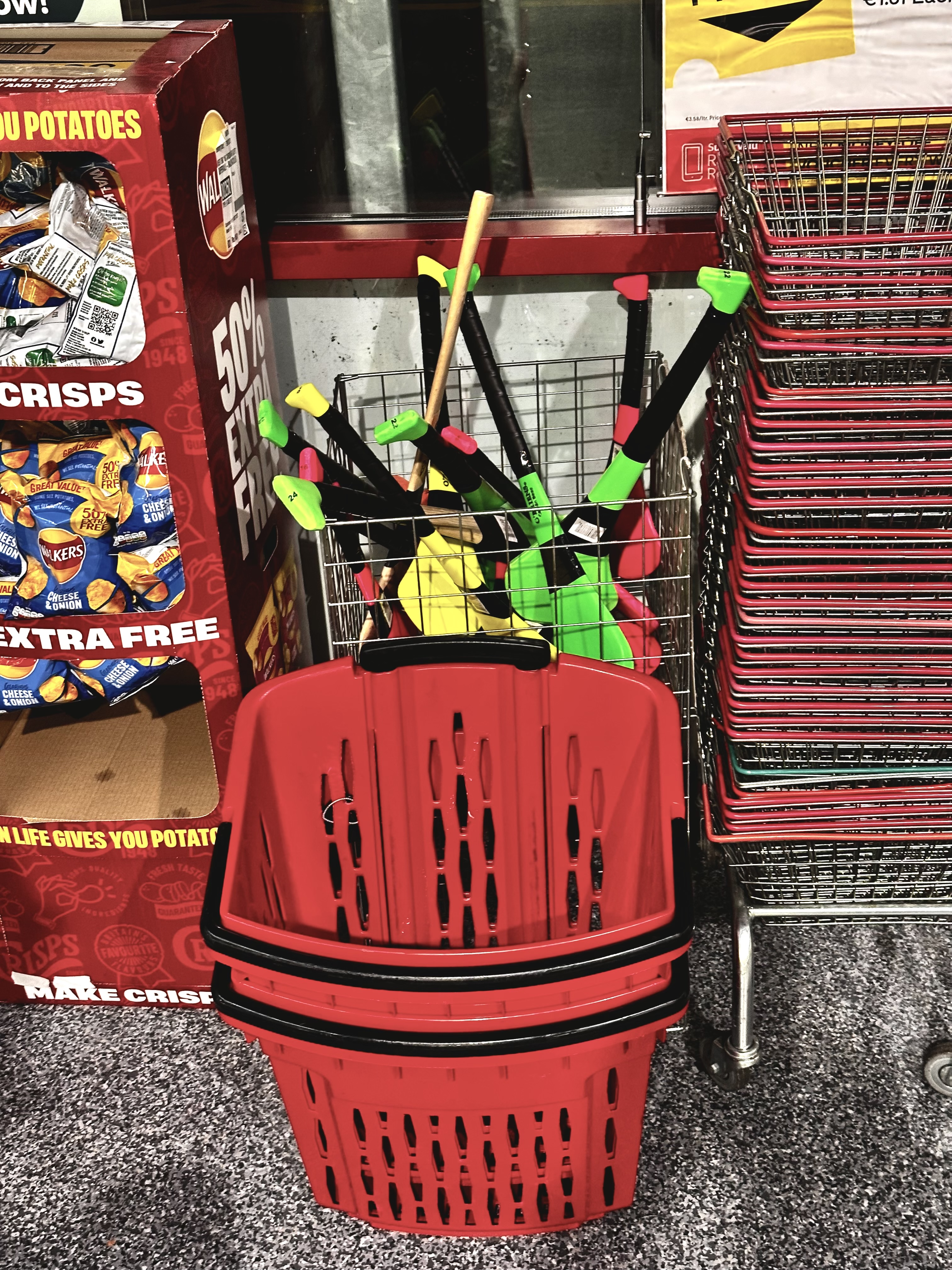
A basket of hurleys for children ("junior hurls") in a local shop in Ireland

Hurleys are typically made from ash wood; the base of the tree near the root is the only part used and is usually bought from local craftsmen in Ireland (for about €20–50), who still use traditional production methods. Beginning in 2020, Torpey began manufacturing bamboo hurleys in response to the effects of ash dieback on ash trees in Ireland.

For some time in the 1970s, hurleys made from plastic were used, mainly produced by Wavin. These proved more likely to cause injury and were phased out. As of 2012, at least one manufacturer was producing synthetic hurleys approved for use by the GAA. On wooden hurleys, steel bands are used to reinforce the flattened end - though these are not permitted in camogie due to increased risk of injury. Bands have been put on hurleys since the beginning; the 8th century Brehon Laws permit only a king's son to have a bronze band, while all others must use a copper band.

No matter how well crafted the hurley is, a hurler may well expect to use several hurleys over the course of the hurling season. The hurleys often break if two collide in the course of a game, or occasionally they break off on the other players (arms, legs, etc.). Two hurleys colliding is colloquially known as "the clash of the ash", a poetic description that has come to be used as a romantic or poetic synonym for the game itself. Some hurleys can be repaired by a method called "splicing". This method involves cutting a bas-shaped piece from another broken hurley and fixing it to the broken bas by way of glue and nails; the two-piece bas is then banded ("hooped") and sanded into shape. (The face of the hurley is called the bas, and is the area used to strike the ball.) Throwing the hurley (e.g., to block a ball going high over one's head) is illegal, though camogie players may drop it to make a handpass.

There are names associated with different parts of the hurley. The bas is the rounded end of the hurley where the sliotar makes contact as it is being struck. At the same end the "heel" of the hurley is the area to the left of the band and at the hurley's edge. It is used to give height to a ball struck on the ground. The rounded area to the right of the band is the "toe" of the hurley and is used in the roll lift or jab lift techniques which allow a player to gain legal possession of a ball into the hand from the ground. The handle is at the opposite end of the hurley to the bas, with the timber cut to form a small lip at the peak (to prevent the hurley from slipping from the player's hand). The handle is typically wrapped with a self-adhesive synthetic foam grip or tape.

When selecting a hurley, choosing the correct size is very important as a hurley that is the incorrect length can be difficult to swing correctly. A correctly sized hurley should be just touching the ground when gripped at the top and held parallel to the player's leg with their arms relaxed. Traditionally it was recommended that the toe of the hurley should reach the player's hip when the heel of the hurley is placed on the ground and held parallel to the player's leg. This has proved inaccurate and unsuitable since two players of the same height can have a difference of 4 inches or 10 centimetres in hip height.

== As a gift ==
The hurley is often given as a gift to or between politicians; for example, Mary McAleese was given two when she was awarded the freedom of Kilkenny in 2009, and Barack Obama was given one by Enda Kenny on his visit to Ireland in 2011. Prince Philip was also given a hurley and sliotar as a gift during Queen Elizabeth II's visit to Ireland.
