= Clayton W. Bates =

American physicist (1932–2024)

Clayton Wilson Bates, Jr.
- Born: 5 September 1932; New York, New York, U.S.
- Died: 18 February 2024 (aged 91); Palo Alto, California, U.S.
- Education: Manhattan College; Polytechnic Institute of Brooklyn; Harvard University; Washington University in St. Louis
- Scientific career
- Workplaces: Stanford University; Howard University
- Notable students: Cammy Abernathy

Clayton Wilson Bates, Jr., (September 5, 1932 – February 18, 2024) was an American physicist and electrical engineer. Bates developed an x-ray image intensifier tube for use in diagnostic radiology and was an early researcher in optical and electronic properties of nanophase metal-semiconductor composite systems. He also chartered Stanford University's Society of Black Scientists and Engineers (SBSE) in 1973.

== Early life and education ==
Clayton W. Bates was born on 5 September 1932 in New York, New York. He grew up in the Harlem neighborhood of New York City, and attended New York Public School 119, New York Junior High School 43, and Brooklyn Technical High School.

Between 1950 and 1954, Bates attended Manhattan College and graduated with a bachelor's degree in electrical engineering. He then went on to earn his first master's degree in electrical engineering from the Polytechnic Institute of Brooklyn (now New York University Tandon School of Engineering). To full his degree at the Polytechnic Institute, he published a thesis titled "Transistor Wide-Band Amplifiers" in June 1956. He subsequently completed a second master's degree in electrical engineering from Harvard University, where he earned a fellowship.

Bates attended Washington University in St. Louis, Missouri, for his doctoral studies, and graduated with a PhD in physics in 1966. There, his studies focused on research on the interaction between radio frequencies and microwave and optical fields with multilevel quantum system.

== Career ==
Bates began his professional career in the private sector, working for companies including Varian Associates, Avco, Sylvania Electric Products, the Ford Instrument Company, and RCA. One of the projects he worked on was designing the nuclear reactor controls of the first SEA WOLF, the second atomic powered submarine. While at Varian Associates in Palo Alto, California, he won the Varian Sabbatical Award in 1971 for his working creating an x-ray image intensifier tube for use in diagnostic radiology.

In 1972, Bates joined the faculty at Stanford University as an Associate Professor of Electrical Engineering and Materials Science. While at Stanford, Bates helped charter the university's Society of Black Scientists and Engineers (SBSE), along with graduate students in the field. The SBSE is a student-run organization and is a chartered member of the National Society of Black Engineers (NSBE). He is currently emeritus faculty in Stanford's Engineering Department. In 1978, he was an associate member of the Stanford/NASA Joint Institute for Surface and Microstructural Research.

In 1984, Bates became professor of material sciences and engineering and was appointed associate dean for graduate education and research at Howard University. At Howard, he established the first interdisciplinary graduate program in materials science and engineering at a historically Black college or university. Bates was a speaker at the 20th anniversary of the establishment of the National Society of Black Physicists in 1997, where he spoke on Materials Sciences. He was also a member of the American Physical Society's Committee on Minorities, along with James Gates.

Bates holds patents spanning from 1986-2012, including an infrared external photoemissive detector.

Bates died on February 18, 2024 in Palo Alto, California, at the age of 91.

== Research ==
At Stanford University, Bates conducted research on the "optical and electronic properties of photoelectronically active surfaces leading to a fundamental understanding of the relationship between the microstructure and properties of the first such surface to be used in practical systems, the S-l photocathode, which had been discovered in 1927."

== Select publications ==
- Double Magnetic Resonance of Coupled Spins, Journal of Applied Physics 38, 2586 (1967)
- Effect of pH on the production of chalcopyrite CuInSe2 prepared by spray pyrolysis, Applied Physics Letters 43, 851 (1983), with Masakaza Uekita, Kim F. Nelson, and Cammy R. Abernathy

== Personal life ==
Clayton Bates was married to Priscilla Bates, and they had three children.
