= Kenneth Breuer =

American professor

- Born: New Brunswick, New Jersey
- Other names: Kenny Breuer
- Education: Brown University; Massachusetts Institute of Technology
- Occupation(s): Professor of Engineering Professor of Ecology, Evolution and Organismal Biology
- Website: https://sites.brown.edu/breuerlab/

Kenneth Breuer is an American academic. He is a Professor of Engineering and Professor of Ecology, Evolution, and Organismal Biology at Brown University and the director of the Center of Fluid Mechanics at Brown University. Breuer is a fellow of the American Physical Society (APS), American Society of Mechanical Engineers (ASME), and Associate Fellow of the American Institute of Aeronautics and Astronautics (AIAA), and a Society of Integrative and Comparative Biology member.

== Early life and education ==
Breuer was born in New Brunswick, New Jersey. He grew up in London before moving back to the United States in 1976. Breuer earned his Bachelor of Science in Mechanical Engineering from Brown University in 1982 and a PhD in Aeronautics and Astronautics from MIT in 1988 under the supervision of Märten Landahl and Joseph Haritonidis. His doctoral dissertation was titled "The Development of a Localized Disturbance in a Boundary Layer".

== Career ==
After completing his Ph.D., Breuer became a postdoctoral fellow in applied mathematics at Brown University with Lawrence Sirovich. He later joined MIT as a faculty member in the Department of Aeronautics and Astronautics, where he worked for nine years before returning to Brown University in 1999. He is currently co-director of the Center for the Mechanics of Undersea Science and Engineering (MUSE).

He was a visiting professor at the University of Queensland in 2005, Harvard University in 2008, Paris Tech in 2015, Imperial College and Tel Aviv University in 2019 and the University of Colorado in 2022.

His research focuses on various topics in fluid mechanics, animal locomotion, and turbulent flows. His work examines bat and bird flight, fluid-structure interactions, vortex dynamics, renewable energy harvesting, bio-inspired engineering, and micro-scale bio-fluid mechanics.

He holds patents related to Kinetic energy harvesting, Sensing and control of flows over membrane wings, and Free streamline airfoils, issued by the European Patent Office and United States Patent and Trademark Office.

Breuer was co-author of Multimedia Fluid Mechanics (Camb. Univ. Press) and co-editor of A Gallery of Fluid Motion (Camb. Univ. Press).

== Awards and honors ==
- Harold and Esther Edgerton Chair at MIT (1996–1998)
- Chair American Physical Society, Division of Fluid Dynamics (2012)
- Associate Fellow, American Institute of Aeronautics and Astronautics (2013)
- Fellow, American Physical Society (2010)
- Fellow, The American Society of Mechanical Engineers (2013)
- Dean's Award for Excellence in Mentoring in Engineering, Brown University (2020)
- Director, Center for Fluid Mechanics, Brown University (2020-Present)
