= George MacDonald (disambiguation) =

George MacDonald (1824–1905) was a Scottish author, poet and Christian minister.

George MacDonald or McDonald may also refer to:

== Politicians ==
- George William McDonald (1875–1950), politician in Manitoba, Canada
- George McDonald (Australian politician) (1883–1951), New South Wales state MP
- George MacDonald (British Columbia politician), former mayor of Penticton, British Columbia; see List of mayors of Penticton
- George MacDonald (Prince Edward Island politician), former mayor of Charlottetown, Prince Edward Island

== Sportspeople ==
- George MacDonald (rower) (1906–1997), Canadian rower and Olympic medalist
- George McDonald (American football) (born 1976), American football coach
- George McDonald (rugby league), New Zealand international
- George McDonald (Australian footballer) (1893–1968), Australian rules footballer

== Others ==
- George Browne MacDonald (1805–1868), father of the MacDonald sisters
- George E. MacDonald (1857–1944), an early 20th-century editor of the Freethought paper Truth Seeker
- George Macdonald (archaeologist) (1862–1940), Scottish archaeologist
- George Macdonald (historian) (1891–1967), New Zealand farmer and historian
- George James MacDonald (public servant) (1805−1851), Commissioner of Crown Lands in New South Wales
- George James Macdonald (naval officer) (1921–1982), New Zealand naval officer, civil engineer and inventor
- George F. MacDonald (1938–2020), Canadian anthropologist and museum director
- George Macdonald (Canadian general) (born c. 1950), Vice Chief of the Defence Staff of the Canadian Forces
- George MacDonald (game designer), founder of Hero Games
- George T. McDonald (1944–2021), founder of the Doe Fund for the American homeless
- George E. McDonald (union leader) (1923–2014), union leader in New York City
- George E. McDonald (architect), American architect
- George McDonald, birth name of Trevor McDonald (born 1939), Trinidadian-British newsreader
- George Macdonald (malariologist), British scientist

== See also ==
- George MacDonald Fraser (1925–2008), author of the Flashman series
- SS George MacDonald (1943), a T3 tanker
