= Roy Mankovitz =

American entrepreneur (1941-2011)

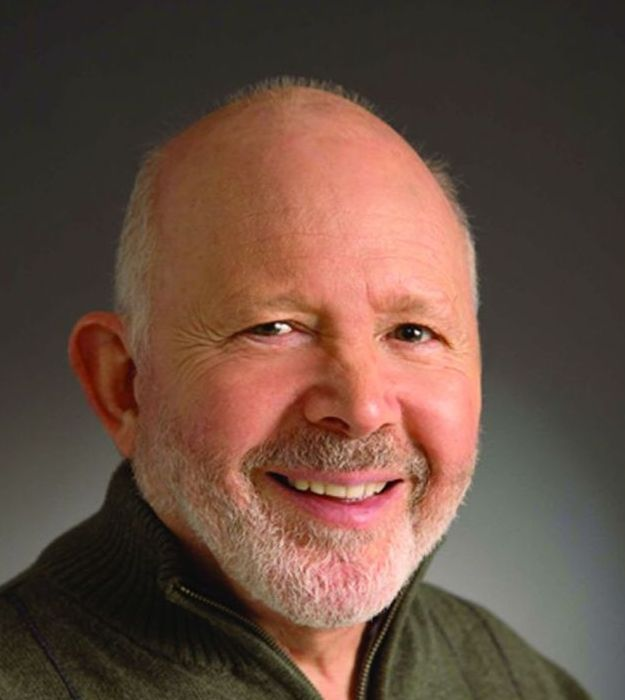
- Born: 1941; New York City, United States
- Died: 2011 (aged 69–70)
- Education: Columbia University
- Occupation: Entrepreneur

Roy Jack Mankovitz (1941–2011) was an American entrepreneur. Mankovitz worked as a lawyer, inventor, entrepreneur, and author.

== Education ==
Born in New York City, Mankovitz attended Brooklyn Technical High School before graduating with a degree in engineering science from Columbia University's School of Engineering and Applied Science. Mankovitz also graduated from the University of LaVerne College of Law with a Juris Doctor degree, was a member of the California and Federal Bar, and a licensed patent attorney.

== Engineering career ==
Mankovitz joined Rocketdyne, then a division of North American Aviation, to design electrical control systems for rockets. He designed and developed engine control systems for Gemini and Apollo spacecraft and the Lunar Descent engine, developed digital solenoid valve drivers that enabled the control of large valves with a minimum of electrical power.

A few years later, Mankovitz joined the Guidance and Control Division at Jet Propulsion Laboratory, where he authored computer programs and designed control systems for Mars landing vehicles and deep space probes. He advanced to become the division representative to the Advance Technical Studies Group and authored several NASA publications in the field. He also served as a consultant to the U.S. Air Force in the evaluation of Soviet spacecraft design. When he began his career in the field of rocket science, the traditional approach to modeling the behavior of spacecraft was to use analog computers as the tool of choice. He chose to replace the analog computer by emulating its behavior on a digital computer, and then proceeding from there.

In 1968, Mankovitz took a position as director of engineering at a division of Teledyne, which produced electromechanical relays, where he developed and patented the first commercially produced solid state relays. Mankovitz was awarded several patents in the field.

== Entrepreneurship ==
Mankovitz co-founded Chardonnay Corporation, which designed and produced remote-controlled systems that automated the operation of spas and swimming pools.

In 1991, Mankovitz joined a start-up company, Gemstar Development Corporation as its in-house intellectual property counsel, as well as a member of its research and development team. During his tenure, he became a director and officer, and built Gemstar into a patent powerhouse in the field of consumer electronics. One of their first projects was VCR Plus, built into virtually every VCR to simplify the recording process by replacing the old one, which was too complicated. Along the way, he assisted in developing the on-screen television guide, widely available from most cable companies, to replace the print guide provided in newspapers. Mankovitz was also the inventor of technology that makes radio listening an interactive experience, a feature destined to be deployed by the broadcast industry.

In 1998, Mankovitz founded Patentlab, LLC, devoted to researching, designing, patenting, and licensing his intellectual property. Mankovitz continued in the field of consumer electronics as co-founder, director, counsel, and Chief Strategy Officer for Web Tuner Corp., a Redmond, Washington, based high-tech startup devoted to the internet and television viewing. He also co-founded Berrynol, Inc. to promote his patented technology in the area of topical photo-protective preparations.

== Legal career ==
From 1980 to 1991, Mankovitz was a member of several intellectual property law firms, including Reagin and King, Karon, Morrison and Savikas, and Christie Parker and Hale. From 2001 to 2005, Mankovitz assisted Acacia Research Corp. in refining their business model, aimed at protecting and monetizing the patent rights of companies and individuals, spawning an entire industry devoted to doing just that.

He served as their senior vice president of intellectual property and provided licensing and litigation strategy to assist the company in acquiring and exploiting intellectual property portfolios.

== Personal ==
Mankovitz resided in Montecito, California, with his wife Dr. Kathleen Barry. He had three children, Jill Hurwitz, Alan Mankovitz and Andrea Mankovitz. In 2009, Mankovitz was named vice chair of the Board of Trustees at Antioch University in Santa Barbara, California. He died on July 10, 2011.
