= David H. Abramson =

American scientist and athlete

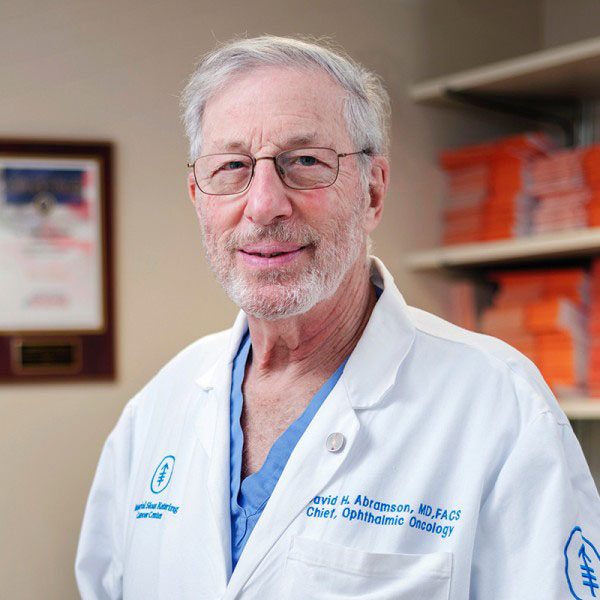
- Dr. David H. Abramson, MD
- Citizenship: American
- Education: Harvard University; Albert Einstein College of Medicine; Columbia University
- Medical career
- Profession: Ophthalmologist
- Sub-specialties: Ophthalmic oncology

David H. Abramson (born February 1944), is a clinician scientist, ophthalmic surgeon, competitive swimmer, and lecturer who has published over 700 peer-reviewed articles in ophthalmology, with a focus on ophthalmic oncology. Abramson was the first chief of the ophthalmic oncology service at Memorial Sloan Kettering Cancer Center, where he is a tenured professor in surgery, pediatrics, and radiation oncology. He is also a professor at Weill Cornell Medicine, where he was the youngest full professor ever appointed in ophthalmology. He pioneered intra-arterial chemotherapy, which cures cancer whilst saving the eye from enucleation, in 2006. He is the recipient of many awards, including the Stallard Medal from the International Society for Oncular Oncology, the Lifetime Achievement Award from the American Academy of Ophthalmology, the Weisenfeld Award from the Association for Research In Vision and Ophthalmology, and the Franceshcetti Medal from the International Society of Genetic Eye Disease in Switzerland.

In addition to his academic pursuits, Abramson was a triple gold medal winner in swimming at the Maccabiah Games in Israel in 1961, set four NCAA records during his time as the Captain of the Harvard University swim team, and was an Olympic alternate in 1960 for the 800 meter relay team. He has been inducted into three halls of fame: the Retina Hall of Fame, the Harvard Varsity Club Hall of Fame, and the Brooklyn Technical High School Hall of Fame.

== Early life ==
Abramson was born in New York, New York. His father, Jack Abramson, was President of a garment company, the Diamond Tea Gown Company, and served on the board of the U.S. Olympic Committee; his mother, Ruth Abramson, was the executive designer for the company and was inducted into the New York University Athletics Hall of Fame for four sports — basketball, field hockey, tennis, and swimming.

== Education ==
In 1961, Abramson graduated from Brooklyn Technical High School where he received the All-Tech Medal.

From there, he went on to Harvard University, where he graduated with an A.B. in Biology in 1965. While he was there, he served as Captain of the Freshman and the Varsity Men's Swimming Teams, where he was a four-time All-American and went undefeated in collegiate competition. He was also a member of the Fly Club and the Hasty Pudding Club while an undergraduate. Upon graduation, he was elected First Marshal of the Class of 1965, a position in which he still serves.

Abramson subsequently enrolled in medical school at the Albert Einstein College of Medicine, and received his M.D. in 1969. He did additional training during residency at the Armed Forces Institute of Pathology in Washington, D.C.

After residency, he received a Heed Fellowship to study Ophthalmic Oncology at Columbia University.

== Career ==
In 1969, Abramson began his internship in medicine at Lincoln Hospital/Albert Einstein Medical Center. The following year, in 1970, he began a residency in Ophthalmology at the Edward S. Harkness Eye Institute at Columbia Presbyterian Medical Center, where he studied under Dr. Robert Ellsworth.

Upon completion of his residency, he completed a Fellowship in Ophthalmic Oncology at Columbia Presbyterian Medical Center.

Post fellowship, in 1974, Abramson joined the staff at Columbia Presbyterian as an attending physician in Ophthalmology.

In 1979, he moved to New York Hospital/Cornell University Medical Center, where he was appointed clinical professor in Ophthalmology. He was also in private surgical practice at this time.

In 2004, he moved to Memorial Sloan Kettering Cancer Center to start the Ophthalmic Oncology service, and has served as Chief of Ophthalmic Oncology since. He continues to serve as a professor at Cornell University, now Weill-Cornell Medical College.

In 2026, Dr. Abramson was awarded with the highest prize in ophthalmic research, the Helen Keller Vision Research Award. With this award, he was named a Helen Keller laureate.
