= James E. Dalton =

United States Air Force general (1930–2024)

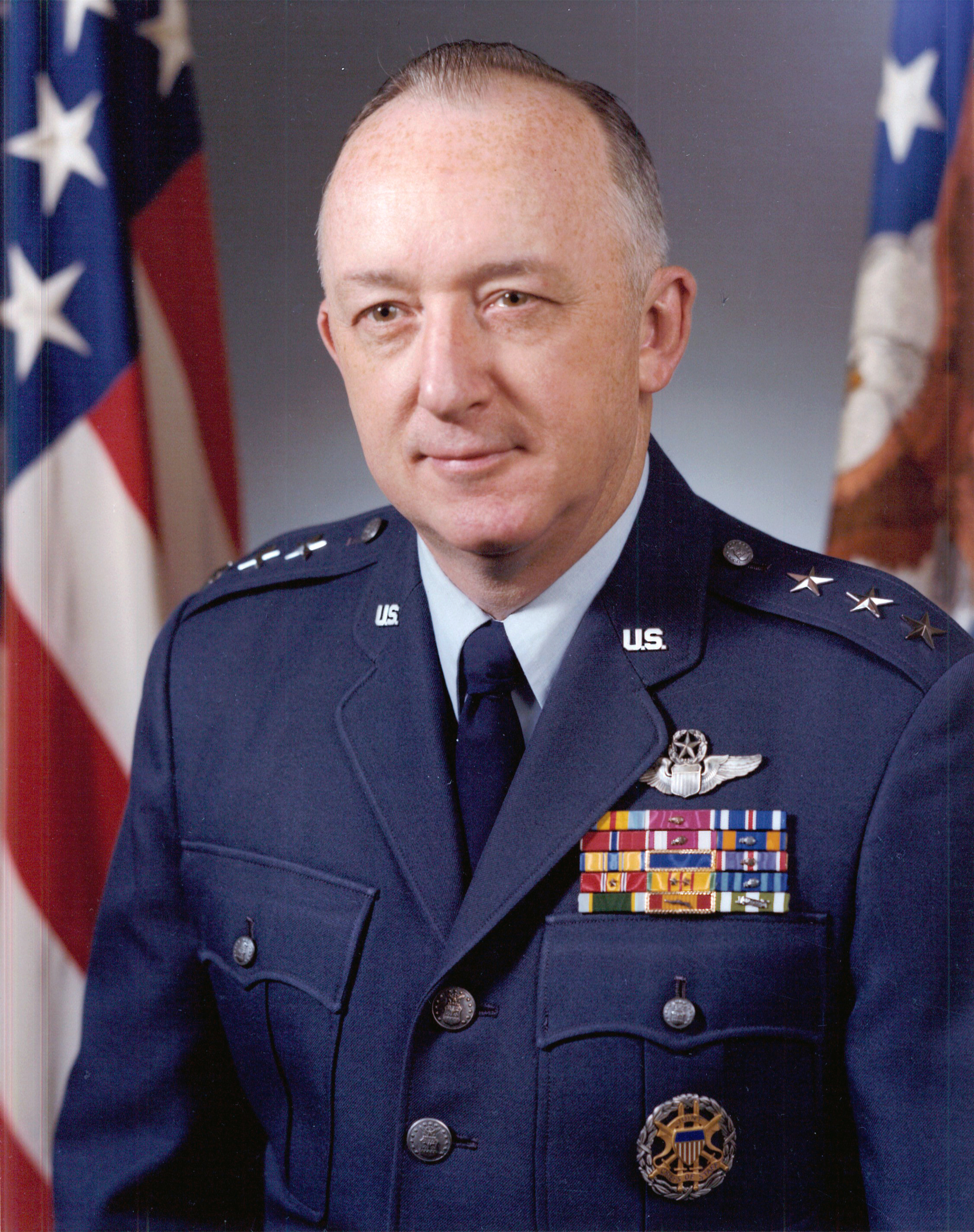
- Dalton as a lieutenant general
- Born: October 17, 1930; New York City, U.S.
- Died: August 4, 2024 (aged 93); Rolling Hills Estates CA, U.S.
- Burial place: Arlington National Cemetery
- Education: University of Michigan
- Military career
- Allegiance: United States
- Branch: United States Air Force
- Service years: 1954–1985
- Rank: General
- Commands: 374th Tactical Airlift Wing; Vice Commander 438th Military Airlift Wing; Air Reserve Personnel Center; Industrial College of the Armed Forces; Supreme Headquarters Allied Powers Europe
- Conflicts: Cold War; Vietnam War

James Edward Dalton (October 17, 1930 – August 4, 2024) was a general and chief of staff of the Supreme Headquarters Allied Powers Europe.

== Biography ==
Dalton was born in New York City in 1930. He was a graduate of Brooklyn Technical High School. In 1954 he graduated from the United States Military Academy, West Point, New York.

After completing pilot training in 1955, Dalton joined the 76th Air Transport Squadron at Charleston Air Force Base, South Carolina, serving as an aircraft commander until he entered the University of Michigan in 1958. After receiving Master of Science degrees in aeronautical and astronautical engineering, and instrumentation engineering from the University of Michigan in 1960, he served as a project officer in the Guidance and Control Directorate of the Ballistic Systems Division, Air Force Systems Command at Los Angeles Air Force Station, California. He was responsible for the development of the operational targeting programs for the inertially guided SM-65 Atlas, Titan and LGM-30 Minuteman intercontinental ballistic missiles.

Dalton attended the Air Command and Staff College during the 1964–1965 academic year and was then assigned to the 374th Tactical Airlift Wing, Naha Air Base, Okinawa, where he served as an aircraft commander, instructor pilot, flight commander and wing executive officer. During this assignment he served in Southeast Asia as a C-130 Hercules commander, operations officer and deputy commander of C-130 operating locations.

From May 1968 to May 1969, he was a project officer in the Missile Division, Office of the Deputy for Strategic Forces, Deputy Chief of Staff, Research and Development, Headquarters United States Air Force, Washington D.C. While there, he was the program element monitor for the Advanced Intercontinental Ballistic Missile Technology Program. He then attended the Industrial College of the Armed Forces, graduating in June 1970.

He was assigned as chief, Qualitative and Quantitative Analysis Branch in the Office of the Assistant to the chairman, Joint Chiefs of Staff for Strategic Arms Negotiations from June 1970 to August 1972. In this capacity he served with the United States Strategic Arms Limitation Talks Delegation as an adviser to the principal military delegate.

Dalton was vice commander of the 438th Military Airlift Wing, McGuire Air Force Base, New Jersey, until May 1973. He then took command of the 39th Aerospace Rescue and Recovery Wing at Eglin Air Force Base, Florida., where he was responsible for the rescue operations of seven squadrons and 14 detachments located in Europe, Iceland, Greenland, Alaska, Panama and the United States. As many as 100 aircraft of five different types were assigned to the wing. During his tenure the wing received the Air Force Outstanding Unit Award and the Military Airlift Command's Distinguished Wing Flying Safety Award for 1973 and 1974.

In February 1975 he became commander of the Air Reserve Personnel Center in Denver, Colorado, where he was responsible for personnel support for the Air Force Reserve and members of the Air National Guard not on extended active duty, and personnel support for mobilization of the Air Reserve Forces.

From November 1976 to May 1977, he was deputy director of concepts in the Office of the Deputy Chief of Staff, Plans and Operations at Air Force headquarters. In June 1977 he was assigned to the Organization of the Joint Chiefs of Staff and served as deputy director for force development and strategic plans, Plans and Policy Directorate. His responsibilities involved a broad range of national security issues. In July 1978 he became vice director of the Joint Staff and in July 1980 he was named commandant of the Industrial College of the Armed Forces. He served as director of the Joint Staff from July 1981 until assuming his duties as chief of staff of the Supreme Headquarters Allied Powers Europe in August 1983.

He was promoted to general on August 1, 1983, and retired twenty three months later to the day. In 1998, he was inducted into the Brooklyn Technical High School Hall of Fame.

Dalton died on August 4, 2024, in Rolling Hills Estates, California at the age of 93 and was interred at Arlington National Cemetery on 19 February 2025.

== Awards and decorations ==
Command Pilot badge with more than 5,400 flying hours
Defense Distinguished Service Medal with an oak leaf cluster
Legion of Merit with 1 oak leaf cluster
Distinguished Flying Cross
Bronze Star Medal
Meritorious Service Medal with 1 oak leaf cluster
Air Medal with 5 oak leaf clusters
Air Force Commendation Medal
Vietnam Service Medal with 6 palms
