= Torpey =

Torpey is a surname. Notable people with the surname include:

- John Torpey (born 1959), American academic, sociologist and historian
- Kaitlyn Torpey (born 2000), Australian women's footballer
- Noel Torpey (born 1971), American politician
- Pat Torpey (1953–2018), American musician
- Paul J. Torpey (1937–2019), American mechanical engineer
- Steve Torpey (footballer, born 1970), English footballer
- Steve Torpey (footballer, born 1981), English footballer
