= Lee D. McCaskill =

American educator

Lee D. McCaskill is a former American educator primarily known for teaching at Brooklyn Technical High School.

== Career ==
McCaskill initially taught worked at the Board of Education starting as a substitute teacher in 1978.

=== Brooklyn Tech ===
In 2003, The New York Times published an investigative article that noted "longstanding tensions" between the faculty and Principal McCaskill, "spilled into the open in October, with news reports that several teachers accused him of repeatedly sending sexually explicit e-mail messages from his school computer to staff members." While the article praised him for his addition of music and sports programs, it mostly described the principal as autocratic, controlling the school "largely through fear and intimidation," and documented acts of personal vindictiveness toward teachers; severe censorship of the student newspaper and of assigned English texts, including the refusal to let the Pulitzer Prize-finalist novel Continental Drift by Russell Banks be used for a class; and of bureaucratic mismanagement. A follow-up column in 2004 found that there was increased teacher exodus, specifically documenting Principal McCaskill's campaign against Alice Alcala, who described as one of the city's leading Shakespeare teachers. Alcala had won Brooklyn Tech a $10,000 grant and brought in the Royal National Theatre of Great Britain for student workshops, but after Alcala had done so, McCaskill repeatedly denied her access to the auditorium and gave her low performance rankings. Shortly after, Alcala left for Manhattan's Murry Bergtraum High School, where she brought in $1,800 in grants for Shakespeare education; meanwhile, at Brooklyn Tech, there was no longer any course solely devoted to Shakespeare, according to the column.

In two newspaper articles in 2005, it was revealed that a $10,000 grant obtained by Dr. Sylvia Weinberger in 2001 to refurbish the obsolete radio studio remained unused. New classroom computers were covered in plastic rather than installed because the classrooms had not yet been wired for them.

The Office of Special Investigations of the New York City Department of Education launched an investigation of McCaskill on February 2, 2006, concerning unpaid enrollment of Piscataway, New Jersey resident McCaskill's daughter in a New York City public school, which is against policy for non-residents of the city. Dr. McCaskill produced a lease claiming that he rented an apartment in Brooklyn, but the copyright date on the lease was after the signatures were dated. On February 6, McCaskill announced his resignation from Brooklyn Tech and agreed to pay $19,441 in restitution.

A week later special commissioner Richard J. Condon rebuked the Department of Education for allowing McCaskill to retire, still collecting $125,282 in accrued vacation time, just days before the OSI completed its investigation. The next day, the Department of Education announced that it would fire both he and his wife, a New York City teacher at the time, for the scandal of covering up their daughter's enrollment in an out-of-state school.

There have been numerous claims of racism used against him in his resignation from Brooklyn Tech.

=== Hillside High School ===
After retiring from Brooklyn Tech, McCaskill became principal of Hillside High School in New Jersey, where in 2013, he resigned four years later.
