= Joseph Lechleider =

American inventor

Joseph W. Lechleider (22 February 1933, Brooklyn – 18 April 2015) was the inventor at the Bell Telephone Company of the DSL (digital subscriber line) technology.

In 1992, Joseph Lechleider was elevated to the grade of IEEE fellow for contribution to the theory and practices of high-speed digital subscriber lines.

== Early life ==
Lechleider attended Brooklyn Technical High School before earning his undergraduate degree from Cooper Union and a Ph.D. from the Polytechnic Institute of Brooklyn (now part of the New York University Tandon School of Engineering.
