= Rudolph H. Weingartner =

American philosopher (1927–2020)

Provost of the University of Pittsburgh
- In office 1974–1989
- Preceded by: Roger Benjamin
- Succeeded by: Donald M. Henderson

Dean of the Weinberg College of Arts and Sciences
- In office 1974–1987

Personal details
- Born: February 12, 1927 Heidelberg, Germany
- Died: November 16, 2020 (aged 93) Mexico City, Mexico
- Education: Columbia University (BA, PhD)
- Profession: Philosopher; Academic administrator

Rudolph Herbert Weingartner (February 12, 1927 – November 16, 2020) was an American philosopher and academic administrator. He served as provost of the University of Pittsburgh and dean of Northwestern University's Weinberg College of Arts and Sciences.

== Biography ==
Weingartner was born on February 12, 1927, in Heidelberg, Germany, and came to the United States at the age of 12 with his parents. His family settled in New York City, and Weingartner attended Brooklyn Technical High School before serving in the United States Navy in 1945, serving in the Pacific Theater following the surrender of Japan. He then received his bachelor's, master's, and doctoral degrees from Columbia University.

He began his academic career at San Francisco State University and then served as chairman of the philosophy department at Vassar College. He then became a full-time administrator, serving as dean of the College of Arts and Sciences at Northwestern University for 13 years. He was provost of the University of Pittsburgh from 1987 to 1989 and taught philosophy there until his retirement.

He received a Guggenheim Fellowship in 1965. Weingartner died on November 16, 2020, in Mexico City at age 93.

His academic and professional books include:

Experience and Culture: The Philosophy of Georg Simmel (1962)

The Unity of the Platonic Dialogue: The Cratylus, The Protagoruas, the Parmenides (1973)

Undergraduate Education: Goals and Means (1992)

Fitting Form to Function: A Primer on the Organization of Academic Institutions (1996)

The Moral Dimensions of Academic Administration (1999)

He wrote about his life in Mostly About Me (2003) and A Sixty-Year Ride though the World of Education (2007)
