= Richard Mollica =

American academic and writer

Richard Francis Mollica
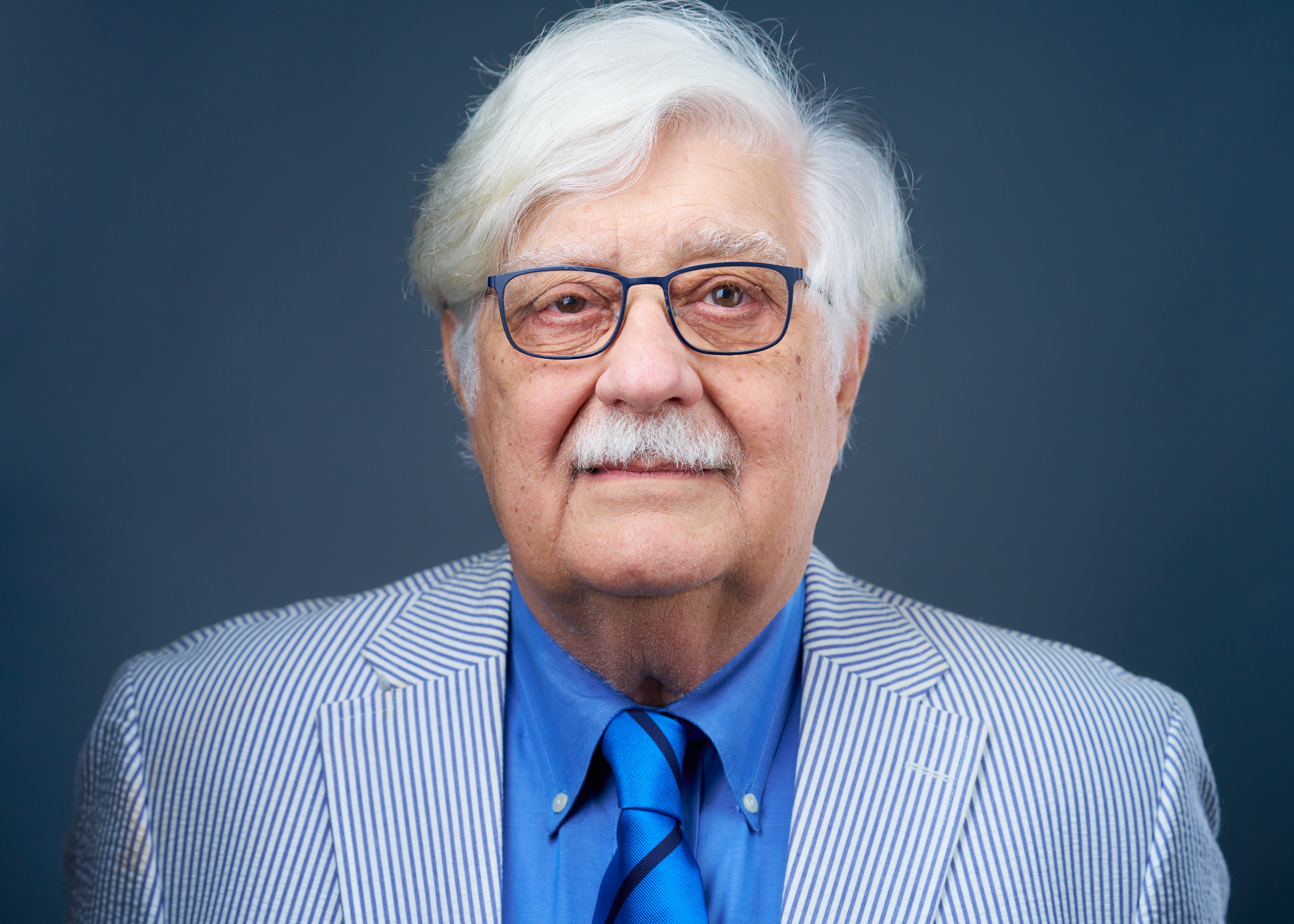
- Mollica in 2024
- Born: December 20, 1946 (age 79); Bronx, New York, US
- Education: Reed College; University of New Mexico School of Medicine; Yale School of Medicine; Yale Divinity School
- Occupations: Professor, researcher, writer, educator
- Spouse: Karen Carlson
- Children: 2

Richard F. Mollica (born December 20, 1946) is an American academic and writer. He is the Professor of Psychiatry at Harvard Medical School and Director of the Harvard Program in Refugee Trauma at Massachusetts General Hospital. His research focuses on Psychological trauma and recovery. Mollica has published over 160 scientific manuscripts, and has published Healing Invisible Wounds (2006) and Manifesto IV Healing a Violent World (2018). In 2022, he received the lifetime award from Harvard Medical School, and in 2023, the Lux et Veritas Award from Yale Divinity School

Mollica is considered a pioneer and founder of a new field of medicine Refugee Mental Health. He started one of America's first refugee clinics in Boston in December 1981.

The scientific and clinical work of Mollica and the Harvard Program in Refugee Trauma has served as a global model worldwide and has been replicated in many countries including the US, Australia, Canada, Italy, Bosnia Herzegovina, Haiti, and Ukraine.

== Early life ==
Mollica was born in South Bronx. His grandparents were poor Italian immigrants. His mother was raised in a convent, and struggled with depression. His father was blind as a result of meningitis. Mollica's childhood was influenced by his love for books, and he excelled in mathematics and sciences at Brooklyn Technical High School. He further went to Reed College in Portland, Oregon, where he finished his basic education.

After studying at the University of New Mexico School of Medicine and a neurology internship at the University of Toronto, Mollica went to Yale University in 1974 for his psychiatric residency and also attended the Yale Divinity School. After the residency, Mollica joined Harvard as a psychiatrist. He later opened a refugee clinic.

Amongst his researches, he advocates integrating Trauma-informed care into primary healthcare, despite resistance from primary physicians due to time constraints and lack of training. He introduced into medicine and the human rights field the concept of the Trauma Story in 1988. The Trauma Story is a key element in the Trauma-informed care of all patients who have survived traumatic life experiences.

== Awards and honors ==
- 2022 Lifetime Achievement Award, Harvard Medical School
- 2023 Lux et Veritas Award, Yale Divinity School

== Selected publications ==
=== Books ===
- Healing Invisible Wounds: Paths to Hope and Recovery in a Violent World, 2006
- 2012 Trauma Story Assessment and Therapy: Journal for Field and Clinic
- 2012 Textbook of Global Mental Health: Trauma and Recovery, A Companion Guide for Field and Clinical Care of Traumatized People Worldwide
- 2012 Sun and Moon, A Khmer Journey Comic adapted and illustrated by Doug Anderson
- 2018 A Manifesto: Healing a Violent World
- 2022 Manifesto IV Healing a Violent World: The Will to Heal and Survive in an Apocalyptic World

=== Book chapters ===
- 1988 The Trauma Story: The Psychiatric Care of Refugee Survivors of Mass Violence and Torture in Post-Traumatic Therapy And Victims Of Violence by Frank M. Ochberg (pp. 295–314)
- 2015 The New H-5 Model of Refugee Trauma and Recovery in Violence and Mental Health: Its Manifold Faces by J. Lindert and I. Levav (Eds) (pp. 341–378)
- 2019 The New H-5 Model: Trauma and Recovery in Humanitarianism and Mass Migration: Confronting the World Crisis by Marcelo Suarez-Orozco (Ed) (pp. 123–136)
- 2021 Culturally Adapted Therapeutic Approaches: The Healing Environment and Restorative Therapy Model in Refugee Mental Health by Dr. Jamie D. Aten PhD and Jenny Hwang (Eds) (pp. 137–166)
- 2023 The Shamanistic Enclave: Building Refugee Healthcare Practitioners with M. Leister and L. Charks in Refugees, Refuge, and Human Displacement by Ignacio López-Calvo and Marjorie Ajosin (pp. 179–194)

=== Most cited papers ===
- The Harvard Trauma Questionnaire. Validating a cross-cultural instrument for measuring torture, trauma, and posttraumatic stress disorder in Indochinese refugees
- Indochinese versions of the Hopkins Symptom Checklist-25: a screening instrument for the psychiatric care of refugees
- Longitudinal study of psychiatric symptoms, disability, mortality, and emigration among Bosnian refugees
- Mental health in complex emergencies
- The Harvard trauma questionnaire: adapting a cross-cultural instrument for measuring torture, trauma and posttraumatic stress disorder in Iraqi refugees
- Disability associated with psychiatric comorbidity and health status in Bosnian refugees living in Croatia
- The effect of trauma and confinement on functional health and mental health status of Cambodians living in Thailand-Cambodia border camps
- The psychosocial impact of war trauma and torture on Southeast Asian refugees
- Effects of war trauma on Cambodian refugee adolescents' functional health and mental health status
- Brain structural abnormalities and mental health sequelae in South Vietnamese ex-political detainees who survived traumatic head injury and torture
- The HTQ-5: revision of the Harvard Trauma Questionnaire for measuring torture, trauma and DSM-5 PTSD symptoms in refugee populations
- The physical and psychological sequelae of torture. Symptomatology and diagnosis
- The enduring mental health impact of mass violence: a community comparison study of Cambodian civilians living in Cambodia and Thailand
- High Prevalence of Post-Traumatic Stress Symptoms in Relation to Social Factors in Affected Population One Year after the Fukushima Nuclear Disaster
- A community study of formal pastoral counseling activities of the clergy. Am J Psychiatry
- From asylum to community. The threatened disintegration of public psychiatry
- Surviving torture
- Beyond Burnout: Responding to the COVID-19 Pandemic Challenges to Self-care
- Mental and physical exhaustion of health-care practitioners
- Educational potential of a virtual patient system for caring for traumatized patients in primary care
- Equity and the psychiatric care of the black patient, 1950 to 1975
- Making strides towards better mental health care in Peru: Results from a primary care mental health training
- Social class and psychiatric practice: a revision of the Hollingshead and Redlich model
- Surviving without the asylum. An overview of the studies on the Italian reform movement
- Cultural dimensions in the evaluation and treatment of sexual trauma. An overview
- Waging a new kind of war. Invisible wounds
- Overview: Ethical issues in contemporary psychiatry
- When racial trauma is a chief complaint among health-care staff
