= Frank A. Cipriani =

Frank A. Cipriani was the fifth president of SUNY Farmingdale. He served as president from 1978 to 2000 during the school's shift in focus to higher education in biotechnology.

Cipriani graduated from Brooklyn Technical High School and has a doctorate from New York University.
