= John P. Schaefer =

American college administrator

John P. Schaefer is President Emeritus of the University of Arizona, where he had an active, 21-year career in teaching and research. He graduated from Brooklyn Technical High School and Polytechnic Institute of Brooklyn (now NYU Polytechnic School of Engineering).
