= Tavonia Evans =

American author, businesswoman, and educator

Aquarius Maximus (Tavonia Evans)
- Education: North Carolina A&T and Central Georgia Technical College
- Occupations: Author & Businesswoman
- Organization: Guapcoin
- Website: Website: https://www.aquariusmaximus.me

Aquarius Maximus formerly known as Tavonia Evans is an American author, businesswoman, cryptocurrency expert, and educator. She is the founder and creator of the cryptocurrency Guapcoin.

== Life ==
Evans was raised in Amityville, and is a graduate of Brooklyn Technical High School. She attended North Carolina A&T, and Central Georgia Technical College.

Evans started her career as a graphic artist and went on to develop websites for celebrities. She later worked as a software engineer for the Department of Veterans Affairs, the Georgia Department of Education, and AT&T. In 2014 she founded Safe2meet, a peer to peer safety verification platform. During this time she also became well known as the astrologer and cardologer Aquarius Maximus on Facebook and Instagram.

In 2017, she launched Guapcoin, a decentralized cryptocurrency primarily directed at closing the wealth and technology gap for the global African diaspora. She is an African American cryptocurrency expert. She lives in Atlanta.
