= Lawrence Sirovich =

American mathematician

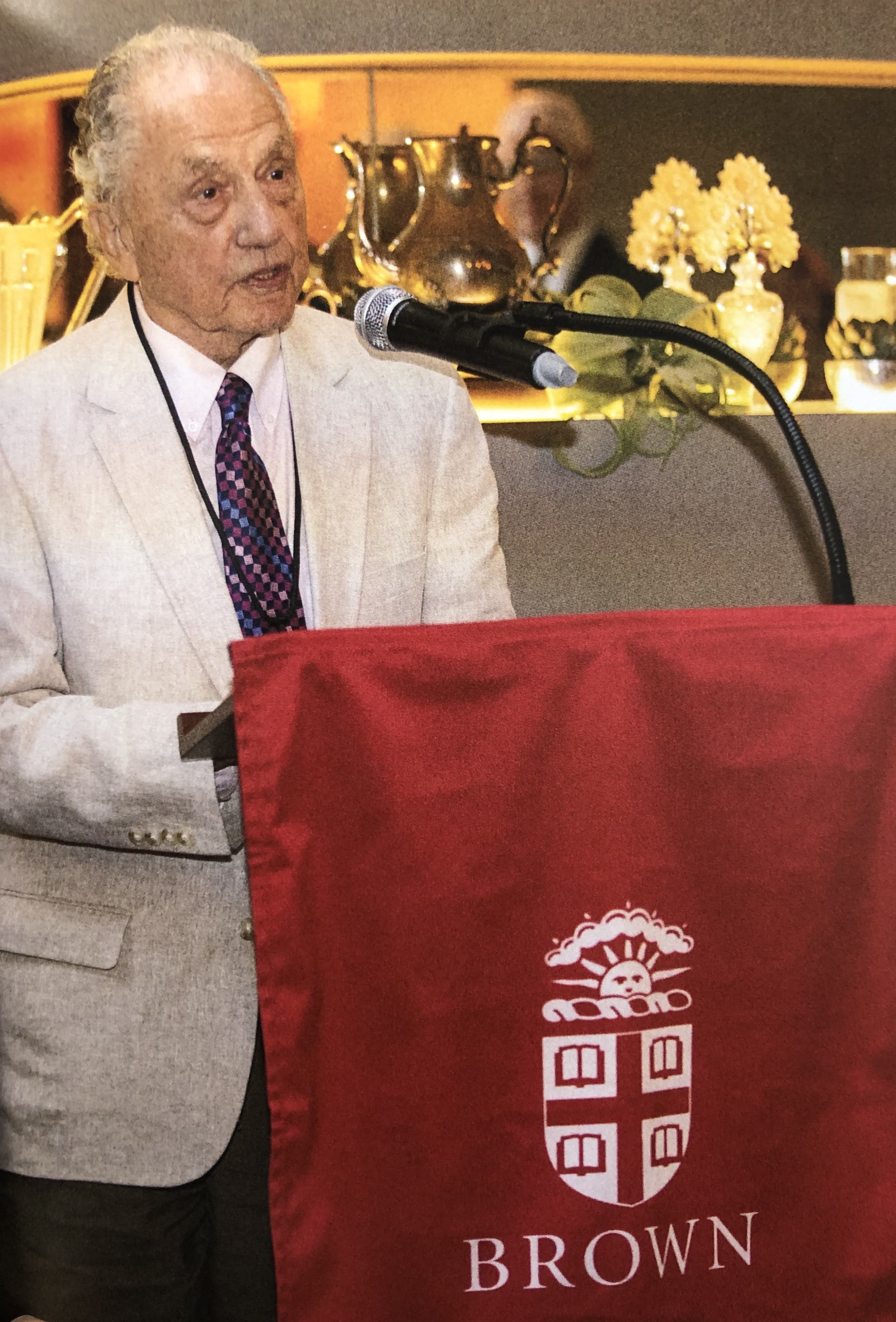
- Born: March 1, 1933 (age 93); Brooklyn, New York, United States
- Education: Johns Hopkins University
- Known for: Face recognition; Eigenfaces; Reduced dynamic systems; Method of snapshots; US Supreme Court Analysis
- Awards: Fulbright Scholarship; Guggenheim Fellow; Fellowship, American Association for the Advancement of Science; Member, American Institute of Physics
- Scientific career
- Fields: Applied Mathematics
- Workplaces: New York University; Brown University; Université Libre de Bruxelles; Institut Henri Poincaré; University of Paris; Yale University; Icahn School of Medicine at Mount Sinai; The Rockefeller University
- Academic advisors: Francis Clauser, JHU; Harold Grad, NYU

Lawrence Sirovich is mathematical scientist whose research includes, among other topics, applied mathematics, neuroscience and physics. He is recognized as the pioneer behind modern face recognition, and is known for eigenfaces, the method of snapshots, low dimensional dynamical systems, analysis of the US Supreme Court, neuronal population dynamics, and the faithful copy neuron.

== Early life and education ==
Sirovich was born to Jewish immigrants from Poland and raised in Brownsville, a working-class immigrant neighborhood of Brooklyn, New York. He gained entrance to the Brooklyn Technical H.S., an experience which first opened his eyes to the possibilities of the world. There he was captain of the math team and years later, in 2018, inducted into the BTHS Hall of Fame. Sirovich attended Johns Hopkins University as an undergraduate math major, and as a graduate student in aeronautical engineering (where applied mathematics was practiced). In 1958, jointly with Johns Hopkins University, he became a research assistant at the Courant Institute at NYU. It was there that he wrote his PhD dissertation "On the Kinetic Theory of Steady Gas Flows" in 1960. At the Courant Institute, K.O. Friedrichs, a mathematician of great insight and taste, was his most influential teacher. For Sirovich, taking a course with Friedrichs on asymptotics was a life-changing experience. Another early mentor at the Courant Institute was Fritz John, a mathematician of the highest character with whom Sirovich later started the eminent Applied Mathematical Sciences series, of Springer-Verlag Publishing.

== Research ==
Sirovich's early research was in kinetic theory, its connection with fluid mechanics, and such areas of fluid mechanics as supersonic flow and turbulence. A turning point in Sirovich's research came with his reading of Jim Watson's The Double Helix, which caused Sirovich to realize that he was not engaged in the heroic research of his time. This prompted participation in a Cold Spring Harbor summer course on biology, and eventually led to his close association with H. Keffer Hartline's Laboratory of Biophysics at the Rockefeller University, and a long collaboration with Bruce W. Knight, the present head of the laboratory. As a maturing scientist, Sirovich's research interests took on an element of serendipity ("chance confers an advantage on the prepared mind", Louis Pasteur). For example, a chance remark on the failure of the standard description of the horseshoe crab's lateral eye neural network at its boundaries led to a Wiener-Hopf solution to the problem, with complete experimental agreement. An article by Linda Greenhouse in the New York Times led to "A pattern analysis of the second Rehnquist U.S. Supreme Court." An observation that human faces, are always different, but are always recognizable as a face; and likewise that images of turbulence had the same property of being different, and being recognizable as turbulence led to a successful model of face recognition, and also served as an analysis model for turbulence. The former led to Sirovich's establishing the subject of face recognition. Allied to this was the notion of low dimensional dynamical descriptions of turbulence in standard geometrical settings. In a series of three papers on the subject, Sirovich established the field of low dimensional dynamical models.

== Personal life ==
Sirovich met Carole Hochman, a number theorist, at the Courant Institute. Their first date took place on September 4, 1960, and they married October 16th, 1960. Carole received her PhD from the Courant Institute and later became Chair of the Department of Math and Science at the Pratt Institute, which she retired from in 2017.

Their daughter Brenda Sirovich was born in 1963, and received a B.A. in math and biology from Harvard. She is the co-director of the VA Outcomes Group at Dartmouth's Geisel School of Medicine. Their son Matthew was born in 1966. Matt studied math and economics at Brown University, and is currently a board member there.

In 2018 Mathew Sirovich honored his parents by endowing the Carole & Lawrence Sirovich Chair of Public Health at Brown University.
