= Paul J. Torpey =

American mechanical engineer (1937–2019)

Paul J. Torpey (1937-2019) was an American mechanical engineer and former executive at ESEERCO research cooperation. He served as 113th president of the American Society of Mechanical Engineers (ASME) in the year 1994-95.

Paul Torpey was a recognized leader in the mechanical engineering profession. During his distinguished career, he made significant contributions to the electric utility industry at companies including Bell Telephone Labs and Consolidated Edison Company (Con Edison) of New York as well as organizations including the Electric Power Research Institute (EPRI) and the Empire State Electric Energy Research Corporation (ESEERCO). He was also active within the engineering professional society community, as evidenced by his many years of leadership service in ASME.

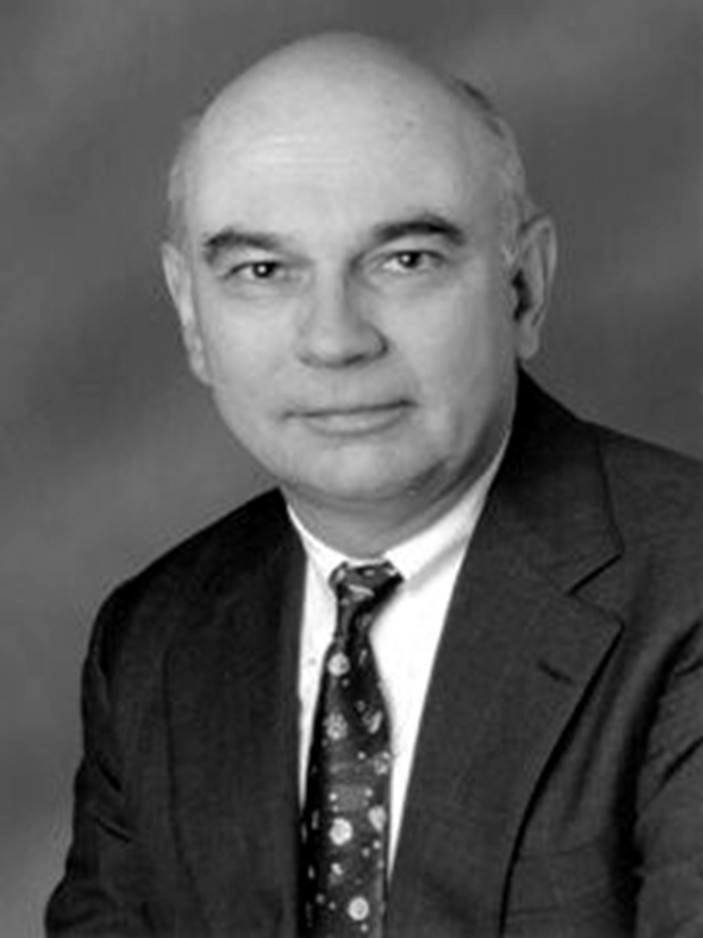
Paul Torpey, 113th President of the American Society of Mechanical Engineers

== Biography ==
Torpey graduated from Brooklyn Technical High School in 1955. He studied mechanical engineering at Columbia University, where he obtained his BSc in 1959, and his MSc in 1960.

After graduation in 1960, Torpey started his career at the Bell Telephone Laboratories, Inc. (Bell Labs) in New Jersey. While at Bell, he was influential in the development of aircraft derivative gas turbines used to provide backup power for the United States’ telecommunications network.

In 1970, Torpey joined Con Edison where he helped the company launch one of the earliest electric utility research departments. He worked on a variety of projects related to environmental control, advanced energy conversion, robotics, energy conservation and renewable resources.

During the 1970s, he was also a key figure in the formation of the EPRI and ESEERCO— two energy organizations that have conducted extensive research exploring efficient energy utilization, environmental protection, cleaner advanced energy sources, and improved methods for the transmission and distribution of electric energy. Torpey, who assumed the role of ESEERCO’s administrator in 1974, steered that organization through its evolution from a group focused on nuclear research into a research consortium that conducted a wide range of electric energy research projects for the electric utilities in New York State. He served as its administrator from 1974 to 1976, and was executive director from 1988 to his retirement in 1999.

Outside of the power industry, Torpey established himself as a prominent leader during his nearly 60 years as an ASME member. He served as the Society’s 113th president in 1994-1995, and held a number of prominent ASME leadership positions, including member of the Board of Governors from 1989-1993, ASME’s vice president of research from 1984-1988, chair of the Society’s Leadership Development Initiative from 1992-1997, chair of the Fellows Review Committee from 2002-2004, and member of the ASME Auxiliary from 1994-1996. Following his presidency, he was also active in the History and Heritage Committee, the ASME Research Board and the Committee on Staff.

Torpey received the ASME Centennial Medal and Dedicated Service Award in 2008 for his work with the Society, and was named an ASME Honorary Member in 2011 for “outstanding leadership in the electric utility research field that significantly advanced modern power systems, and for enlightened and insightful activities in engineering societies that improved the quality of the profession.”

Paul married Phyllis A Robinson in 1962. They had one child, Mark R. Torpey and four grandchildren—Matthew R. Torpey, Jacob R. Torpey, Benjamin J. Torpey and Mark S. Torpey. Torpey died on Aug. 26, 2019, at his home in Greenport, N.Y. He was 80 years old.

== Selected publications ==
- Torpey, P. J., "Noise control of emergency power generating equipment." Amer. Ind. Hyg. Ass., J. 30, 596 (1969).
- Paul J. Torpey. "Establishing the longitudinal temperature distribution for fully developed turbulent flow in a gas turbine exhaust duct," Conference Paper, in: Papers, ASME, The Society, 1970. p. 81-89
- Torpey, P. J. "Mini computerizing analog data collection." Control Eng. 17(6), 69, June 1970.
- Torpey, Paul J. "Collaborative R&D Helps Companies Stay Productive," Mechanical Engineering-CIME, Vol. 116, No. 10. (October 1994)
