= George E. McDonald (union leader) =

American union leader (1923–2014)

George E. McDonald (20 June 1923 – 20 April 2014) was a union leader as head of the New York Allied Printing Trades Council, the combined representatives of New York City's newspaper unions. McDonald had once worked as a stacker and bundler in the New York Times mailroom, oversaw six strikes, although attempting to avoid them.

McDonald graduated from Brooklyn Technical High School and tried out for the Brooklyn Dodgers in 1941. He served as a submariner in the United States Navy during World War II.
