= Edward Feiner =

American architect (1946–2022)

Edward Feiner (October 16, 1946 – July 1, 2022) was an American architect. He was the chief architect of the General Services Administration from 1996 to 2005, after joining the GSA in 1981.

== Career ==
After earning his master's degree from Catholic University of America, he joined the Navy's planning department in 1969 and left to join the GSA in 1981.

While with the GSA, he created the "Design Excellence" program with Marilyn Farley which is widely seen as improving the federal government's selection process of architects for government projects by making the talent of the architect a larger aspect of the criteria. In 2003, the federal government was planning to spend $20 billion for upcoming buildings, with Feiner being in involved with all of them.
