= The Hub (building) =

Residential skyscraper in Brooklyn, New York

Coordinates: 40.687290°N 73.981168°W

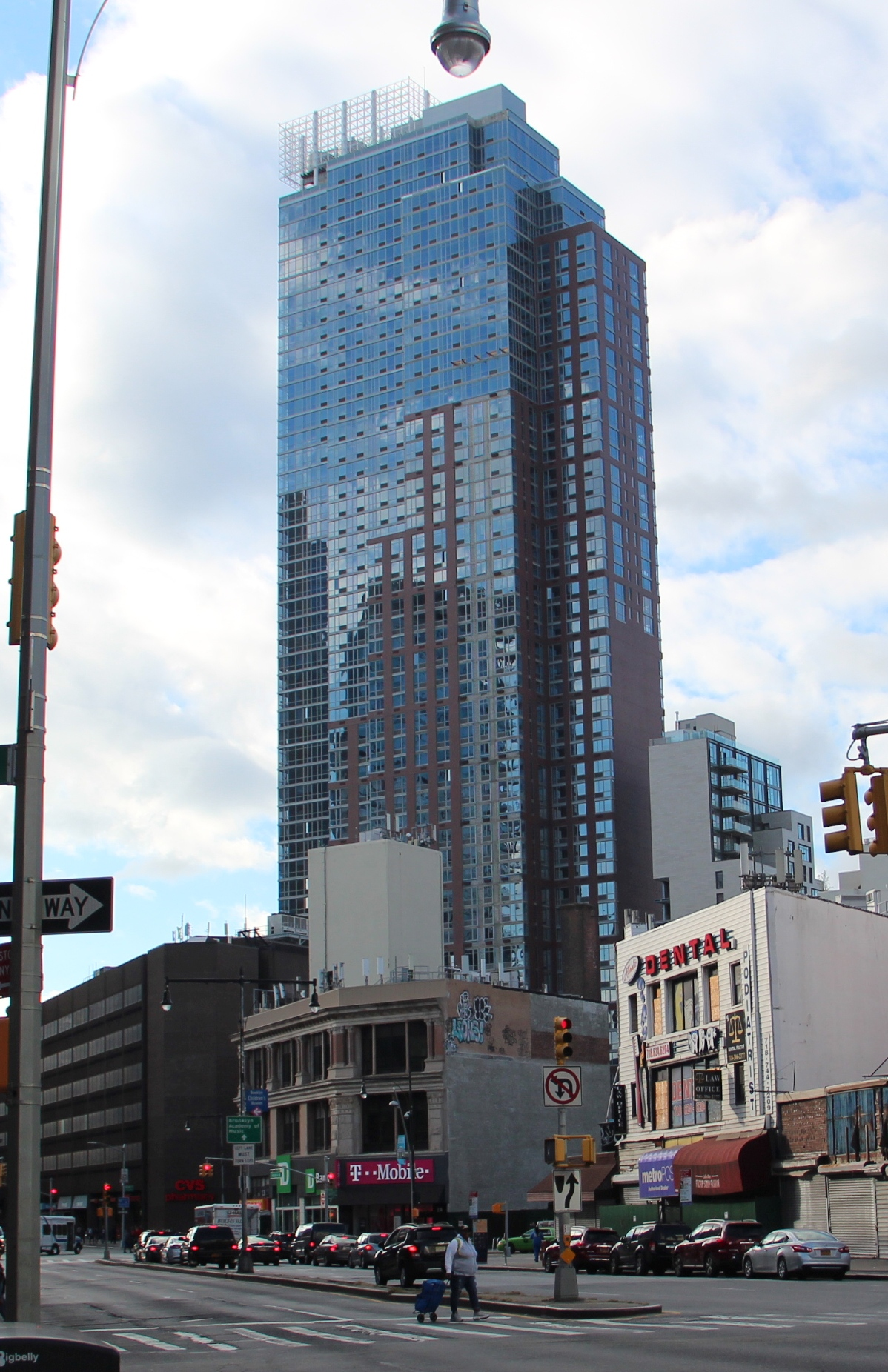
- Interactive map of the The Hub area

General information
- Type: Residential
- Architectural style: Postmodern
- Location: 333 Schermerhorn Street, Brooklyn, New York 11217
- Construction started: 2014
- Completed: 2016
- Owner: Steiner NYC

Height
- Antenna spire: 610 ft (186 m)
- Roof: 602 ft (183 m)

Technical details
- Floor count: 55

Design and construction
- Architects: Dattner Architects; Goldstein Hill & West Architects, LLP
- Developer: Steiner Equities Group

Website
- http://hubbk.com

The Hub, also known as 333 Schermerhorn Street, is a 610-foot, 55-floor skyscraper in the Downtown Brooklyn neighborhood of Brooklyn, New York City. The building contains 754 apartments, four high-rise elevators and three mid-rise elevators.

The Hub was the tallest building in Brooklyn when it topped out in December 2015, passing previous record-holder, AVA DoBro, until it was passed in turn by Brooklyn Point, within the City Point complex, in April 2019. In March 2025, Steiner NYC became the Hub's sole owner after buying out the ownership stake of its partner, JPMorgan.

== Gallery ==
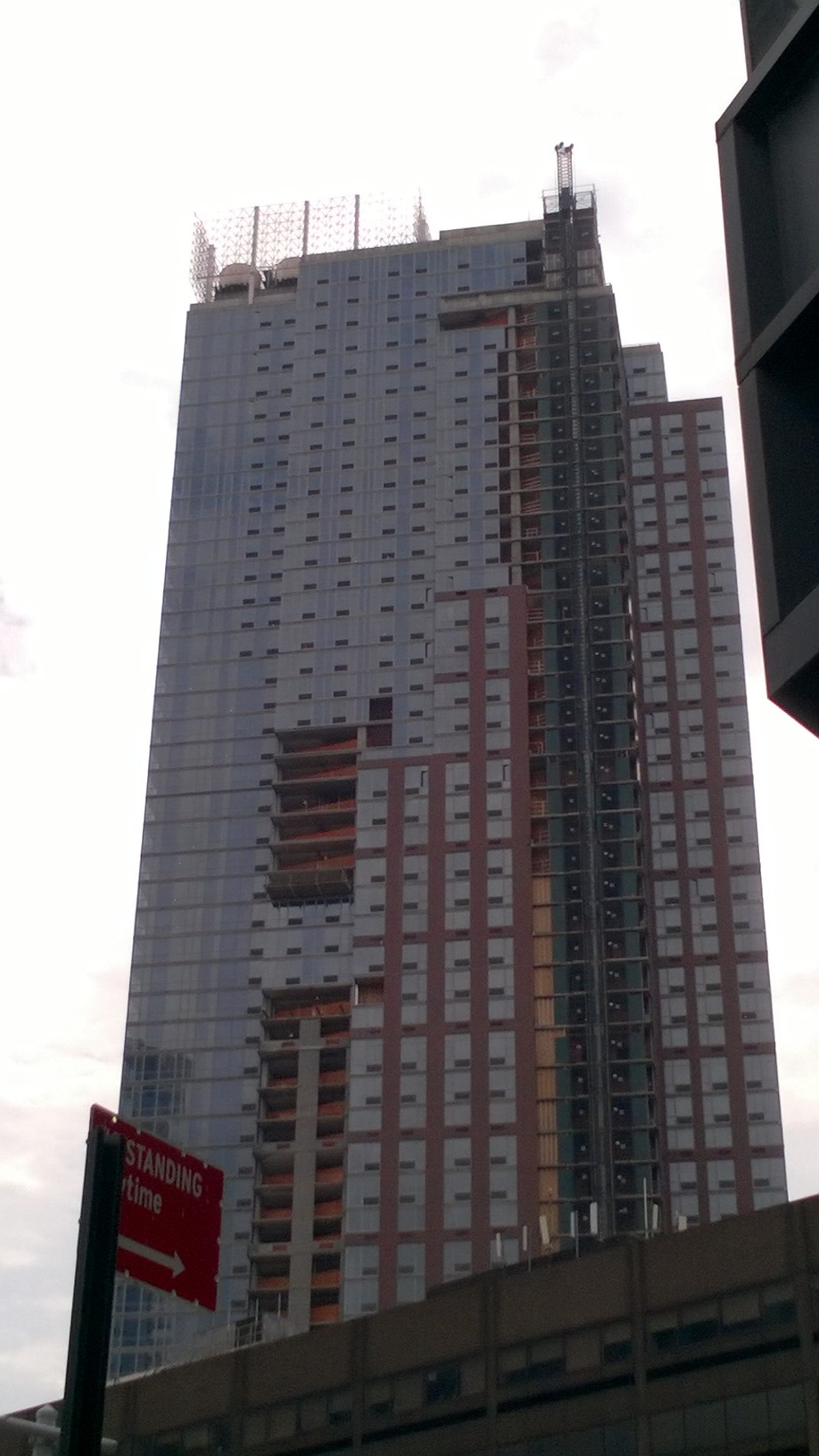
Facade under construction in September 2016.

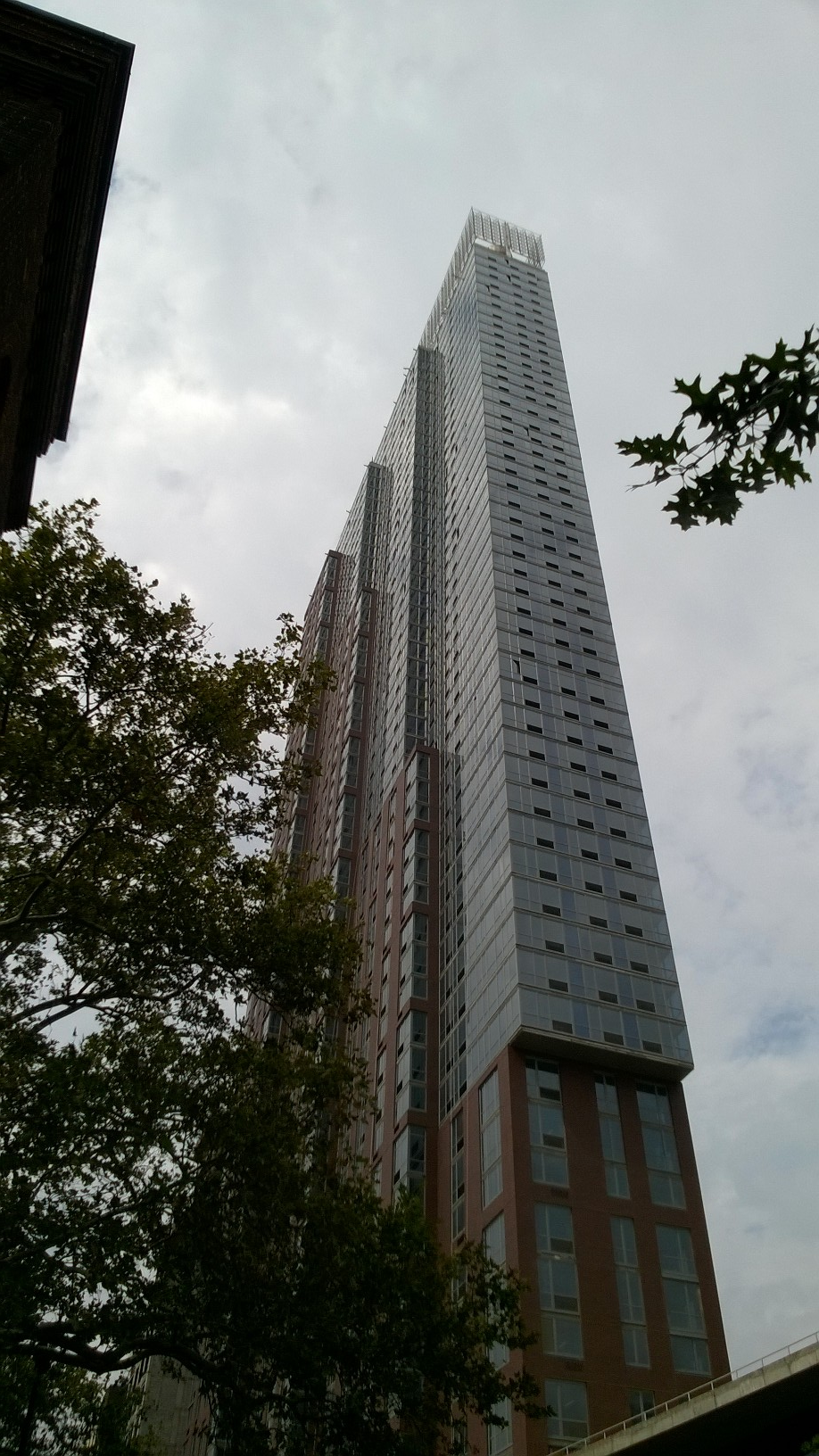
Looking north west from Flatbush Avenue

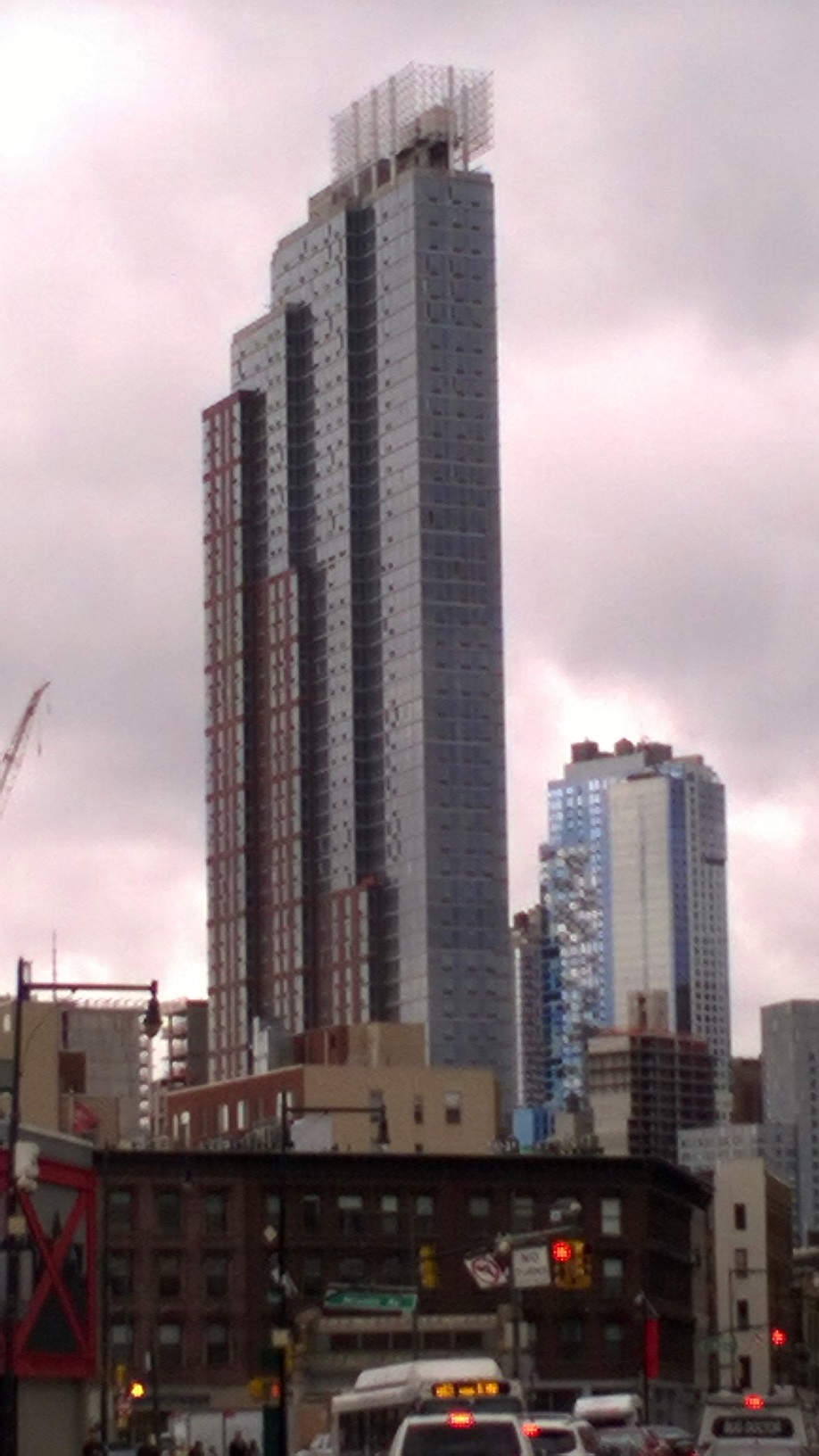
Side alternate view of brick and glass façade looking north with AVA DoBro in the background.

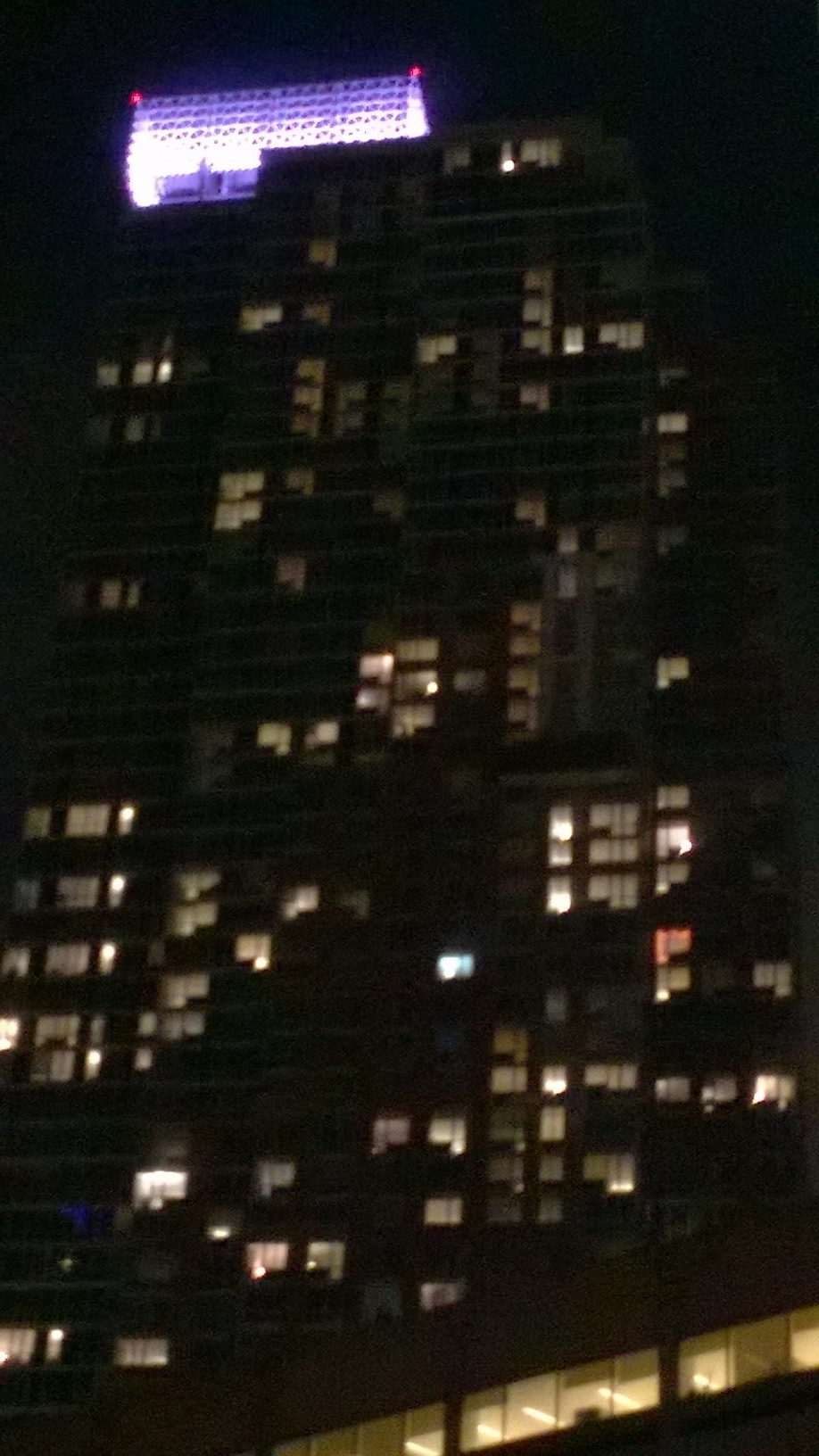
The Hub, with its crown lit in purple, during its regular nightly illumination scheme.

== See also ==
- List of tallest buildings in Brooklyn
- List of tallest buildings in New York City

Records
| Preceded by AVA DoBro | Tallest building in Brooklyn; 2017–2020 | Succeeded by Brooklyn Point |
