= Cammy Abernathy =

American materials scientist

- Education: Massachusetts Institute of Technology
- Scientific career
- Fields: Engineering
- Workplaces: University of Florida, Stanford University

Cammy R. Abernathy is a materials scientist who is the former dean of the University of Florida's Herbert Wertheim College of Engineering.

== Education ==
Abernathy graduated from the Massachusetts Institute of Technology in 1980, followed by MS and PhD degrees from Stanford University in 1985. She received all three of her degrees in materials science and engineering.

== Career ==
Abernathy began as a professor at the University of Florida in 1993. From 2004 to 2009, she worked as an associate dean for the college. In 2009, she was named the Dean of the Herbert Wertheim College of Engineering. In 2015, the college received $50 million from its namesake, Herbert Wertheim. It was the largest cash gift in UF history. She eventually stepped down in December of 2022, being replaced in the interim by Forrest Masters.

She was among three finalists to be the new president of the University of Memphis. Ultimately, Bill Hardgrave was appointed.

Her research includes work in thin-film electronic materials and devices. She is the author of over 500 journal publications, 430 conference papers, one co-authored book, 7 edited books, 8 book chapters, and 7 distinct patents. She currently serves as the William H. Wadsworth director of the Engineering Leadership Institute at UF.

== Recognition ==
Abernathy was recognized as a Fellow of the American Physical Society in 2009 "for contributions to the development of compound semiconductor materials growth using molecular beam epitaxy". She is also a fellow of the American Vacuum Society.

In 2016, the Association for Academic Women at the University of Florida honored Abernathy as its 2016 Woman of Distinction for her leadership and commitment to diversity and inclusion.
