= People's Bank and Trust Company Building =

- U.S. National Register of Historic Places
- New Jersey Register of Historic Places
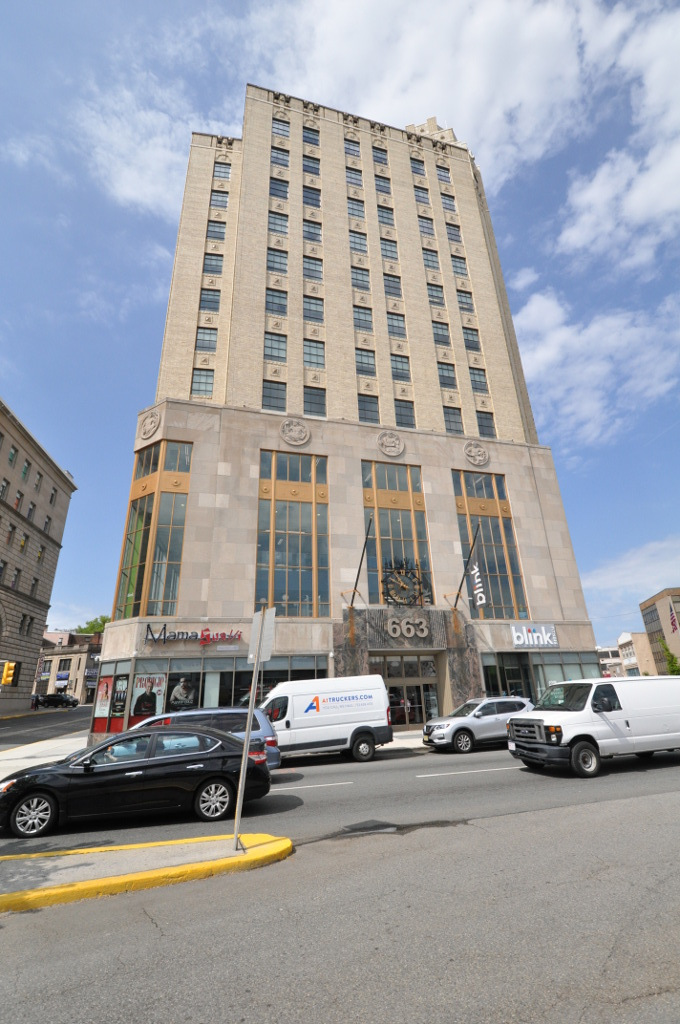

- Location within Passaic County, New Jersey Location within New Jersey Location within the United States
- Location: 663 Main Avenue, Passaic, New Jersey
- Coordinates: 40°51′39.6″N 74°07′34.7″W
- Built: 1931
- Architect: Halsey, McCormack and Helmer
- Architectural style: Art Deco
- NRHP reference No.: 100003110
- NJRHP No.: 5684

Significant dates
- Added to NRHP: November 19, 2018
- Designated NJRHP: August 24, 2018

The People's Bank and Trust Company Building is an Art Deco skyscraper built in 1931 and located at 663 Main Avenue in the city of Passaic in Passaic County, New Jersey. The 154-foot (47 m) tall building is the highest in the city. It was added to the National Register of Historic Places on November 19, 2018, for its significance in architecture. Vacant since 1994, it is now owned by the Passaic Urban Enterprise Zone.

== History and description ==
In 1930, People's Bank and Trust Company acquired three other banking institutions, the Hobart Trust Company, the City Trust Company and the Merchants Bank of Passaic, and needed a new, larger building. The building was designed with Art Deco style by the architectural firm of Halsey, McCormack and Helmer based in New York City. They had previously designed the Williamsburgh Savings Bank Tower. The building was constructed by John W. Ferguson Company of Paterson. The first floor features storefronts, followed by an ashlar limestone section with large windows, and finally a yellow buff brick office tower. Originally 11-stories, a third floor mezzanine was added in 2016.

== See also ==
- National Register of Historic Places listings in Passaic County, New Jersey
