= Williamsburgh Savings Bank Building (175 Broadway) =

Historic bank building in Brooklyn, New York

- Williamsburgh Savings Bank
- U.S. National Register of Historic Places
- New York City Landmark
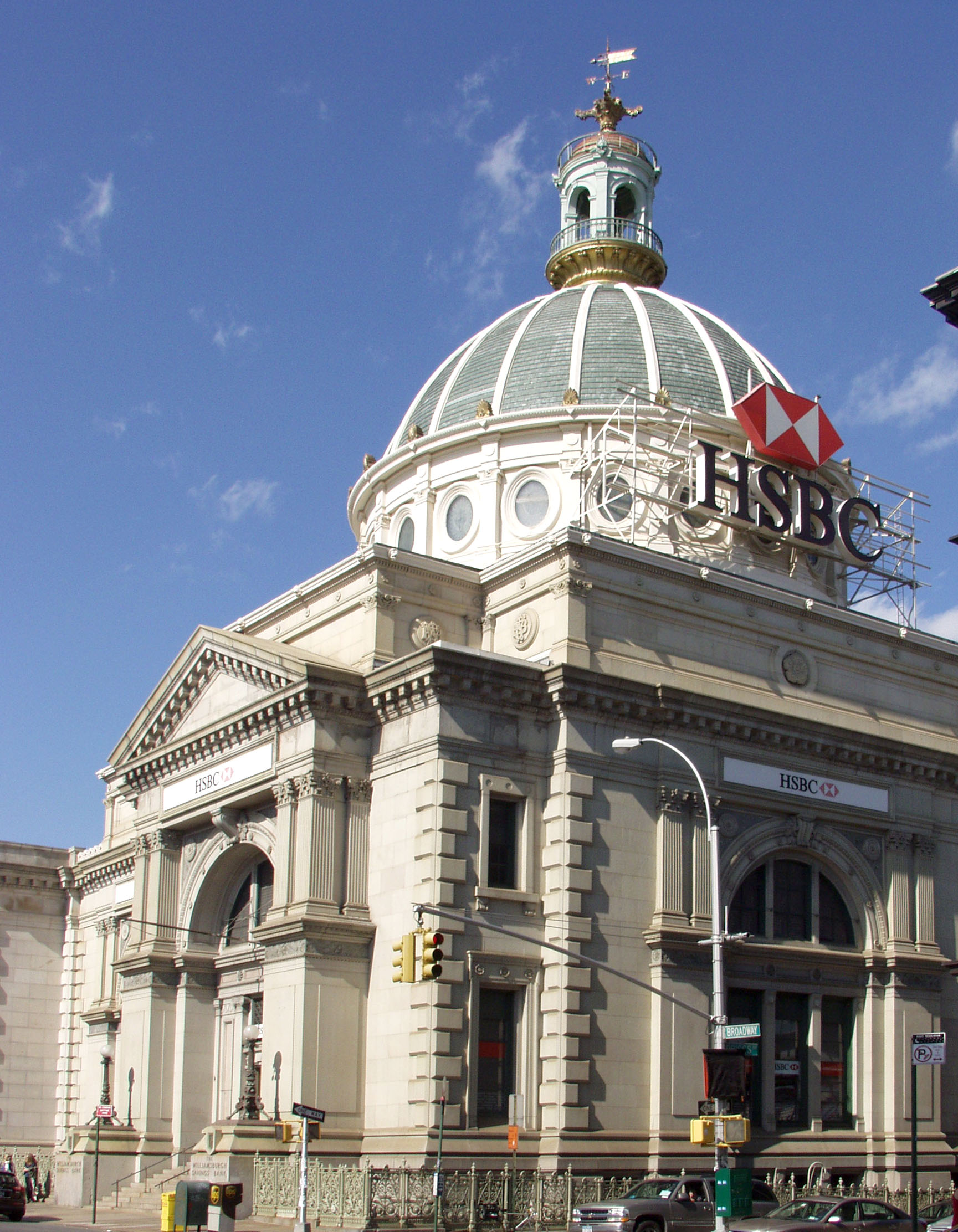
- Location: 175 Broadway, Brooklyn, New York
- Coordinates: 40°42′37″N 73°57′45″W
- Built: 1875
- Architect: George B. Post
- Architectural style: Classical Revival
- NRHP reference No.: 80002642
- NYCL No.: 0164, 1910

Significant dates
- Added to NRHP: April 9, 1980
- Designated NYCL: May 17, 1966 (exterior); June 25, 1996 (interior)

The Williamsburgh Savings Bank Building, also known as the Weylin and 175 Broadway, is a former bank building at 175 Broadway in the Williamsburg neighborhood of Brooklyn in New York City. Constructed as the headquarters of the Williamsburgh Savings Bank in 1875 and subsequently expanded several times, it occupies the northwest corner of Broadway and Driggs Avenue, just south of the Williamsburg Bridge. The Williamsburgh Savings Bank Building was designed in the Classical Revival style by George B. Post, with interiors by Peter B. Wight.

The portion of the bank building to the east, and the annexes to the west, are designed in the same style. The building's facade is made of marble, limestone, and sandstone. The main entrance is through a flight of steps on Broadway, leading up to an archway in the original building. The roof contains a large steel dome above the building's original portion. Inside, a decorative vestibule leads to the original banking room, which has pilasters and archways beneath the painted dome. A second banking room with a smaller dome was to the west, while the bank's internal offices were to the north.

George B. Post was hired to design the 175 Broadway building in 1869 following an architectural design competition, and it opened in June 1875 as the bank's third headquarters. The bank's business expanded through the late 19th century, prompting the bank to hire the firm of Helmle, Huberty & Hudswell to design an addition from 1903 to 1906. Further expansions occurred in 1923–1925 and 1941–1942. Though the bank moved its headquarters to One Hanson Place in Downtown Brooklyn in 1929, the 175 Broadway building remained in use as a branch. The building's facade and original banking room are New York City designated landmarks, and the building was added to the National Register of Historic Places in 1980. The Williamsburgh Savings Bank became part of HSBC Bank USA through several mergers, and HSBC sold the building in 2010. Following a renovation, the banking hall became an event space called the Weylin in 2014.

== Site ==
The Williamsburgh Savings Bank Building is at 175 Broadway, at the northwestern corner with Driggs Avenue, in the Williamsburg neighborhood of Brooklyn in New York City. It occupies a rectangular land lot covering 13,100 sq ft (1,220 m^{2}), with a frontage of 100 ft (30 m) on Driggs Avenue and 130 ft (40 m) on Broadway. The city block is bounded by Broadway to the south, Driggs Avenue to the east, South 5th Street to the north, and Bedford Avenue to the west. The northern half of the city block is occupied by the approach ramp of the Williamsburg Bridge, from which the bank building is visible. Nearby locations include the Peter Luger Steak House across Broadway and Kings County Savings Bank one block west.

Before the 19th century, the city block was part of Frederick Devoe's farm. The site had been divided for development in 1834, and the block contained two churches and several houses by the 1850s. The entire northern section of the block was demolished to make way for the Williamsburg Bridge, which opened in 1903.

== Architecture ==
The bank building is a Classical Revival structure designed by George B. Post and erected in 1875 for the Williamsburgh Savings Bank. The edifice is four stories high with a domed roof. The building blends Roman and Renaissance classical elements, a style that only became popularized two decades after the structure was completed. The current configuration of the building dates to a major expansion in 1906; minor modifications were also made in 1923 and 1941–1942. The firm of Helmle, Huberty & Hudswell designed the 1900s and 1920s additions.

=== Facade ===
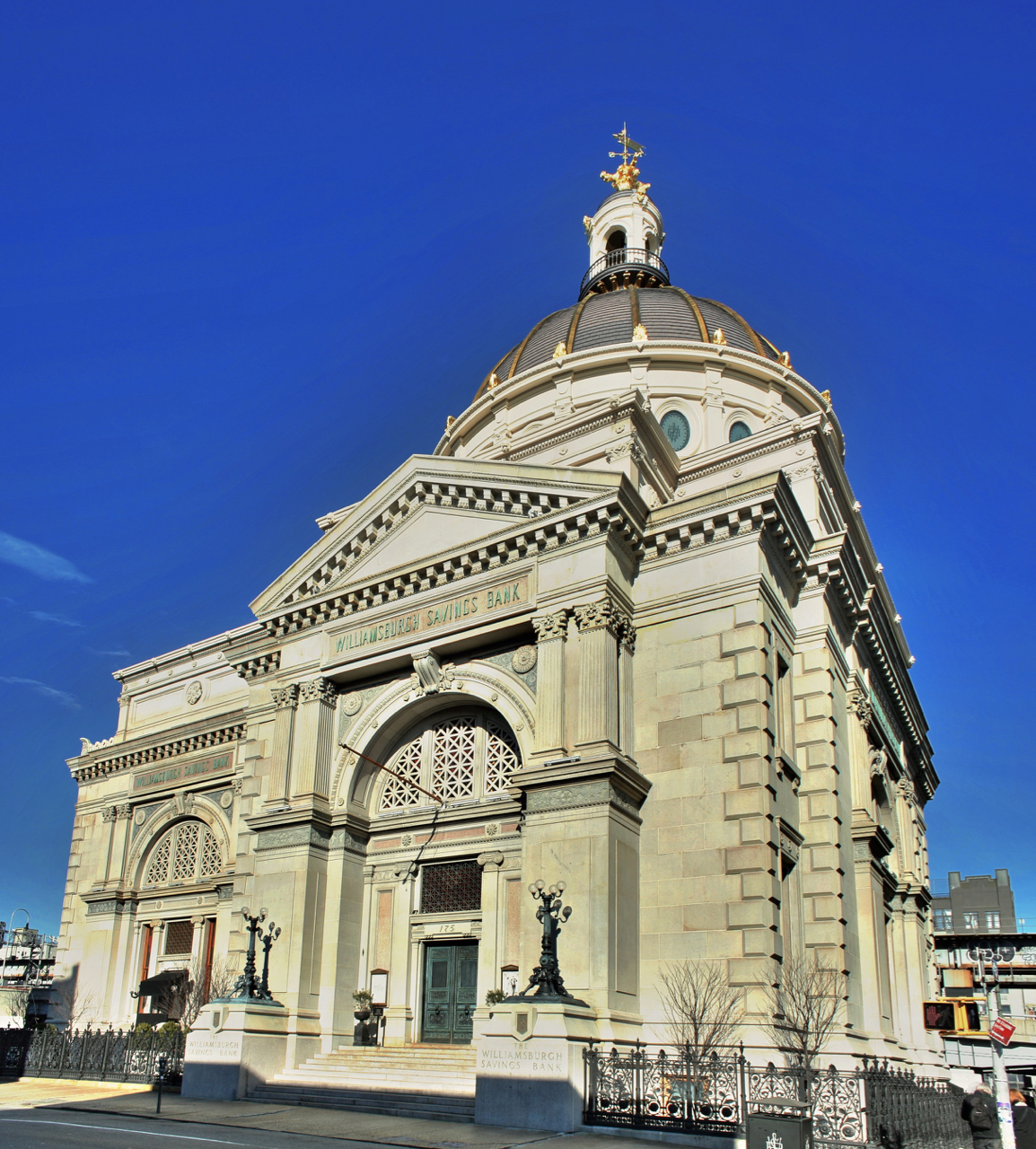
Williamsburgh Savings Bank Building, seen in 2015

The building's facade is made of marble, limestone, and sandstone. Most of the building's facade consists of white Westerly stone. The basement is clad with polished Quincy granite, which was originally colored purple. Various other types of stone are used for smaller architectural details. At ground level, a cast-iron railing runs around the building. Each of the building's corners contains vertical quoins. A sculptural group on the facade illustrates the scriptural Parable of the Talents.

Post's original building measures about 100 by 65 ft (30 by 20 m). The main entrance is on Broadway, where a wide staircase with several steps leads up to the doorway. On either side of the stoop are candelabras. The doorway consists of two bronze doors, recessed within an ornately decorated archway. The arch is composed of double-height piers, above which are pairs of pilasters in the Ionic order. The piers are made of Jonesborough stone, while the pilasters and the arch's spandrels are made of amber-spotted granite. Above the pilasters is an entablature and a triangular pediment. The building also contains an arch along Driggs Avenue; it is also flanked by piers and Ionic pilasters but has no pediment. The facade also had a clock.

The bank's 1906 annex is west of the original building and measures about 60 by 62 ft (18 by 19 m). The annex contains a second arch along Broadway, which is flanked by piers and Ionic pilasters but has no pediment. The exterior of the annex is made of plain and polished granite.

Above the arched openings on both sections is a low attic clad with stone. An ornate cornice runs above the attic. Near the top of the building is a drum with 20 oval windows. The drum supports a large cast-iron dome. The dome is covered in steel plates, which the New-York Tribune described as being "laid in the same manner as slates"; this gave the dome a silvery effect. The top of the dome has a cupola with a weather vane. In a book about the building, the Williamsburgh Savings Bank described the dome as "comparing favorably with those of the capitol dome at Washington, with St. Paul's in London and St. Peter's in Rome". The dome became a symbol of the bank, leading bank officials to request the inclusion of a dome atop its second headquarters at One Hanson Place (built in 1929), over the objections of that building's architects Halsey, McCormack and Helmer.

=== Interior ===
The New York City Department of City Planning cites the building as having around 20,600 ft^{2} (1,910 m^{2}) of interior space, though it had 28,000 ft^{2} (2,600 m^{2}) prior to a 2010s renovation. Post designed the bank's interior as a series of connected spaces. At ground level was an entrance vestibule from Broadway and the original banking room at the center. A second banking hall was added to the west in 1906. During the early 20th century, women used the original room and men used the newer room. North of the original banking room was a rear wing with the bank's offices. A monogram with the bank's initials, "WSB", appears in hardware and other finishes throughout the building.

==== Vestibule ====
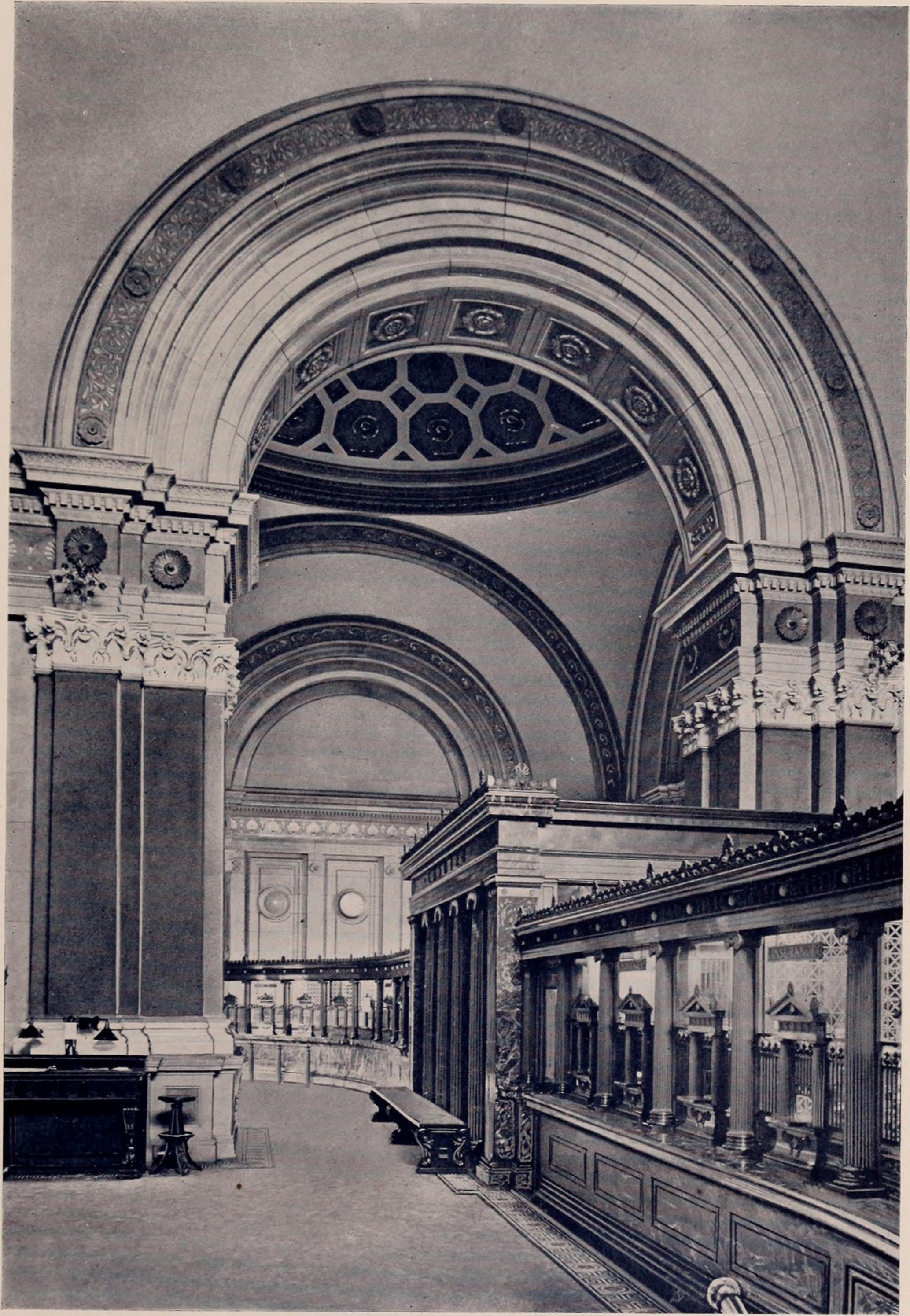
View from the original vestibule

The Broadway entrance vestibule, just inside the main staircase from Broadway, was described in the Brooklyn Daily Times as "one of the most beautiful rooms in the building". It is placed beneath a balcony on the south side of the banking room. The vestibule's floor surface was made of English encaustic tiles. The ceiling had a "deep, warm" design created by Peter B. Wight. The center of the ceiling had a wrought-bronze chandelier with multicolored glass.

A full-height partition separated the vestibule from the banking room at the time of the bank's opening. The partition was made of five full-height plates of French glass, decorated with sand-blown trimmings and separated by wood-and-marble columns. This was subsequently replaced by a half-height partition, which appears in images from 1910. The space had doorways on either side, leading to the corners of the banking room. The Daily Times article described the space as having decorated massive oak doors with bronze finishing and glazed paneling.

==== Original banking room ====
The banking room measures 75 by 75 ft (23 by 23 m). The hall is divided vertically into three sections: a trabeated lower wall, an attic section, and the dome. The banking room originally had ornate Siena marble floors, but those were covered by carpets. The encaustic tiles had Persian designs at their centers, surrounded by similarly styled borders. The middle of the room had a teller's desk shaped like a "U". The desk had a granite counter with marble paneling. By 1906, a plate-glass barrier had been placed atop the counter. In the early 2010s, the banking room's floor was replaced with blocks of marble from Lebanon, as only a quarter of the original Siena marble floor remained; the original marble was used for the bathrooms.

The banking room contains clusters of pilasters at each corner, as well as beneath the springers of the arches on each side. These pilasters are placed on Italian marble pedestals. Each pedestal has stone ornamentation (later painted into a cream color), interspersed with bronze ventilation grilles and gray-green and gold panels of polished granite. At the top of each pedestal, a dado runs a few feet above the ground, wrapping around each wall. The pilasters are topped by Corinthian-style capitals, above which is an entablature with rosettes and moldings. The entablature contains motifs of lotuses and anthemia, which are painted gold, coral, and black. Above the entablature are stone round-arches; those to the east and south contain tripartite windows similar to those seen in Roman baths. The arches are surrounded by archivolts decorated with rinceaux and gill bosses. The corners of the room, between the arches on each wall, have pendentives.

Beyond the arch of the south wall is a recessed vestibule with a balcony above it and piers in front. The eastern section of the south wall has a mahogany double door, surrounded by an ornate stone doorway. It is topped by a granite panel with the word "staircase" inscribed. The balcony has a neo-Grec-style iron railing and connects with small rooms on either side; it is illuminated by a tripartite lunette window. The east and west walls have narrow windows on their southern sections. On the east wall, there is a large tripartite window facing Driggs Avenue, with a lunette above it. A similar window formerly occupied the west wall before 1906, when the second banking room was added. The passageway to the second banking room was flanked by pilasters and had a coffered ceiling; it was sealed in the 1980s. The north wall has single and double wooden doors, surrounded by ornate stone doorways. At the center of the north wall is a metal vault door.

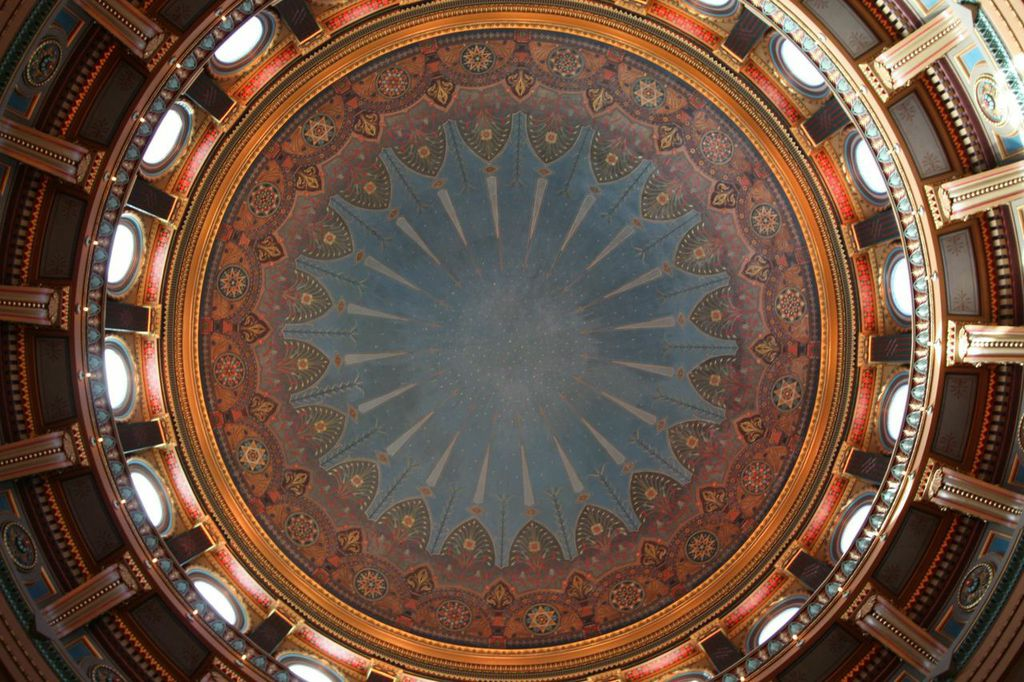
The banking room features an elaborate mural by artist Peter B. Wight.

Beneath the dome, the oval windows of the drum illuminate the banking room. The windows alternate with black pilasters designed in the Neo-Grec style, accented with red and gold decorations. The windows run above a band of ornaments and carved brackets, which are painted red, gold, green, and cream. Above is a bronze and verd antique balustrade, which originally had 40 gas jets. The gas jets were subsequently removed and a pipe rail installed in their place. A cornice runs just below the dome; it is painted black and accented in red and gold. The dome itself is made of a double cast-iron shell and has a mural by P. B. Wight. The center of the mural is painted blue, with golden rays radiating from the top of the dome. The mural has a border with geometric, Neo-Grec, and floral designs. The dome's height is variously cited as being 101 ft (31 m), 110 ft (34 m), or 115 ft (35 m).

==== Other spaces ====
The vault was directly north of the original banking room and is sealed by a lattice-iron vault door with elaborate painting and stenciling. The vault door has an ornate stone frame and is topped by a broken pediment with a barometer, clock, bronze eagle, and tablet. Inscribed on the tablet are the names of the trustees, cashier, building committee, and architect. There was another vault door as well; both were secured with two combination locks. Behind these were latticed iron doors with patent locks, which guarded the trustees' private safes. Behind yet another locked latticed door was the bank's safe, in which the deposits are kept.

The office wing was in the rear. At ground level was the cashier's and president's offices, a bathroom, and a stairway to the upper stories. The stairway was made of iron and bronze, with a cast bronze finish and a carved mahogany rail. The bank's committee and the directors met in rooms on the second floor. Above were a pantry and dining room for officers on the third floor. The offices had plaster doorways with classical moldings, and the president's office contained a fireplace and wood carvings. The directors' room had a gold-and-bronze chandelier, a fireplace with a carved mantel, and a 20 ft-long (6.1 m) table surrounded by 18 leather chairs. Speaking tubes connected the cashier's desk with many of these rooms. Clerks had separate lockers, bathrooms, a dining room, and a kitchen in the basement. A birdcage elevator, installed circa 1911 and one of three remaining in New York City, connects the office wing's stories.

The second banking room is clad with Ohio sandstone and polished granite. It is smaller than the original room, measuring 3,250 sq ft (302 m^{2}). The dome in the second banking room, inspired by Rome's Pantheon, is 68 ft (21 m) tall and contains a skylight measuring 22 ft (6.7 m) across. The second banking room was accessed by an arch in the west wall of the main banking room, measuring 20 ft (6.1 m) wide. The tellers' counter continued through the arch. A tiled floor and two sculptured drinking fountains were also placed in the second banking room.

== History ==
The Williamsburgh Savings Bank was chartered in 1851. The bank was originally housed in the basement of a church at Bedford Avenue and South 3rd Street; it had 158 depositors and $15,000 in assets. In 1854, it relocated to its own building across the street. The bank served the City of Williamsburgh, which lost the "h" when it was annexed by the City of Brooklyn in 1854; (Note: The City of Brooklyn was itself annexed by the City of Greater New York in 1898.) the bank retained the old name. The bank had earned enough to cover the cost of the second building and its underlying land in its first seven years. In the aftermath of the American Civil War, the bank's holdings grew considerably. By 1867, the bank had 16,000 clients who had deposited a combined $5 million.

=== Development ===
In March 1867, the bank's trustees voted to acquire land for a new building. The trustees determined that the intersection of Broadway and Driggs Avenue (the latter of which was then known as Fifth Street) was ideal for a headquarters. At the time, Broadway ran directly to the waterfront of the East River, where a ferry service ran to Manhattan. As a result, many of the houses on the street had been converted to commercial use, particularly after the end of the Civil War. The Williamsburgh Savings Bank spent $110,000 in 1869 to acquire a plot, measuring 112 by 100 ft (34 by 30 m), at Broadway and Driggs Avenue. Property values had risen so dramatically in the preceding years, the Brooklyn Times-Union said the same lot could have been acquired just a few years earlier for $20,000. That March, the bank announced that all the land had been acquired.

The trustees decided to host an architectural design competition for the structure. James H. Giles, Gamaliel King, George B. Post, and Peter B. Wight, were all invited to submit plans, which the trustees then voted on. Post's Classical Revival design received the most votes. Peter B. Wight, the brother-in-law of bank trustee Samuel Mundy Meeker, received the second-most votes for his French Second Empire style design. Wight's plan called for a three-and-a-half story structure with a mansard roof and a central "tower" protruding through the roof. It was Wight who had recommended Post to the trustees; the other two architects, Giles and King, were prolific designers in Brooklyn at the time. At a meeting in July 1869, some trustees expressed concerns about not giving Wight the commission, even though Post had received more votes; however, Post was selected as the architect the following month. Post offered to pay Wight $5,000 to decorate the interior.

Cornell Iron Works was given the contract for the steelwork; the Daily Times wrote that the bank building was an "exhibition of their skill". Other contractors involved in the project included masonry supplier J.G. Batterson and woodwork contractor Captain J. W. Van De Water, as well as the New York Stone Contracting Company. The construction process was delayed by multiple modifications to the design, the financial crisis caused by the Panic of 1873, and delays on the contractors' part. In 1873, the directors acquired portraits of the bank's president and five dead trustees, which were planned to be installed in the directors' room of the new building. Interior work mostly took place from 1873 to 1874. Wight's friend Thomas Stent oversaw the work on behalf of Wight, who lived in Chicago at the time, while Guille, Sarre & Lepelly executed Wight's designs. Karl Muller created an allegorical sculptural group for the bank's exterior. The structure ultimately cost $700,000 to erect.

=== Early years and first expansion ===
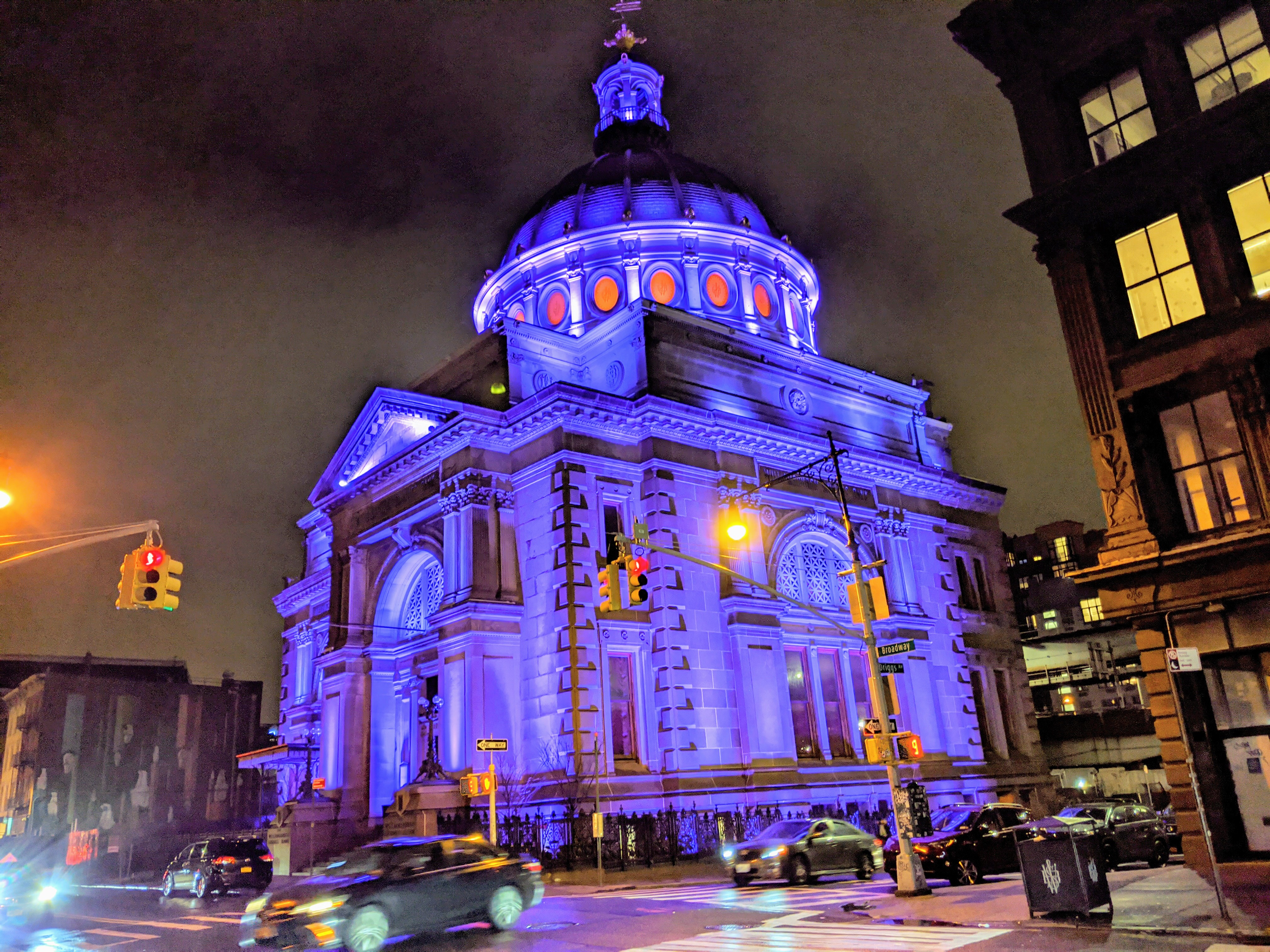
Seen at night

The Williamsburgh Savings Bank opened its new building on June 1, 1875. The year after the building opened, the bank had $14 million in deposits from 25,000 accounts. The bank sold its old building in 1876 to lawyer John M. Stearns, who turned the structure into offices and an auction house. The bank's business grew rapidly after the new building opened, with $19 million in deposits from 38,000 accounts by 1880 and $25 million from 51,000 accounts by 1885. The bank was so successful that, when a large number of account holders gathered outside the building to deposit money in 1893, passersby thought there was a bank run with mass withdrawals. By the end of the 19th century, the Williamsburg Bridge between Manhattan and Brooklyn was being proposed; the bridge's approach ramp was to be just north of the bank building. The bridge, which opened in December 1903, led to a major increase in Williamsburg's business.

By the 1900s, the number of employees had grown so much that some staff had to work in the dimly lit basement. Additionally, modern banks had separate banking rooms for men and women, whereas the Williamsburgh still had one banking room. The bank announced a major expansion in 1902. Early the next year, the bank announced it would build an annex for $300,000 on a plot to the west, measuring 58 ft (18 m) wide. Helmle, Huberty & Hudswell was hired to design the annex. Shortly after excavations for the expansion commenced, a labor strike in May 1903 delayed construction slightly. Later that year, main contractor Cornell Iron Works and the bank's leaders disagreed over the employment of non-unionized workers, though work on the annex continued. By December 1905, the annex had been completed except for interior fittings. Further delays occurred the next year when the marble cutters went on strike.

The annex opened in 1906, and the original banking room was then closed temporarily for renovations costing $300,000. Bank officials also intended to install a new vault in the space occupied by the cashier's office. In December 1906, the original banking room reopened, and bank officials hosted a party for the annex's opening. At that point, the bank had 95,000 depositors. Afterward, men used the new room while women continued to transact under the old dome. The completion of the annex coincided with an increase in the bank's holdings, which had gone from $23 million in 1900 to $51 million in 1908. The bank's expansion continued; by 1922, there were 118,000 depositors with $109 million in the bank. This further expansion prompted the Williamsburgh to build a second annex in 1923. The expansion, completed in 1925 to the north of the first annex, entailed adding a glass structure for the staff.

=== Use as bank branch ===
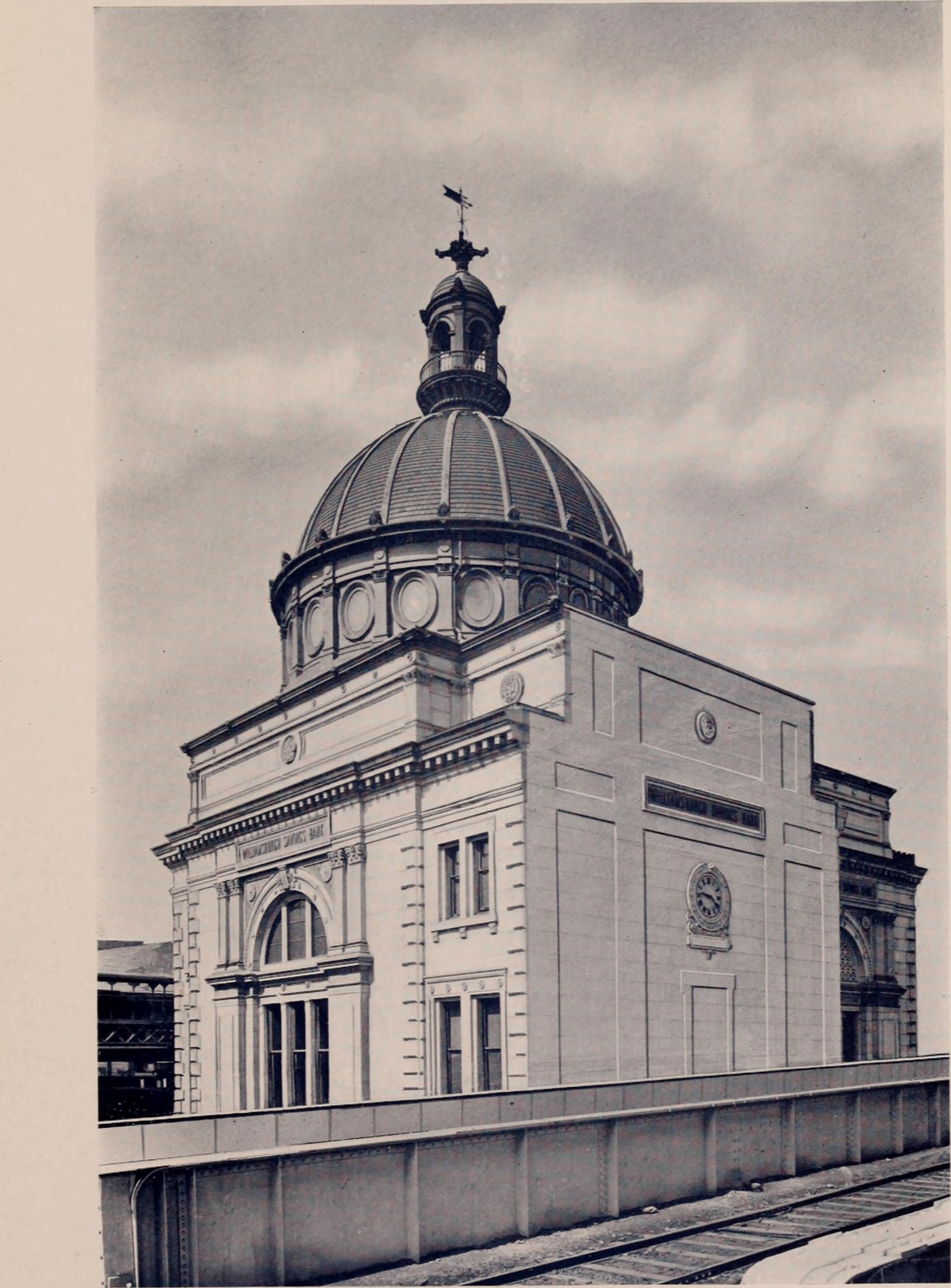
The bank building as seen from the subway tracks of the Williamsburg Bridge in 1910

Each savings bank in New York had been limited to one location until 1923, when the state legislature passed a law allowing savings banks to construct branches. Following this, in mid-1926, the bank decided to build a headquarters at One Hanson Place, near Downtown Brooklyn's transit hub. The 175 Broadway building was to be retained as a branch. A temporary branch at Flatbush and Atlantic Avenues opened in January 1927, and the permanent Hanson Place headquarters opened two years later on April 1, 1929. A life-insurance sales department opened at both of the Williamsburgh Savings Bank's branches in 1941. The Broadway branch was expanded once again to the west from 1941 to 1942. The 1940s annex included a dining room, a kitchen, and more space for tellers. The windows in the dome were covered during World War II.

The Broadway branch hosted events such as an auction of employees' plants for a World War II fundraiser and awards ceremonies for local essay-writing competitions in the 1950s. The New York City Landmarks Preservation Commission (LPC) designated the exterior of the 175 Broadway branch as a city landmark in 1966. The newer banking room, in turn, was leased to Williamsburg Family Services sometime in the late 1970s or the 1980s. The Williamsburgh Savings Bank Building at 175 Broadway was added to the National Register of Historic Places in 1980. The building continued to operate as a bank when Republic National Bank acquired the Williamsburgh Savings Bank and its branches in 1986. Republic, in turn, merged with Manhattan Savings Bank three years later.

The LPC hosted public hearings in June 1993 to determine whether to designate the Williamsburgh Savings Bank Building's interior as a city landmark, along with that of three other banks in Brooklyn and two in Manhattan. (Note: The others were the Dime Savings Bank Building, Williamsburgh Savings Bank Tower, Brooklyn Trust Company Building, Bowery Savings Bank Building (130 Bowery), and Bowery Savings Bank Building (110 East 42nd Street).) In 1995, workers removed the plywood boards that had covered the drum's oval windows for a half-century. Only two of the original windows were intact. The original banking room's interior was designated a New York City landmark on June 25, 1996. Republic and its branches were then acquired by HSBC Bank USA in 1999. Following the acquisition, The New York Times wrote that the HSBC branch was one of "a few grand old buildings [that] still recall Broadway's glamorous past". The Village Voice wrote in 2001: "Even today, banking at HSBC BANK in Williamsburg is like an act of religious devotion [...] you'll be tempted to mutter a prayer as you fumble for your bank card." By the early 21st century, HSBC wished to sell the building, but its design was not suitable for many modern uses, dissuading many potential buyers.

=== Conversion to event venue ===
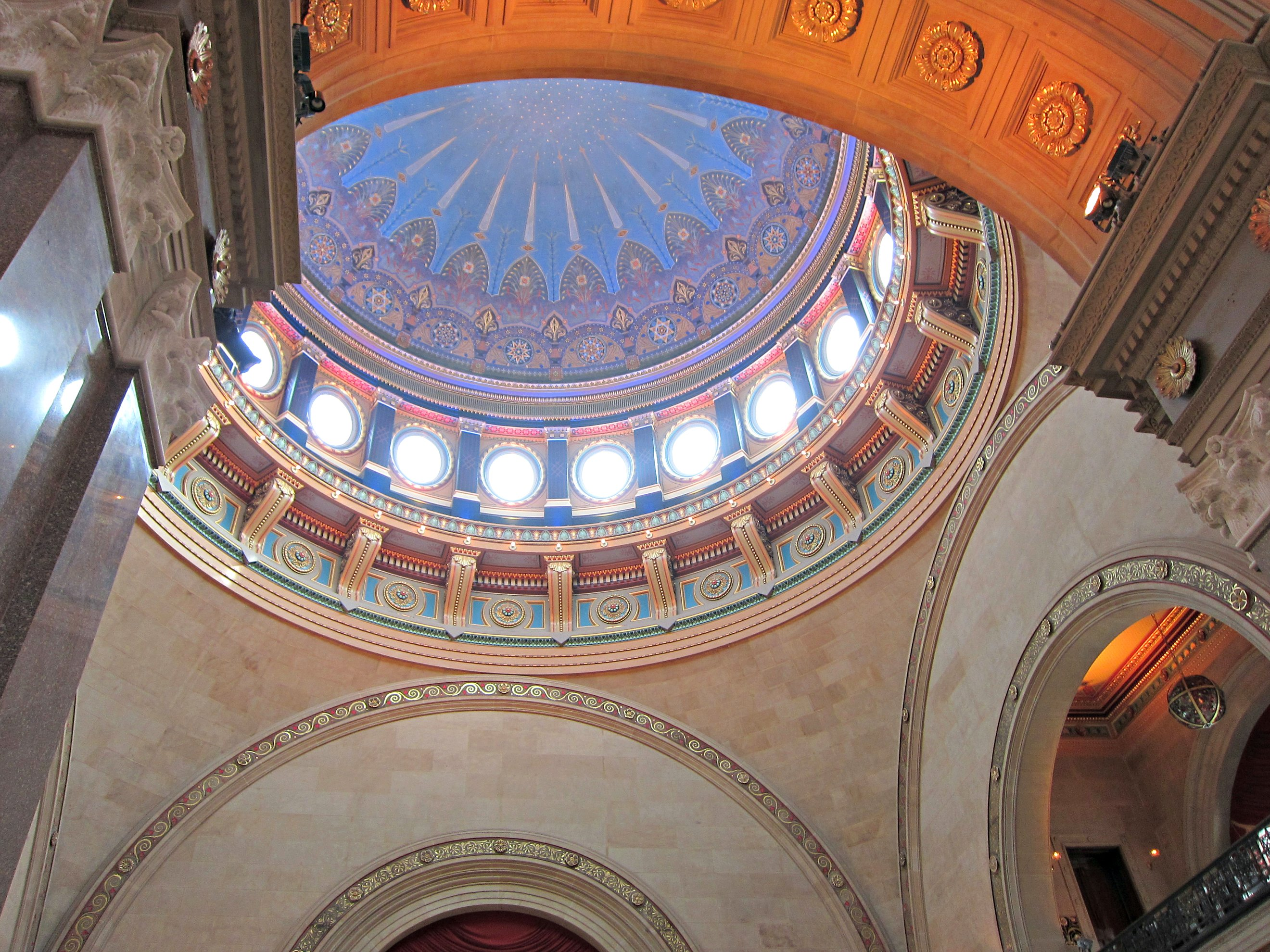
Original banking room

In 2010, Juan Figueroa bought the building and adjacent property from HSBC for $4.5 million. The next year, Figueroa announced that he would convert the building to a banquet hall. Despite opposition from local residents, borough president Eric Adams endorsed a liquor license for the venue. Figueroa also planned a high-rise hotel next to the bank, demolishing the 1941 annex to make way for the hotel. The planned hotel would use both the unused air rights above the bank and a tax credit given to structures listed on the NRHP. Figueroa said his main reason for buying the bank building was actually the development potential of the adjacent site, without which restoring the bank "would be a nerve-racking economic gamble". At the time, only 25 percent of the original marble floors were intact, and P. B. Wight's original mural was so dirty that it looked black. The skylight above the original banking room was damaged after having been placed in storage for three-quarters of a century. The walls no longer matched their original colors, while the woodwork appeared green. The second banking hall had long been sealed.

Figueroa's cousin, Carlos Perez San Martin, moved from Argentina to help renovate the building. From 2011 to 2014, Figueroa and Perez San Martin spent $24 million to restore the property. Some of the cost was covered by NRHP tax credits. The restoration process was complicated by the fact that both the original banking hall and exterior were city landmarks. Figueroa's restoration architect Jorge Bosch said: "This building is alluring, but it's a white elephant." As part of the project, the mural was cleaned, and pieces of the exterior dome and railing were reproduced. New marble floors were installed in the banking room, while the remnants of the original floors were moved to the bathrooms. The cousins also planned to use the basement as an art gallery. Figueroa subsequently sold his stake in the building to Perez San Martin. The banquet hall was named the Weylin after a fictional 19th-century character, Weylin B. Seymour, whose initials allegedly corresponded to the bank building's monogram. The Weylin opened in February 2014. Later that year, the National Trust for Historic Preservation granted the Tony Goldman Preservation Award, recognizing the quality of the building's renovation. The New York Landmarks Conservancy also hosted its 2014 Lucy G. Moses Preservation Awards in the banking room, giving one award to the building itself.

The building hosted events for companies such as Brooklyn Brewery, Google, Gucci, Rag & Bone, TEDx, Uber, and Vogue. It was also used for weddings and appeared as a filming location for several TV shows and films. In addition, events such as the annual Whiskey Extravaganza were booked at the venue. Perez San Martin spent an extra $1 million in the late 2010s to upgrade lighting and audio, as well as other systems related to theatrical and event productions. By 2019, Cornell Realty Management was developing a 26-story hotel and apartment building on the adjacent lot. In March 2020, because of restrictions imposed during the COVID-19 pandemic in New York City, the Weylin was forced to close temporarily. The venue continued to schedule events during its closure, and it reopened in March 2021 after some COVID-19 restrictions were lifted.

== See also ==
- List of New York City Designated Landmarks in Brooklyn
- National Register of Historic Places listings in Brooklyn
