= Williamsburgh Savings Bank =

Bank in Brooklyn, New York (1851–1986)

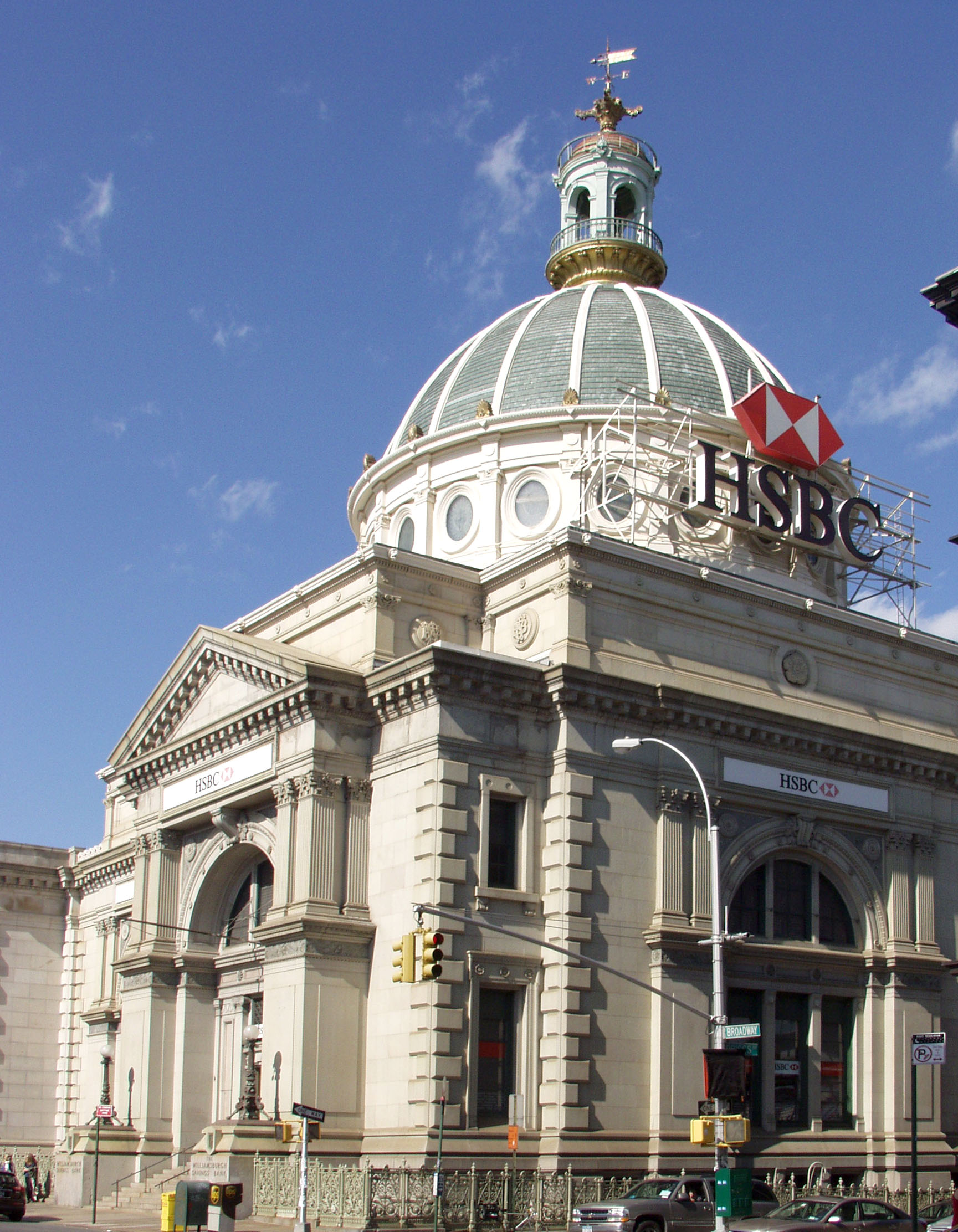
19th century headquarters at 175 Broadway

The Williamsburgh Savings Bank was a financial institution in Brooklyn, New York, from 1851 to 1986. The bank was incorporated in 1851 under legislation passed by the New York State Assembly. The bank continued to operate until a series of mergers brought the bank into the HSBC group late in the 20th century.

== Headquarters buildings ==
The Williamsburgh Savings Bank is remembered today for two imposing headquarters buildings still standing. The domed original at 175 Broadway, designed by George B. Post and opened to the public in 1875, is located at Broadway and Driggs Avenue in Williamsburg, Brooklyn. The building's exterior was protected by the New York City Landmarks Preservation Commission (LPC) in 1966, and it was added to the National Register of Historic Places in 1980. In 2010 Juan Figueroa bought the building and adjacent property for $4.5 million for conversion to a banquet hall named Weylin.

The later Williamsburgh Savings Bank Tower opened in 1929 at One Hanson Place, near the Long Island Rail Road's Atlantic Terminal. The LPC designated the exterior of the building as a New York City landmark in 1977. The interiors of both 175 Broadway and One Hanson Place became city landmarks in 1996.

== History ==
The Williamsburgh Savings Bank was chartered in 1851. The bank was originally housed in the basement of a church at Bedford Avenue and South 3rd Street; it had 158 depositors and $15,000 in assets. In 1854, it relocated to its own building across the street. The bank served the City of Williamsburg, which lost the "h" on Jan. 1, 1852, when the Town of Williamsburgh became the City of Williamsburg; the bank retained the old spelling. The bank had earned enough to cover the cost of the second building and its underlying land in its first seven years. In the aftermath of the American Civil War, the bank's holdings grew considerably. By 1867, the bank had 16,000 clients who had deposited a combined $5 million. To accommodate the growth of the bank, the domed 175 Broadway headquarters was constructed from 1870 to 1875.

Despite expansions in 1906 and 1923, the 175 Broadway headquarters was no longer sufficient for the bank's needs by the 1920s. The bank had 139,000 depositors and $212 million in assets in 1928, making it the fourth-largest in the U.S. Each savings bank in New York had been limited to one location until 1923, when the state legislature passed a law allowing savings banks to construct branches. Following this, in mid-1926, the bank decided to build a headquarters at One Hanson Place, near Downtown Brooklyn's transit hub. The 175 Broadway building was to be retained as a branch. A temporary branch at Flatbush and Atlantic Avenues opened in January 1927, and the permanent Hanson Place headquarters opened two years later on April 1, 1929. A life-insurance sales department opened at both of the Williamsburgh Savings Bank's branches in 1941.

In 1948, the bank filed plans with the New York City Department of Buildings to build another branch at 2301 86th Street in Bay Ridge, Brooklyn. In 1951, the bank filed plans for another branch on New Lots Avenue in New Lots, Brooklyn. The bank opened a branch at Walt Whitman Mall in Suffolk County, Long Island, in 1976.

Republic National Bank acquired the Williamsburgh Savings Bank and its branches in 1986. Republic, in turn, merged with Manhattan Savings Bank three years later. Republic and its branches were then acquired by HSBC Bank USA in 1999.

== Sources ==
- Williamsburgh Savings Bank Tower Interior (PDF) (Report). New York City Landmarks Preservation Commission. June 25, 1996. p. 2. Archived (PDF) from the original on March 22, 2022.
- North, Edgerton Grant (1951). The First Hundred Years, 1851-1951: An Account of the Founding and Growth of the Williamsburgh Savings Bank, Together with a Brief History of the Communities Served by this Bank Through Its First Hundred Years. Williamsburgh Savings Bank.
