= Hanson Place Central United Methodist Church =

Church in Brooklyn, New York

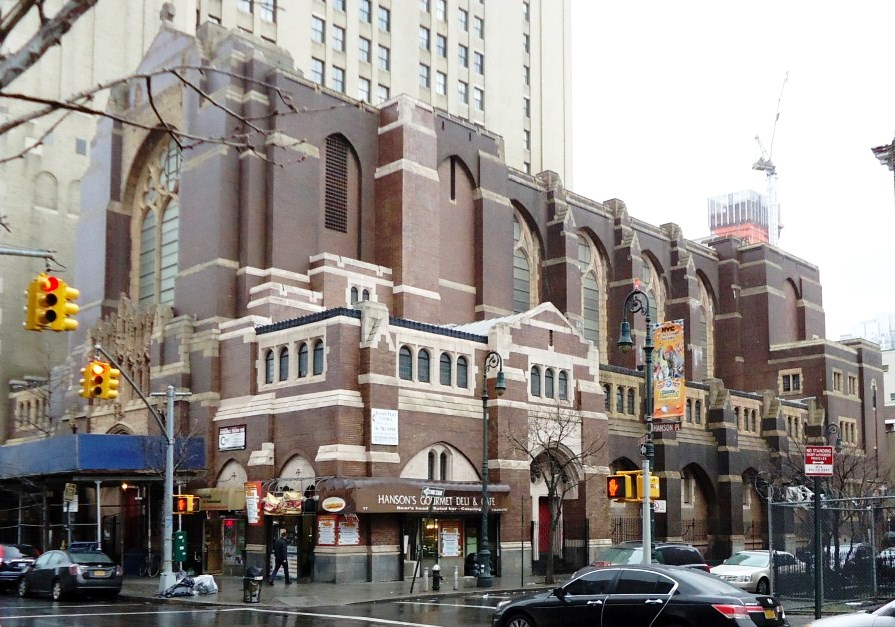
- (2013)
- Interactive map of the Hanson Place Central United; Methodist Church area

General information
- Architectural style: Gothic
- Location: Brooklyn, New York City, United States
- Coordinates: 40°41′8″N 73°58′38″W
- Completed: 1931
- Client: Methodist Episcopal Church of the United States

Technical details
- Structural system: Masonry

The Hanson Place Central United Methodist Church is a Methodist cathedral in the Fort Greene neighborhood of Brooklyn, New York City. It is located on the northwest corner of Hanson Place and St. Felix Street, adjacent to the Williamsburgh Savings Bank Tower. The church is the third Methodist church on the site. The present structure was built in 1929–1931, and its architectural style has been called "Gothic restyled in modern dress, an exercise in massing brick and tan terra cotta that might be called cubistic Art Moderne."

The church's street level features retail stores, and it is also listed as the headquarters for the Boy Scouts in Brooklyn.

As of 2010, Hanson Place Central hosts a midday inspirational service for all members of the downtown Brooklyn community daily at 12 noon. They work to engage all members of their surrounding community. They also have a food pantry open to the public in need.

The church is located within the Brooklyn Academy of Music Historic District, which was created in 1978 by the New York City Landmarks Preservation Commission.

== History ==
The first Methodist church on the site was erected in 1857 on land purchased the year before; prior to that the land had been part of a farm, and then passed through a number of hands after the farm was sub-divided. The Hanson Place Methodist Church, which could accommodate 800 people and had a Sunday school in the basement, was dedicated on January 3, 1858. A new Sunday school building was constructed in 1860, and a parsonage in 1863. By 1872 a larger church was required, which started construction in 1873 and was dedicated on January 4, 1874.

In 1927, the Hanson Place church merged with the Summerfield Methodist Church and the Fleet Street Methodist Church to create the Central Methodist Episcopal Church. The new combined congregation planned on building a new church, and purchased a site for it, but when the 1874 building was condemned by the Department of Buildings as unsafe for occupation due to damage done by subway construction underneath it, the parish decided instead to replace the condemned building and keep the church on the same site.

The Church built again on the same site and the architecturally significant church was completed in 1931. The architecture firm of Halsey, McCormick, and Helmer designed the Modern Gothic/Art Moderne style church, as well as the adjacent landmarked Williamsburgh Savings Bank Tower.

The new, red-brick, Gothic revival structure has a base of granite and is trimmed with stone of a color lighter than the brick. The facade is dominated by the double entry doors within a Gothic arch, and myriad symbolic carvings.

The Hanson Place Central United Methodist Church building was abandoned in 2019 after the congregation's size had declined significantly; in subsequent years, the structure decayed to the point of being uninhabitable. The church building needed tens of millions of dollars in repairs, but merely repurposing the existing building was unlikely to raise the necessary funds. In 2024, Watermark Capital Group agreed to purchase the church building for $15 million, intending to build a luxury apartment tower above the site, while also repairing the existing building. The tower would rise 27 stories with 240 apartments, a quarter of which were to be affordable housing units. The tower proposal was highly contentious, and Brooklyn Community Board 2 recommended that plans for the tower be disapproved. Even so, the developers received a $25 million loan for the development in early 2026, and the New York City Landmarks Preservation Commission indicated it would provisionally support the plans.

In March 2026, the New York City Landmarks Preservation Commission unanimously approved revised plans for the project, including the construction of a residential tower above the historic church. The proposal, submitted by developer Strekte, incorporates the restoration of significant architectural elements while integrating the structure into a larger mixed-use development. During the approval, Landmarks Preservation Commission commissioners described the project as a precedent-setting approach to the adaptive reuse of landmarked religious buildings.
