= Williamsburgh Savings Bank Tower =

Skyscraper in Brooklyn, New York

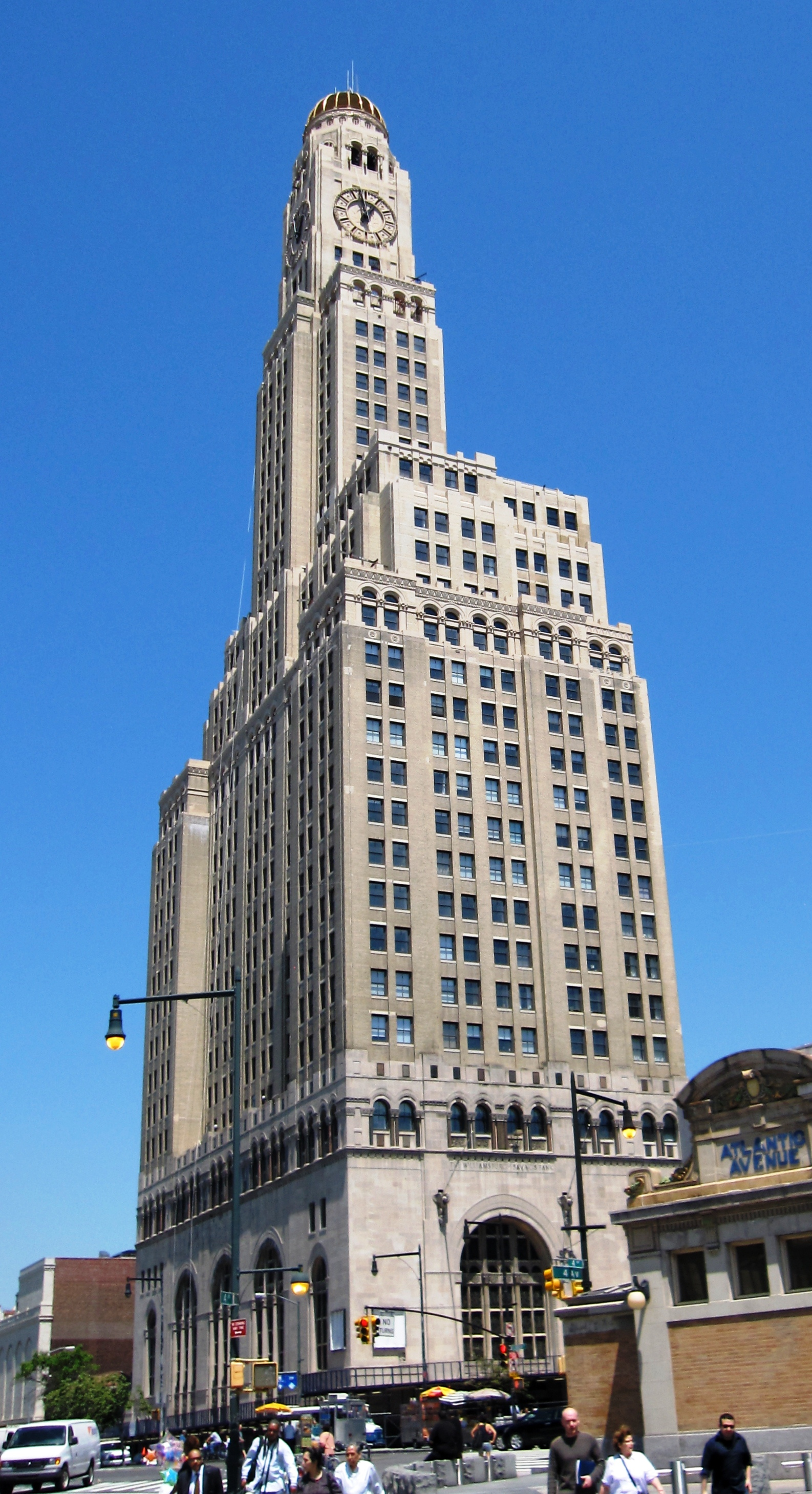
- The tower seen from Fourth Avenue in 2010
- Alternative names: One Hanson Place

General information
- Type: Mixed-use (mostly residential)
- Architectural style: Neo-Romanesque
- Location: 1 Hanson Place, Brooklyn, New York 11217, United States
- Coordinates: 40°41′08″N 73°58′40″W
- Named for: Williamsburgh Savings Bank
- Construction started: 1927
- Completed: May 1929
- Opened: April 1, 1929
- Renovated: 2006–2007

Height
- Roof: 512 feet (156 m)

Technical details
- Structural system: Steel superstructure
- Floor count: 41
- Floor area: 273,186 ft^{2} (25,379.8 m^{2})
- Lifts/elevators: 12
- Grounds: 20,263 sq ft (1,882.5 m^{2})

Design and construction
- Architecture firm: Halsey, McCormack & Helmer
- Developer: Williamsburgh Savings Bank
- Known for: Tallest building in Brooklyn from 1929 to 2009

Renovating team
- Renovating firm: H. Thomas O'Hara

New York City Landmark
- Designated: November 15, 1977
- Reference no.: 0971
- Designated entity: Facade

New York City Landmark
- Designated: June 25, 1996
- Reference no.: 1909
- Designated entity: Lobby and bank interior

The Williamsburgh Savings Bank Tower, also known as One Hanson Place, is a skyscraper in the Fort Greene neighborhood of Brooklyn in New York City, New York, U.S. Located at the northeast corner of Ashland Place and Hanson Place near Downtown Brooklyn, the tower was designed by Halsey, McCormack & Helmer and constructed from 1927 to 1929 as the new headquarters for the Williamsburgh Savings Bank. At 41 stories and 512 feet (156 m) tall, the Williamsburgh Savings Bank Tower was the tallest building in Brooklyn until 2009.

The Williamsburgh Savings Bank was originally headquartered in the Williamsburg neighborhood of Brooklyn; its officers decided to construct a new skyscraper headquarters near Downtown Brooklyn in the mid-1920s. The bank occupied the lowest floors when the building opened on April 1, 1929, while the remaining stories were leased as offices. By the late 20th century, dentists' offices occupied much of the structure. The New York City Landmarks Preservation Commission designated the tower's exterior as a city landmark in 1977 and designated some of the interior spaces in 1996. Through several mergers, the Williamsburgh Savings Bank became part of HSBC Bank USA, which sold the building in 2004. The building's upper stories were converted to luxury condominium apartments from 2005 to 2007, while the banking hall became an event space.

The building's main entrance is through a large arch on Hanson Place. At ground level, the tower is clad with limestone above a granite dado. Above the sixth story, the building is faced in brick with terracotta decoration, and a series of setbacks taper to a clock tower and a domed roof. Inside is an entrance vestibule and lobby with ornately decorated marble and metalwork. The 63-foot-high (19 m) banking room includes a nave, aisles, and a chancel—spaces similar to those found in a church. A basement lobby leads to Atlantic Terminal and the Atlantic Avenue–Barclays Center station, while a mezzanine-level ladies' lounge overlooks the banking room. When the Williamsburgh Savings Bank Tower was completed, there was commentary about both the building's architecture and its symbolism as Brooklyn's tallest building. Over the years, local residents have used the building both as a clock and as a landmark for giving out directions, and the tower has been used as a filming location.

== Site ==
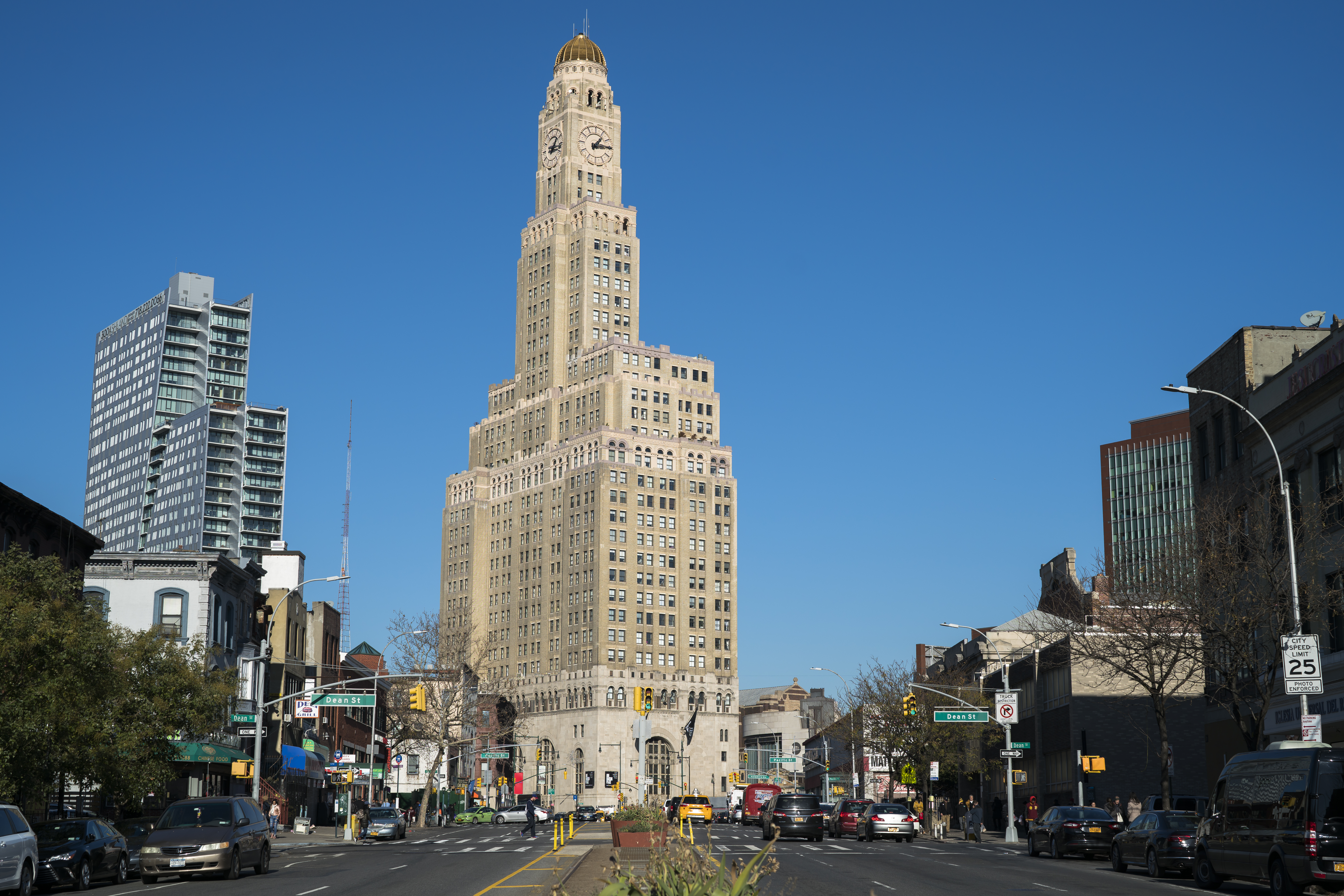
View from Fourth Avenue

The Williamsburgh Savings Bank Tower is at One Hanson Place, in the Fort Greene neighborhood of the borough of Brooklyn in New York City, New York, U.S. It occupies the southwestern section of a rectangular city block bounded by Ashland Place to the west, Hanson Place to the south, St. Felix Street to the east, and Lafayette Avenue to the north. The rectangular land lot covers 20,263 square feet (1,882 m^{2}), with a frontage of 210 feet (64 m) on Ashland Place and 99 feet (30 m) on Hanson Place.

Adjacent to the tower, within the city–designated Brooklyn Academy of Music Historic District, are row houses designed in the Italianate style. The Hanson Place Central United Methodist Church is on the same block to the east, and the Brooklyn Academy of Music is just to the north. An entrance to the New York City Subway's Atlantic Avenue–Barclays Center station is inside the building. The site is also near the Atlantic Terminal mall, the Atlantic Terminal station of the Long Island Rail Road (LIRR), and the Barclays Center arena. The Alloy Block is located to the west, just across Flatbush Avenue.

The site is near the historic split of Jamaica Road (now Atlantic Avenue) and the Flatbush Turnpike (now Flatbush Avenue). It overlooks Times Plaza at the intersection of Flatbush, Atlantic, and Fourth Avenues in Downtown Brooklyn. A commercial center was being envisioned around Times Plaza by the early 20th century. Prior to the tower's construction, there were "about eight" buildings on the lot. A small part of the site was previously owned by the Hanson Place Central United Methodist Church. Although the tower's site is near the subway and LIRR terminal, most business in Brooklyn was centered around Brooklyn Borough Hall, further to the west, before the tower was built.

== History ==
The Williamsburgh Savings Bank was chartered in 1851. The bank was originally housed in the basement of a church in Williamsburg, Brooklyn; the bank's first annual report showed that it had 158 depositors and $15,000 in assets. In 1854, it relocated to its own building across the street. After the American Civil War, the bank's holdings grew considerably, and a new headquarters at 175 Broadway was completed in 1875. The bank had 139,000 depositors and $210 million in assets in 1928, making it the fourth-largest savings bank by deposits in the United States during the late 1920s. Despite being expanded in 1906 and 1923, the 175 Broadway headquarters was no longer sufficient for the bank's needs by the 1920s.

Each savings bank in New York had been limited to one location until 1923, when the state legislature passed a law allowing savings banks to construct branches. In March 1926, the Williamsburgh Savings Bank's Building Committee submitted an application to the New York superintendent of banks to build a branch in Crown Heights, Brooklyn. Three months later, the bank decided to instead build a headquarters near Downtown Brooklyn's transit hub. The 175 Broadway building was to be retained as a branch.

=== Development ===
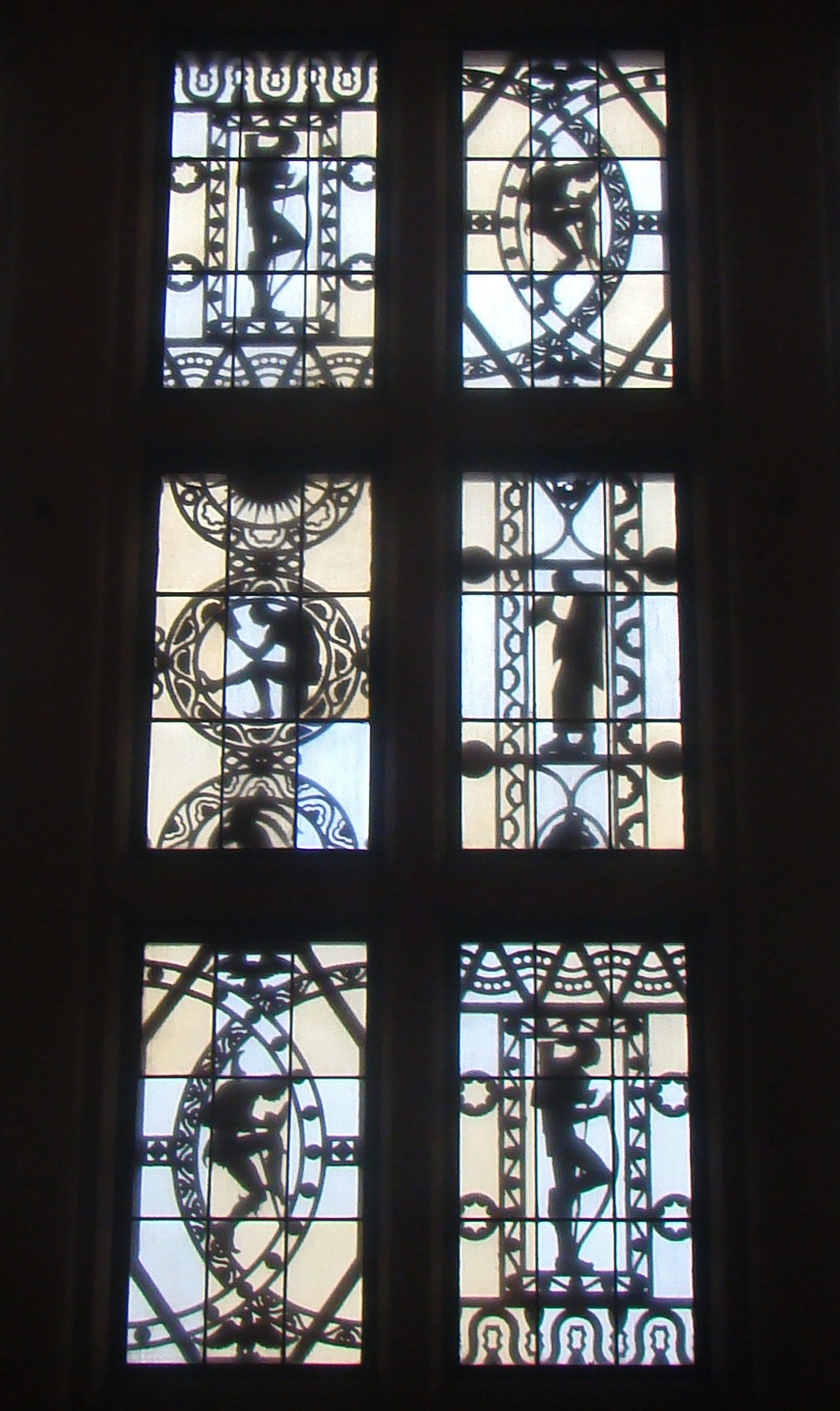
Rene Chambellan's metal window silhouettes

The Williamsburgh Savings Bank anonymously acquired lots on 1–9 Hanson Place and 135–149 Ashland Place in Downtown Brooklyn over a total of 29 transactions in 1926. The Times Union reported on the acquisitions in October 1926, and the bank announced the same month that it would open a new headquarters at the site. The bank planned to open a temporary branch at Flatbush and Atlantic Avenues in the meantime. Upon hearing of the plans, the City Savings Bank and the Dime Savings Bank of New York, which operated branches in Downtown Brooklyn, claimed the Williamsburgh Savings Bank was "invading" their territory; they were joined by eight other banks. Despite the opposition from these ten banks, New York's superintendent of banks gave the Williamsburgh permission to open a Downtown Brooklyn branch. The approval was contingent on the closure of the temporary branch once the permanent building was finished.

Bank officials considered several plans, including one without any rentable space. Ultimately, bank officials decided to construct a 16-story building. The Williamsburgh Savings Bank acquired land from the Hanson Place Church in December 1926, and the building was erected in place of a chimney for the church. In January 1927, the Williamsburgh Savings Bank opened the temporary location at Flatbush and Atlantic Avenues. Later that month, Halsey, McCormack & Helmer filed plans for the new edifice with the city's Bureau of Buildings, and the bank announced that it would begin clearing the site. The bureau rejected the original plans, saying that they violated two provisions of the 1916 Zoning Resolution. The Brooklyn Daily Eagle wrote that the project could be delayed by six to twelve months if the architects were forced to redesign the building.

By August 1927, the William Kennedy Construction Company was excavating the site to lay the foundation. The same firm was awarded the general contract for the new building that December, at which point the building was planned to cost $3 million. In addition, P. J. Keogan was hired as the electrical contractor, Almirall & Co. received the heating contract, and Alexander Bryant Company was retained to install plumbing. The Williamsburgh Savings Bank Tower's cornerstone was laid on April 9, 1928, and the superstructure was topped out by the end of July 1928. Managing agent R. M. Dinsmore began renting out the space that year, and the clock atop the building started operating in December. The tower was completed as other structures nearby were being built, including the Brooklyn Paramount Theater, several office buildings, and apartment buildings on Hanson Place.

=== Bank and office use ===
==== 1920s to 1970s ====
Four hundred people attended a reception for the new bank building on March 28, 1929. At the time, 75 percent of the space had been leased. The banking offices opened on April 1, and the building was 85 percent leased when the office stories officially opened the next month. Four major insurance firms had signed leases in the building by June. Despite the Wall Street Crash later that year, ninety-four percent of the Williamsburgh Savings Bank Tower's space was leased before the end of 1929. The Williamsburgh Savings Bank's business grew in subsequent years. By the bank's 85th anniversary in 1936, there were 165,000 depositors from across the U.S. and in several other countries, although most depositors were from Brooklyn, Queens, and suburban Long Island. Among the building's tenants in the 1930s were the Bureau of Internal Revenue, the United Personal Loan Corporation, and Catholic newspaper The Tablet.

A life insurance sales department opened within the building's bank branch in 1941. J. J. Roehrig of the Williamsburgh Savings Bank took over as the building's manager in 1943. During World War II, the building's management instituted a policy in which only the first four floors would remain illuminated during citywide blackout orders. A rehabilitation center serving discharged service members opened within the building toward the end of the war. In the 1950s, the tower's tenants included architect Henry V. Murphy. As Brooklyn's tallest building, the tower was also used for Good Friday displays, during which some rooms were lit in the pattern of a cross. The clock faces were cleaned extensively in 1957. By the 1960s, the former ladies' lounge next to the banking room was converted into a mailroom. The banking hall also hosted events such as an American Revolutionary War exhibit by the Long Island Historical Society to celebrate the United States Bicentennial in 1976. The observation deck on the 30th story was shuttered in the late 1970s.

The New York City Landmarks Preservation Commission (LPC) designated the exterior of the building as a New York City landmark on November 15, 1977. One of the bank's vice presidents said: "We did not seek this landmark status but we're rather proud of our building." The designation had to be approved by the New York City Board of Estimate, but this approval was delayed after U.S. Congressman Fred Richmond accused the Williamsburgh Savings Bank of participating in redlining by refusing to give mortgages to residents of poorer neighborhoods. The Board of Estimate finally approved the landmark designation in March 1978, when the bank pledged to allocate $10 million for loans and mortgages to Brooklyn residents. The LPC's chairperson, Beverly Moss Spatt, said that if the building were designated as a city landmark, it could also be added to the National Register of Historic Places and receive tax abatements as a result. The LPC designated the Brooklyn Academy of Music Historic District on September 26, 1978; the district includes the Williamsburgh Savings Bank Tower.

==== 1980s to early 2000s ====
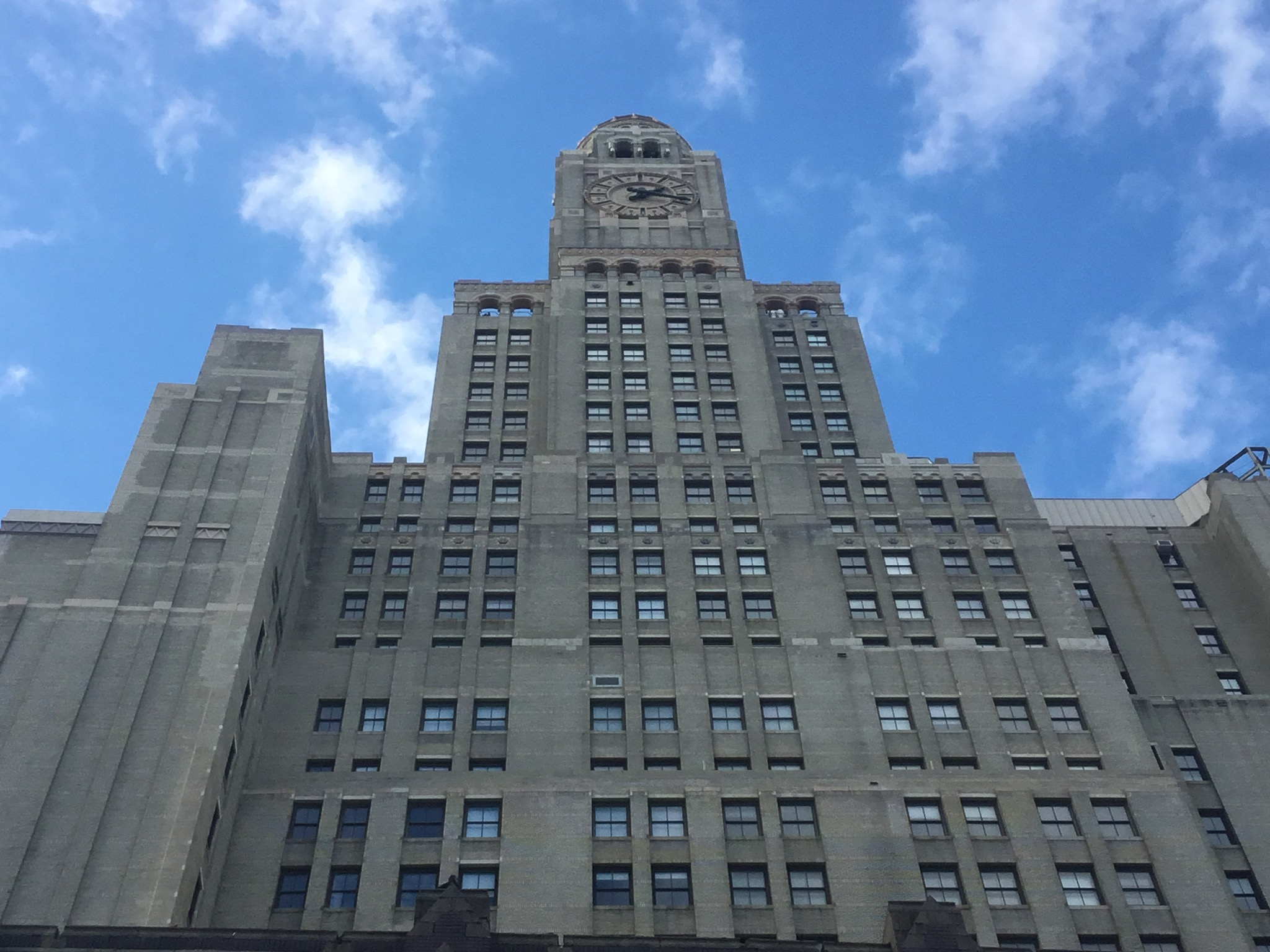
Eastern facade

By the late 20th century, the Williamsburgh Savings Bank Tower contained many dentists' offices. The building also housed the executive offices for the Green-Wood Cemetery, as well as the production offices of The Tablet and one story for data-processing equipment for various companies. The Williamsburgh Savings Bank started replacing windows in 1983 after finding that some were severely deteriorated. The bank did not seek the required approval from the LPC, saying it did not want to delay the window replacement. Republic National Bank acquired Williamsburgh Savings Bank and its branches in 1986. Republic announced plans to renovate the lobby, banking room, mechanical systems, and facade in 1988, in advance of the building's 60th anniversary. The project was completed by that September. During the late 1980s, the building was known as One Hanson Place, and local residents unofficially called it the Williamsburgh Tower.

An LPC staff member contacted the bank after reading news reports of the renovation project. The staff member found that, while most of the work was confined to the interior and did not require approval, 906 of the exterior windows had been replaced. The resulting replacement was the largest violation of New York City's landmarks law at the time. The LPC requested that the bank install muntins over the replacement windows to bring them into compliance with the landmarks law. At the end of 1989, the Republic Savings Bank merged with the Manhattan Savings Bank, but the building's name was not changed. Over 100 dentists took up about seven-tenths of the office space by the early 1990s; the dental office on floor 29 was the highest accessible point in Brooklyn. The New York Times said the building had "one attraction that even the World Trade Center and the Empire State Building can't match: as you inhale the scenery, you can get a root canal too".

The LPC hosted public hearings in June 1993 to determine whether to designate the Williamsburgh Savings Bank Tower's interior as a city landmark, along with the interiors of five other banks citywide. (Note: The others were the Dime Savings Bank Building, Williamsburgh Savings Bank Building (175 Broadway), Brooklyn Trust Company Building, Bowery Savings Bank Building (130 Bowery), and Bowery Savings Bank Building (110 East 42nd Street).) The bank's interior was designated a New York City landmark on June 25, 1996. Republic and its branches were acquired by HSBC Bank USA three years later. HSBC moved into floors 7–11, while the remaining space was 96 percent occupied in 2002. However, the relatively small dimensions of the tower were not attractive to larger tenants, which preferred buildings with higher ceilings and more widely spaced columns. An executive of a local dental society estimated in 2004 that two dozen dentists remained in the tower.

=== Residential conversion ===
==== Sale and renovation ====
HSBC Bank USA had placed the building for sale by mid-2004; the New York Daily News reported that the building could be sold for as much as $95 million. That November, the Dermot Company agreed to buy the building. Retired basketball player Magic Johnson and Canyon Capital Realty Advisers were also partners in the sale, which was finalized in May 2005. The sale price was variously reported as $71 million and $73 million. After the sale, HSBC leased a bank branch at Atlantic Terminal, and the building's remaining dentists had to find new offices. The new owners planned to convert the building to stores and residential condominium apartments while preserving the facade and part of the interior. H. Thomas O'Hara was hired to design the renovation. The Williamsburgh Savings Bank Tower was one of several bank buildings in New York City that were partially or fully converted into residential buildings during the 2000s.

Before the residential conversion could begin, mercury vapors had to be removed from the former dentists' offices. The clock faces, which had become unsynchronized not only with the actual time but with each other, were also temporarily disassembled for repairs. Johnson did not plan to include affordable housing in the converted building, prompting criticism from community groups. Corcoran Group, which was hired to market the building, tried to lease the banking room to a Borders bookstore in 2006. That June, the residential condominiums were placed on sale for between $350,000 and $3.5 million each. The first residents finalized their purchases in 2007, and the clock was re-lit that November following a $1 million renovation.

==== Post-conversion ====
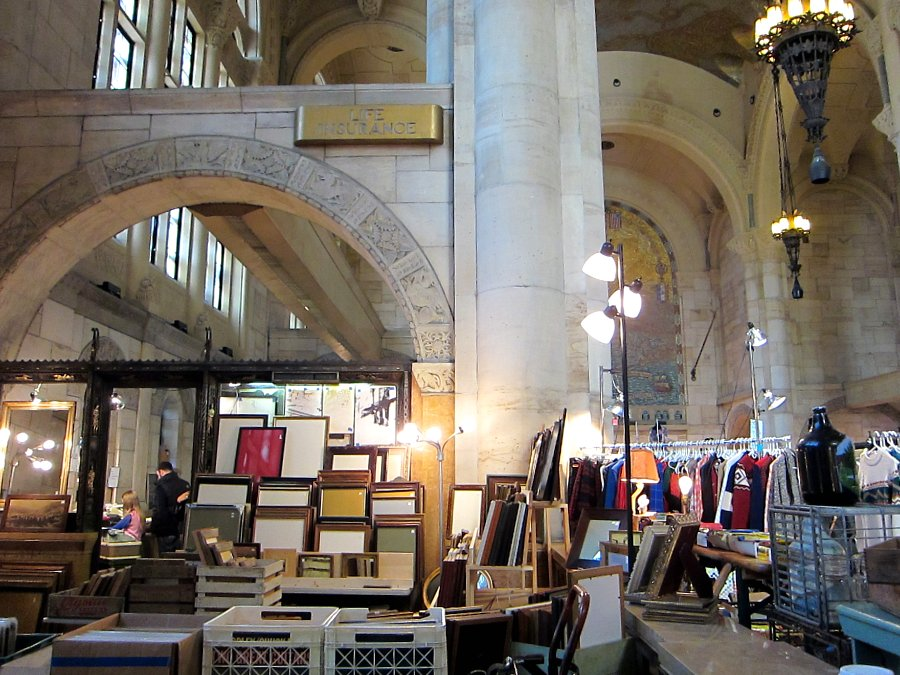
Brooklyn Flea market inside the tower's banking room

Seventy percent of the condominiums had been sold by January 2008, when the first residents moved into the building and the clock's hands started operating again. Residential sales peaked in early 2008 before stalling for about six months. Film producer CJ Follini and Noyack Medical Partners purchased the commercial section of the tower that May. The commercial owners held talks with Apple Inc. and Microsoft to open an Apple Store or a Microsoft Store in the space. They had difficulty securing a tenant for the banking room, which was a city landmark and could not be extensively modified. Furthermore, the commercial owners wanted to wait for a suitable tenant, such as a "museum store" or other cultural institution that would preserve the banking hall.

Events venue Skylight One Hanson agreed to operate the banking room in July 2009. Skylight One Hanson opened that September, renting the banking room for events at rates of at least $15,000 per night. The venue was used by such events as VH1 Divas and MTV's Hip Hop Honors, and the flea market Brooklyn Flea announced that it would use the banking room during weekends starting in January 2010. The space also hosted holiday parties. Though the building's apartments were heavily marketed, some units remained unsold, leading the developers to reduce prices several times. The remaining unsold units, consisting of six penthouses, were auctioned in May 2011 at a significant discount. The clock was repaired again and relit in 2013. In June 2015, Madison Realty Capital bought the Williamsburgh Savings Bank Tower's 41,400-square-foot (3,850 m^{2}) retail space, including the banking room, for $20.4 million. Madison Realty intended to convert the space into a flagship store.

In 2017, the LPC approved a proposal by Higgins Quasebarth & Partners and Acheson Doyle Partners Architects to modify the banking room. The changes consisted of circulation improvements such as the removal of some tellers' windows. At the end of that year, Madison Realty hired Chris DeCrosta to market the space. Further alterations to the banking room's furniture were approved in 2019. The mortgage on the building's retail space was at risk of foreclosure by 2023, and a state judge ruled in January 2024 that the retail space could be sold to pay off the $23.8 million that Madison Realty owed on the retail space's mortgage. Amherst Capital acquired the retail space in October 2024 for $1.9 million, and it resold the space the next month to BSE Global, a firm operated by Joe Tsai, for $10.3 million. In May 2026, the hospitality group Casa Tua announced that it would open a food hall in the banking room the next year, in partnership with BSE. Simultaneously, the building's condominium board announced plans to add a cogeneration plant to the basement.

== Architecture ==
Williamsburg Savings Bank Tower at sundown, fall 2026

The tower was designed by the architectural firm Halsey, McCormack & Helmer. The building was constructed with elements of the Byzantine and Romanesque styles. Robert Helmer, the building's lead architect, had intended for the tower "to be regarded as a cathedral dedicated to the furtherance of thrift and prosperity".

Sources disagree on the number of stories. According to the New York City Department of City Planning, the Williamsburgh Savings Bank Tower has 41 stories, while Emporis and the Council on Tall Buildings and Urban Habitat give a figure of 42 stories. (Note: The building has been described as having as few as 34 stories.) The building measures 512 feet (156 m) tall to its pinnacle. This made it the tallest building in Brooklyn when it was finished, as well as the tallest building geographically on Long Island; a 597-foot-tall (182 m) transmitter built atop the nearby Brooklyn Technical High School surpassed the building as Brooklyn's tallest structure in 1938. The tower remained New York City's tallest building outside Manhattan until 1989, when One Court Square in Queens was completed, and Brooklyn's tallest building until 2009, when the Brooklyner topped out.

=== Form and facade ===
The building has 935 windows. The ground level of the Williamsburgh Savings Bank Tower occupies the full site. Its massing includes setbacks on the upper stories, clad in brick and architectural terracotta. These setbacks are included to comply with the 1916 Zoning Resolution. For most of the 20th century, the Williamsburgh Savings Bank Tower was the only high-rise in the surrounding area. This, along with the fact that the building was near the intersection of five streets, (Note: Namely Ashland and Hanson Places and Flatbush, Fourth, and Atlantic Avenues.) often resulted in the intensification of wind gusts around the building. Throughout the exterior are carved depictions of objects such as flowers, animals, and a thief.

==== Base ====
Decorative details of the base

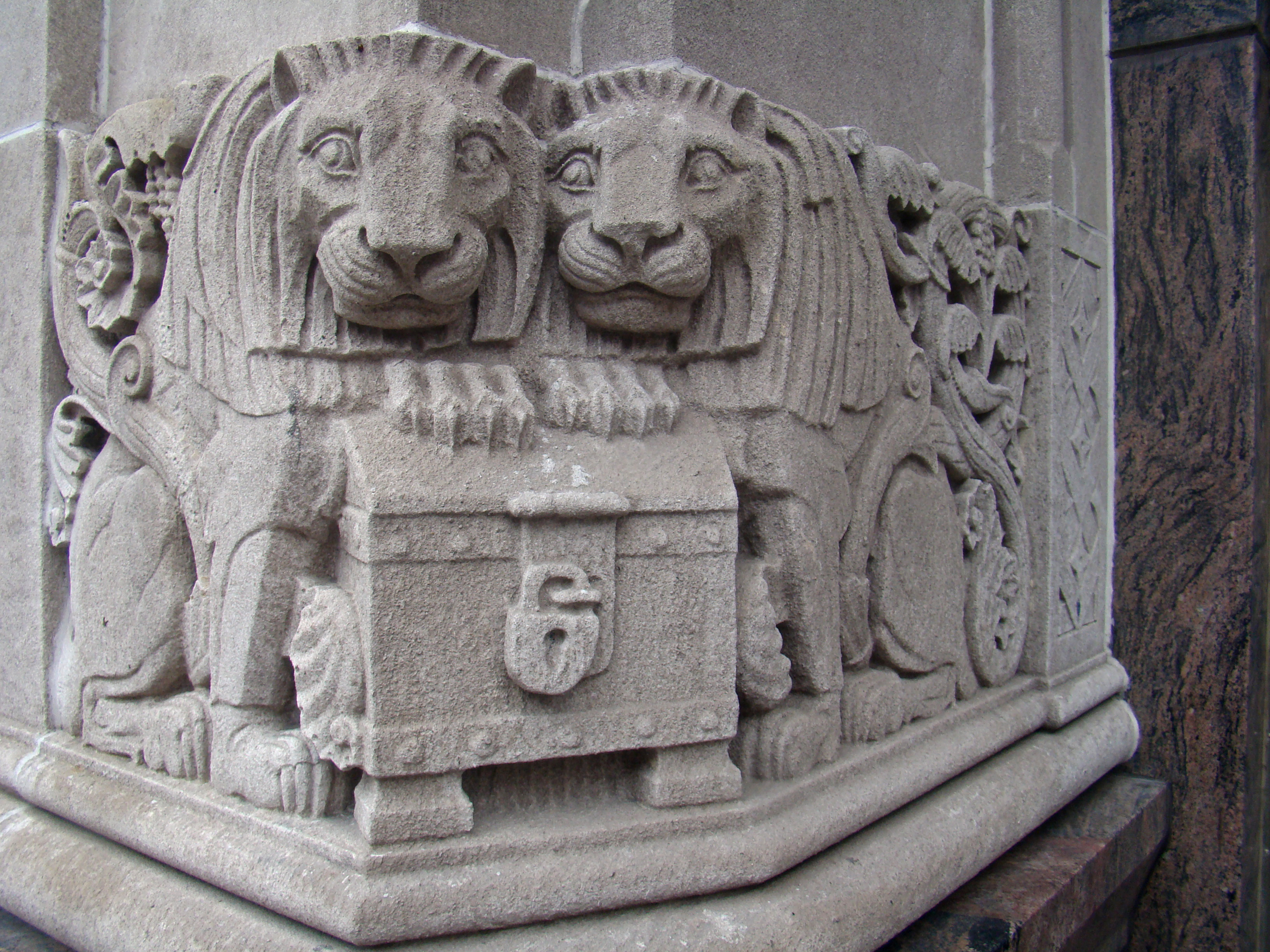
Lions guard the door

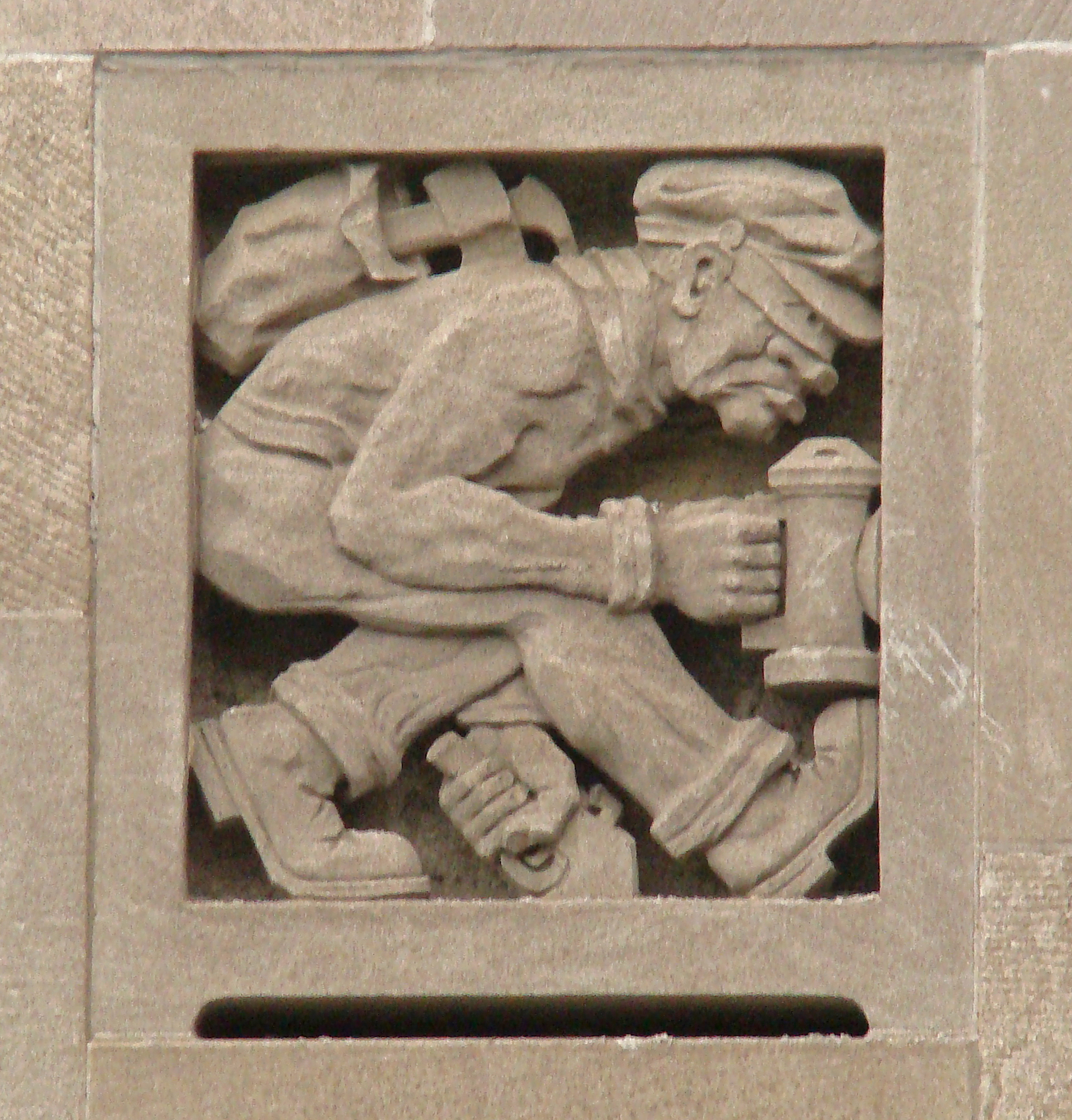
Burglar inset on facade

On the lower stories, each elevation of the tower's facade is arranged symmetrically around the axes of the ground-story banking room. At the ground level is a highly polished dado veneered with veined and colored Minnesota granite and topped with walls of random laid Indiana limestone. The cornerstone has a dedication inscribed into it. The first six stories of the Williamsburgh Savings Bank Tower are clad with limestone. The center of the Ashland Place elevation contains three arched windows, which measure about 40 feet (12 m) tall and are flanked by smaller arched windows. The center of the Hanson Place elevation has a similarly large arched opening with three round-arched doorways. The Hanson Place arch measures 24 feet (7.3 m) wide by 48.75 feet (14.86 m) tall. To the right of the Hanson Place arch is the entrance to the Atlantic Avenue–Barclays Center subway station, with a bronze sign reading "Subway".

The frames of the large windows are ornately decorated, with half-round mullions. The windows contain tinted cast-glass panes made by the Thomas Jones Decorative Glass Company. Other carved details represent values of thrift. These include beehives; squirrels that store nuts; the head of Mercury, god of commerce; wise owls; and seated lions whose paws protect the bank's lockbox, with the bank's monogram on the lock shaft. Four continents are also represented in the windows' carved grilles. Above the large arches, on floor 2, (Note: The physical count of stories differs from the floor numbers because the banking hall is physically five stories high. Landmarks Preservation Commission 1977, p. 2 counts the physical sixth story as floor 2; a similar discrepancy exists on higher floors.) is a Romanesque-style arcade of smaller round-arched windows separated by polished-granite columns. Floor 2 is topped by a band of corbels, delineating the transition to the upper stories. Buff brick and terracotta details are used to visually separate the base from the setback upper section.

==== Upper stories ====
Above floor 2, each elevation of the building's facade is articulated by vertical piers that rise ten stories. Floors 3 through 12 are divided into ten bays along Ashland Place and five bays along Hanson Place. Each bay contains two windows per story; the center six bays on Ashland Place are recessed. The 13th floor contains round-arched windows, above which is a horizontal band of terracotta and a setback. Above this story, the massing of the Williamsburgh Savings Bank Tower rises in an asymmetrical cruciform shape. Contrasting limestone trim is used to distinguish each setback.

At the 26th floor are arched windows, topped by another horizontal band of terracotta, as well as a setback with the abandoned observation deck. This setback is approximately 320 feet (98 m) high. In the mid-20th century, visitors could access the deck by obtaining a card from the building's security guards, which had to be returned when the visitor departed. As late as the 1970s, the observation deck was open to the public during the middle of the day on weekdays, and visitors did not need to pay admission. The observation deck was closed by the late 1970s. Bank officials in 1989 could not recall anyone having ever jumped to their death from the observatory.

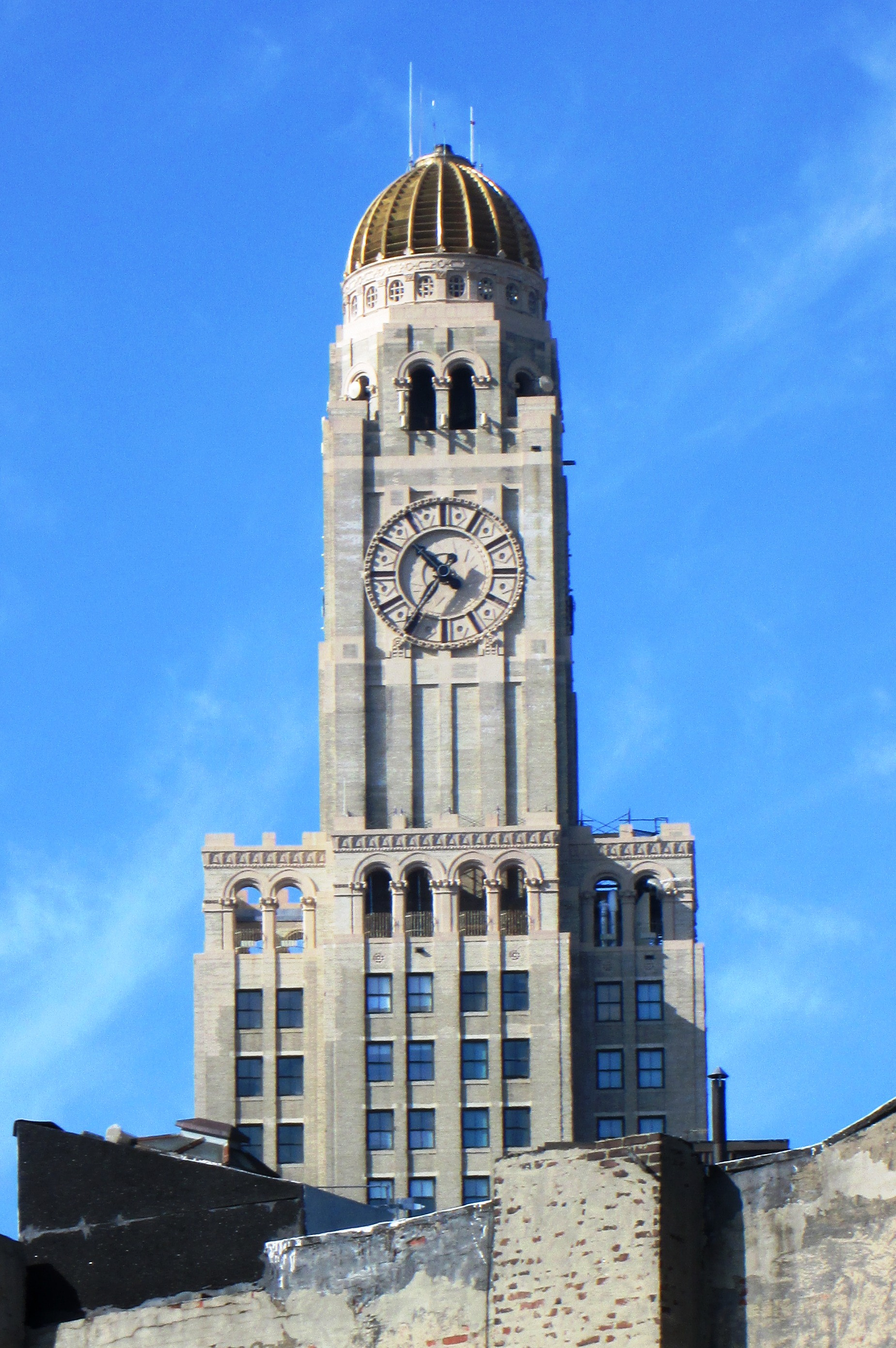
Clock and dome atop the building

The topmost section of the Williamsburgh Savings Bank Tower is square with large clock faces on each side. Corresponding to floors 30 through 32, the clock faces originally contained bright red neon tubes. The centers of the clock faces are 430 feet (130 m) high, and the faces measure 27 feet (8.2 m) across. This made the clock, at one point, the largest in New York City and among the largest in the world. (Note: The center of each clock face is 430 feet (130 m) above the street. Each hour hand measures 9 feet (2.7 m) long. Each minute hand is variously cited as 12.5 feet (3.8 m) or 15.75 feet (4.80 m) long. The hour hands each weigh 294 pounds (133 kg), and the minute hands weigh 523 pounds (237 kg).) There are dots in place of numerals, as well as twelve light bulbs behind each clock face. When the clock was first illuminated in 1928, the Brooklyn Daily Eagle claimed the faces could be seen from 30 miles (48 km) away. During the mid-20th century, many of the borough's residents relied on the clock; one of the clock's maintainers said in 1973 that "if it's a minute off, the people telephone immediately".

The building is topped by an octagonal drum, which supports the dome above it. The Williamsburgh Savings Bank Tower's Renaissance-style dome was inspired by that atop the bank's 175 Broadway building, which had been designed by George B. Post. Bank officials required that the dome be included on the tower; as one of the architects noted: "Dome was required by Bank over our dead protests". The dome was illuminated at night by multicolored lights. At the time of the building's opening, these lights illuminated in a pattern that repeated every four minutes. To accommodate the lighting system, the dome was clad with movable louvers.

=== Interior ===
The Williamsburgh Savings Bank Tower has a gross floor area of 273,186 square feet (25,379.8 m^{2}) and is divided into 197 ownership units, 179 of which are residential apartments. There is also a retail space spanning 33,000 square feet (3,100 m^{2}) across three levels. (Note: The basement and ground floor each have 15,000 square feet (1,400 m^{2}), while the mezzanine has 3,000 square feet (280 m^{2}).) A 63-foot-tall (19 m) banking room occupies much of the building's lower section. To the south is the building's lobby and the Hanson Place entrance vestibule. The main lobby, extending the width of the Hanson Place frontage, has segmental arches that separate it into eleven bays. Above the lobby, a mezzanine with a ladies' lounge overlooks the banking room.

The building has a steel superstructure, though this is concealed on the lower stories by cast stonework. The superstructure is arranged around the columns in the banking room; the use of a portal frame enabled the construction of the office stories above. Rene Paul Chambellan created many sculptures for the bank's interior. Masonry and metalwork are used extensively inside the bank, including brass, bronze, copper, silver, and both cast and wrought steel. Also present are 22 types of marble, ranging from red to green to purple. Wood was used only for flagpoles in the banking room. Glass mosaic and plaster were used to construct the ceiling. Within the banking room and its ladies' lounge, mosaics and huge tinted windows contain silhouetted iron cutouts with vignettes of figures such as workers and students. Cox, Nostrand & Gunnison manufactured the banking interiors' lighting fixtures.

==== Lobby ====
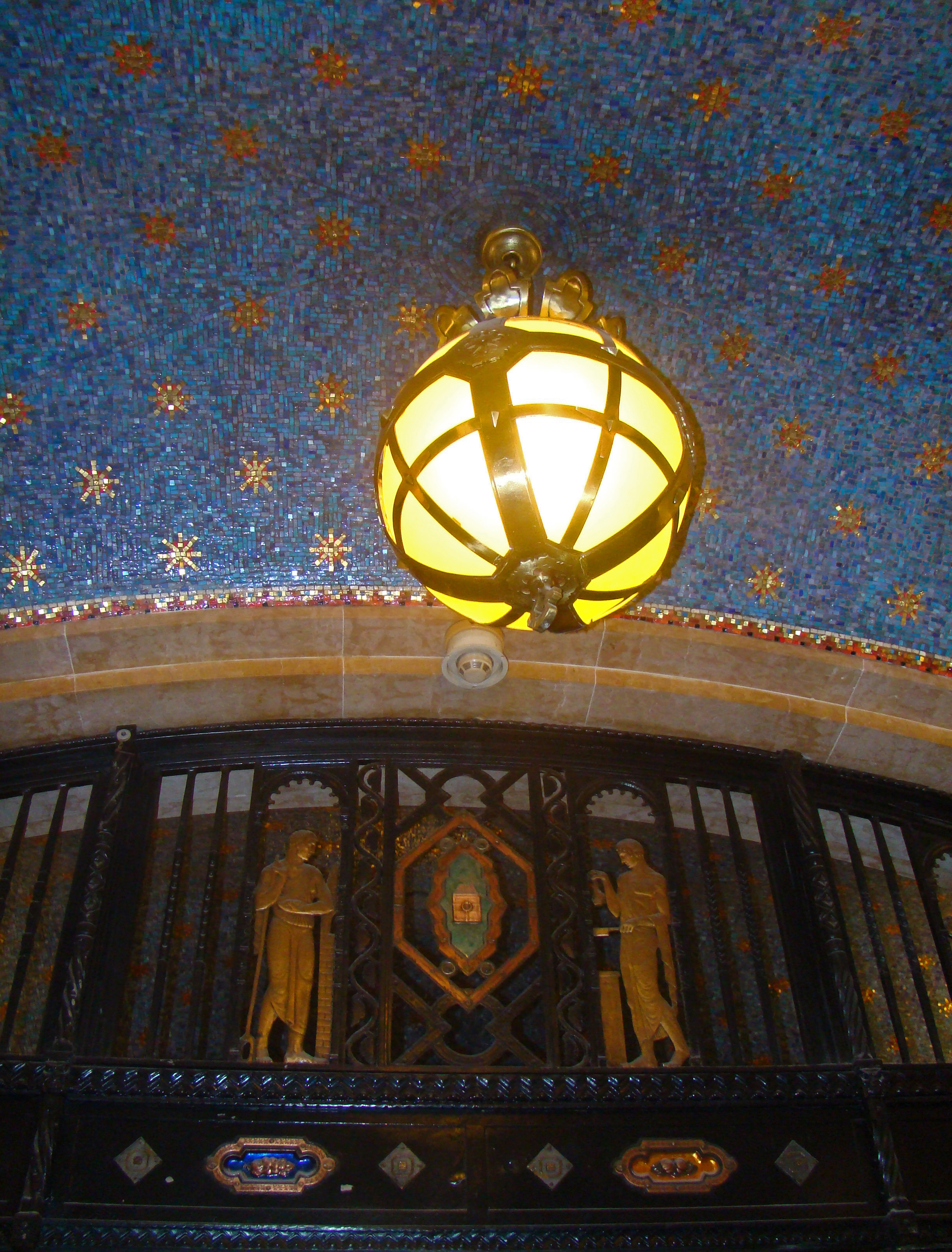
Metalwork in the central section of the lobby

The entrance vestibule connects the Hanson Place entrance to the south with the lobby to the north. At the center of the Hanson Place elevation is an entrance vestibule that connects with the lobby. Three sets of doors, topped by metal panels with motifs of small arcades, lead from the vestibule to the main lobby. The vestibule's west and east walls contain metal grilles with floral decorations.

The lobby runs east–west across the southern side of the building, parallel to Hanson Street. The lobby's marble floor contains motifs, which are decorated in the style of the ancient Italian Cosmati family; they are surrounded by marble borders of different colors. Three double metal doors lead to the banking room. Carved figures on these doors represent six types of workers who might open accounts at the bank, while floral decorations represent all twelve months of the year. The lobby walls are made of marble. Segmental arches divide the lobby's ceiling into 11 saucer vaults, which are covered with blue-hued mosaic tiles that represent the sky. Gold stars are overlaid onto the ceiling, and globe-shaped lighting fixtures hang from some of the vaults.

The western end of the lobby contains a stair to the safe-deposit area in the basement. To the east are the elevators, a staircase to the basement lobby, and a staircase to the former ladies' lounge. There are five sets of elevator doors. The original elevator doors were decorated with representations of seasons, types of arts, classical elements, and skilled workers. The decorative elevator doors have since been replaced with unornamented aluminum doors. The stairways up to the ladies' lounge and down to the basement lobby have marble walls.

==== Banking room ====
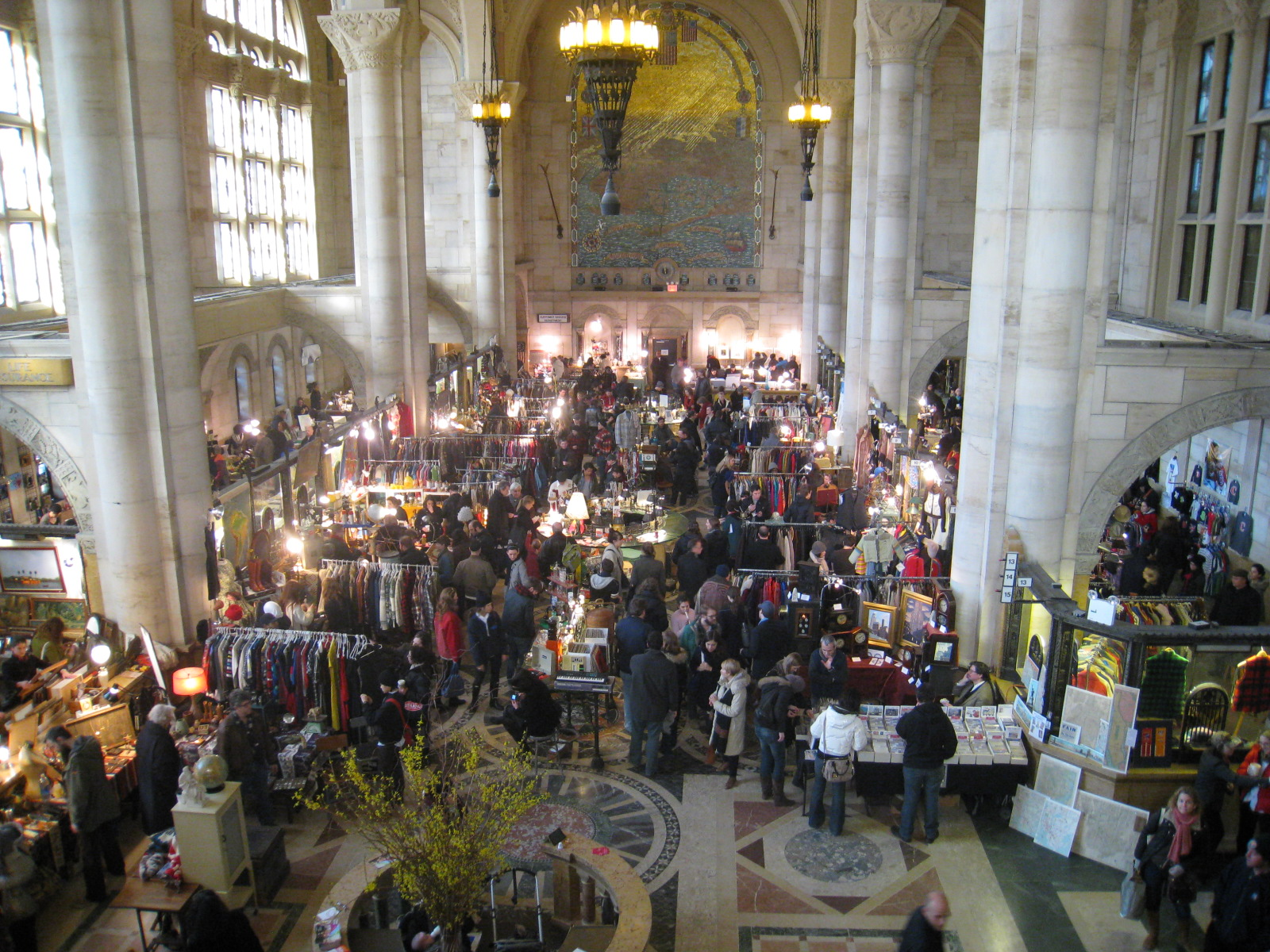
View of banking room in 2010, looking north within the nave toward the north wall

The banking room's ceiling is 63 feet (19 m) high. Sources disagree on the size of the banking room, (Note: Though the New York City Landmarks Preservation Commission cites the room's footprint as measuring about 112 by 73 feet (34 by 22 m), other sources give dimensions of 128 by 72 feet (39 by 22 m), including the ladies' lounge on the south wall.) which is oriented north–south. The interior layout includes several spaces that are similar to those found in a church. The room's central nave, for clients and bank officers, was flanked to the east and west by aisles with tellers' desks. At the north end of the banking room, officers worked in a chancel separated from the rest of the space by a low barrier. At the southwestern corner of the banking room, another low barrier delineated the new-accounts area, which had a fireplace. The former mezzanine-level ladies' lounge, above the lobby, has a balustrade overlooking the south end of the banking room.

The floors are paved in multicolored marble; the nave's floor features Cosmati-style rectangles in a grid. Within the room are tellers' windows, which include metal grilles decorated with animals and zodiac figures. Originally, the banking room contained a circular information desk supported by multicolored columns. The new accounts area at the southwestern corner and the officers' area to the north were shielded by screens. Also within the banking room were "check tables" with glass surfaces and metal frames.

The lowest portions of the banking room's walls are made of yellow marble, while the remainders of the walls are made of cast stone. On the western wall, there is a decorative fireplace and small arched windows topped by the massive arches. To the south are three round arches from the lobby, with decorative marble columns that support the ladies' lounge. On the northern or rear wall is a mosaic artwork depicting the Williamsburgh Savings Bank, surrounded by landmarks and motifs that represent Brooklyn and its history. It was installed by Ravenna Mosaics and is attributed to "Wagner" of Germany. The north and south walls also contain balustrades with analog clocks.

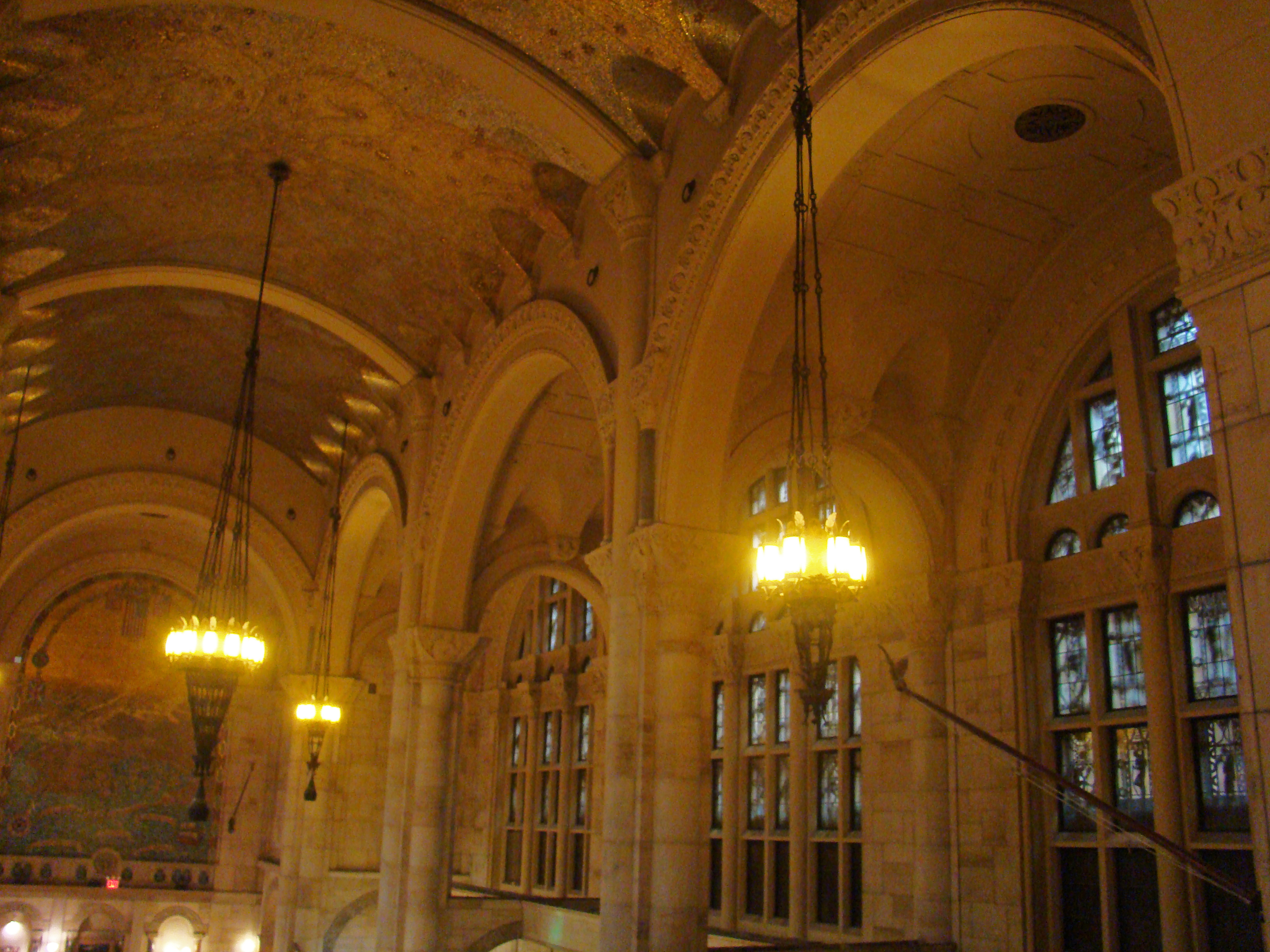
View of the nave's barrel-vaulted ceiling, with the west aisle visible at right. Arches separate the nave from the aisle and also span the top of the aisle.

Cast-stone piers separate the aisles from the nave and are topped by carved capitals depicting various figures, which represent "reasons to save". Each pier is four stories high, and there are one-story-high diagonal steel beams behind each capital. Round-arched openings and taller arches rise above each aisle. The side aisles contain barrel-vaulted ceilings, while the nave and the banking room's north and south ends have cast-stone barrel vaults. The nave's ceiling vault also has a blue-and-gold glass mosaic depicting zodiac symbols and the corresponding mythological figures. The mosaic, created by Angelo Magnanti, is hung from the steel frame. There are chandeliers throughout the room.

==== Basement ====
The terrazzo floor of the basement lobby is laid in a grid pattern. The walls are made of marble, and there is a stairway to the main elevator lobby on the western wall. The basement lobby's plaster ceiling is a saucer vault containing a central chandelier. The bank's vaults and the subway lobby were accessible from the basement lobby.

The bank's vaults were spread across three basement levels. Originally, there were 10,000 drawers for depositors in the main vault. The depositors' vault was sealed by doors measuring around 8 feet (2.4 m) wide and 5 feet (1.5 m) thick. (Note: The Brooklyn Daily Eagle wrote in 1929 that the doors weighed 36 short tons (32 long tons; 33 t), while The New York Times wrote in 2002 that the doors weighed 60 short tons (54 long tons; 54 t).) Three such doors existed in total. The steel doors were being removed by the 2000s when the banking hall and basement were converted into a commercial space. The subway lobby has a plaster ceiling, revolving doors, and a decorative security fence. Outside the subway lobby, a passageway connects directly with the LIRR's Atlantic Terminal and the subway. In the 2020s, a cogeneration plant was added in the basement; the plant uses heat exhausted by the apartments.

==== Upper stories ====
Immediately above the main banking floor were three mezzanines for the Williamsburgh Savings Bank; (Note: Two sources from 1929 describe the building as having three mezzanines in the front and four in the rear.) these spaces contained executive offices and were also used to conduct bank transactions. The remainder of the Williamsburgh Savings Bank Tower was originally rented out as offices. To maximize usable space, the architects spaced the superstructure's columns as far apart as possible. Each story was designed with an area of 2,600 to 11,000 square feet (240 to 1,020 m^{2}). The highest office story was floor 29, right below the clock tower.

At the time of the Williamsburgh Savings Bank Tower's construction, elevators in typical high-rise buildings were clustered around a central core. The presence of the ground-story banking room prevented the construction of a central core, so the tower's elevators were instead placed at the southeast corner, connecting both to the offices above and the LIRR and subway stations in the basement. The upper stories were served by twelve elevators, and the Williamsburgh Savings Bank's president had a private elevator. Following the 2000s renovation, the building was converted into 179 residential condominiums. (Note: The Wall Street Journal gives a different figure of 189 condominiums.) The units had a common room with a terrace, as well as a playroom and a shared business center. One example of a larger unit is a three-bedroom apartment with beamed ceilings, wooden floors, and nine windows on two elevations. Some of the penthouse apartments cover a full story, and there is a duplex unit adjacent to the former observation deck. One apartment is a 3,263-square-foot (303.1 m^{2}), four-story penthouse.

== Impact ==
=== Architectural commentary ===
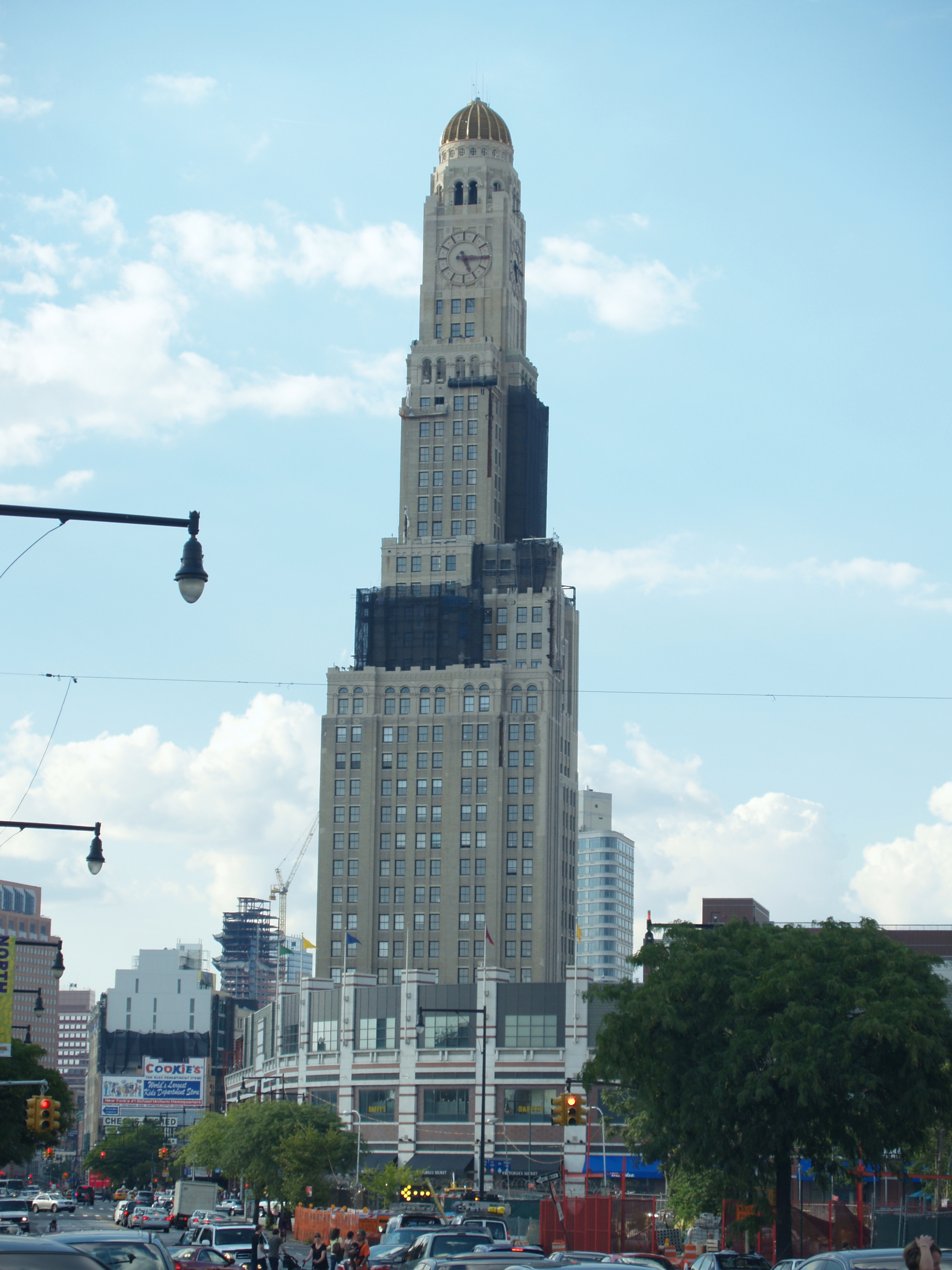
For many years, the Williamsburgh Savings Bank Tower was Brooklyn's tallest building.

The New York Daily News said in early 1928 that the tower "will be the pioneer skyscraper of unusual beauty in its vicinity", while the Brooklyn Times-Union stated that the building was an "architectural triumph" that would raise nearby properties' values. When the tower was completed, the Brooklyn Citizen said that the tower was not only a monument to the Williamsburgh Savings Bank but also one of several major commercial developments near Atlantic Terminal. Within a year of the tower's completion, the Brooklyn Daily Eagle said that a business hub had been developed around the LIRR terminal.

A New York Times writer characterized the building in 1972 as "possibly America's funniest skyscraper" and likened its interior to an ornate movie set. Christopher Gray of the Times wrote that the designs of the lobby and banking hall were "designed to make every depositor feel like a millionaire". In a book about Brooklyn's buildings, historian Francis Morrone described the Williamsburgh Savings Bank Tower as among the city's greatest skyscrapers and surpassing Halsey, McCormack & Helmer's design for the neighboring Hanson Place Church. Some observers compared the massing to a phallus: the 2010 edition of the AIA Guide to New York City called the dome "New York's most exuberant phallic symbol", and the author Jonathan Ames created a "Most Phallic Building" contest after writing in Slate magazine that the tower was the most phallic building he had ever seen.

The tower was supposed to have been the first of a series of skyscrapers near Downtown Brooklyn. In the decade before the Williamsburgh Savings Bank Tower's completion, four structures had held the record of Brooklyn's tallest building. Eric Nash wrote in 2005 that the building was supposed to compete with Manhattan's skyline both financially and aesthetically. The onset of the Great Depression had led to the cancellation of other high-rise projects nearby. Despite this, Paul Goldberger wrote for the Times in 1988 that the lack of nearby skyscrapers did not negatively affect the cityscape, and another Times writer described the Williamsburgh Savings Bank Tower in 2001 as one of the few structures in Brooklyn's skyline that could be recognized from afar. It was only in the 2010s that several taller skyscrapers in Brooklyn were built. The largest of these, the 1,066-foot (325 m) Brooklyn Tower, is over twice the Williamsburgh Savings Bank Tower's height.

Through the late 20th century, local residents used the building both as a clock and as a landmark for giving out directions. A 1982 article for the Daily News described the Williamsburgh Savings Bank and its tower as a symbol of "who really runs Brooklyn". The high concentration of dentists as tenants led the Daily News to call the building "the mecca of dentistry" in the 2000s. The New York Observer said in 2006 that the tower and the Brooklyn Bridge were likely the only "skyline landmarks" in Brooklyn.

=== In media ===
Several television series and movies have used the tower as a filming location. These have included the film Prizzi's Honor, the TV series Gotham, the film Going in Style, and the film John Wick: Chapter 3 – Parabellum. It was also the fictional setting of a romantic sequence in the film Spider-Man: Across the Spider-Verse.

== See also ==
- List of New York City Designated Landmarks in Brooklyn
- List of tallest buildings in New York City

Records
Preceded by Montague–Court Building	Tallest building in Brooklyn; 1929–2009	Succeeded by Brooklyner
