= Mancini Duffy =

American architecture and interior design firm

Mancini•Duffy
- Founded: 1986; 40 years ago
- Headquarters: Eighth Avenue
- Website: www.manciniduffy.com

Mancini Duffy (stylized as Mancini•Duffy) is a New York City-based architecture and interior design firm. Mancini Duffy was formed by the 1986 merger of Ralph Mancini Associates, Inc. (established in 1981) and Duffy Inc. (established in 1955). In 2011, it acquired certain assets of the interior design firm TSC Design (established in 1995). The firm provides a full range of interior planning, design, and architecture services as well as specialized services such as CAFM, strategic planning, and workplace strategy; graphics and signage; identity and brand development; and product design.

Mancini Duffy is the operating name of Halsey, McCormack & Helmer, Inc. Originally established in 1915 as Thomas Bruce Boyd Architect, Inc., the corporation reorganized in 1920 and changed its name to Halsey, McCormack & Helmer, Inc. The firm was noted for its prestigious banking projects, including the Williamsburgh Savings Bank Tower in Brooklyn, New York; it was purchased by Duffy Inc. in 1967.

High-profile projects include headquarters relocations for JPMorgan Chase, CIT Group, Condé Nast Publications, and AOL; a headquarters build-out for Time Warner at Time Warner Center; new television studios and production facilities for NBC Sports Group in Stamford, CT; and an ongoing renovation of Bloomingdale's flagship store in Manhattan. The firm placed at #54 in Interior Design's 2012 "Giants" survey.

Mancini Duffy was a former tenant of Two World Trade Center until its New York offices were destroyed in the September 11 attacks. Its New York office is currently in Midtown Manhattan.

== See also ==
- Dollar Savings Bank Building – Designed by Halsey, McCormack and Helmer, built 1932–1952, listed on the National Register of Historic Places
- People's Bank and Trust Company Building – Designed by Halsey, McCormack and Helmer, built 1931, listed on the National Register of Historic Places
