= Starrett City Associates =

Starrett City Associates is a group of investors, led by Disque Deane, that owned the Starrett City housing complex in Brooklyn, New York City until 2008. The firm is best known for unsuccessfully defending a landmark civil rights lawsuit that concerned "reverse discrimination" and racial quotas in the housing complex, and for controversy during the sale of the development in the mid-2000s.

== History ==
Starrett City was constructed from 1972 to 1975, as part of the Fresh Creek Urban Renewal Act to develop the area now known as Spring Creek, Brooklyn. At the time it was built, Starrett City was the largest housing development in the nation, and remains the largest federally subsidized apartment complex.

=== Discrimination charges ===
In 1980, the NAACP initiated a class-action suit against Starrett City Associates and charged that the owner of the housing complex attempted to maintain racial quotas by selective approval of tenants based on racial and ethnic profiles. The quotas caused minority applicants to wait longer than white applicants for spaces in the complex. Starrett City Associates argued that the quotas were necessary to maintain racial balance. In other words, if the quotas had not been in place, the population would have been disproportionately non-white. The New York State Division of Housing and Community Renewal was also named as a defendant in the suit because it had oversight of the public money spent to build the project and allowed the quotas to exist. The case was appealed to the United States Supreme Court in the fall of 1988, and the court ruled against Starrett.

In 1990, Starrett proposed to make apartments available to Soviet Jews who came to the United States in order to maintain racial diversity.

=== Sale of Starrett City ===
In early 2007, Starrett City Associates attempted to sell Starrett City for $1.3 billion to Clipper Equity LLC, a partnership of David Bistricer and Sam Levinson. The sale was ultimately unsuccessful due to public opposition. However, Clipper Equity made another attempt in August 2007. A renewed effort to sell the property began in June 2008. Starrett City Associates finally sold the complex in September 2017.
