= BellTel Lofts =

Residential building in Brooklyn, New York

- The New York Telephone Building, now the BellTel Lofts (2026)
- Interactive map of the BellTel Lofts area
- Alternative names: 101 Willoughby Street, 365 Bridge Street, New York Telephone Building

General information
- Type: Residential and commercial (mostly residential)
- Architectural style: Art Deco
- Location: 101 Willoughby Street, Brooklyn, New York, U.S.
- Coordinates: 40°41′33″N 73°59′06″W
- Construction started: 1929
- Completed: 1931
- Opening: October 28, 1931

Height
- Height: 348 ft (106 m)

Technical details
- Floor count: 27
- Floor area: 401,418 ft^{2} (37,293.0 m^{2})

Design and construction
- Architect: Ralph Thomas Walker
- Main contractor: Cauldwell–Wingate Company

New York City Landmark
- Designated: September 21, 2004
- Reference no.: 2144

The BellTel Lofts (formerly the New York Telephone Company Building, 101 Willoughby Street, and 7 MetroTech Center) is a mostly residential building at 101 Willoughby Street and 365 Bridge Street in the Downtown Brooklyn neighborhood of New York City. Constructed from 1929 to 1931 as the headquarters for the New York Telephone Company, it is located at the northeast corner of Willoughby and Bridge Streets. It was one of several Art Deco-style telecommunications buildings designed by Ralph Thomas Walker of Voorhees, Gmelin and Walker in the early 20th century. The building was renovated into a residential complex in the mid-2000s.

The BellTel Lofts measures 348 ft (106 m) tall, with 27 above-ground stories and three basements. Its design is influenced by German Expressionism, with Art Deco detailing, and derives much of its decoration from the arrangement of the bricks. The building's shape features a largely symmetrical massing and numerous setbacks with decorative parapets. At ground level, the main entrance is recessed at the center of the western facade on Bridge Street, while most of the remaining ground-story openings are metal-and-glass storefronts. On the upper stories, the facade is divided vertically into multiple bays and taper to a tower on the top nine stories. When 101 Willoughby Street was constructed, the ground story contained a lobby and auditorium, while the upper stories were used as offices. Since the 2000s, the building has contained 250 residential units, designed by Beyer Blinder Belle.

In 1929, the New York Telephone Company decided to construct 101 Willoughby Street, consolidating operations from several other buildings, including the company's old headquarters at 81 Willoughby Street. Plans for the new structure were filed in November 1929, and the building formally opened on October 28, 1931, as New York Telephone's second-largest building. The New York Telephone Company continued to occupy the building through the late 20th century, with thousands of employees there. Part of the building was renovated into a training center in the late 1980s, and the New York City Landmarks Preservation Commission designated the building as a city landmark in 2004. The building was sold in February 2005 to David Bistricer for $68 million, and his company Clipper Equities converted the structure to a residential condominium complex. Although sales of the condo units began in October 2006, many of the apartments remained unsold for several years.

== Site ==
The BellTel Lofts is located at 101 Willoughby Street in the Downtown Brooklyn neighborhood of New York City. It occupies a rectangular land lot on the northeastern corner of Bridge and Willoughby Streets. The site has frontage of 255 ft (78 m) on Bridge Street to the west and 100 ft (30 m) on Willoughby Street to the south, with an area of 25,500 ft^{2} (2,370 m^{2}). Nearby buildings include the Brooklyn Commons (formerly MetroTech) to the north; the Duffield Street Houses to the east; 388 Bridge Street and AVA DoBro to the south; and the Brooklyner and 81 Willoughby Street to the west. In addition, entrances to the New York City Subway's Jay Street–MetroTech station, served by the A, C, F, <F>, and R trains, are just outside the building.

== Architecture ==
The building was designed by Ralph Walker of Voorhees, Gmelin and Walker in the Art Deco style. The BellTel Lofts was one of several Art Deco buildings in the New York City area that Walker designed, after the Barclay–Vesey Building (1927), the New Jersey Bell Headquarters Building (1929), and 60 Hudson Street (1930). It was followed by 1 Wall Street (1931) and 32 Avenue of the Americas (1932), as well as telephone buildings in Upstate New York. The structure is 348 ft (106 m) tall, with 27 stories.

=== Form and facade ===
The building's facade is made largely of reddish-brown brick, and its massing contains multiple setbacks. Though setbacks in New York City skyscrapers were mandated by the 1916 Zoning Resolution in order to allow light and air to reach the streets below, they later became a defining feature of the Art Deco style. Some sections of the building are set back at a higher story than others, which gives the massing an irregular appearance, even though Walker had placed the setbacks symmetrically along the exterior. The building contains 27 above-ground stories, with a nine-story base and subsequent setbacks at the 9th, 12th, and 15th stories. Above the 18th floor, the building rises into a smaller "tower". The massing is akin to that at 32 Avenue of the Americas.

A brick facade was used for the BellTel Lofts and for Walker's other communications buildings, since he preferred the material for its texture and its flexibility in color combinations. The BellTel Lofts' facade incorporated about 2.649 million bricks and 1,141 windows. The building's decoration was largely derived from subtle changes in the color of the brick, as well as the placement of the bricks themselves. The main elevations of the facade, on Willoughby and Bridge Streets, both contain a central section where the bricks are laid at slightly different depths, giving a curtain-like appearance. In an allusion to German Expressionism, several of the entrances have stepped entrance arches and are surrounded by brickwork laid in a pattern suggestive of weaving. Additionally, the parapets atop some of the setbacks have interlocked, three-dimensional vertical and horizontal motifs and are topped by cast-stone copings. Unlike in his earlier Barclay–Vesey Building where Walker used organic decorations, the BellTel Lofts' design incorporates geometric shapes such as lozenges, starbursts, and chevrons.

==== Ground level ====
The water table just above the ground is made of granite, while the rest of the facade is clad in orange brick. The bricks on the ground story are laid such that the header, the narrowest surface of each brick, faces outward. The headers are interrupted at regular intervals by horizontal bands of bricks in which the stretcher, or long narrow surface, of each brick faces outward; the stretchers are laid vertically. At ground level, the western elevation, facing Bridge Street, is divided into twelve double-width openings; each of the ground-story openings corresponds vertically to two bays on the upper stories. The main entrance is the sixth opening from the south and is flanked by a single-width bay on either side. The southern elevation, along Willoughby Street, is divided into four double-width openings; the two outermost openings contain entrances.

On the building's western elevation, facing Bridge Street, the main entrance is near the center of the facade. The entrance is through a double-height recessed doorway that contains four doors made of metal and glass. A sign with the words "Bell Telephone" is placed above the center two doors, and a glass-and-metal transom window stretches across the entire doorway. Above the transom window, the bricks are laid in vertical patterns. There are six openings to the left (north) and five to the right (south) of the main entrance. The northernmost openings contains a service entrance with metal doors, framed by brickwork in a woven pattern. The remaining openings on Bridge Street contain tripartite display windows and transom windows with metal frames. Above the transom windows are decorative abstract metalwork that is placed in front of the brick facade.

On Willoughby Street, there are four openings at ground level. The two center openings contain tripartite display and transom windows with metal frames, similar to those on Bridge Street. The two outer openings contain entrances, which are framed by brickwork in a woven pattern, similar to the service entrance on Bridge Street. The doorway to the left (west) contains four metal-and-glass doors topped by transom windows. The doorway to the right (east) is similar but is recessed within a vestibule and has a bronze gate. The vestibule in the easternmost opening is illuminated by a bronze chandelier and contains a set of metal-and-glass doors and transom windows.

==== Upper stories ====
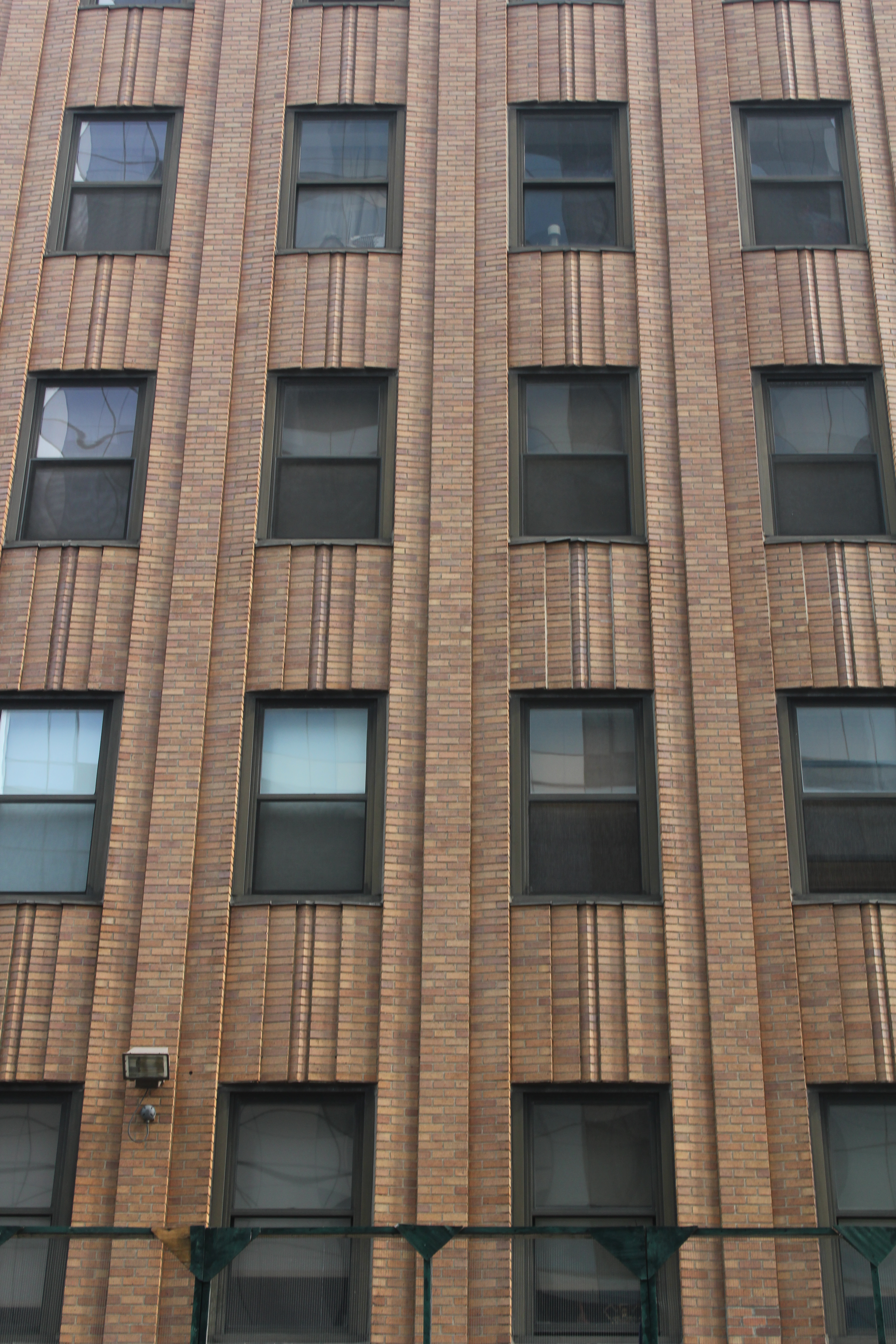
The center section of the Bridge Street facade, with undulating brick

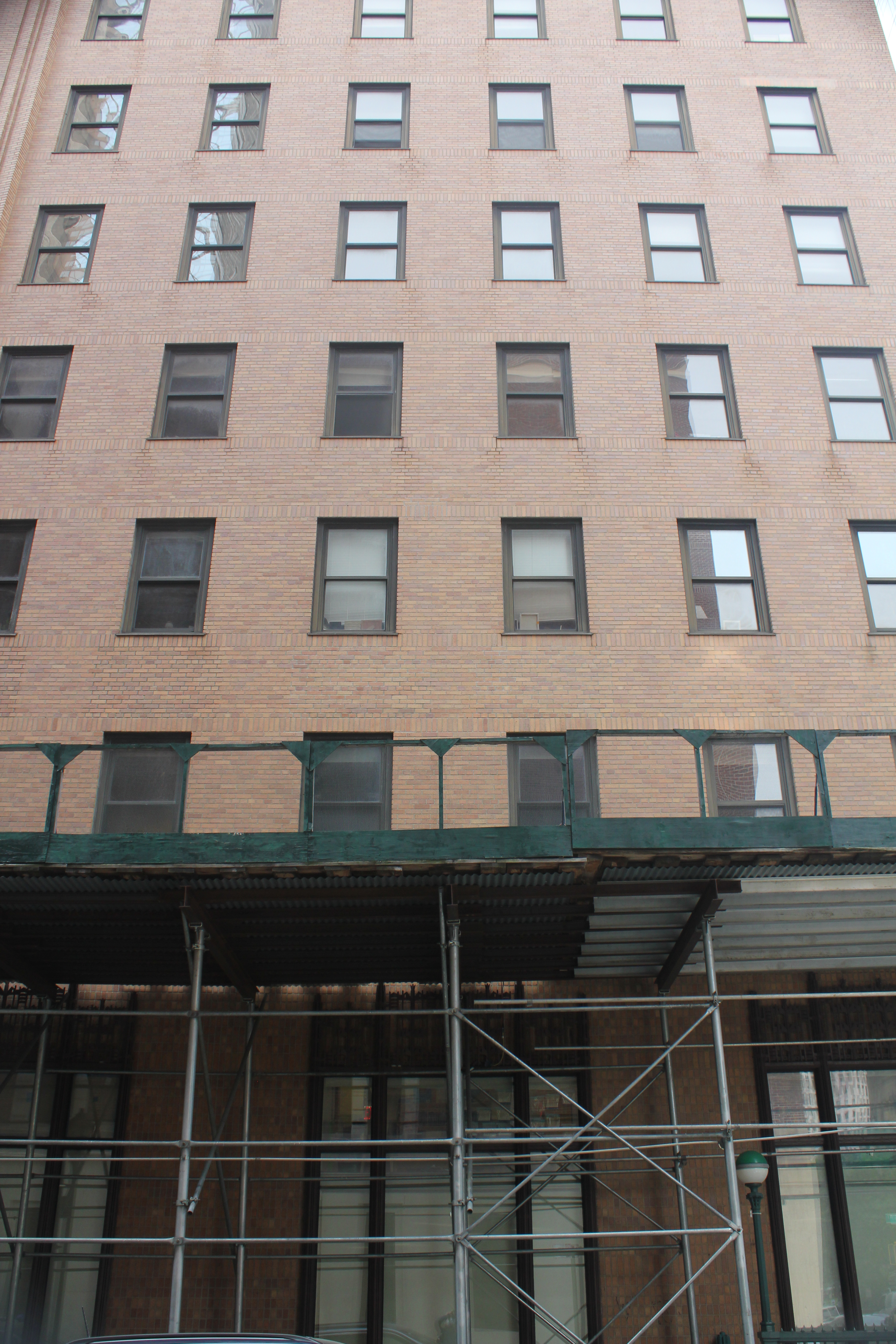
The southern section of the Bridge Street facade, with flat brick

On Bridge Street, the upper stories are divided slightly asymmetrically into 26 bays: a northern section of eight bays, a center section of 12 bays, and a southern section of six bays. Each bay contains one aluminum sash window per story. The brickwork in the center section is laid vertically in a manner that resembles undulating curtains. Walker had used a similar effect in his designs for 60 Hudson Street and 1 Wall Street. The middle eight bays of the central section set back at the 9th and 12th stories, while the two bays on either side continue as bulkheads that set back at the 13th story. The center six bays set back again at the 15th story, flanked by two-bay-wide bulkheads that set back at the 17th story. The bulkheads were intended to draw attention to the central bays of the center section. Further setbacks occur at the 18th, 23rd, and 26th stories, where the building tapers into a tower that is only four bays wide.

The northern and southern sections on Bridge Street both contain flat facades, which derive their ornamentation by the orientation of the brick. Much of the brickwork on both sections is composed of stretcher bricks (which are laid flat with their long narrow sides exposed). On each story, the sills below the windows and lintels above the windows are connected horizontally by courses of soldier bricks (which are laid vertically with their long narrow sides exposed). The northern and southern sections contain symmetrical setbacks at the 9th, 12th, 15th, and 18th stories; each setback contains parapets with brick patterns.

The southern elevation on Willoughby Street is ten bays wide above the first story. The six center bays have an undulating brick facade, with setbacks at the 9th, 11th, 13th, and 15th stories; each of these setbacks has a parapet with undulating brick bands. The two outer bays on either side have a flat brick facade, ornamented only by courses of stretcher and soldier bricks. These outer bays set back at the 9th, 12th, and 15th stories. Above the 18th story, the southern elevation of the tower is only four bays wide. The eastern elevation has both undulating and flat brick decoration, similar to the Willoughby and Bridge Street elevations, but the eastern wall does not have many walls. There are several setbacks on the eastern elevation, which taper into the tower above the 18th story. The northern elevation cannot be seen from the street level but has windows. Various equipment is placed above each setback.

=== Interior ===
The superstructure of the BellTel Lofts contains 6,571 short tons (5,867 long tons; 5,961 t) of steel, while the building was illuminated by 3,300 lighting fixtures. It had a total floor area of 320,000 ft^{2} (30,000 m^{2}) when completed. According to the New York City Department of City Planning, the modern-day building contains 401,418 ft^{2} (37,293.0 m^{2}) in gross floor area.

==== Original use ====
When the building was constructed, the ground story was intended as a business center for Downtown Brooklyn office workers. According to contemporary sources, was "arranged to provide a convenient and comfortable place for patrons to conduct their telephone business transactions". The main entrance was placed on Willoughby Street, where a corridor connected with an elevator lobby. Another corridor led from the entrance on Bridge Street to the elevator lobby. Twelve elevators connected the ground story with the upper stories, operating at a speed of 700 ft/min (210 m/min); the elevators were grouped in two banks of six cabs. A 400-seat auditorium was placed near the rear of the ground story. There were also movie projection rooms, a check room, and dressing rooms. By the 2010s, the lobby retained its original design.

The building had three basement levels. The lowest two basements had boiler and machine rooms, storage space, and kitchens. The first basement, the shallowest below ground, contained employee cafeterias. The general offices of the New York Telephone Company occupied the intermediate stories, while the top stories were used as executive offices. The second through 20th stories were used as general offices. Managers occupied the next three stories, with executive offices on the 23rd floor. Although most of the building's restrooms were for male employees, there were women's restrooms on the fourth, ninth, and 15th floors.

==== Residential conversion ====
The current design of the building's interiors dates to a 2000s renovation by Beyer Blinder Belle. Since that renovation, the building has contained 250 residential units. (Note: Sometimes cited as 219 units) The smallest units are studio apartments covering 600 ft^{2} (56 m^{2}), while the largest units are duplex apartments covering 2,700 ft^{2} (250 m^{2}). Fifty-eight apartments have outdoor terraces on the setbacks. Design elements of each apartment include bamboo floors, open-plan kitchens, full-height kitchens, and 11-foot (3.4 m) ceilings. There are 21 penthouses starting at the 19th story, which range from 1,178 to 2,715 ft^{2} (109.4 to 252.2 m^{2}) and have ceilings of between 12 and 14 ft (3.7 and 4.3 m). Each of the 20th through 26th stories have only three apartments, which share a bank of four elevators. Two of the penthouses are duplex units covering 2,700 ft^{2} (250 m^{2}), with 500-square-foot (46 m^{2}) private terraces and their own elevators.

Because the building's mechanical core could not be rebuilt, many of the apartments contained long, narrow spaces that measure up to 70 ft (21 m) long. The units also have 100 different floor plans, and some of the lower-story apartments do not have natural illumination. The 19th-floor setbacks were converted to roof decks, while the spaces at the building's base were converted to retail spaces, offices, fitness rooms, and yoga rooms. Other amenities in the building include a media room, a playroom, a bike room, storage space, and a serviced office.

== History ==
The Bell Telephone Company was established in 1877 and merged with the New England Telephone and Telegraph Company in 1879 to form the National Bell Telephone Company. One of the subsidiaries of the combined firm was the New York and New Jersey Telephone Company, which was created in 1883. The company had 16,000 subscribers by 1897; this was one of the reasons for the construction of the company's earlier building at 81 Willoughby Street, which was finished in early 1898. As early as 1922, the New York Telephone Company had sought to construct a six-story annex to its building at the northwest corner of Willoughby and Bridge Streets, extending 107 ft (33 m) along Willoughby Street and 250 ft (76 m) along Bridge Street.

=== Development ===
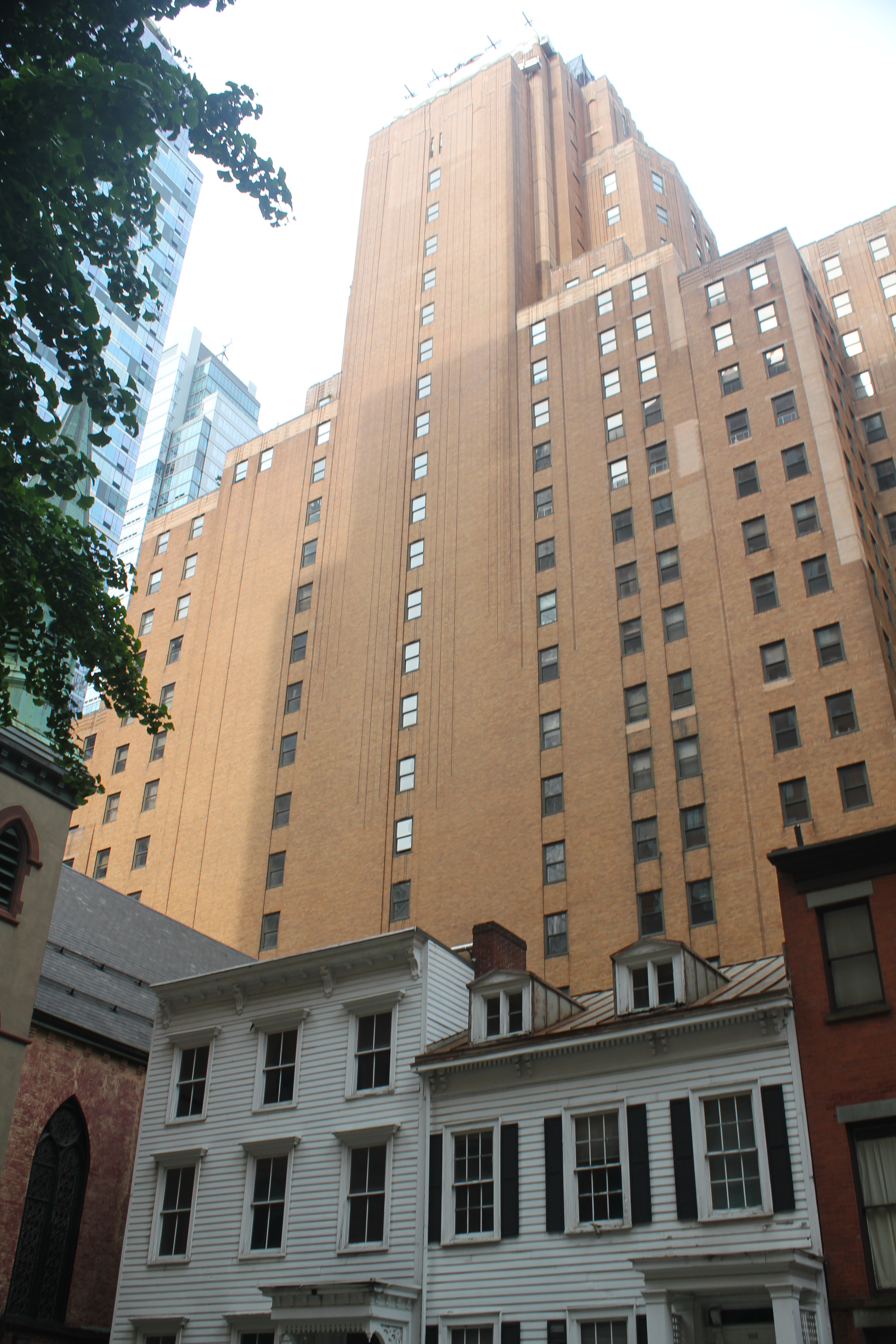
Seen from Duffield Street to the east

In September 1929, the New York Telephone Company announced that it had acquired twelve houses at the northeast corner of Willoughby and Bridge Streets, occupying a lot measuring 100 by 225 ft (30 by 69 m). The houses were to be replaced by a 23-story building at 101 Willoughby Street, which was to cost $4.5 million. New York Telephone would relocate 3,500 employees from various buildings to the new structure. The houses at Willoughby and Bridge Streets had been razed by November 1929, when the Cauldwell–Wingate Company received the construction contract. By then, the structure was to rise 27 stories and cost about $5.5 million; the structure was to include about 320,000 ft^{2} (30,000 m^{2}). Voorhees, Gmelin & Walker filed plans for the structure at the end of the month. The architects submitted an alteration plan to the Brooklyn Bureau of Buildings in August 1930, which called for three elevators to be installed at a cost of $472,000. During the building's construction, a worker died after falling down the elevator shaft.

Contractors ordered 8,000 short tons (7,100 long tons; 7,300 t) of structural steel for the building in January 1930. The steel frame had been finished by September 1930, and the facade of the lower floors had been installed. By the following January, the brickwork had been completed, and the floor slabs had been poured. In May 1931, the New York Building Congress gave awards to 27 mechanics who had helped construct 101 Willoughby Street. The structure was formally opened on October 28, 1931, as New York Telephone's second-largest building, behind the company's headquarters at the Barclay–Vesey Building in Manhattan. It was one of several skyscrapers that had been constructed in Downtown Brooklyn during the early 1930s. Workers were relocated from seven other buildings in Brooklyn, and New York Telephone's other nearby structures at 360 Bridge Street and 81 Willoughby Street continued to accommodate central office equipment.

=== Telecommunications use ===
At the time of 101 Willoughby Street's dedication, it was known as the Long Island headquarters of the New York Telephone Company, with 2,200 employees working there. The building also hosted events such as meetings of the Brooklyn Chamber of Commerce and the Civic Council of Brooklyn. The first basement also had a dark room for the company's camera club. 101 Willoughby Street was originally fueled by oil, but, during World War II, the building switched to coal to reduce energy costs. A 1941 article in the Brooklyn Daily Eagle noted that 101 Willoughby Street and the neighboring 360 Bridge Street employed 3,500 people, comprising more than half of the 5,500 employees that the company employed in Brooklyn. By 1946, the Long Island office of the New York Telephone Company had a million subscribers, nearly half of which were in Brooklyn. The number of subscribers had doubled to two million within seven years. The New York Telephone Company continued to occupy the building through the late 20th century. In the mid-1960s, the company sunk a 92-foot-deep (28 m) well so the building's air conditioning system could use groundwater.

When NYNEX was formed as a result of the breakup of the original AT&T in 1984, it occupied the New York Telephone Company's Long Island headquarters. By the late 1980s, the buildings at 101 Willoughby Street and 360 Bridge Street were used as customer service offices and contained some telephone switching equipment, although parts of these buildings were unoccupied. In conjunction with the development of MetroTech Center, NYNEX announced in early 1989 that it would renovate parts of both buildings as a training center. The refurbished space, covering 260,000 ft^{2} (24,000 m^{2}), would be known as the New York Telephone Learning Center at MetroTech, which would train about 35,000 workers annually. The project cost about $30 million, including the price of moving equipment from Manhattan. NYNEX later became known as Bell Atlantic New York by 1997, then Verizon New York by 2000.

After MetroTech was completed, the structure was known as 7 MetroTech Center, although it was not related to MetroTech itself. The Brooklyn Chamber of Commerce occupied 7 MetroTech Center during the late 1990s. The Municipal Art Society's Preservation Committee, along with local civic group Brooklyn Heights Association, began petitioning the New York City Landmarks Preservation Commission (LPC) to designate over two dozen buildings in Downtown Brooklyn as landmarks in 2003. The LPC designated 101 Willoughby Street as a landmark in September 2004, along with New York Telephone's earlier building at 81 Willoughby Street later the same year. The buildings were designated shortly after the city government had approved a development plan for Downtown Brooklyn. At the time, there was high demand for residential development in Downtown Brooklyn, and developers sought to convert office structures such as 101 Willoughby Street to residential structures.

=== Conversion to condominiums ===
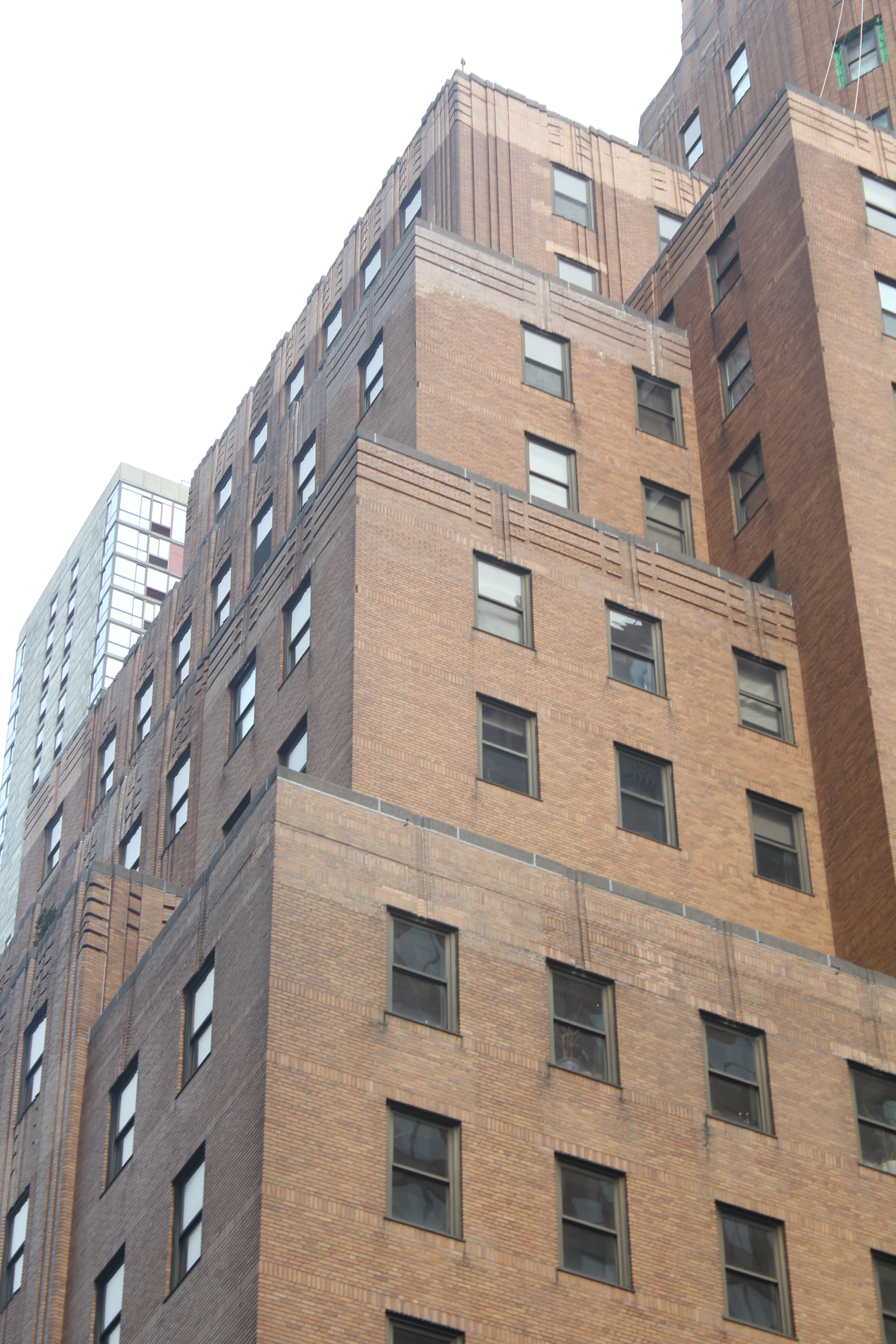
Close-up of one group of setbacks

The building was sold in February 2005 to David Bistricer, who paid Verizon $74 million. Bistricer's company Clipper Equity converted the New York Telephone Building into a residential condominium development, the BellTel Lofts, which had an address of 365 Bridge Street. The development was named after the Bell Telephone sign hanging over the Bridge Street entrance. Clipper Equity received permission from a state court to modify an injunction that had been placed against the company, allowing it to sell condos there. BellTel Lofts received a J-51 tax abatement that ran through 2024. Sales at the building began in October 2006, when the developers placed 25 units for sale. BellTel Lofts was one of several luxury developments in Downtown Brooklyn during that decade. It was also one of several commercial buildings in the neighborhood to be converted to residential use, as well as one of Downtown Brooklyn's first condominium developments.

The upper floors remained unfinished two years after sales commenced. The production team of the TV show The Real World leased one of the penthouses in 2008, during the show's 21st season, but the lease was canceled due to issues in obtaining construction permits for the show. The surrounding streets were closed to most traffic because of the presence of the MetroTech complex, so the developers advertised the building by emphasizing the "tranquility" of the area. The developers initially had a difficult time selling the apartments, as the residential conversion had been completed at the height of the 2000s United States housing bubble, and there was an overabundance of apartments in the neighborhood. The developers also had trouble leasing out 100,000 ft^{2} (9,300 m^{2}) of storefronts, and they sought a small tenant for the retail space.

By 2009, about 55 percent of the units had been sold, and BellTel's developers rented out 30 of the apartments under a program in which the renters could eventually buy the units. To attract residents, BellTel's developers offered gifts such as spa products. The General Services Administration ultimately leased the ground-floor storefronts for 10 years in 2010, using the space as a child care center for 76 children. Interest in the building's residences increased in the early 2010s after the Federal Housing Administration began offering loans to prospective buyers, allowing would-be residents to make down payments of less than $20,000. Over 130 units at the building had been sold by 2011, a number that had grown to 175 by 2013.

== Critical reception ==
When the building opened, it received the Brooklyn Chamber of Commerce's 1931 award for the best "business structure" in Brooklyn. Robert A. M. Stern, in his 1987 book New York 1930, said the massing of 101 Willoughby Street resembled that of the Paramount Building in Times Square, designed by Rapp and Rapp. Stern wrote: "Walker succeeded (where Rapp & Rapp had failed) in deftly synthesizing the individual masses."

Francis Morrone wrote in 2001 that 101 Willoughby Street "and the earlier telephone building at the northeast corner of Lawrence Street make Willoughby one of the most exciting streets in downtown Brooklyn". Christopher Gray of The New York Times referred to the building in 2008 as "a mesmerizing tower with faceted planes of orange brick, mottled in color so it reads like an undulating tapestry". According to Gray, the two telephone buildings at 81 and 101 Willoughby Street were one block apart physically but "eons apart in their architecture", contrasting number 81's Beaux-Arts design with number 101's Art Deco design. Although Jeff Vandam, also of the Times, described the BellTel Lofts in 2006 as being more obscure than the Williamsburgh Savings Bank Tower, he called the BellTel Lofts "no less impressive in its Art Deco grace".

== See also ==
- Art Deco architecture of New York City
- List of New York City Designated Landmarks in Brooklyn
- List of tallest buildings in Brooklyn
