= Starrett City =

Housing development in Brooklyn, New York

Starrett City Spring Creek Towers
- Neighborhood of Brooklyn
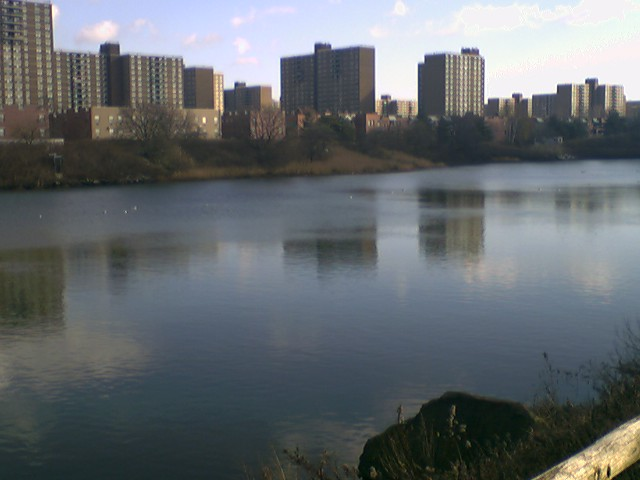
- Starrett City, seen across Fresh Creek Basin
- Location in New York City
- Coordinates: 40.648°N 73.882°W
- Country: United States
- State: New York
- City: New York City
- Borough: Brooklyn
- Community District: Brooklyn 5
- Opened: 1974
- Founder: United Housing Foundation, Starrett City Associates
- Time zone: UTC−5 (Eastern)
  - Summer (DST): UTC−4 (EDT)
- ZIP Codes: 11239
- Area codes: 718, 347, 929, and 917

Starrett City (also known as the Spring Creek Towers) is a housing development and small neighborhood in the Spring Creek section of the East New York neighborhood of Brooklyn, New York City, US. It is located on a peninsula on the north shore of Jamaica Bay, bounded by Fresh Creek and Canarsie to the west and Hendrix Creek to the east. Starrett City contains both residential and commercial buildings. The residential portion of the property contains eight "sections" in a towers in the park layout. The complex also contains a community and recreation center, as well as two schools.

Plans for developing the site of Starrett City date to 1962, when an investment group bought the property with the intention of developing a residential complex called Park Shore Village. The group ultimately withdrew from the project, and another cooperative housing project named Twin Pines Village was proposed by the United Housing Foundation in 1967. Control of the complex was handed to Starrett City Associates in 1971, and Starrett City opened in 1974. The complex assumed the name of Spring Creek Towers in 2002, though it is still popularly known as Starrett City.

Starrett City is part of Brooklyn Community District 5, and its primary ZIP code is 11239. It is patrolled by the 75th Precinct of the New York City Police Department. Politically it is represented by the New York City Council's 42nd District.

== Description ==
The Spring Creek Towers site (commonly known as Starrett City) is located on a peninsula on the north shore of Jamaica Bay, bounded by Fresh Creek to the west and Hendrix Creek to the east. The development is bound to the north by Flatlands Avenue and to the south by Seaview Avenue and the Shore Parkway section of the Belt Parkway system. Pennsylvania Avenue runs north-to-south through the complex, with Louisiana Avenue at the west end and Van Siclen Avenue at the east end.

The development originally spanned 153 acres (0.62 km^{2}) before being subdivided in 2009 as part of a refinancing. It now occupies 140 acres (57 ha), after several parcels of undeveloped land were separated out from the residential site. The housing development contains 5,881 apartment units in 46 buildings, which range from 11 to 20 stories high.

The development was designed by Herman Jessor, organized in the towers in the park layout. The buildings utilize a simple "foursquare" design. The residential portion of the property has eight "sections" each including several buildings, its own field, recreational area (jungle gym, park, handball court, basketball court) and a five-story parking garage for residents in that section. These sections are Ardsley, Bethel, Croton, Delmar, Elmira, Freeport, Geneva, and Hornell, which are each named after municipalities in New York State. The residential part of Starrett City includes eight parking garages, a community center, and two public schools. The area contains a shopping center as well. Starrett City is said to be the largest federally assisted rental property in the United States.

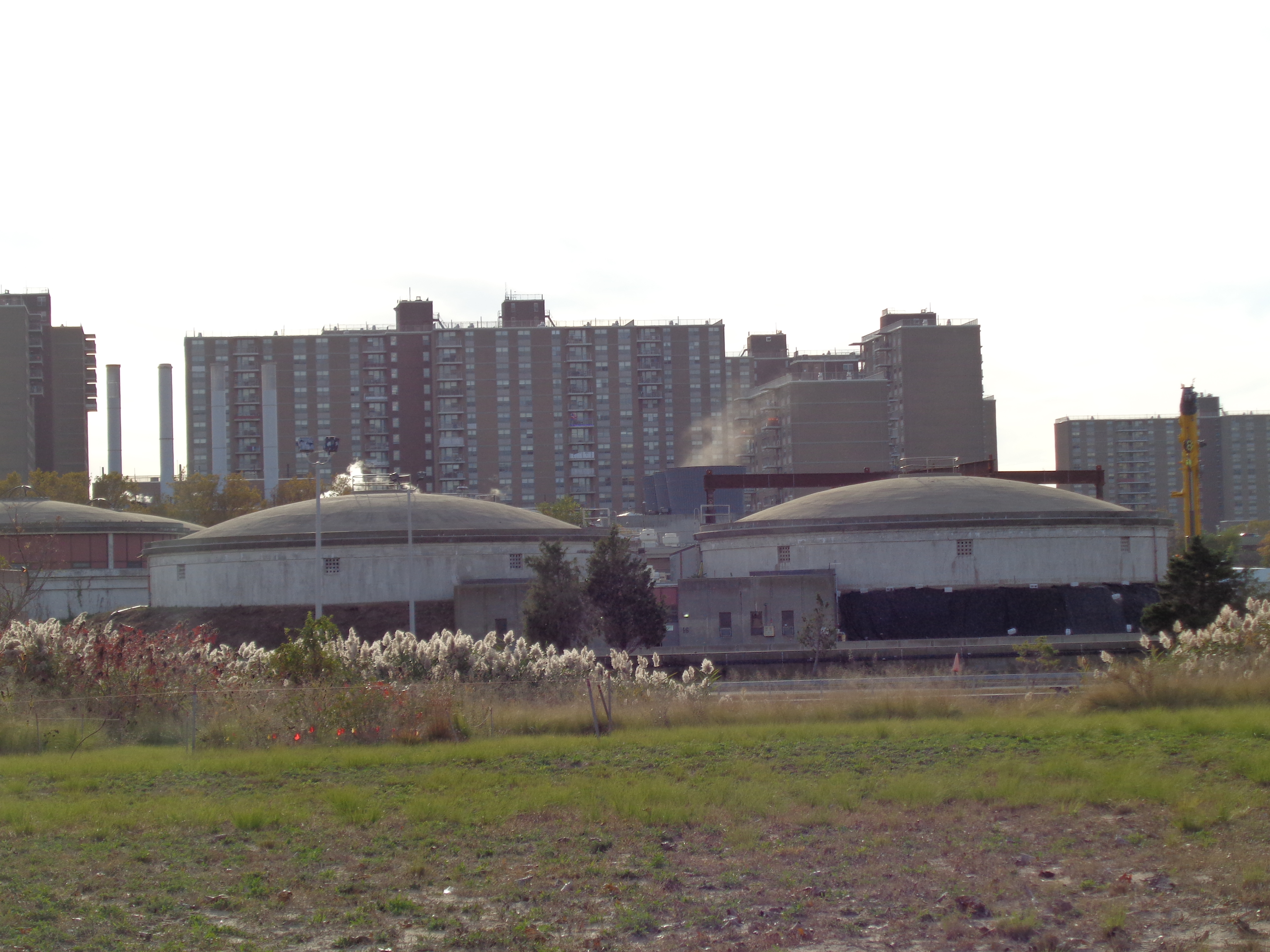
The treatment plant in Starrett City

Starrett City has its own power plant, the Starrett City Cogeneration Facility, located at 165 Elmira Loop on the east side of Starrett City. The power plant opened in 1973 and provides electricity, heating, cooling, and hot water to all residents of Starrett City. It is self-sufficient enough that during the 1977 New York City blackout, the complex was able to provide its own power. There is a sewage treatment plant next to the cogeneration facility, called the 26th Ward Wastewater Treatment Plant. The treatment plant, located on a 57.3-acre (23.2 ha) plot, can filter up to 170,000,000 US gallons (640,000,000 L) per day from the sewage systems in Brownsville, Canarsie, and East New York. The treatment plant and cogeneration facility were formerly operationally separate. However, in 1982, the city government began giving the treatment plant's methane emissions and thousands of gallons of treated cold water to the cogeneration facility, in exchange for hot water from the cogen facility.

At the southeast corner of the complex on Van Siclen Avenue is the complex's community and recreation center, which opened in 1978 and is located across the street from the treatment plant. It features a pool and tennis club, an auditorium, and other recreational facilities. It is now called the Brooklyn Sports Club. Starrett City also has its own boxing gym, Starrett City Boxing. It was also opened in 1978, inside the parking garage at Hornell Loop near the south end of the complex. It is home to many world champion boxers, including Zab Judah, Shannon Briggs, Dmitriy Salita, Luis Collazo, and Will Rosinsky.

=== Public safety ===
Starrett City is patrolled by the New York City Police Department's 75th Precinct, though primary security is assumed by its own private security force, called the Spring Creek Towers Department of Public Safety. The Spring Creek Towers security force was created because, when Starrett City opened in the 1970s, the 75th Precinct had one of the highest crime rates in New York City. In the five years after Starrett City opened, it had one of the city's lowest crime rates, mainly because of the existence of the security force. The Spring Creek Towers Department of Public Safety has been used as a case study in the advantages of private security over public policing. Edwin Donovan and William Walsh write that "Statistically, Starrett City must be considered one of the safest communities in the United States."

The Spring Creek Towers Department of Public Safety employs public safety officers, armed while on duty, to preserve the life and property of the residents of the complex. Officers enforce New York state laws as well as New York City laws. Starrett City is patrolled by officers 24 hours a day on foot, bicycles, or in vehicles.

=== Ownership and management ===
The complex is owned by Starrett City Associates, which was originally headed by Disque Deane. U.S. president Donald Trump owns 4% of the complex, inherited from his father, Fred Trump. Between January 2016 and April 15, 2017, Trump received more than $5 million in revenue from Starrett City.

=== Education ===
There are no public high schools within Starrett City; the nearest public high schools are the Academy for Young Writers and Spring Creek Community School (within the Spring Creek Educational Campus) just east on Flatlands Avenue, and the William H. Maxwell Vocational High School and Thomas Jefferson Educational Campus (formerly Thomas Jefferson High School) on Pennsylvania Avenue in the northern portions of East New York. Additionally, the Canarsie and South Shore Campuses (also formerly high schools) are located in the adjacent Canarsie neighborhood. There are four elementary and middle schools within Starrett City's boundaries:

- Abe Stark Elementary School (PS 346)
- Gateway Intermediate School (IS 364)
- Frederick Douglass Academy VIII Middle School (located on the 4th floor of PS 346)
- Be'er Hagolah, a Jewish elementary and high school

The Brooklyn Public Library's Spring Creek Branch is located just outside Starrett City's northern boundary, at the northwest corner of Flatlands and New Jersey Avenues. The single-story, 7,500 square feet (700 m^{2}) structure opened in 1977.

=== Transportation ===
When it opened, Starrett City was advertised as having convenient transportation links to the rest of the city via bus and subway. Starrett City is served by the B82 and B83 local buses, the B82 Select Bus Service, and the BM2 and BM5 express buses, all operated by MTA Regional Bus Operations. Additionally, the B6, B60 and B103 buses, also operated by the MTA, stop just north of the development. The nearest New York City Subway stations are at East 105th Street and Canarsie-Rockaway Parkway, both served by the L train.

== History ==
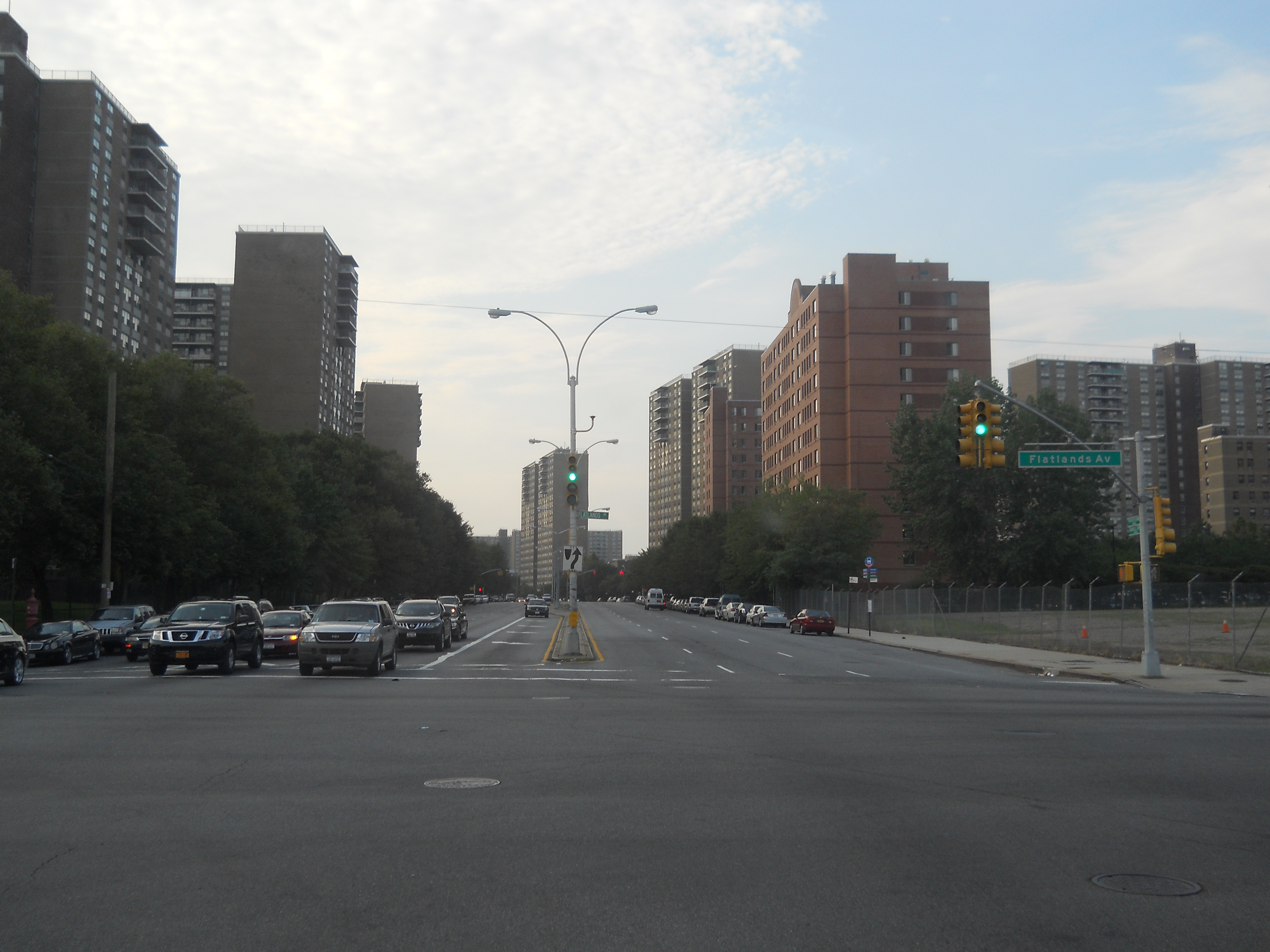
Pennsylvania Avenue, Starrett City's major artery

=== Development ===
In 1962, a California-based investment group purchased 130 acres (53 ha) of land along Pennsylvania Avenue between Flatlands Avenue and the Belt Parkway, intending to construct apartments on the property. The Thompson–Starrett Co. was retained to construct the buildings.

In March 1964, the investment group applied to the New York State Housing Finance Agency for a mortgage worth $145 million towards the development. At the time, the site was referred to as part of Canarsie. On December 1, 1964, the State Housing Finance Agency announced a project called Park Shore Village, which would construct a middle-income apartment complex on the site.

The complex would consist of 19 buildings standing 11, 17 and 21 stories high. It would also include a 40-acre (16 ha) shopping center, community center, swimming pools, and a skating rink, along with a new elementary school (PS 346) and parking for residents. Funds would be provided by loans under the Mitchell-Lama Housing Program. The development would be built in two phases, eventually housing 25,000 people. The project was approved by the New York City Planning Commission on January 20, 1965, and by the New York City Board of Estimate on February 11, 1965. Construction on the first phase was projected to start in the spring of that year and be complete by 1967, at which point the second phase would begin. However, the original investment group withdrew due to financial concerns and the project did not commence.

On June 27, 1967, Governor Nelson Rockefeller announced modified version of the project called Twin Pines Village, which would construct a cooperative on the 145-acre (59 ha) site in what was then part of Canarsie. The development would house 6,000 families. The project was now sponsored by the United Housing Foundation (UHF), who were also developing Co-op City.

Twin Pines would consist of 43 buildings, rising 11, 15, or 21 stories. Like the Park Shore plan, the development would also contain a shopping complex, community center and schools, and would sit across a portion of present-day Spring Creek Park which was then being developed as the Fountain Avenue Landfill (which has now been re-developed as Shirley Chisholm State Park). It was proclaimed as the "largest co-op ever built in Brooklyn", and would be the second largest in the city behind Co-op City, with a size comparable to that of Rochdale Village. In December 1967, the state gave the UHF $15.8 million to start construction on the Twin Pines Village complex.

The UHF abandoned the project in March 1971 after running out of money. At the time, construction had begun at the north end of the complex. Following the exit of the UHF, the project was sold to a new group of investors, including Disque Deane and Lazard Frères along with around 200 other individuals. This group would become the Starrett City Associates. The complex was renamed Starrett City and would be developed as a joint venture by the Starrett Corporation and the National Kinney Corporation. In addition, the development was changed from a co-op to rental apartments in part to make the development more profitable.

Construction resumed in mid-1972, and Pennsylvania Avenue was closed to accommodate construction. Workers started constructing towers at the south end of the site by the Belt Parkway, in an effort to attract potential tenants who were exiting from the Belt Parkway. This added one million dollars to the cost of construction, since utilities had been laid at the north end. The initial work included the filling of the swampland with sand from Jamaica Bay, and the construction of the power plant. In 1973, a contract was awarded to the Otis Elevator Company to install 100 elevators in the complex. That year, real estate developer Fred Trump acquired a 20% interest in the development. The Starrett Associates invested $22 million into the construction of the complex, while the remaining $360 million was covered by state housing loans under the Mitchell-Lama program.

=== Opening and early years ===
The complex was dedicated on October 13, 1974, in a ceremony attended by Governor Malcolm Wilson and Mayor Abraham Beame. As part of the opening, a minibus service was created to transport local residents within the development, and to shopping centers in other parts of Brooklyn. In addition, the BM2 express bus service to Manhattan was extended from Canarsie to Starrett City. At the time of opening, none of the complex's proposed 18,000 trees had been planted. Although lower-income families were not given subsidies to live in Starrett City, the development did allow residents to use state and federal housing programs to pay off part of their rent. The first 300 families were scheduled to move into the complex that November.

In January 1975, community leaders and officials proposed rerouting five bus routes and creating two new routes to serve the complex. Pennsylvania Avenue was reopened to traffic that December, sparking protests by residents who had previously used the street to play. By 1976, two thousand families had moved into Starrett City. A swimming and tennis club on Van Siclen Avenue was dedicated in July 1978. Families who lived in the complex had to pay $250 per year to use the swimming and tennis club. The swimming and tennis club was dedicated alongside a recreation center at the same location, which was open to the public. The same month, Starrett City celebrated its five thousandth resident. At this point, Starrett City was 85% rented. By 1981, the presence of Starrett City was credited with spurring six other developments in the neighborhood, including a shopping mall at Flatlands and Louisiana Avenues, as well as five housing developments.

Crime in the complex was lower than in the surrounding neighborhoods, primarily because of the presence of a private security force. On the other hand, rents at Starrett City started to rise by the late 1970s, leading to fears that existing middle-class residents might leave and be replaced by low-income residents. At the same time, Starrett City was facing financial troubles because it had been built in the aftermath of the 1975 New York City fiscal crisis. In 1980, a New York State Comptroller's report found that Starrett City would have a nearly $30 million deficit by 1984, and that rents would have to be doubled from the then-current rates in order to make up for the deficit. By 1992, Starrett City Associates was developing additional housing around the Starrett City complex. The new housing units were condominiums, targeted toward Starrett City residents and others who wanted ownership of their homes. In 1993, the Amalgamated Bank of New York loaned $1.5 million for repairs to Starrett at Spring Creek.

The complex was renamed "Starrett at Spring Creek" around 1989. On September 25, 2002, the complex was again renamed "Spring Creek Towers". The second renaming was part of a $70 million capital program to renovate the complex. The plans called for Spring Creek Towers to receive two new parks, as well as new elevators, laundry rooms, windows, and lighting.

=== 2000s ===
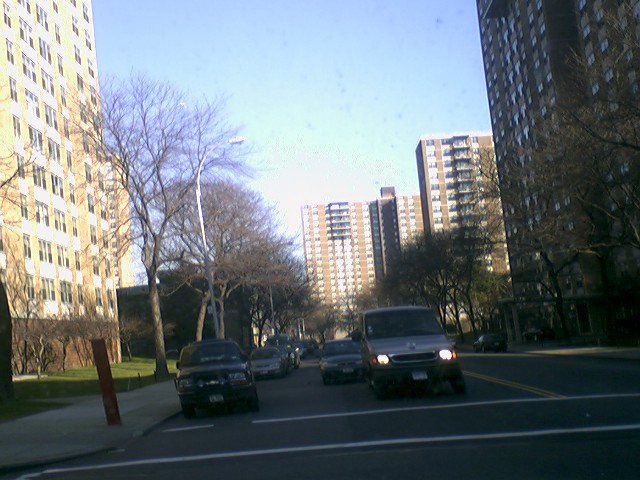
Starrett City buildings viewed from Pennsylvania Avenue

On November 30, 2006, Starrett City Associates announced an offering to sell the entire property. Since the property had met its 20-year requirement under Mitchell-Lama by the late 1990s, this raised fears that a new owner would increase rents and squeeze out current tenants. CB Richard Ellis, which brokered the Stuyvesant Town–Peter Cooper Village deal earlier in 2006, served as the listing agent.

Upon finding out about the sale, tenants at Starrett City began organizing in response to the sale of their homes. On February 8, 2007, Starrett City Associates agreed to sell the sprawling complex to David Bistricer's Clipper Equity LLC for $1.3 billion. Although Clipper Equity insisted that the complex would remain affordable, housing advocates and politicians expressed concerns about Clipper Equity's intentions. In response to HUD's rejection of the deal, Clipper Equity proposed a new bid, which included reducing operating expenses and redeveloping part of the land into new housing. Clipper Equity took other steps to garner support, including receiving informal backing from influential ministers Rev. Calvin O. Butts and Rev. A. R. Bernard. On April 7, 2007, the second proposal was also rejected by the U.S. Secretary of Housing and Urban Development, on the basis that Clipper Equity's plan for rents to reach market rate after three years failed to adequately protect residents and would require increased government subsidies to keep housing affordable. Nevertheless, Clipper Equity made another attempt in August 2007.

In June 2008, Starrett City Associates reached an agreement with federal, state, and city officials on a sale process that would ensure that the property remained affordable. This agreement was further buttressed by federal legislation, which made preserving the property as affordable housing easier for a new buyer. Starrett City Associates requested permission to refinance the buildings in April 2009 for about $500 million. The syndicate proposed to spend $40 million upgrading the buildings, and it planned to keep Starrett City's apartments within the Mitchell-Lama program for at least 30 years. In exchange, Starrett City Associates was allowed to develop some of the development's vacant lots, and it would receive an annual tax abatement of $12 million. A refinancing of the complex was finalized in late 2009.

=== 2010s to present ===
Starrett City Associates sought to refinance the buildings again by 2016. Media sources reported in September 2017 that the complex was being sold to the Brooksville Company and Rockpoint Group for $850 million. At the time, Donald Trump owned a 4% share, while other members of his family owned an additional 16%. However, disagreements soon developed between two groups affiliated with Disque Deane, who had died in 2010 and left his estate to his third wife Carol G. Deane and their two children. Carol, who managed Starrett City Associates following Disque's death. became involved in a lawsuit with a collective that included four of Disque's children; one of his former partners; and LIHC Investment Group and Belveron Partners, who were also interested in purchasing the complex. The two groups sued each other in New York Supreme Court over allegations that Carol's sale of Starrett City to Brooksville and Rockpoint did not maximize profits for shareholders. The lawsuit was later dismissed, and the sale of Starrett City was finalized on May 8, 2018, at a cost of $905 million.

A group of anonymous investors sold a 71% stake to Brooksville and Rockpoint for $1.8 billion in August 2021. The next month, Brooksville and Rockpoint acquired full ownership of the complex after acquiring Belveron Partners' 13% stake. Also in 2021, Governor Andrew Cuomo announced that Starrett City's affordable-housing protections would be preserved through 2069 and that the owners would spend $140 million renovating the buildings.

== Community and demographics ==
Starrett City is a racially diverse neighborhood. Based on data from the 2010 United States census, the population of Starrett City was 13,354, a change of −1,267 (−9.5%) from the 14,621 counted in 2000. Covering an area of 291.08 acres (117.80 ha), the neighborhood had a population density of 45.9 inhabitants per acre (29,400/sq mi; 11,300/km^{2}). (Note: This area also includes surrounding land that is not developed or is not part of the co-op complex itself.) The racial makeup of the neighborhood was 24.7% (3,293) White, 52.7% (7,036) African American, 0.2% (29) Native American, 2.9% (389) Asian, 0% (2) Pacific Islander, 0.3% (37) from other races, and 1.4% (184) from two or more races. Hispanic or Latino people of any race were 17.9% (2,384) of the population.

=== Census ===
In of the 2020 United States census, Black Americans (primarily African Americans) were about 60% of the area's population, White and Hispanic Americans each comprised around 20%, and Asian residents consisted of about 2-3% of the area's population.

=== Racial quota controversies ===
Since its opening in 1974, Starrett City filled vacancies under an alleged affirmative action racial formula in which 70% of vacant apartments went to non-Hispanic white families, and the remaining 30% went to minority families. In 1977, the minority makeup was 19% black, 9% Hispanic, and 2% Asian. By 1979, the proportion of white residents had declined to 64%. At the time, most of the advertisements for Starrett City featured white applicants, but much of the resulting applicant pool was black or Hispanic. As a result of the quotas, black applicants who wanted apartments in Starrett City waited almost eight times as long as white applicants. By 1983, the complex's 5,881 apartments were fully occupied, and three-fourths of the 6,000 families on Starrett City's waiting list were minorities.

In 1979, the NAACP initiated a class-action suit against Starrett City Associates. The plaintiffs stated that the complex attempted to maintain racial quotas by selective approval of tenants based on racial and ethnic profiles. An agreement was made in May 1984. Starrett City Associates agreed to increase the minority quota by 5%, so that the ratio of non-Hispanic white to minority families was 65 to 35%. The formula was supported by many black and Hispanic residents and some civil rights groups.

In June 1984, the Reagan administration sued Starrett City over the racial quota system, stating that it violated federal anti-discrimination laws. The original accord was approved by federal judge Edward Raymond Neaher of the U.S. District Court for the Eastern District of New York in April 1985, but the ruling did not affect the Reagan administration's lawsuit. In 1987, Neaher ruled on the federal government's lawsuit, stating that the quotas violated the Civil Rights Act of 1968, thereby invalidating the quotas. In March 1988, a panel of the United States Court of Appeals for the Second Circuit ruled two to one that the lower court's order to prevent quotas must stand. The Supreme Court declined to review the case in 1988. By then, under Starrett City Associates' quota system, 62% of apartments were rented to whites, 23% to blacks, 9% to Hispanics and 6% to other minority groups.

The group agreed to stop using quotas in November 1988. After losing the court case, Starrett City did not immediately start taking families from the 80% African-American waiting list to fill vacancies. Instead, they left apartments empty and attempted to rent them at market rate to those who would not qualify for subsidies. In July 1990, Starrett City Associates proposed to make apartments available to Soviet Jews who came to the United States in order to maintain racial diversity. However, critics stated that this was a move to circumvent the judicial ruling. Starrett City Associates rescinded their proposal to rent to Soviet Jews after heavy criticism.

New York State instead housed the Soviet Jewish families in Co-op City, a similar development in the Bronx.

== See also ==
- Cooperative Village
- LeFrak City
- Marcus Garvey Village
- Parkchester, Bronx
- Parkfairfax, Virginia
- Parkmerced, San Francisco
- Park La Brea, Los Angeles
- Penn South
- Riverton Houses
