= 81 Willoughby Street =

Commercial building in Brooklyn, New York

- (2026)
- Interactive map of the 81 Willoughby Street area
- Alternative names: New York and New Jersey Telephone and Telegraph Building

General information
- Type: Commercial
- Architectural style: Beaux-Arts and Renaissance Revival
- Location: 81 Willoughby Street, Brooklyn, New York, U.S.
- Coordinates: 40.6923°N 73.9861°W
- Construction started: 1896
- Completed: 1898
- Owner: 81 Willoughby LLC

Technical details
- Floor count: 8
- Floor area: 73,860 ft^{2} (6,862 m^{2})

Design and construction
- Architect: Rudolphe L. Daus

New York City Landmark
- Designated: June 29, 2004
- Reference no.: 2156

81 Willoughby Street (formerly the New York and New Jersey Telephone and Telegraph Building) is a commercial building in the Downtown Brooklyn neighborhood of New York City. Built from 1896 to 1898 as the headquarters for the New York and New Jersey Telephone and Telegraph Company (later the New York Telephone Company), it is located at the northeast corner of Willoughby and Lawrence Streets. The building is eight stories tall and was designed by Rudolphe L. Daus in a mixture of the Beaux-Arts and Renaissance Revival styles.

The facade is largely clad with limestone on its bottom four stories, as well as brick and terracotta on its top four stories. The Willoughby and Lawrence Street elevations are each divided vertically into three bays and are highly similar in design. The main entrance is through an ornamental arch on Willoughby Street, at the southeast corner of the building. The remainder of the building contains ornamental details such as a curved corner with an oculus window, as well as a deep cornice on the upper stories. The building measures eight stories high with a basement and was largely constructed with a steel frame. When the building was constructed, the entire structure contained various departments, with a telephone exchange on the top floor.

The New York and New Jersey Telephone Company constructed 81 Willoughby Street in 1896 in response to increased business. Plans for the new structure were filed in May 1896, and the building was occupied by early 1898. The company's business grew so rapidly that it moved some operations to another building in 1904 and constructed a six-story annex at 360 Bridge Street between 1922 and 1923. New York Telephone acquired 81 Willoughby Street in 1929 and retained central office equipment there after a new telephone building opened in 1931 at 101 Willoughby Street. In 1943, the company sold off the building, which has remained a commercial structure ever since, accommodating offices, laboratories, and educational institutions. The New York City Landmarks Preservation Commission designated the building as a city landmark in 2004.

== Site ==
81 Willoughby Street is in the Downtown Brooklyn neighborhood of New York City. It occupies a rectangular land lot on the northeastern corner of Lawrence and Willoughby Streets, with an alternate address of 119–127 Lawrence Street. The site has frontage of 100 feet (30 m) on Lawrence Street to the west and 107.5 ft (32.8 m) on Willoughby Street to the south, with an area of 10,749 ft^{2} (998.6 m^{2}). Nearby buildings include the Brooklyner and Brooklyn Commons (formerly MetroTech) to the north; the BellTel Lofts (101 Willoughby Street) and Duffield Street Houses to the east; 388 Bridge Street and AVA DoBro to the southeast; and 370 Jay Street and the Old Brooklyn Fire Headquarters to the west. In addition, entrances to the New York City Subway's Jay Street–MetroTech station, served by the A, C, F, <F>, and R trains, are just outside the building.

The site was formerly occupied by a stable on Lawrence Street and four houses on Willoughby Street. Before the New York and New Jersey Telephone Company Building was developed at 81 Willoughby Street, the adjacent section of Willoughby Street had largely contained houses. By the 1890s, many of these houses were replaced by commercial buildings.

== Architecture ==
Rudolphe L. Daus designed 81 Willoughby Street. The AIA Guide to New York City describes the structure as being in a mixture of the Beaux-Arts and Renaissance Revival styles, but a contemporary publication from 1897 characterized the building as being solely of Italian Renaissance design. The building is eight stories, with a curved corner to its southwest.

=== Facade ===
The facade is largely clad with tan brick and limestone and is ornamented with terracotta. Limestone was used on the lowest stories, while brick and terracotta were used above. The southern and western elevations of the facade, which respectively face Willoughby and Lawrence Street, are each divided vertically into three bays and are highly similar in design. At the easternmost section of the Willoughby Street elevation is an additional, narrow bay without ornament and clad almost entirely in brick. A curved corner connects the western and southern elevations. The building has stone cornices above the first, fourth, and sixth stories and a copper cornice above the eighth story. The windows all consist of one-over-one sash windows with aluminum frames. There are telephone-related motifs on the curved corner. The juxtaposition of plain facade materials was intended to emphasize the building's ornamentation, while the cornice and the oculus at the corner were intended to draw attention to the building from the intersection of Willoughby and Lawrence Streets.

==== Ground story ====
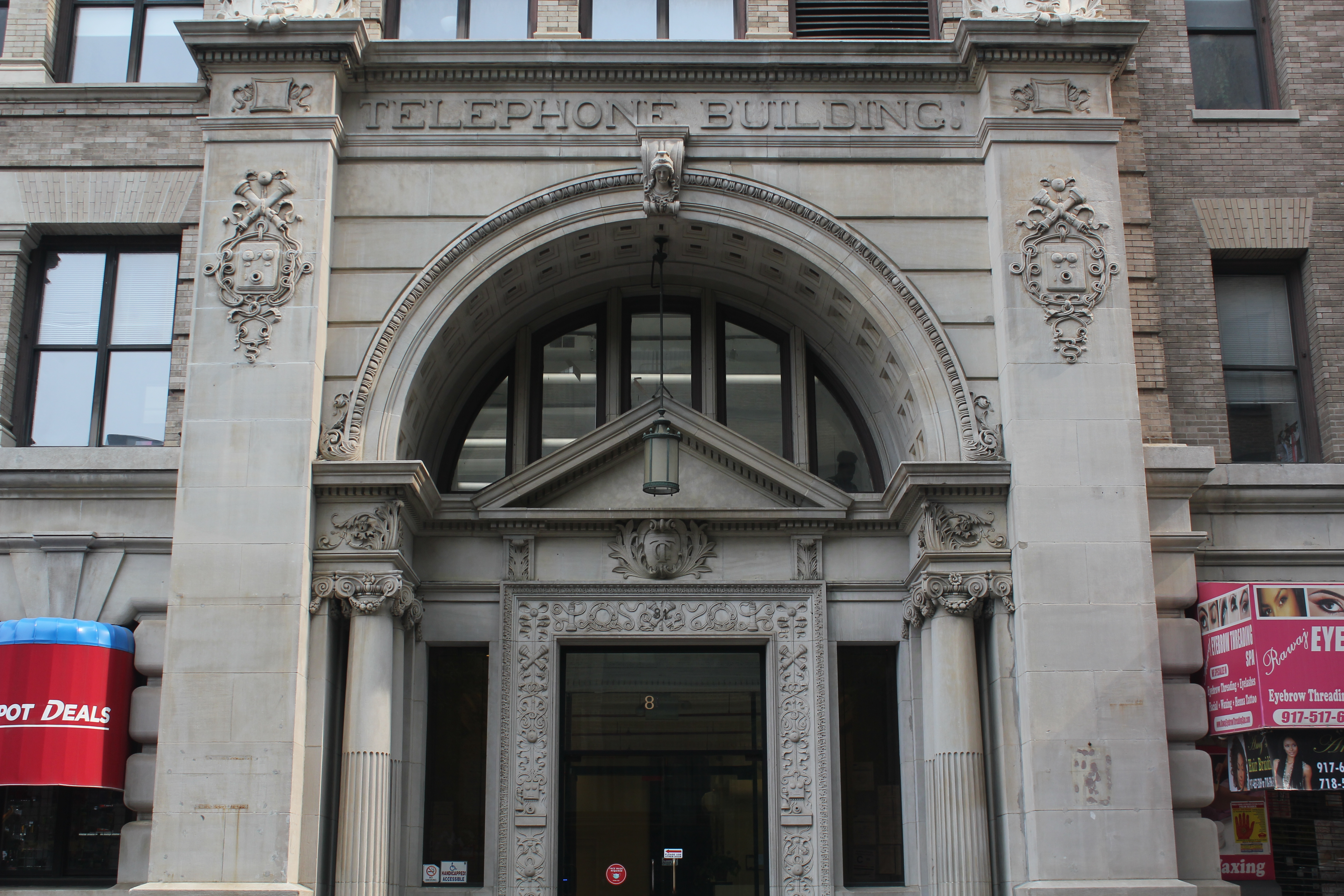
Main entrance

On Willoughby Street, the easternmost bay contains the building's main entrance, a double-height arch with an entablature above. Recessed beneath the center of the archway is a rectangular door frame with molded earpieces, receivers, wires, and other telephone-related motifs. Immediately above this door frame, an entablature runs horizontally across the archway; this is topped by a triangular pediment. The second story of the archway is filled with windows. The archway itself has a coffered ceiling, supported by two columns on either side of the doorway; these columns contain capitals in the Corinthian order. The top of the arch has a keystone. There is a double-height pier on either side of the archway, which has more moldings of telephone-related motifs. These piers support the entablature, which contains the words "Telephone Building". Above the piers, on the third story, are medallions with eagles.

A recessed service entrance is located within the easternmost, narrow bay to the right of the main entrance. The remainder of the facade is clad with rusticated, cement-coated limestone blocks. The center bay on Lawrence Street has another service entrance, placed within an arch that has largely been infilled with cement; this entrance is reached by metal steps. The corner of Lawrence and Willoughby Streets contains a stoop with metal balustrades, ascending to a glass door. All the other openings on the ground story consist of windows with awnings above them. A stone-and-brick cornice runs horizontally above the ground story.

==== Upper stories ====
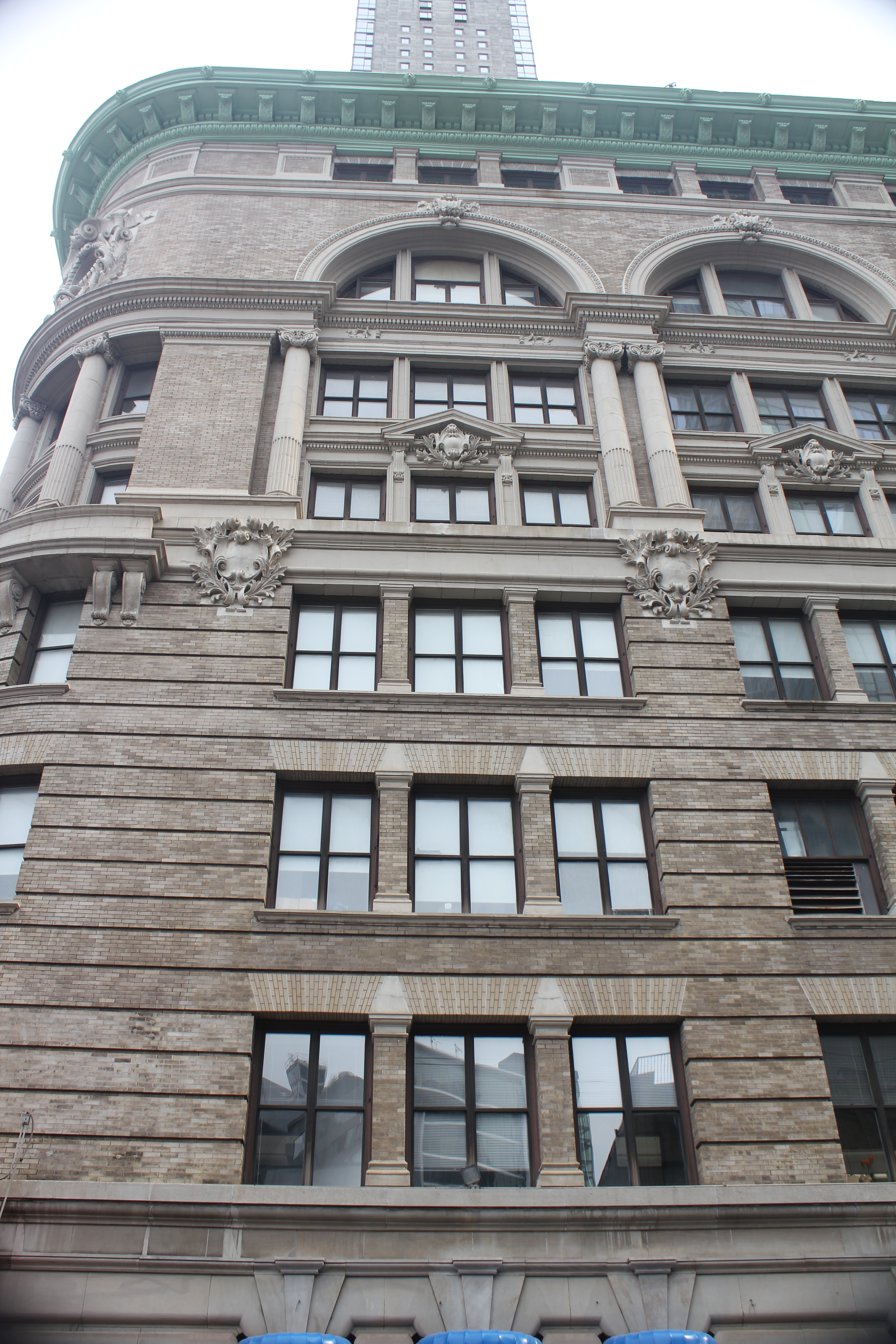
Westernmost bay on Willoughby Street

On the second to fourth stories, the facade is clad in brick and contains grooves at regular intervals, which give it a rusticated look. There are three windows per floor in each of the three main bays on Lawrence and Willoughby Streets, as well as on the curved corner. Each of the windows is rectangular, with a stone window sill below and a flat lintel above. The easternmost bay on Willoughby Street contains one window per floor. A protruding cornice runs above the facade on the fourth story, continuing onto the narrow Willoughby Street bay. There are medallions below the cornice between each of the bays on Lawrence and Willoughby Streets, as well as brackets below the cornice along the curved corner.

On the fifth and sixth stories, a pair of engaged columns flanks each of the three primary bays on Lawrence and Willoughby Streets. Within each bay, the central fifth-story window is flanked by colonettes that hold up triangular pediments. Another cornice runs above the sixth story; this cornice protrudes from the facade, except within each bay, where it is recessed between the windows above and below. At the seventh story, the curved corner has an oculus with terracotta decorations and cresting. The primary bays contain arched windows, which are divided vertically into three panes; a keystone tops the center pane, and the entire arch contains ornate moldings. On the eighth story, each of the primary bays has three windows, which are separated by short pilasters. A copper cornice runs above the eighth story, protruding from the facade. Above the cornice was a short penthouse (not visible from the street), which had restrooms and dining rooms.

=== Interior ===
The building measures eight stories high with a basement. The structure is largely constructed with a steel frame, although the foundations are composed of concrete walls measuring 4 to 5 ft (1.2 to 1.5 m) thick. These concrete walls support a grillage from which the beams in the superstructure ascend. The floor slabs are made of hollow brick flat arches and "Columbian fireproof" slabs. The building contained a ventilation shaft that rose 25 ft (7.6 m) above the roof. Air was drawn down the shaft to the basement, passing through several filters, and then was supplied to the offices inside the building via fans and ducts. A separate system of exhaust ducts ventilated the air onto the roof. A set of pipes also carried hundreds of telephone and telegraph cables from the cellar to the telephone switchboards on the top floor.

When the building was constructed, the basement and first four floors were dedicated to various New York and New Jersey Telephone Company departments. The first floor contained the supply department, the second floor contained the repair shop, and the fourth floor contained the general superintendent's office. The fifth floor contained the offices of the general manager and vice president, the sixth floor contained the treasurer's office, and the seventh floor contained the offices of the auditors' department. The eighth floor originally housed the New York and New Jersey Telephone Company's primary Brooklyn exchange and could accommodate 5,000 to 6,000 subscribers when the building opened. This story contained the offices of the "hello girls", the company's mostly female telephone operators.

== History ==
The Bell Telephone Company was established in 1877 and merged with the New England Telephone and Telegraph Company in 1879 to form the National Bell Telephone Company. One of the subsidiaries of the combined firm was the New York and New Jersey Telephone Company, which was created in 1883. Originally, the New York and New Jersey Telephone Company operated telephone exchanges in North Jersey, Staten Island, and Long Island, licensing them from National Bell. At its inception, the company had 2,339 subscribers, most of whom lived in Brooklyn. With the growing popularity of telephones, the number of subscribers grew to nearly 20,000 by 1897.

=== Development ===
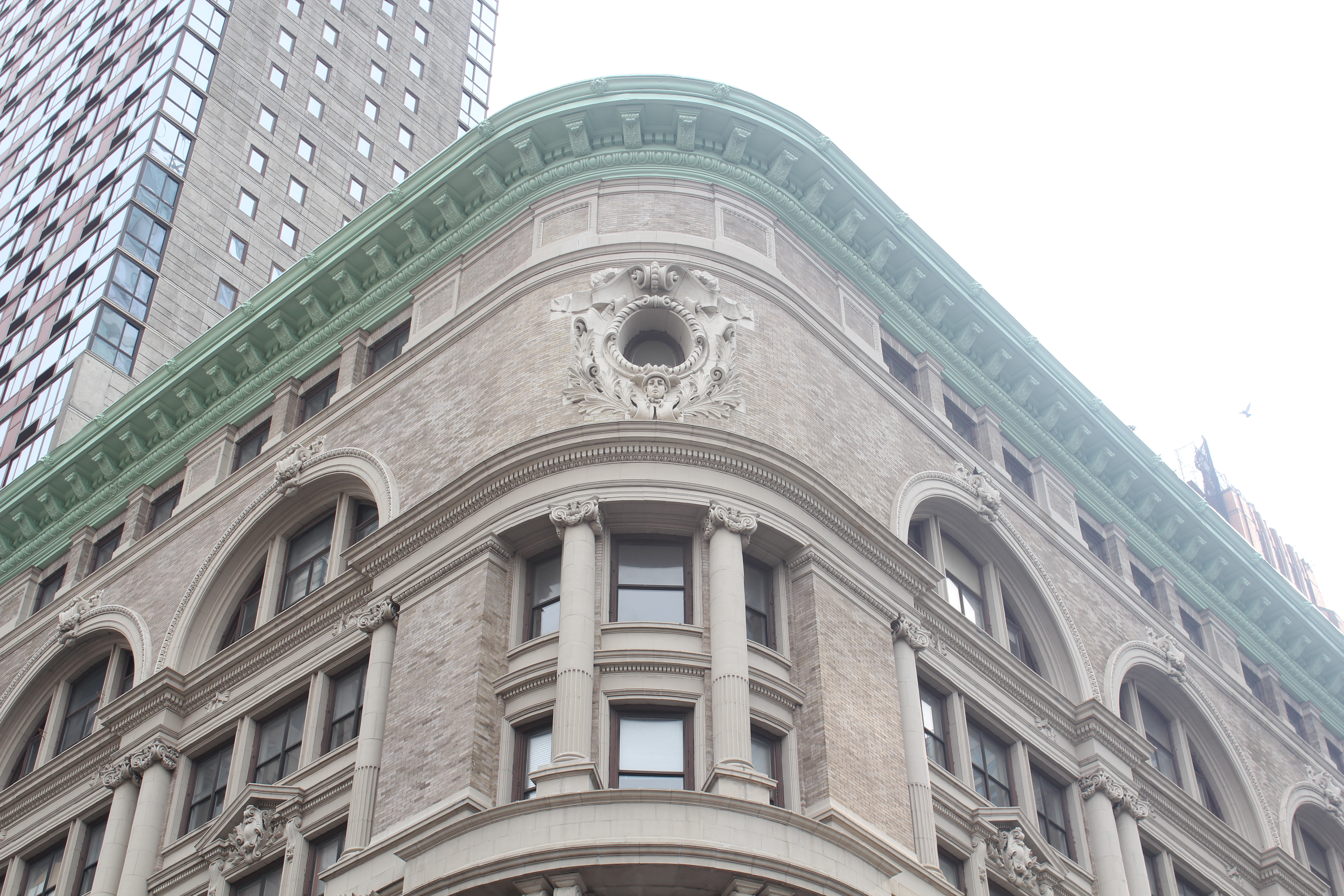
View of the curved corner's fifth through seventh stories

The New York and New Jersey Telephone Company decided in early 1896 to increase its capital stock. That April, the company decided to purchase a land lot on the southwest corner of Willoughby and Bridge Streets, just to the southeast of the site at 81 Willoughby Street. Local media reported shortly afterward that the company had agreed to acquire the northeast corner of Lawrence and Willoughby Streets, on which the company's central office would be constructed. Rudolphe Daus created preliminary sketches for a ten-story, stone-and-brick building in May 1896. At the time, the building was planned to cost between $250,000 and $275,000. Work on the structure was slightly delayed because of difficulties in acquiring a portion of the site.

Excavations were underway by March 1897, when the building had been downsized to eight and a half stories. When the contractors began installing plumbing in the building that August, they hired plumbers affiliated with a labor union in the then-separate city of New York, prompting workers affiliated with the Brooklyn union to go on strike. Union-affiliated roofers, tin workers, and sheet iron workers also went on strike in September to advocate wage increases for the workers who were installing the building's cornices and skylights. When these union workers went on strike again the next month, the workers' bosses decided to complete the cornices and skylights themselves. The building was completed by February 1898, and the company's main telephone exchange opened at the building in November 1899.

=== Use as telephone office ===
The New York and New Jersey Telephone Company's business grew so rapidly that, by 1903, the company had decided to move some of its operations to a new building at Atlantic Avenue and Clinton Avenue. The Atlantic Avenue building was completed in March 1904. All of the trunk lines from Nassau and Suffolk counties were moved from 81 Willoughby Street to the Atlantic Avenue building, as were the storerooms, repair shops, and supply rooms. The New York and New Jersey Telephone Company opened a training center for telephone operators on the top story in 1905 and installed equipment in the training center the next year. 81 Willoughby Street served as the general business office for subscribers in western and southern Brooklyn by 1908. New York and New Jersey Telephone and five other companies were merged in 1909, becoming the New York Telephone Company, which continued to operate from 81 Willoughby Street. The building also contained other tenants, such as a company selling security alarms.

The New York Telephone Company filed construction plans in November 1920 for an eight-story annex between Bridge and Lawrence Streets. The company began constructing a six-story annex at the northwest corner of Willoughby and Bridge Streets in April 1922. The annex, extending 107 ft (33 m) along Willoughby Street and 250 ft (76 m) along Bridge Street, was to cost $1.25 million. Although the annex was structurally separate from the original building, it would be connected to the original structure at every story, and the two lobbies were to be connected by a ground-story arcade. The annex was designed so it could be expanded to 12 stories if needed. A central office for emergency fire alarms was established within the building in 1921, allowing operators to transmit fire alarms during emergencies. The annex's construction required the demolition of nine existing structures, which had been razed by September 1922. The annex at 360 Bridge Street was completed in October 1923 at a cost of $1.5 million; it housed three central office departments that could not be accommodated in the old building.

During 1923, New York Telephone hired Western Electric to install one manually-operated and one machine-operated central office at 81 Willoughby Street. The company allocated money in 1927 for the creation of a dispatching bureau and a central testing bureau within the annex. The same year, New York Telephone relocated its Long Island headquarters to the building from Manhattan. New York Telephone, which had long rented 81 Willoughby Street, formally acquired the structure in 1929. The New York Telephone Company announced in late 1929 that it would relocate 3,500 employees from various buildings, including 81 Willoughby Street, into a new structure designed by Ralph Walker at 101 Willoughby Street. A central office for dial telephones was installed at 81 Willoughby Street and 360 Bridge Street in early 1931. After 101 Willoughby Street was completed in October 1931, the company continued to use the older structures to accommodate central office equipment.

=== Subsequent use ===
The New York Telephone Company sold the building, which at the time housed the Sperry Gyroscope Corporation, to an investor from Manhattan in August 1943. Poly Tech's Institute of Polymer Research moved to 81 Willoughby Street in late 1946, operating five laboratories there. The same year, the Sperry Gyroscope Company moved its training school to the building, occupying the second floor; the space could accommodate 80 daily students. By the early 1950s, Poly Tech's polymer institute occupied three of 81 Willoughby Street's eight floors, and the institute had 520 graduate-level students, including 120 full-time students. The New York state government also opened a rent-collection office within the building in 1956, replacing an earlier rent office on Fulton Street. Over the years, 101 Willoughby Street was sold several times and contained medical offices and a school. Meanwhile, New York Telephone Company and its successor NYNEX retained ownership of the annex at 360 Bridge Street.

Lebanese-American businessman Albert Srour bought 81 Willoughby Street in 1990 and cleaned the building's cornice and facade, as well as replaced the elevator. The Municipal Art Society's Preservation Committee, along with local civic group Brooklyn Heights Association, began petitioning the New York City Landmarks Preservation Commission (LPC) to designate over two dozen buildings in Downtown Brooklyn as landmarks in 2003. The LPC designated 81 Willoughby Street as a landmark in June 2004, along with New York Telephone's later building at 101 Willoughby Street later the same year. The buildings were designated shortly after the city government had approved a development plan for Downtown Brooklyn. The New York Times wrote that 81 Willoughby Street's landmark designation "is only the beginning of a potential wave" of landmarks in the neighborhood.

After the landmark designations, 81 Willoughby Street continued to be used as offices. The New York Times described the building as being occupied by nonprofit organizations, as well as doctors' and dentists' offices. By the late 2000s, ASA College occupied the ground floor and had mounted a canopy outside the building; the college was shuttered in 2023. Discount store Dollar Jackpot leased about 10,000 ft^{2} (930 m^{2}) on the building's ground floor in 2021. In addition, NY Beauty Suites opened a coworking space for beauty salon operators in early 2022. The coworking space contained 20 suites, each of which spanned between 100 and 200 ft^{2} (9.3 and 18.6 m^{2}).

== Critical reception ==
Christopher Gray of The New York Times referred to the building in 2008 as "a robust structure dominated by six great three-story arches", which nonetheless had "delicate and inventive" decoration. According to Gray, the two telephone buildings at 81 and 101 Willoughby Street were one block apart physically but "eons apart in their architecture", contrasting number 81's Beaux-Arts design with number 101's Art Deco design. Francis Morrone wrote in 2001 that 101 Willoughby Street "and the earlier telephone building at the northeast corner of Lawrence Street [at 81 Willoughby Street] make Willoughby one of the most exciting streets in downtown Brooklyn". The historian Barbaralee Diamonstein-Spielvogel wrote in 2011 that the building "served as a major statement of [New York and New Jersey Telephone]'s expansion in the area, providing offices and telephone switching in the heart of Brooklyn's expanding business district".

== See also ==
- List of New York City Designated Landmarks in Brooklyn
