= Disque Deane =

American financier and investor (1921–2010)

Disque D. Deane (July 6, 1921 – November 8, 2010) was a prominent American financier and investor. He was the founder of, and a general partner in Starrett City Associates, which owned Starrett City in Brooklyn (now called Spring Creek Towers). Deane was at one time a partner at Lazard, the investment bank, where he revolutionized corporate finance by pioneering sale-leaseback transactions.

== Biography ==
Disque was a 1939 graduate of Stuyvesant High School and attended Duke University. Deane was a founder of Corporate Property Investors which was sold to the Simon Property Group and which sold the General Motors Building to Donald Trump and Conseco Insurance for $878 million in 1998.

Other positions held by Disque Deane included Chairman of The Deane Group, private merchant bankers, and Bolfarm S.R.L, a large Bolivian industrial agricultural company. Deane held senior positions and directorships at Eastman Dillon Union Securities, RCA Corporation, and Sun Chemical. Deane was the Chairman of the Deane Laboratory at Duke University.

== Personal life ==
Deane married his first wife, Anne Shepard Delafield, in 1945. They had a son, Hare Delafield Deane, born in 1949. They divorced in 1950. He married his second wife, Marjorie Angele Schlesinger, Chairman and Publisher of the Tobe Report in 1952. They had four children: Marjorie Gregg Swain, Kathryn Morgan Deane-Krantz, Disque D. Deane, Jr., and Walter Longstreet Deane in addition to several grandchildren. They divorced in 1991. That same year, Deane married his third wife, Carol Woodin Gram. They had two children: Anne and Carl.

A resident of Boston, Deane died at the age of 89 on November 8, 2010, at his home there due to pneumonia. Services were held at the Fifth Avenue Presbyterian Church. In 2018, Starrett City Associates sold his property.
