= Clipper Equity =

Clipper Equity LLC
- Company type: Limited Liability Company
- Headquarters: New York (state)
- Area served: New York; New Jersey
- Key people: David Bistricer; Sam Levinson

Clipper Equity LLC is a partnership led by David Bistricer and Sam Levinson. The firm owns more than 60 buildings, with thousands of residential units, in New York and New Jersey. The partnership are known for their attempted purchase of the Starrett City housing complex in Brooklyn, New York, for $1.3 billion on February 8, 2007, in one of the largest real estate transactions in history. New York's Mayor Michael Bloomberg expressed concerns over the new landlord's history of building violations.

== Controversy ==
Clipper Equity attempted to buy the Starrett City complex, the largest federally subsidised housing development in the United States, for a then record $1.3 billion on February 8, 2007. The State of New York and the Federal Department of Housing and Urban Development expressed concerns, and on March 1, 2007, a US Federal Judge blocked the sale. According to the Associated Press, Housing Secretary Alphonso Jackson said Clipper Equity, the prospective buyer of the complex, failed to explain how it would remain an affordable community.

Due to past irregularities, Clipper Equity was banned for life in 1998 from converting apartments to condominiums or co-ops in New York State. Exceptions to this ban are made on an individual project basis. For example, Clipper Equity has been given permission to sell apartments it is renovating in Downtown Brooklyn.
