= David Bistricer =

American businessperson

- Born: August 10, 1949 (age 76); Brussels, Belgium
- Occupation: Real Estate Developer
- Known for: Founder and Principal of Clipper Equity
- Spouse: Esther Bistricer
- Children: Five
- Parent(s): Elsa Bistricer; Moric Bistricer

David Bistricer (born August 10, 1949) is a New York-based real estate developer and the founder and principal of Clipper Equity. His firm focuses on the conversion of non-residential buildings to residential uses.

== Early life and education ==
Bistricer was born in Brussels, Belgium to an Orthodox Jewish family, the son of Moric and Elsa Bistricer. His mother was a prisoner at the Bergen-Belsen concentration camp in Germany during World War II while his father hid from the Nazis in Budapest. In 1951, his family immigrated to New York City when Bistricer was two. In New York, his parents invested in real estate primarily on West End Avenue and Fifth Avenue in Manhattan. Bistricer joined the family business in the 1970s. In the 1980s, the Bistricer family was heavily involved in the conversion of rental buildings in New York City into cooperatives. In 1994, they were charged with not disclosing sufficient information to the buyers of the units and in 1998, they were banned from selling co-ops and condos. In 2001, the restriction on the family business was partially lifted and in 2009, it was fully lifted.

== Career ==
In 1987, in his first large transaction, Bistricer partnered with real estate investor Jacob Schwimmer and purchased a four-tower, 960 apartment complex at 101 Wadsworth Avenue in Washington Heights for $11 million. Also in 1987, Bistricer purchased 30% of the Chicago-based electrical wire manufacturer, Coleman Cable (which went public in 2007). In 2002, he expanded into Brooklyn purchasing two Downtown Brooklyn office buildings for $40 million; and in 2005, he purchased the 27-story New York Telephone Company building in Downtown Brooklyn and converted the building into the 219-unit BellTel Lofts condominiums, one of the first large residential projects in Downtown Brooklyn.

In 2005, Bistricer purchased the rent-regulated 59 building Vanderveer Estates Apartments in East Flatbush for $138.2 million with the intent to renovate them into a collection of spacious rental apartments, since renamed Flatbush Gardens. At the time of purchase, the complex had over 12,000 housing code violations inherited by Bistricer. By 2016, Bistricer spent diligent effort and $20 million in renovations to effectively reduce those violations by over 95%. Currently the complex is 97% occupied and considered a highly desirable place to reside.

In 2006, Bistricer founded Clipper Equity. A year later, his bid to purchase for $1.3 billion the rent regulated Starrett City complex in East New York failed, partly the result of bad publicity surrounding the Tishman Speyer Properties purchase of Stuyvesant Town–Peter Cooper Village. In 2011, partnering with Joseph Chetrit, he purchased the Chelsea Hotel for $80 million; they sold their interest in 2013. In 2013, Bistricer began the restoration and reconversion to a hotel of the former Hotel Bossert in Downtown Brooklyn and the conversion of the Cabrini Medical Center in Manhattan into housing.

In 2013, in his largest transaction to date, Bistricer and his partner Joseph Chetrit, purchased the Sony Tower in New York City for $1.1 billion, intending to convert the building into condominiums. They halted the project in 2016 due to fears of an over-supply of luxury housing, instead selling the building for $1.4B to the Olayan Group of Saudi Arabia.

Bistricer has a conservative investment methodology and typically minimizes the use of debt with no more than 70 percent debt to equity.

== Philanthropy ==
In 2012, Bistricer donated $70,000 to various nonprofit groups including Yeshiva Simchas Chaim in Sheepshead Bay.

== Personal life ==
Bistricer lives in Borough Park, Brooklyn with his wife Esther. They have five children. His son J.J. Bistricer is also active in the family business.
